= Siege of Buda (1849) =

Siege during Hungarian Revolution of 1848

Coordinates: 47°30′04.0″N 19°02′09.8″E

- Part of the Hungarian Revolution of 1848
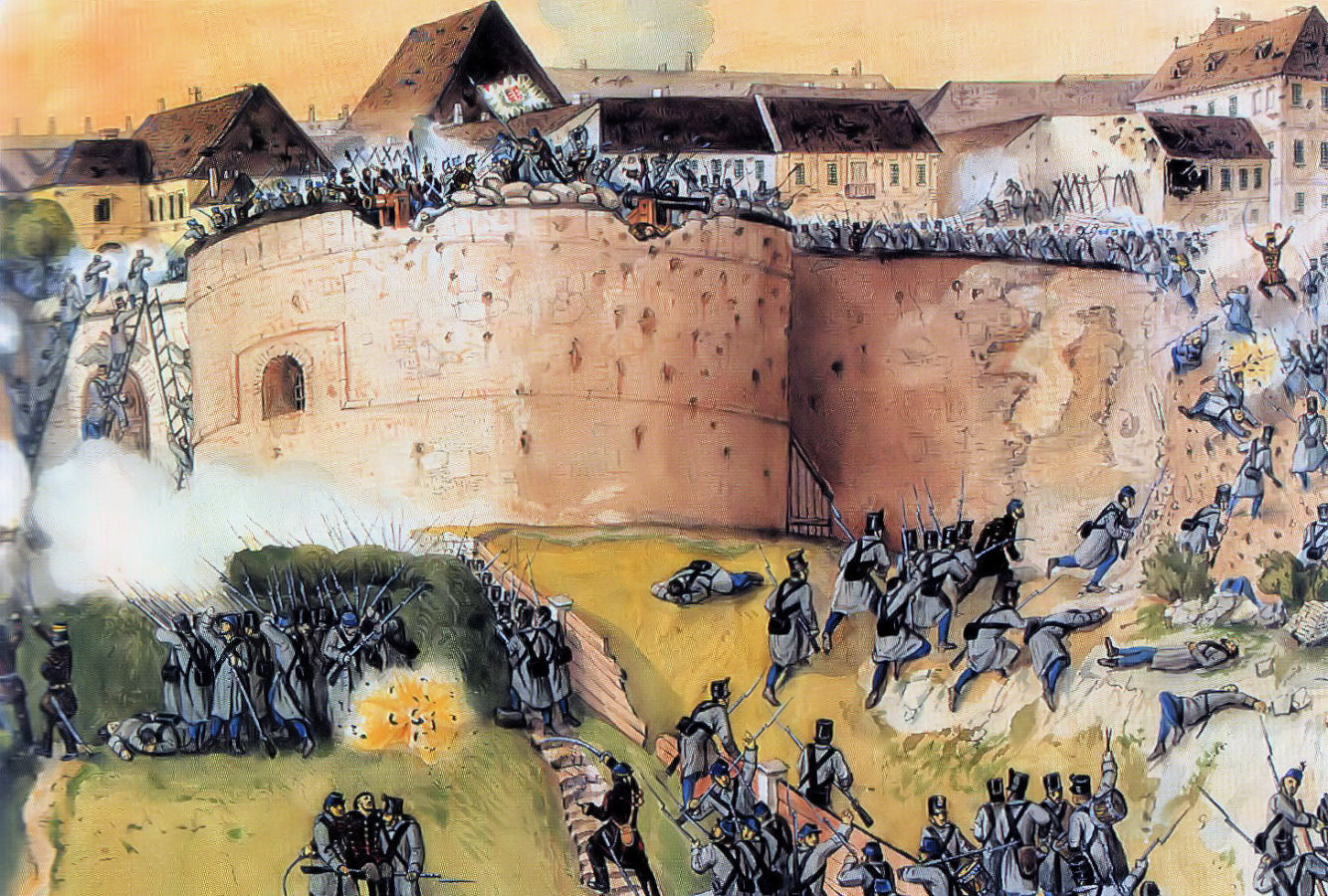
- Painting by Mór Than
Date	4 May 1849 – 21 May 1849
Location	Buda, Kingdom of Hungary
Result	Hungarian victory

Belligerents
Hungarian Revolutionary Army	Austrian Empire

Commanders and leaders
Artúr Görgei; József Nagysándor; Károly Knezić; Lajos Aulich; György Kmety	Heinrich Hentzi (DOW); Alois Alnoch †

Strength
Total: 34,277 men – I. corps: 9,465 – II. corps: 7,799 – III. corps: 9,419 – VII. corps –– 15. division: 4,883 –– 12. division: 2,711; 142 cannons	4,890 men 85 cannons

Casualties and losses
368–427 dead 700–691 wounded	710 dead 4,204 captured 248 cannons

The siege of Buda took place at Buda castle (called Festung Ofen in German), part of the twin capital cities of the Kingdom of Hungary. The Hungarian revolutionary army was led by General Artúr Görgei during the Hungarian War of Independence. Part of the Spring Campaign, the siege began on 4 May 1849, ending with the Hungarian capture of the castle by assault on 21 May.

Buda Castle was the only fortress throughout the entire war to be taken by storm by the besiegers on either side. All other fortresses capitulated following agreements between besiegers and besieged. The siege of Buda was also the shortest siege of the war (18 days). The senseless bombardment of Pest by Austrian commander Major General Heinrich Hentzi caused destruction of classic buildings on the shores of the Danube. Other regions of the capitals also suffered heavy damage due to the artillery duels between the two sides.

The capture of Buda Castle completed the liberation of the Hungarian capital cities (Buda and Pest). Thanks to this, the second Hungarian revolutionary Government, led by Bertalan Szemere together with Governor-President Lajos Kossuth, returned from Debrecen, the interim capital of the Hungarian revolution, to the capital of Hungary.

On 21 May 1849, the same day as the capture of Buda, the two emperors Franz Joseph I of Austria and Tsar Nicholas I of Russia signed the final treaty in Warsaw, which agreed on the intervention in Hungary of 200,000 Russian soldiers (and an 80,000-strong reserve force, if necessary), in order to help the Austrian Empire crush the Hungarian revolution.

== Towards Vienna or to Buda? ==
Following the relief of Komárom from the imperial siege and the retreat of the Habsburg forces to the Hungarian border, the Hungarian army had two choices as to where to continue its advance. One was to march on Pozsony and Vienna, in order to force the enemy to fight on their own ground; the other was to return eastwards to retake Buda Castle, which was held by a strong imperial garrison of 5,000 men under the command of Heinrich Hentzi.

The first choice was supported mainly by the chief of the general staff, Lieutenant-Colonel József Bayer, and initially by Görgei; the second option's main proponent was General György Klapka, commanding I Corps. The main reason for the first plan as supported initially by Görgei was the threat of Russian intervention. The Hungarian commander thought that his army had more chance of success if it could destroy the Austrian imperial army before the Tzar's troops arrived.

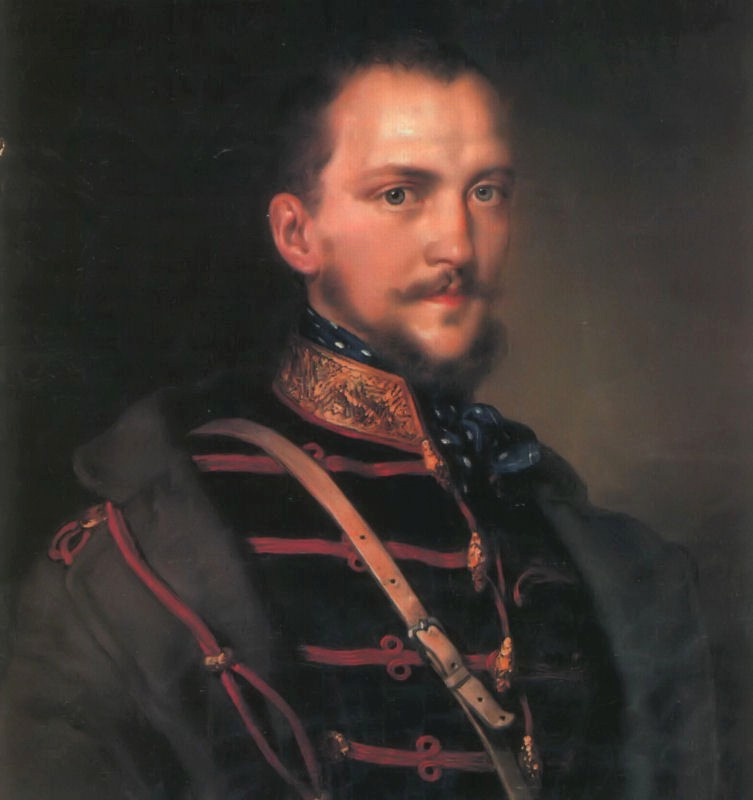
Artúr Görgei

However, Görgei was quickly convinced by those who wanted to liberate the castle of Buda first. So he changed his mind and supported the second choice. Although the first option seemed very attractive to him, its success was nearly impossible. While the Hungarian army gathered before Komárom had fewer than 27,000 men, the imperial army awaiting them around Pozsony and Vienna had 75,633, of which its effective combat strength was 54,443 with 237 guns, so it was twice the size of Görgei's force. Furthermore, the Hungarian army was short of ammunition.

Capturing Buda Castle seemed more achievable at that moment, Klapka arguing that it was not suited to withstand a siege, and could be taken quickly by a surprise attack, which could be achieved with the available Hungarian forces. Leaving a strong imperial garrison in the middle of the country would represent a major threat if the main Hungarian army wanted to move towards Vienna. Because attacks from the castle could cut the Hungarian lines of communication, it would need to be blockaded by a significant force in order to prevent such sorties. The fact that the only permanent bridge on the Hungarian part of the Danube (temporary pontoon bridges existed in many places), the Chain Bridge, was under the control of the imperial garrison in Buda Castle made it impossible to transport supplies to the Hungarian armies fighting in the West. Thus, the castle's real strategical importance underlined the need to take it as soon as possible.

Furthermore, the presence of Josip Jelačić's corps in southern Hungary led the Hungarian commanders to believe that the Croatian ban could advance towards Buda at any moment to relieve it, cutting Hungary in two. The Hungarian staff understood that without taking the castle, the main army could not campaign towards Vienna without putting the country in grave danger and that at that moment it was impossible to achieve victory against the numerically and technologically superior imperials gathered on the Western border of Hungary. This indicates that the arguments of those historians who wrote that Görgei made a mistake by not continuing the attack towards Vienna, because he had a great chance to take the Austrian capital and win the war before the Russian intervention, are wrong, and at that moment (before the arrival of the Hungarian reinforcements from the south) the only place which could gain a victory was the Castle of Buda.

Beside the military arguments in favour of the siege of Buda, there were political ones too. After the declaration of the independence of Hungary, the Hungarian parliament wanted to persuade foreign states to acknowledge Hungary's independence and knew that there was more chance of achieving this after the total liberation of their capital city Buda-Pest. And the capital city also included the Buda castle. So the council of war held on 29 April 1849 decided to besiege and take Buda Castle, and then, after the arrival of reinforcements from southern Hungary, move to attack Vienna in order to force the empire to sue for peace and recognize the independence of Hungary.

== The castle before the siege ==
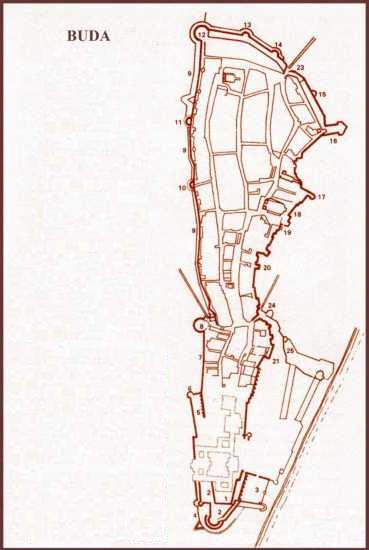
Plan of Buda Castle

The Turkish occupation of Buda had ended on 2 September 1686, after a bloody siege by the Austrians. After that, the castle was the property of the Hungarian king (who was at the same time Holy Roman Emperor until 1804, and after that Austrian Emperor), and was defended by foreign (not Hungarian) soldiers led by a foreign officer. After the Hungarian revolution succeeded and the Batthyány Government was formed, the castle was still defended by foreign soldiers who had to recognize the Hungarian Government's authority. Because he did not want to do so, the commander of the garrison, Lieutenant General Karl Kress resigned and left on 11 May 1848. So, too, did those foreign units stationed in the castle who were against the Hungarian revolution, such as the Italian 23rd infantry regiment, who clashed with the newly conscripted Hungarian soldiers on 11 June 1848, resulting in many deaths. After this conflict, on the orders of the Hungarian War Ministry, the Italian 23rd infantry regiment was withdrawn from Hungary.

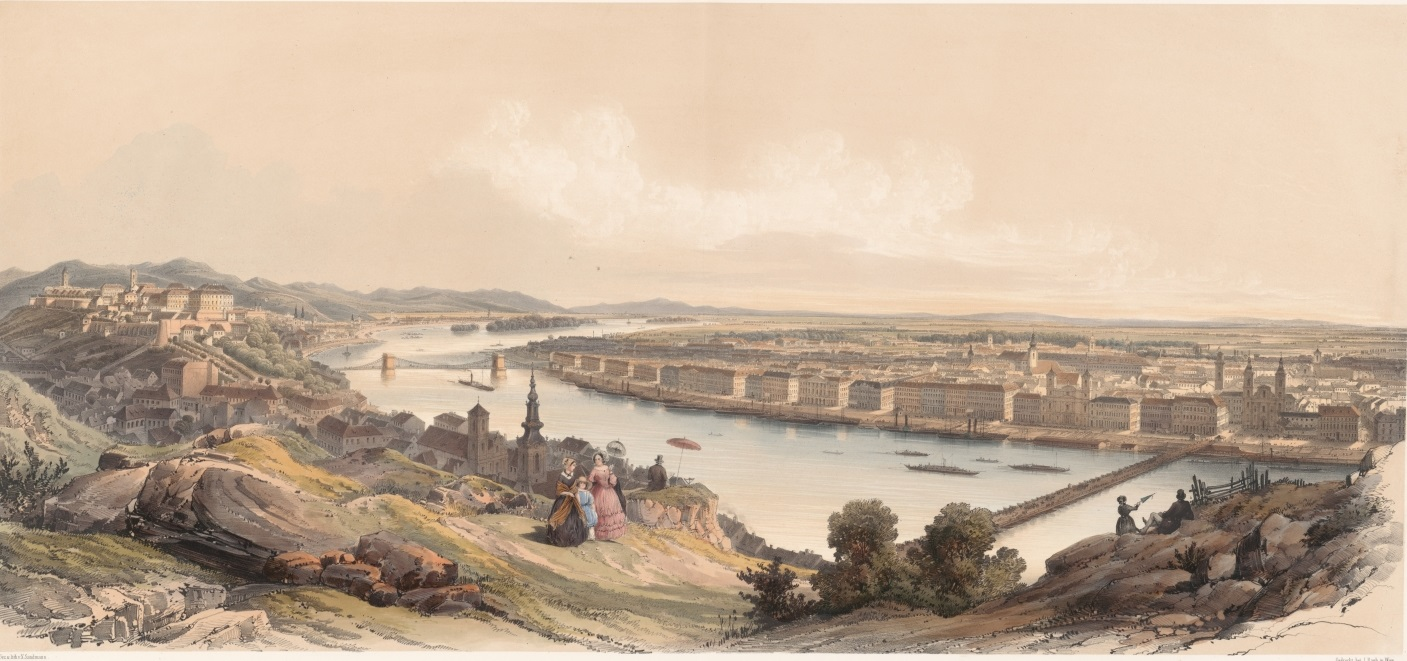
Franz Joseph Sandman Buda and Pest in the 1840s, as seen from Gellért Hill

Following the imperial campaign against Hungary that began in mid-December 1848 and was led by Field Marshal Alfred I, Prince of Windisch-Grätz, the ensuing retreat of the Hungarian armies, and the Hungarian defeat at the Battle of Mór, the Habsburg troops entered the Hungarian capitals on 5 January 1849. The free Hungarian parliament, the National Defense Committee (interim government of Hungary), and a long convoy of civilians with all their possessions fled through the cold and snowy winter east to the Tisza River, installing the interim capital at Debrecen. The first thing Windisch-Grätz ordered after entering Buda was the occupation of the castle and the Gellért Hill. Windisch-Grätz named Lieutenant General Ladislas Wrbna as the commander of the Buda Military District, the military commander of the imperial troops in the capitals. But at the end of February, when the commander-in-chief prepared to attack the Hungarian army, he took Wrbna with him on the campaign, leaving Major General Heinrich Hentzi, commander of the imperial garrison of the Castle of Buda, to take overall command of the troops in Buda and Pest.

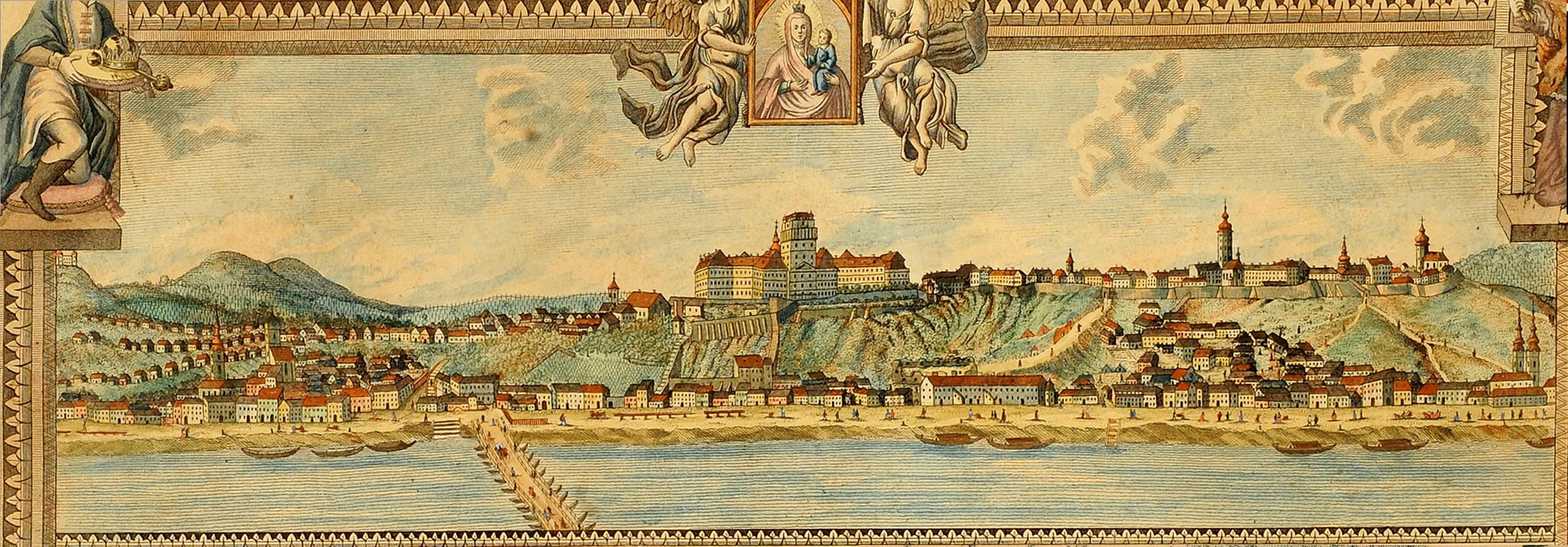
Castle of Buda on a guild letter, 1816

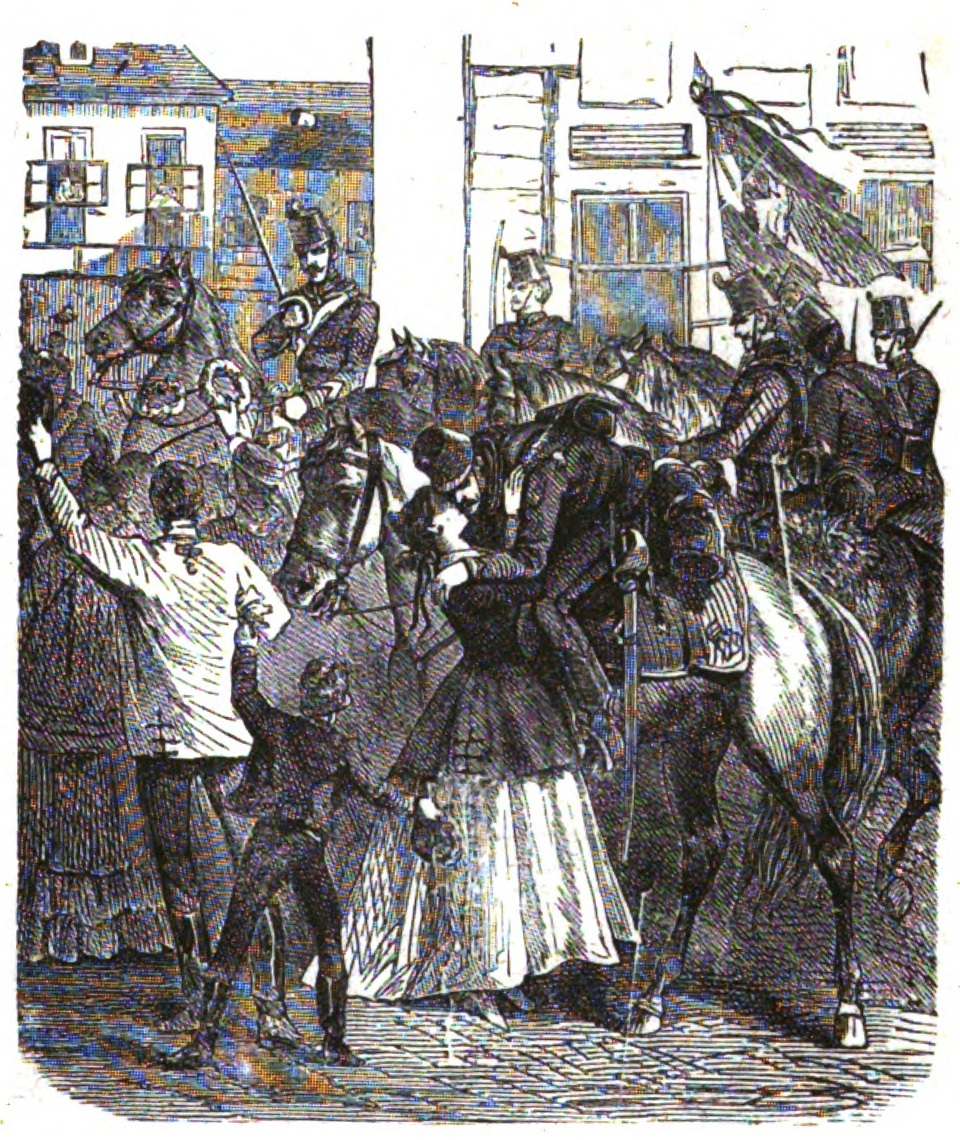
The people of Pest welcoming the first Hungarian Hussars, who entered Pest on 24 April 1849

During April 1849, the main imperial force led by Field Marshal Windisch-Grätz suffered one defeat after another and retreated towards the western border of Hungary. The Hungarian victory at Nagysalló on 19 April had decisive results for the imperial occupation forces stationed in Hungary. It opened the way towards Komárom, bringing its relief to within just a couple of days' march. At the same time it put the imperials in the situation of being incapable of stretching their troops across the very large front which this Hungarian victory created; so, instead of concentrating their troops around Pest and Buda as they had planned, Feldzeugmeister Ludwig von Welden, Windisch-Grätz's replacement as the imperial commander-in-chief in Hungary, had to order the retreat from Pest to avoid being caught between the Hungarian pincers.

When he learned of the defeat at Nagysalló on the morning of 20 April, he wrote to Lieutenant General Balthasar Simunich, the commander of the force besieging Komárom, and to Prince Felix of Schwarzenberg, the Minister-President of the Austrian Empire, that in order to secure Vienna and Pozsony from Hungarian attack he was forced to retreat from Pest and even from Komárom. He also wrote that the morale of the imperial troops was very low, and because of this they could not fight another battle for a while without suffering another defeat. So, the next day he ordered the evacuation of Pest, leaving an important garrison in the fortress of Buda to defend it against Hungarian attack. He ordered Jelačić to remain in Pest for a while, and then to retreat towards Eszék, in Bácska, where the Serbian insurgents allied with the Austrians were in a grave situation after the victories of the Hungarian armies led by Mór Perczel and Józef Bem.

On 24 April, the last imperial soldiers left Pest. That same morning at 7 o'clock seven, hussars from the Hungarian II Corps entered the city, welcomed by the cheers of happy crowds of citizens who had been waiting so long to be liberated. In Buda the next day, Hentzi convened two meetings with his officers and declared that he would defend the Castle of Buda until his last breath.

== Preparations for the defence of Buda ==
The Castle of Buda—or, as it is also known, the Upper Town of Buda (budai felsőváros)—lies on a hill 167 metres (548 ft) above sea level and 70 metres (230 ft) above the Danube which flows beneath it. This so-called Castle Hill (Várhegy) has the oblong irregular shape with its tip to the southeast and its base to the northwest, with a length of 660 metres (2,170 ft). On its wider, northeast side with the Royal Palace is 156 metres (512 ft) high, while its southwest side is 163 metres (535 ft) high. The hill is surrounded by suburbs, with the Danube to the east 260-meter-wide (850 ft), Gellért Hill to the south 235-meter-high (771 ft), Naphegy 158-meter-high (518 ft) and Little Gellért Hill (Kis-Gellérthegy) 168-meter-high (551 ft) to the southwest, Kissváb Hill (Kissvábhegy) 249-meter-high (817 ft) to the west, and Rókus Hill (Rókushegy or Rézmál) 249-meter-high (817 ft) to the northwest; also to the northwest are Ferenc Hill (Ferenchegy or Vérhalom) 265-meter-high (869 ft) and Kálvária Hill (Kálvária-hegy) 161-meter-high (528 ft), and József Hill (Józsefhegy or Szemlőhegy) 232-meter-high (761 ft) and Rózsa Hill (Rózsadomb) 195-meter-high (640 ft) to the north. Across the Danube to the east there are no heights near the castle.

The heights of the walls surrounding the castle were not uniform. They were punctuated by old circular bastions, called rondellas, and newer, polygonal bastions, close enough together to enable them to bring fire to bear on the enemy attacking the walls between them. The fact that there were no moats, beneath the walls, and that the hill was surrounded by houses and gardens except near the four castle gates, made the besiegers' job easier. The castle's defenses were of 16th century standard, because fortification modernization of later periods had almost no effect on this castle without exterior walls and defenses and consisting only of a "core fort". The most important defenses of the castle were its walls surrounding the edges of the Castle Hill. This wall was built in different periods and was repaired in various ways in the 163 years between the sieges of 1686 and 1849. Because of this, it was of different widths, without embrasures, protective structures, etc., and lacking the most basic elements of modern siege technology. The gates were mostly vestiges of the past rather than real castle gates, lacking trenches or drawbridges. Comparing it with Hungarian castles such as Arad, Temesvár, Komárom, Gyulafehérvár, Pétervárad or Eszék, it can be said that it was centuries behind these; and because of this the intention to defend it came as a surprise to many. But the imperials understood the importance of holding the Castle of Buda as long as they could, both for political and symbolic reasons as well because of having accumulated a large store of military equipment there; and they did not want to give all of these up so easily.

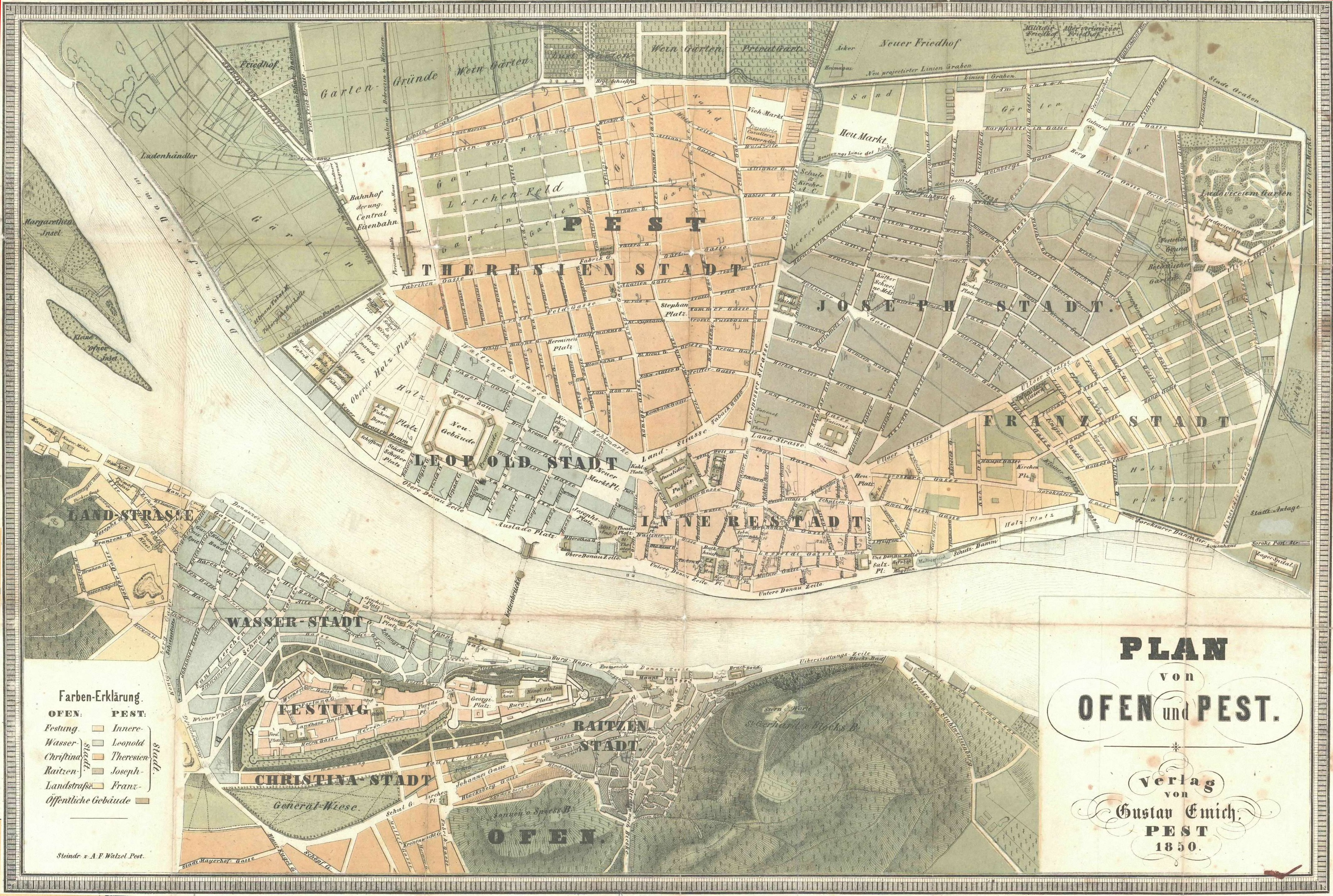
The Hungarian capitals Pest and Buda in 1850 (in German language). Districts of Buda (in German Ofen): – Festung (The Buda Castle), – Wasser-Stadt = Vízváros (Watertown), – Christina-Stadt = Krisztinaváros (Christinatown), – Land-Strasse = Országút (Main Road), – Raitzen-Stadt = Rácváros (Serbian Town). Hills: – St. Gerhards Block = Gellérthegy (Gellért Hill), – Sonnen Spiess = Naphegy (Sun Hill). The Gates of the Buda Castle: – Wasser Tor = Vízikapu (Water Gate), – Burg Tor = Várkapu (Castle Gate), – Weissbrg Tor = Fehérvári kapu (Székesfehérvár Gate), – Wiener Tor = Bécsi kapu (Vienna Gate), Other important locations during the siege: – Kettenbrücke = Lánchíd (Chain Bridge), – Köngl. Schloss = Budavári palota (Kings castle), – Georgi Platz = Szent György tér (St. George Square), – Fischer B. = Halászbástya (Fishermans Bastion), – Zeughaus = Fegyvertár (Arsenal), – Margarethen Insel = Margitsziget (Margaret Island)

The strengthening of the castle of Buda in post-revolution Hungary started after Lieutenant Field Marshal Josip Jelačić 's Croatian army entered Hungary to overthrow Lajos Batthyány's national Hungarian government and was advancing on the Hungarian capitals. The first plans for this were drawn up after Jelačić had been defeated at Pákozd on 29 September 1848 and had retreated from Hungary. Although the enemy had retreated, the fear he had caused made the Hungarians think about strengthening Buda and Pest. They carved out arms stores in the rock of the Gellért Hill. At the beginning of October 1848, artillery lieutenant József Mack published a detailed plan to defend the capitals in the newspaper Kossuth Hírlapja (Kossuth's Gazette). Mack wrote that the castle could be defended, saying that with the 50 cannon in the castle any enemy could easily be kept at a distance. He claimed that enemy artillery could only threaten the castle from Gellért Hill, and that with just six 24-pounder cannon he could prevent anyone from installing their batteries there. He also said that the cannon could prevent enemy rocket batteries from burning down the city. As for the forces necessary to hold the castle, Mack stated that 2,500 soldiers and 300 artillerymen would be enough. Mack also wrote that the cannon could prevent the enemy rocket batteries from burning down the city. For the forces necessary to hold the castle, Mack wrote that 2500 soldiers and 300 artillerymen would be enough. In the Autumn of 1848 the Hungarian patriotic militiamen formed an artillery corps, and received a battery of 6-pounder guns. In December, 9 cannon and 2 howitzers arrived, which, according to an inscription on one of them, were made in 1559. Some of these cannon would actually be used in the defense of the castle in May 1849.

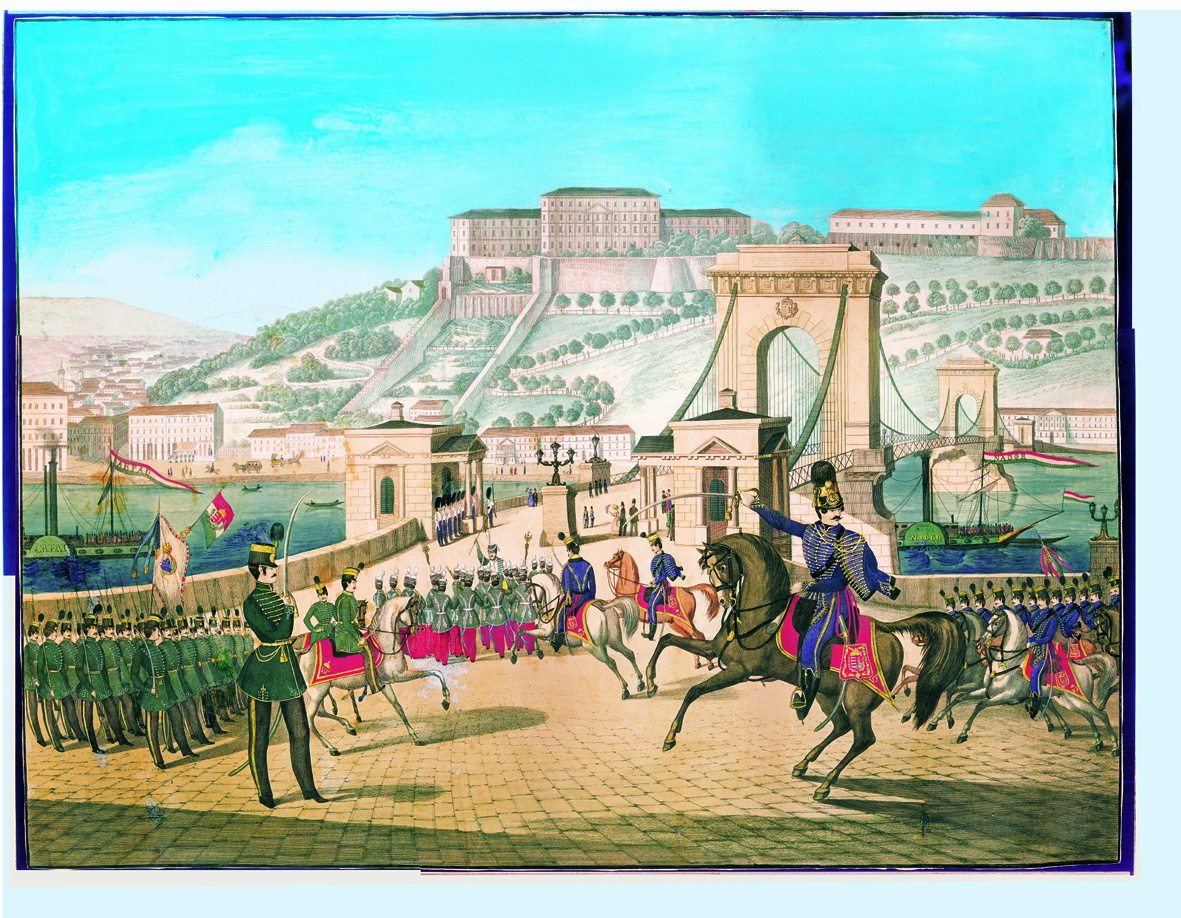
The Chain Bridge in Buda, 1847, with the castle in the background, by Sámuel Lehnhardt

When the victorious Hungarian Spring Campaign began, especially after their defeat in the Battle of Isaszeg, the imperial commanders started to be more and more concerned about the defence of the capitals and of Buda Castle. Hentzi prepared a plan for the defence of the capitals, and after this was criticised because it did not include Buda Castle, he quickly made another one. But this plan was also criticized, by Colonel Trattnern, the director of imperial military engineering, criticisms which were later proved to be justified. Hentzi thought that the cannon in the 1st to 4th rondellas (the circular bastions) needed almost no protective entrenchments; that the gates were well protected by the artillery, which could easily prevent the positioning enemy artillery before them; that the curtain wall of the castle was so strong that 12-pounder cannon could not damage it, so it was unnecessary to make earth revetments around it; that an enemy attack on the Chain Bridge could easily be stopped with gunfire; that there was no need for shell-proof shelters, because the Hungarians had no mortars; and that Svábhegy was too far from the castle to be dangerous, as opposed to the side of the Royal Palace, which is close to the Little Gellért Hill.

In mid-April, there were some indications that the imperials would retreat from Pest: such as the return of cotton sandbags to the inhabitants, the sandbags having been previously commandeered in order to build defences around the town. On the other hand, Welden wrote a letter to Hentzi in which he ordered him to defend the Danube line, or at least Buda castle, for as long as "the condition of the defensive features of the castle [walls, bastions] and of your food supply makes it possible". The commander-in-chief noted that Hentzi should respond to attacks and gunfire coming from the direction of Pest with bullets and grapeshot only, so as to spare the splendid buildings of the city, giving him permission to use roundshot and shell only if the population of Pest behaved in an unacceptable manner towards the imperials. But Hentzi did not respect this order, and bombarded Pest, destroying the Classical styled buildings on the shores of the Danube, and others in Pest, despite the fact that the inhabitants did nothing to provoke him, and despite a personal request from Görgei in this regard. Welden's letter informs Hentzi that the food supply of the castle was enough for 6 weeks and there was enough ammunition for the defense. It also states that any cannon to be found in Buda and Pest must be brought into the castle, the waterworks which enabled the defenders to be supplied with water from the Danube must be strengthened with firing platforms for cannon, and the palisades on the left bank of the Danube must be removed because they could be advantageous for the enemy.

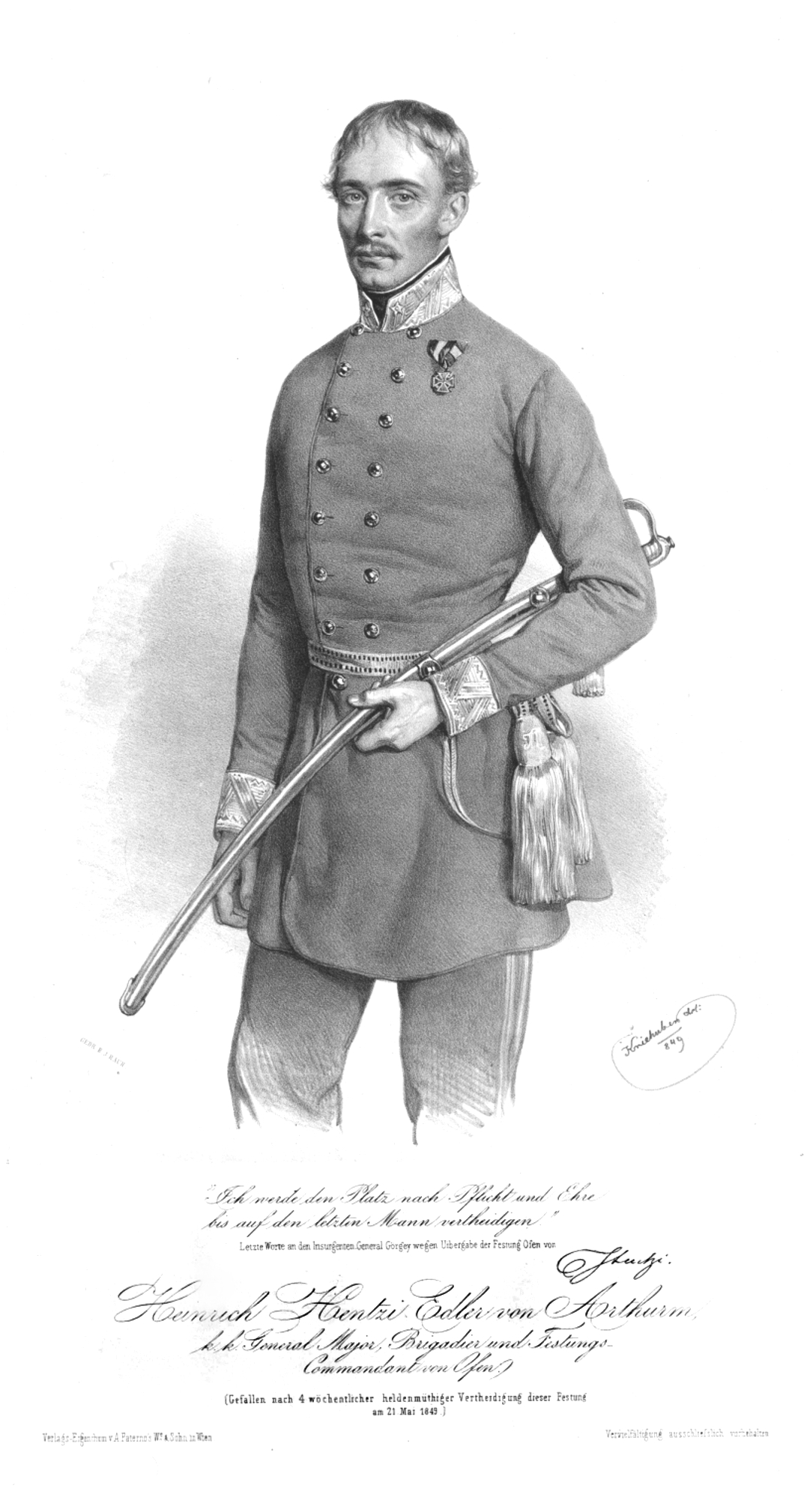
Heinrich Hentzi, commander of the castle's defending army

Hentzi was an experienced officer with a deep knowledge of engineering, so he was qualified to lead the technical and logistical preparations for the defence of the castle. He actually started these preparations in January 1849, after he was appointed to lead the repair of its fortifications, having presented himself to Field Marshal Windisch-Grätz when the latter occupied the capitals. In the winter of 1849, Hentzi carried out the construction of the works protecting the ends of the Chain Bridge and the palisade from the left end of the Chain Bridge and the Újépület (New Building). After finishing those, the work stopped because the money ran out.

On 24 April, when Jelačić's corps left the capitals for southern Hungary, Hentzi burned the pontoon bridge across the Danube. He then ordered the people who lived in the castle to store enough food and water for two months; those who could not do so had to leave. Over the next few days, until 3 May, Hentzi gathered beef cattle and other food for his soldiers, manufactured enough ammunition for the infantry and artillery, and strengthened the fortifications of the castle. Under his command the engineering captains Pollini and Gorini supervised the work of 200 soldiers and that of many laborers from the capitals and from the Swabian villages around them, to strengthen the weak points of the fortifications, paying them a salary. The workers also made parapets and overhead cover for the cannon.

Hentzi decreed that the waterworks of Buda, which supplied the castle with water from the Danube, should be fortified with palisades facing north and south, to be defended by his soldiers, and a defensive work in what is now Clark Ádám Place, in which they could take cover. He named a chevau-léger (light cavalry) captain to be the leader of the firemen; and in order so far as possible to prevent fire breaking out during the siege, he ordered residents of the castle to remove all flammable material from their attics. He designated a detachment of pioneers to be ready to remove any grenades or bombs that might land on houses, to prevent the damage they might cause.

The northern fortification of the waterworks was around the pumping station, allowing for observation of the Chain Bridge, to prevent an attack from there. Hentzi ordered that the planks which enabled crossing the unfinished bridges should be removed. He also ordered that 4 so-called Rambart boxes, filled with 400 kilograms (880 lb) of gunpowder, should be put on the iron beams which led to the piers of the bridge. These 4 boxes were linked by wooden tubes in which was put tinder. In order to make the explosion of the chests more destructive, big stones were put in them. The southern fortification of the waterworks ensured the defense of the aqueduct which supplied the Royal Palace with water.

=== Defensive order of battle ===
The Austrian defence force
Major General Heinrich Hentzi von Arthurm

Infantry

- 1. battalion of the 23. (Ceccopieri) infantry regiment, 3. battalion of the ban's 1. border guard regiment, 3. battalion of the Varasd-Kőrös 10. border guard regiment, 3. battalion of the 12. (Wilhelm) infantry regiment;

Cavalry

- 1. company of the 1. (Archduke Johann) dragoon regiment;

Artillery

- 1 six-pounder infantry battery from the 3. artillery regiment, 1 platoon of the 28. (Hohenlohe) infantry regiment, 1/2 eighteen-pounder battery, 2. company of the 5. artillery regiment, garrison artillery;

Sappers

- Wagoners and artillery carriage drivers, 2. field hospital.

Total: 4764 soldiers, 293 horses, 85 cannons.

Hentzi positioned his troops in and outside the castle, around the Waterworks, and at the end of the Chain Bridge in the following way:

– 3rd Battalion, 5th Border Guard Infantry Regiment: the defence line linking the barricade covering Víziváros (Water City), the Waterworks Fortress, and the promenade known as Ellipszis.
– 3rd Battalion, 12th (Archduke Wilhelm) Infantry Regiment: the defensive work at the Buda end of the Chain Bridge, the barricade at the Vízikapu (Watergate), the houses numbered 80–85 used in the defence of the Waterworks Fortress, the Royal Palace, the stairs leading to the Castle from the lower barricade, and the lower part of the Palace Garden.
– 3rd Battalion, 10th (Ban's) Infantry Regiment: Vienna Gate; Bastions I, II., V. and VII; circular bastion I. with a grenade thrower sentry post; and the sentry post below the Royal Palace, on the curtain wall, looking towards Krisztinaváros.
– 1st Battalion, 23rd (Ceccopieri) Infantry Regiment: the Palace Gate, before the barricade at the gate at Vízikapu, by the grenade-throwing sentry post between circular bastions I. and II., and also small detachments at the Nádor-barrack, at the so-called Country House (országház), at the military depot, at the town hall, and at the meat factory.
– 1st (Lieutenant-Colonel's) Squadron, 1st (Archduke John) dragoon regiment: one troop stationed in a shed down to the left of the Palace gate, the other in the Gróf Sándor house.

The two battalions from the Waterworks Fortress, together with one of the troops of dragoons, were used as pickets outside Buda, towards Óbuda and the vineyards of the Buda hills.

Before the siege, Hentzi had 85 guns altogether: the 57 he received from Welden, and another 28 which he had retrieved and repaired. He placed these strategically as follow:

– Rondella I: two 6-pounder, two 12-pounder, and one 19-pounder cannon; one 10-pounder howitzer,
– Rondella II: three 12-pounder cannon,
– Rondella III: one 3-pounder, two 12-pounder cannon,
– Rondella IV: one 3-pounder, three 12-pounder cannon,
– Bastion V:one 10-pounder howitzer,
– Rondella VI: one 6-pounder, one 12-pounder, and one 18-pounder cannon,
– Vienna Gate: one 6-pounder cannon,
– Bastion VII: one 18-pounder and two 24-pounder cannon; three 10-pounder mortars,
– Bastion VIII: two 12-pounder, one 18-pounder cannon; two 10-pounder howitzers,
– Bastion IX, or Fisherman's Bastion (Halászbástya): four 60-pounder mortars,
– Watergate: one 3-pounder cannon
– Bastion X: two 12-pounder cannon; three 60-pounder mortars,
– front facade of the Military Depot (Hadiszertár): three 30-pounder, three 60-pounder mortars,
– Bastion XI: two 12-pounder cannon,
– Upper terrace: two 24-pounder cannon; two 10-pounder howitzers; two 10-pounder mortars, four 60-pounder mortars,
– Middle terrace: one 10-pounder howitzer,
– Lower terrace: three 12-pounder, two 18-pounder cannon,
– Main guardroom: two 3-pounder cannon,
– Northern Waterworks Fortress: three 6-pounder cannon; one 7-pounder howitzer,
– Southern Waterworks Fortress: four 6-pounder cannon; one 7-pounder howitzer,
– Ellipsz: twelve wall guns.

Four 3-pounder, three 12-pounder, one 18-pounder cannon, and a destroyer battery were kept in reserve.

=== Hungarian order of battle ===
I. Corps
General József Nagysándor

1. (Kiss) division:

- 1. (Dipold) infantry brigade: 6. Honvéd battalion (6 companies: 590 soldiers), 26. Honvéd battalion (6 companies: 678 soldiers), 52. Honvéd battalion (6 companies: 622 soldiers), 6. six-pounder cavalry battery (169 soldiers, 10 horses with saddle, 130 horses for traction, 6 cannons), 1/2 Congreve rocket battery (25 soldiers, 6 horses with saddle, 7 horses for traction, 4 rocket launching racks) = 2084 soldiers, 16 horses with saddle, 137 horses for traction, 4 rocket launching racks;
- 2. (Driquet) infantry brigade: 44. Honvéd battalion (6 companies: 860 soldiers), 28. Honvéd battalion (6 companies: 650 soldiers), 47. Honvéd battalion (6 companies: 718 soldiers), 4. six-pounder infantry battery (176 soldiers, 9 horses with saddle, 102 horses for traction, 9 cannons) = 2404 soldiers, 9 horses with saddle, 102 horses for traction, 9 rocket launching racks;

Reserve (Máriássy) division:

- 3. (Gyika) infantry brigade: 3. battalion of the 39. infantry regiment (6 companies: 443 soldiers), 17. Honvéd battalion (6 companies: 749 soldiers) = 1192 soldiers;
- 4. (Nyeregjártó) infantry brigade: 19. Honvéd battalion (4 companies: 388 soldiers), 34. Honvéd battalion (6 companies: 701 soldiers), 1. twelve-pounder battery (175 soldiers, 14 horses with saddle, 108 horses for traction, 7 cannons) = 1264 soldiers, 14 horses with saddle, 108 horses for traction, 7 cannons;

Cavalry (Dessewffy) division:

- 1. (Imperial) Hussar Regiment (8 companies: 883 soldiers, 883 horses), 8. (Coburg) Hussar Regiment (4 companies: 384 soldiers, 384 horses), 1. six-pounder battery (144 soldiers, 20 horses with saddle, 105 horses for traction, 6 cannons) = 1411 soldiers, 1287 horses with saddle, 105 horses for traction, 6 cannons;

Ármin Görgey's raiding unit:

- 19. Honvéd battalion (2 companies: 200 soldiers), a detachment from Beniczky's troops (226 infantrymen).

II. Corps
Major General Lajos Aulich

4. (Hertelendy-Albert) division:

- 1. (Patay) infantry brigade: 39. (Dom Miguel) infantry regiment (6 companies: 520 soldiers, 3 horses with saddle), 48. Honvéd battalion (6 companies: 727 soldiers, 6 horses with saddle), 54. Honvéd battalion (6 companies: 743 soldiers, 7 horses with saddle), Vienna Legion (1 company: 118 soldiers), 1. six-pounder cavalry battery (166 soldiers, 16 horses with saddle, 94 horses for traction, 8 cannons), 5. six-pounder cavalry battery (133 soldiers, 10 horses with saddle, 69 horses for traction, 6 cannons) = 2407 soldiers, 42 horses with saddle, 14 cannons;
- 2. (Mándy) cavalry brigade: 6. (Württemberg) Hussar Regiment (6 cavalry companies: 573 soldiers, 592 horses), 12. (Nádor) Hussar Regiment (2 cavalry companies: 173 soldiers, 197 horses), 13. (Lehel) Hussar Regiment (1 cavalry company: 154 soldiers, 173 horses), sapper battalion (100 soldiers), 2. six-pounder infantry battery (119 soldiers, 6 horses with saddle, 73 horses for traction, 5 cannons), 5. three-pounder cavalry battery (61 soldiers, 4 horses with saddle, 31 horses for traction, 3 cannons) = 1180 soldiers, 942 horses with saddle, 104 horses for traction, 8 cannons;

5. (Szekulits) division:

- 3. (Mihály) infantry brigade: 25. Honvéd battalion (6 companies: 725 soldiers, 2 horses with saddle), 56. Honvéd battalion (6 companies: 997 soldiers, 4 horses with saddle), Bocskai legion (3 companies: 479 soldiers, 2 horses with saddle), 10. six-pounder infantry battery (140 soldiers, 15 horses with saddle, 90 horses for traction, 6 cannons) = 2341 soldiers, 23 horses with saddle, 90 horses for traction, 6 cannons;
- 4. (Buttler) infantry brigade: 60. Honvéd battalion (6 companies: 642 soldiers, 3 horses with saddle), 61. Honvéd battalion (6 companies: 1030 soldiers, 7 horses with saddle), 2. twelve-pounder infantry battery (199 soldiers, 24 horses with saddle, 123 horses for traction, 8 cannons) = 1871 soldiers, 34 horses with saddle, 123 horses for traction, 8 cannons;

III. Corps
Major General Károly Knezić

1. (Czillich) division:

- 1. (Podoski) infantry brigade: 9. Honvéd battalion (5 companies: 690 soldiers), 1. battalion of the 34. (Prince of Prussia) infantry regiment (4 companies: 480 soldiers), 3. battalion of the 34. (Prince of Prussia) infantry regiment (6 companies: 759 soldiers), [5.] six-pounder cavalry battery (178 soldiers, 10 horses with saddle, 117 horses for traction, 8 cannons) = 2107 soldiers, 10 horses with saddle, 117 horses for traction, 8 cannons;
- 2. (Almássy) infantry brigade: 3. battalion of the 60. (Wasa) infantry regiment (6 companies: 704 soldiers), 42. Honvéd battalion (6 companies: 605 soldiers), Selmec jägers (1 company: 89 soldiers), sappers (2 companies: 211 soldiers), six-pounder infantry battery (217 soldiers, 14 horses with saddle, 94 horses for traction, 8 cannons) = 1826 soldiers, 14 horses with saddle, 94 horses for traction, 8 cannons;

2. (Leiningen) division:

- 3. (Deszputh) infantry brigade: 3. battalion of the 52. (Karl Franz) infantry regiment (6 companies: 724 soldiers), 65. Honvéd battalion (6 companies: 880 soldiers), 1/2 Congreve rocket battery (36 soldiers, 3 horses with saddle, 12 horses for traction, 3 rocket launching racks) = 1640 soldiers, 2 horses with saddle, 12 horses for traction, 3 rocket launching racks;
- 4. (Földváry) infantry brigade: 3. Honvéd battalion (6 companies: 652 soldiers), 3 (Ferdinand d'Este) Hussar Regiment (6 companies: 438 soldiers, 438 horses), 3. six-pounder cavalry battery (147 soldiers, 14 horses with saddle, 96 horses for traction, 6 cannons) = 1403 soldiers, 1270 horses with saddle, 96 horses for traction, 6 cannons;

VII. Corps (1 division)

2. (Kmety) division:

- 1. (Gergelyi) infantry brigade: 10. Honvéd battalion (6 companies: 605 soldiers), 23. Honvéd battalion (6 companies: 772 soldiers), 33. Honvéd battalion (6 companies: 750 soldiers), 3. six-pounder cavalry battery (122 soldiers, 76 horses for traction, 7 cannons) = 2249 soldiers, 76 horses for traction, 7 cannons;
- 2. (Újváry) infantry brigade: 45. Honvéd battalion (6 companies: 875 soldiers), 2. Honvéd battalion of Beszterce (6 companies: 663 soldiers), Hungarian jägers (224 soldiers), sappers (1 company: 99 soldiers), 4. six-pounder cavalry battery (132 soldiers, 105 horses for traction, 8 cannons) = 2013 soldiers, 105 horses for traction, 8 cannons;
- 3. (Üchritz) cavalry brigade: 10 (Wilhelm) Hussar Regiment (6 companies: 520 soldiers, 520 horses) 5. six-pounder cavalry battery (101 soldiers, 85 horses for traction, 6 cannons) = (621 soldiers, 520 horses with saddle, 85 horses for traction, 6 cannons);

12. (Asbóth) independent reserve division:

- Infantry: 49. Honvéd battalion (547 soldiers, 6 horses with saddle), 63. Honvéd battalion (6 companies: 802 soldiers, 7 horses with saddle), company of Bereg (1 company: 118 soldiers, 1 horse with saddle), Raiding Platoon of Nagykőrös (152 soldiers, 1 horse with saddle), Pozsony jägers (224 soldiers), sapper battalion (1 company: 127 soldiers) = 1970 soldiers, 14 horses with saddle;
- Cavalry: 17 (Bocskai) Hussar Regiment (2 companies: 283 soldiers, 281 horses), Cuman horsemen (1 company: 86 soldiers, 86 horses with saddle), Polish Legion's cavalry (1 company: 217 soldiers, 255 horses with saddle) = (586 soldiers, 622 horses with saddle);
- Artillery: 11. six-pounder 1/2 battery (88 soldiers, 5 horses with saddle, 66 horses for traction, 3 cannons), 1. three-pounder 1/2 battery (1 company: 54 soldiers, 2 horses with saddle, 21 horses for traction, 4 cannons), 5. three-pounder battery (105 soldiers, 6 horses with saddle, 51 horses for traction, 6 cannons = (247 soldiers, 13 horses with saddle, 51 horses for traction, 13 cannons);

The total number of the different Hungarian units which participated in the siege of Buda:
- I. corps (Major General József Nagysándor): 9465 soldiers, 32 cannons;
- II. corps (Major General Lajos Aulich): 7799 soldiers, 36 cannons;
- III. corps (Major General Károly Knezić): 9419 soldiers, 30 cannons;
- VII. corps (15. Kmety division): 4883 soldiers, 21 cannons;
- 12. reserve division (Colonel Lajos Asbóth): 2711 soldiers, 13 cannons;
- Siege artillery sent by General Richard Guyon: 5 cannons.
Total: 34,277 soldiers, 142 cannons.

== The Hungarian march to Buda and preparations for the siege ==
After the relief of Komárom on 26 April, and the decision of the Hungarian commanders' council of war of 29 April to besiege Buda, I. Corps departed from Komárom towards Buda the next day. Formerly led by General János Damjanich, it was now commanded by General József Nagysándor, who took his excellent predecessor's place, because of an accident to the latter which rendered him unable to serve. This departure was in accordance with the orders issued the same day by the High Command of the Hungarian army, requiring all the designated troops to be on the march. Over the next few days, of the Hungarian forces stationed at Komárom, III. Corps also marched to Buda, while VII. Corps moved west to Győr, to observe the movements of the imperial armies on the western border of Hungary. General Lajos Aulich's II. Corps, whose troops were mainly on the eastern banks of the Danube, also received the order to cross to the other bank to participate in the encirclement of Buda castle, as did György Kmety's division at Esztergom.

Although the main Hungarian force moved towards Buda, they brought no heavy siege artillery with them, only field artillery, which unfortunately was not very effective in sieges. It seems that Görgei and the other Hungarian commanders thought Hentzi had not yet finished fortifying the castle for the siege, and that it could easily be occupied with a surprise attack if they arrived there quickly. So, the Hungarian army corps hurried to Buda, not wanting to be slowed down by the heavy artillery. This mistake by Görgei would prolong the siege for many days, losing time that could have been used for preparations for the offensive on the western front, because Hentzi timely strengthening of the castle made it impossible to take it without heavy siege artillery.

The Hungarian main body reached Buda on 4 May and gathered on the western bank of the river, surrounding the castle. Only Szekulits's division of II. Corps remained on the eastern side. The Hungarian units deployed as follows:

– Kmety's division northeast of the castle, next to the Danube in the Víziváros quarter of Buda,
– On Kmety's right, northwest of the castle, was General Károly Knezić’s III. Corps, in the sector between Kálvária Hill and Kissváb Hill,
– General József Nagysándor's I. Corps was deployed between Kissváb Hill and Little Gellért Hill,
– The sector between Little Gellért Hill and the Danube was occupied by II. Corps under General Lajos Aulich.

The Hungarians started to deploy their field artillery on the heights surrounding the castle: the Gellért Hill (one battery of six 6-pound cannon and one 7-pound howitzer), on Naphegy (half a rocket battery: 4 rocket stands), Kissváb Hill (one battery of three 12-pound cannon, two 7-pound cannon, and two 10-pound howitzers), Kálvária Hill and Kis-Rókus Hill (one battery of eleven 7-pound howitzers spread across the two). The battery closest to the castle was the one on Naphegy, 600–700 metres (2,000–2,300 ft) away. Altogether 5 batteries of artillery were deployed on the hills near the castle (25 cannon and howitzers and 4 rocket stands).

On 4 May, Görgei sent a captured Austrian officer as a messenger to ask Hentzi to surrender, proposing fair treatment. He argued that the castle was not suited to withstand a siege. Görgei also promised not to attack the castle from the side facing Pest, but that if Hentzi fired his artillery at Pest he would show no mercy and would have all prisoners executed after capturing the castle. Additionally, Görgei appealed to Hentzi's supposed Magyar sympathies (Hentzi having been born in Debrecen), but Hentzi replied that his loyalty was to the emperor. In the same reply, Hentzi also argued that the castle could be defended, and threatened Görgei, demanding that Görgei not attack the castle with artillery from any direction, or else Hentzi would destroy the city of Pest with a bombardment.

== Siege ==
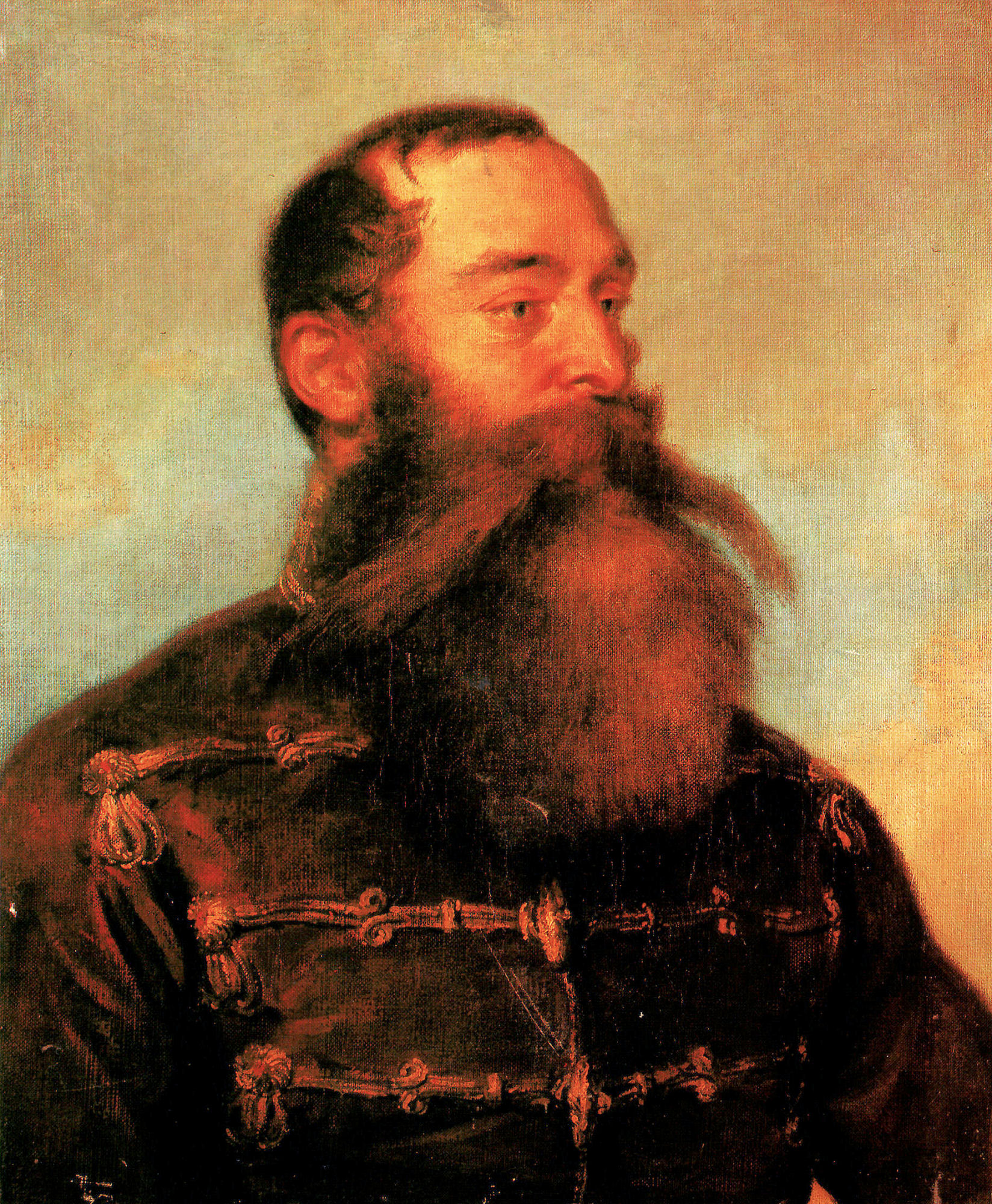
György Kmety by Károly Brocky

=== Attack against the water defences ===
After receiving this negative response from Hentzi, Görgei ordered his artillery to start bombarding the castle. But the defenders responded to this bombardment with even heavier fire, forcing the Hungarian batteries to change position in order not to be destroyed. This showed that, for the moment, the Hungarian field artillery was too weak against the imperial cannon. Another problem was that the Hungarian artillery did not have enough ammunition. On 6 May, General József Nagysándor wrote in his report that the ammunition had run out, and he was forced to cease bombarding the castle. He also wrote that if he did not receive the rockets and shells he requested, he would not be able to attack the aqueduct. In reality these weapons were already in Pest, having been sent via Szolnok by rail, but they were mislaid, and were only found a week later.

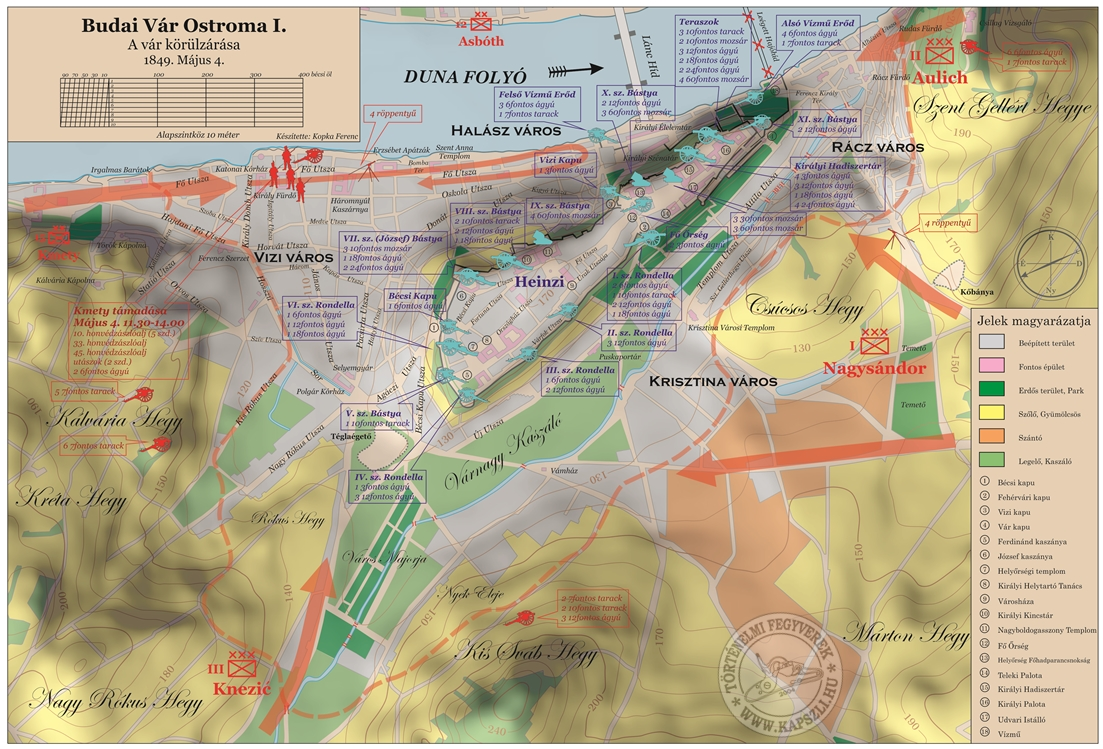
Buda may 4

On 4 May, Görgei sent Colonel György Kmety to attack the water defences between Castle Hill and the Danube, that being the only place outside the castle still occupied by the imperials; because if those could be captured, that would threaten the Austrian defenders' water supply. Kmety's order was to burn the Waterworks, which was surrounded by ramparts made of log piles. The Hungarian colonel led two battle-hardened battalions, the 10th and the 33rd, supported by two 6-pounder cannon.

When they approached the imperial defenses, Kmety's troops came under heavy artillery fire from their flank, from the Austrian units positioned on the Fisherman's Bastion and on the Joseph Bastion, and in their front from the defenders of the Watergate, the entrance to the Waterworks. Despite this, the 10th battalion reached the rampart, where the defenders unleashed grapeshot and an intense fusillade upon them, which forced them to retreat. Furthermore, Kmety and many of his soldiers were injured in this assault.

During the retreat the battalion disintegrated, and the soldiers sought refuge in the houses nearby. Supported by rockets and 6-pounder cannon fire, Kmety repeated the attack with the 33rd battalion, but again without success. The Hungarian losses were heavy. The attacking troops lost around 100 men, among which the 10th battalion alone lost 1/3 of its men: 37 jägers, 5 warrant officers, and 3 officers were dead or injured. After this, Kmety reported to Görgei that it was impossible to take the Waterworks, because the imperial cannon in the castle dominated the road to it, causing heavy losses to the attackers and preventing any chance of success.

During the attack on the Waterworks, Görgei ordered a cannonade against the castle from the surrounding Kis-Rókus and Naphegy hills, but the fire of the imperial artillery from the castle silenced the Hungarian batteries.

=== Before the arrival of the siege artillery ===
The failure of the attack on the Waterworks showed that the castle could not be taken by escalade, because of the great firepower of the imperial artillery and infantry, but only by breaching the walls of the castle with heavy siege artillery. This failure also made clear to Görgei that the conquest of the castle would not be an easy task, but would necessitate a long siege, conducted with heavy siege weapons, which the besieging troops presently lacked (they only had light field artillery). So he wrote to Richard Guyon, the commander of the fortress of Komárom, and ordered him to send siege guns from there. On 6, May General Guyon sent 5 cannon capable of breaching the walls (four 24-pounders and one 18-pounder), which arrived on 9 to 10 May, but with almost no ammunition.

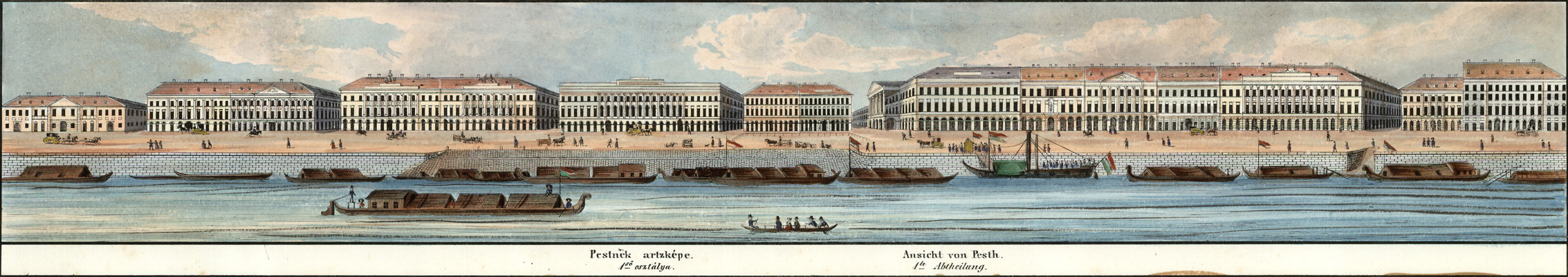
The shore of the Danube by Pest in 1837 1 before its destruction in 1849. By Carl Vasquez-Pinas von Löwenthal

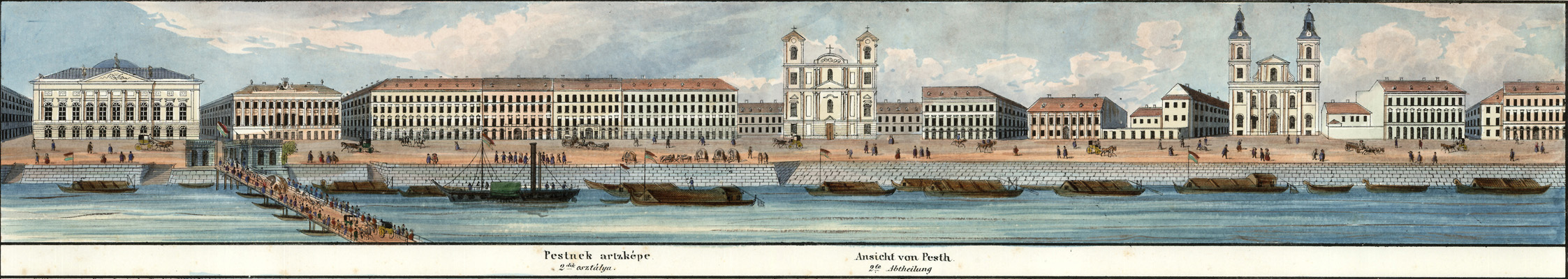
The shore of the Danube by Pest in 1837, before its destruction in 1849, 2. By Carl Vasquez-Pinas von Löwenthal

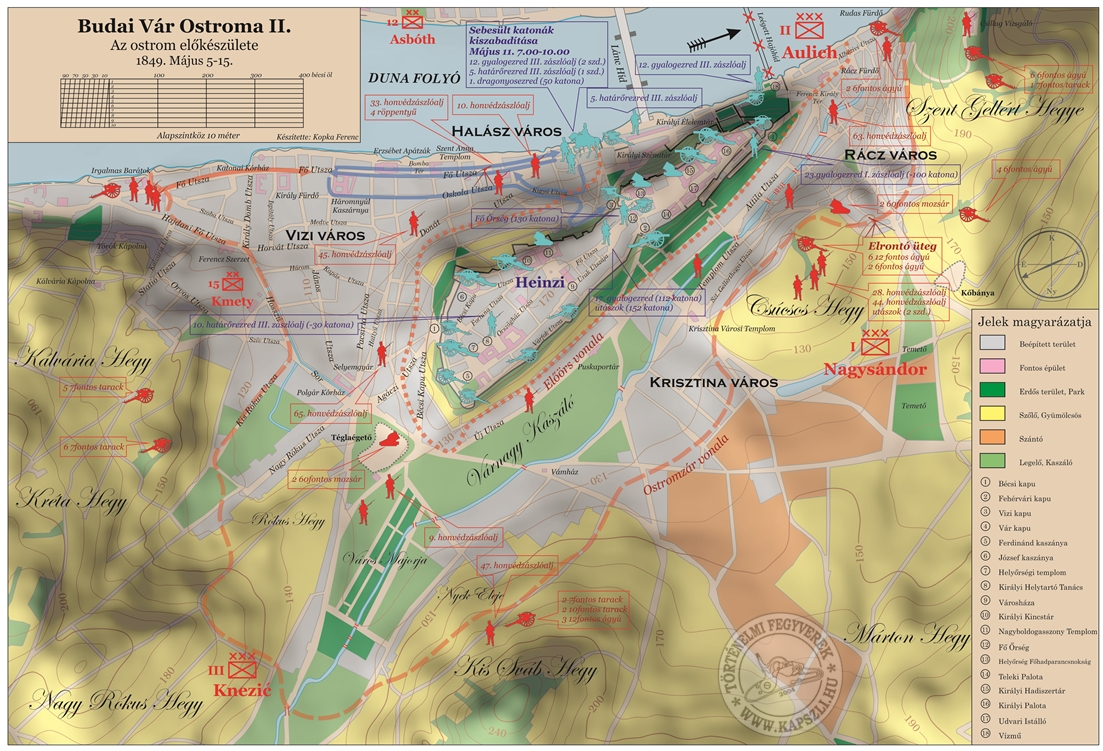
Buda may 5–16

In spite of all Görgei's solicitations, Guyon was reluctant to send the other siege guns to Buda, arguing that this would leave Komárom defenseless, despite the fact that these weapons were not actually part of the fortress's arsenal, because they were just captured from the imperials a few days earlier (26 April) in the Battle of Komárom. The English-born general only sent the rest of the siege cannon towards Buda after he was asked to do so by Governor Lajos Kossuth. While they waited for the arrival of the siege cannon from Komárom, Görgei ordered the construction of firing positions for a breaching battery and a field gun battery on Nap Hegy ("Sun Hill"), one of the hills in Buda, because he considered that the I. (Fehérvár) rondella, facing in that direction, was the weakest point of the castle. The field-gun battery was to cover the siege battery against fire from the castle. The batteries were more or less completed by 14 May, and the guns deployed in the early hours of the 16th.

During the wait for the siege artillery, Görgei ordered feinting night attacks against the castle, to keep the enemy busy and to divert Hentzi's attention from his true intent. Each army corps had to use four battalions, and the Kmety division two, for these attacks. The days of 5–7 May passed with only desultory artillery fire by both sides.

The besieging army was by no means inactive in the period between 5 and 16 May. In the early hours of 5 May, Kmety's forces again approached the water defences, whereupon Hentzi started to bombard the Water City (Víziváros), showing again that he had no concern for the lives of the civilian inhabitants; and the Hungarians withdrew.

On the 10th, an epidemic of cholera and typhus broke out among the defenders. On the night of 10–11 May, Hentzi ordered a sortie to rescue the wounded and sick Austrians from the Víziváros hospitals. A border guard company and a sapper detachment took part. The first attempt was beaten back, but when the imperial troops led by Captain Schröder tried again in greater force at 7 am, they were successful, liberating 300 sick Austrian soldiers, and causing heavy losses to Kmety's troops stationed there.

On 12 May the action continued with minor skirmishes, and on the 13th with an artillery duel.

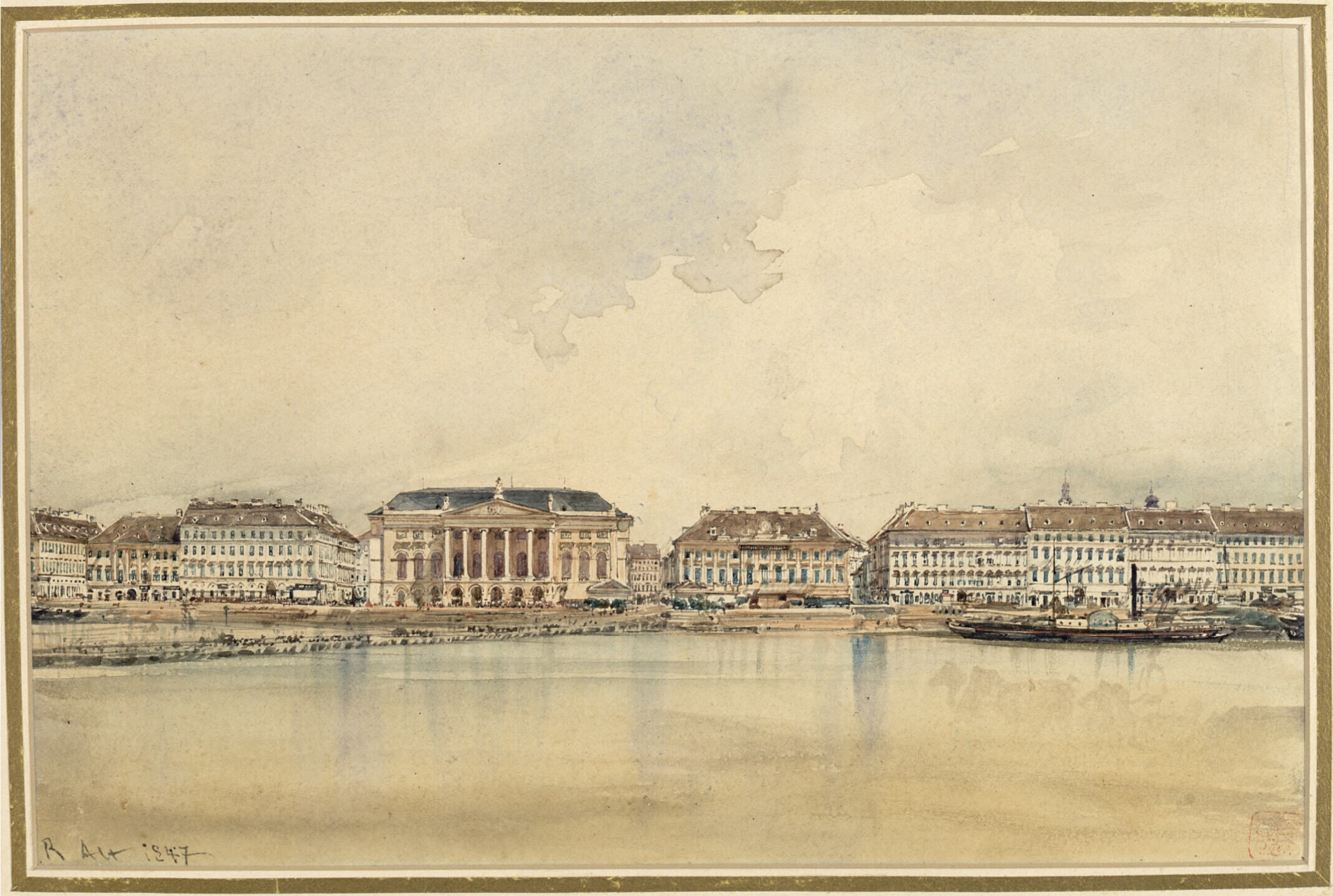
Rudolf von Alt – Lower Danube Row in Pest, 1847, before its destruction in May 1849

At first, Hentzi paid no attention to the construction of the siege batteries by the Hungarians, and put all of his effort into fulfilling his pledge to fire on Pest. His rage was not tempered even by a delegation of the people of Buda, who begged him to stop the destruction of the city, saying that if he did not accept this they would leave the castle. Hentzi replied that they could leave the castle if they wished, but threatened that he would bombard Pest with explosive and incendiary projectiles if the Hungarian army did not stop the siege. The next day around 300 citizens left the castle of Buda. Unfortunately, Hentzi kept his promise and firing went on nearly every day from 4 May onwards, and became particularly intense on 9 and 13 May, resulting in the burning and destruction of the beautiful neoclassical buildings of the Al-Dunasor (Lower Danube Row). The population of Pest fled from the bombardment to outside the city. Hentzi's attack on the civilian buildings and the population was contrary to the rules of war, and was condemned by the Hungarian commanders. On the 13th, Görgei wrote a letter to Governor Kossuth about the destruction caused by Hentzi's senseless bombardment:

Last night commander Hentzi fulfilled his promise gruesomely. With well-aimed shots he managed to set the splendid Danube Row on fire in several places. Helped by the strong wind, the fire spread rapidly, and reduced the most beautiful part of Pest to ashes. – It was a terrible sight! The whole city was covered by a sea of flames, and the burning bombshells showered like a rain of stars, thundering grimly in the swirling smoke, onto the poor town. It is impossible to describe this sight accurately; but in this whole phenomenon I saw the burning of the torch lit for the funeral feast of the dying Austrian dynasty, because for those in this country who had the smallest consideration for this perfidious dynasty, yesterday's events obliterated it forever. This is why although I mourn the destruction of the capital city with all my heart, this outrageous act of the enemy, which I was powerless to prevent and which I did nothing to provoke, will make me try with all my power to avenge it by making even greater efforts to besiege the castle, and I feel it my most sacred duty to liberate the capital as soon as possible from this monstrous enemy.

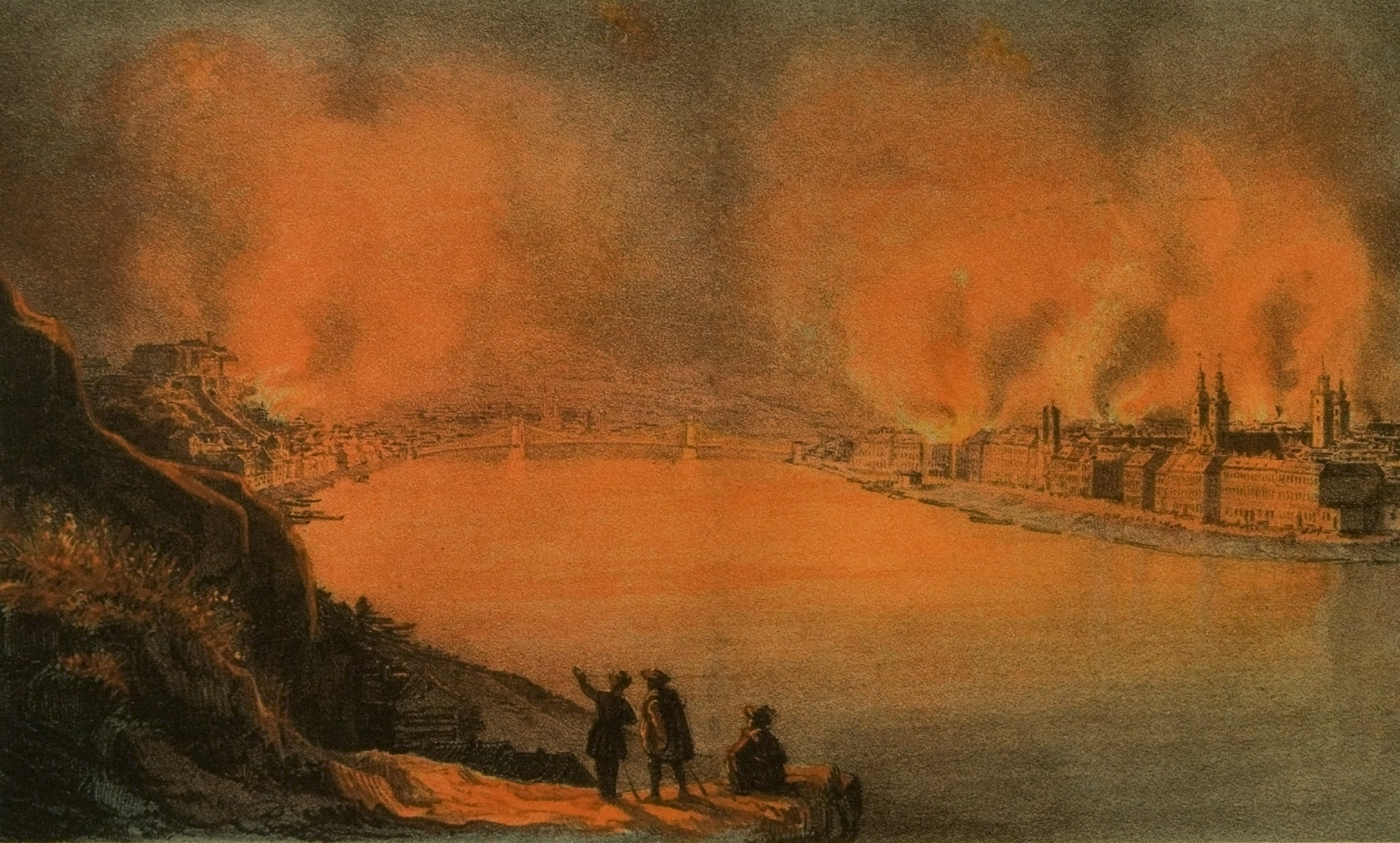
Bombardment of Pest 1849

The 17-year-old Hungarian soldier Emil Büttner wrote in his letter about the "beauty" of the gruesome spectacle of the nocturnal artillery and rocket duel which caused such huge destruction to Pest and Buda:

This offers us a gruesomely beautiful spectacle, when every night the shellfire begins, the whole area is on fire, the mortars firing their bombs flash here and there, followed each time by a hollow murmur. The sparkling bomb whizzes through the sky like a fiery dragon, often you can see as many as 8–10 of them in the air at the same time, and every one of them is followed by a howling 24-pounder [bomb]. Many of those that were poorly targeted explode in the air, and the flames pour out of their ripped orbs like squeezed lightning, followed every time by a horrible crack, their fragments whirr with different noises, dispersing in every direction, smashing and crushing whatever stands in their way. What kind of roaring and growling causes the constant howling of the cannon, the bursting shells and bombs of the enemy, and the unceasing salvoes from our guns from every direction? You can imagine they are a bit like the thunder heard sometimes in great thunderstorms.

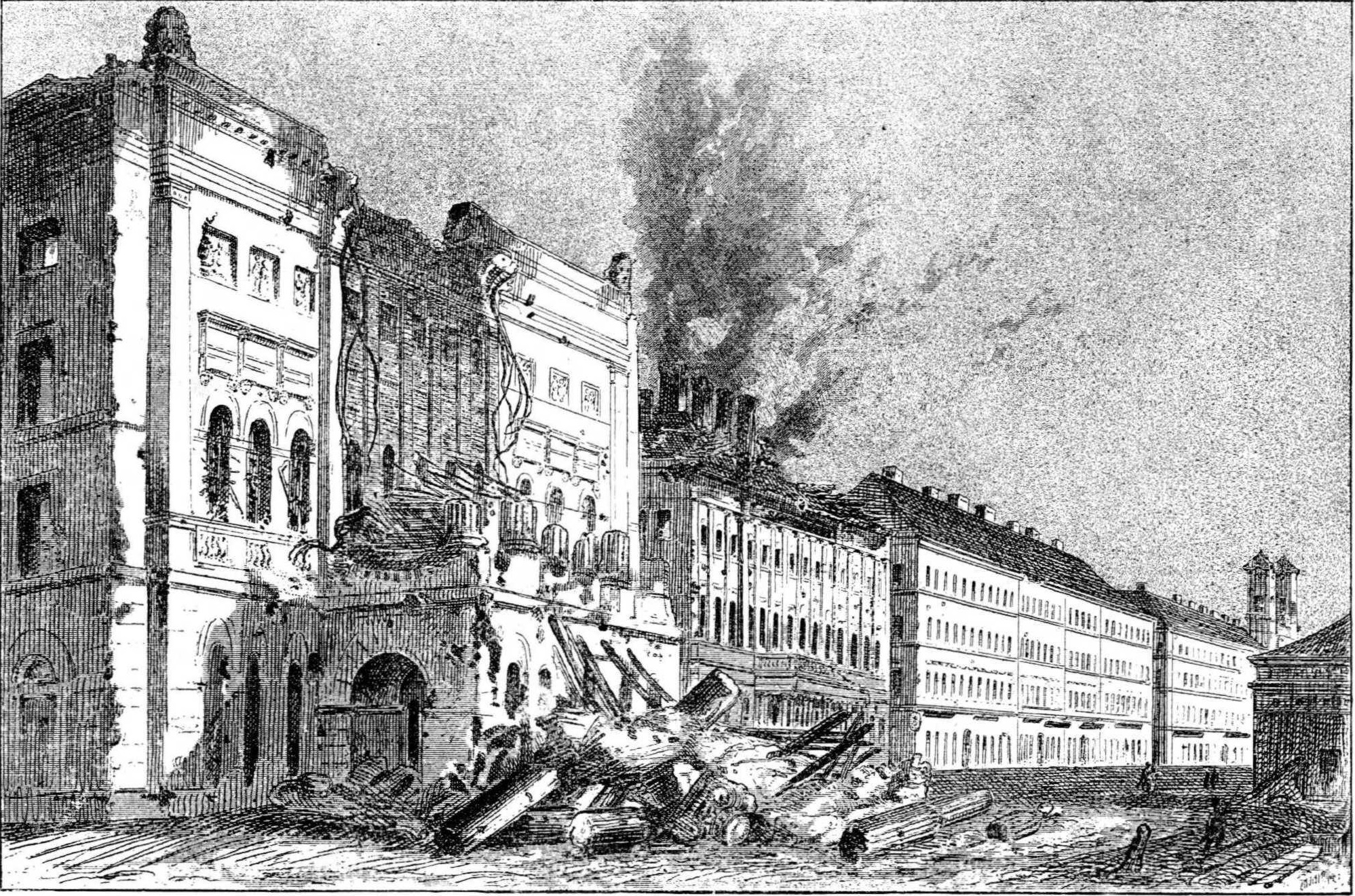
The damages caused by the bombardment of Pest by the imperials: Lower Danube Row

Büttner writes the following thoughts about the sight of the rockets used by the two armies, which were a relatively recent military innovation:

I never saw anything more beautiful. The many rockets slashed crackling through the air like fiery snakes, blistering and sparkling on their way, and if they fell through a window or roof, they lit up the surroundings in the most beautiful way, then after they burst they set fire to everything that was flammable.

Görgei wanted to retaliate for the Austrian bombardment of Pest and avenge this destructive attack. He ordered the three huge telescopes from the observatory on Gellért Hill to be brought to his headquarters, and posted his officers to observe through them. If Hentzi appeared on the walls of the castle, then a Hungarian officer who had a very loud voice used a large tin megaphone to tell the artillery officers on Kis-Svábhegy Hill where to fire their cannon. Although they did not manage to kill the Austrian commander, they came close many times, forcing Hentzi and his officers to run down from the walls. After that Hentzi rarely showed himself on the castle's defensive walls and bastions; and when he did so, he did not stand still for long, finishing his inspections very quickly.

In the night of 14 May, Hentzi tried to destroy the pontoon bridge from the Csepel Island by floating 5 fireships and two vessels loaded with stones down the river; but because of the lack of sappers charged with this task, only one vessel was lit before they released them into the stream. These ships did not float down the middle of the river as expected but close to the shore, where they were spotted by the Hungarian sappers at the Rudas Baths, who then approached them by boat and towed them to shore.

=== The real siege begins ===
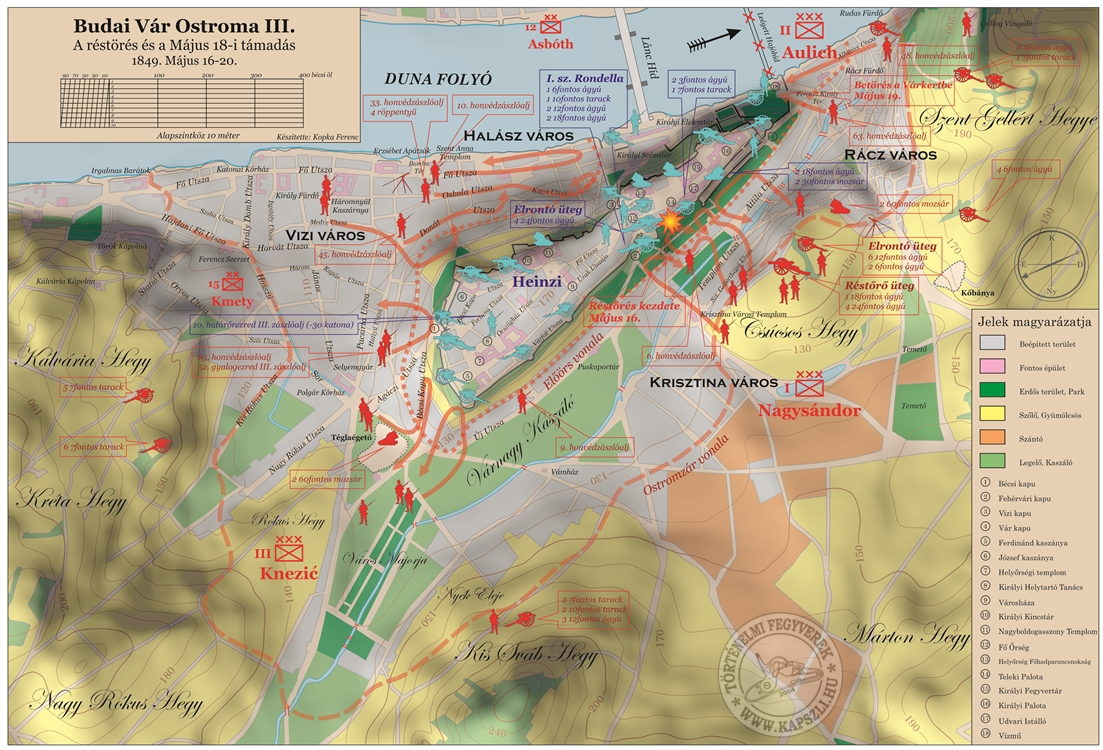
Buda, 16–20 May

After the arrival of its heavy siege artillery, the Hungarian army's artillery was finally superior to that of the defenders; and on 16 May the real bombardment of the castle began. After the installation of the siege cannon, the Hungarian artillery deployed for an effective siege in the following way:

– In Pest at the Ullmann tobacco warehouse: half a 6-pounder battery,
– On Margaret Island half a 6-pounder battery,
– At the port for steamboats from Óbuda: half a 6-pounder battery. This was tasked with preventing any activity by the Nádor steamboat, which was in Austrian hands,
– Bomba Square: one 6-pounder cannon and one 7-pounder howitzer,
– In the first Kálvária Hill position: one 6-pounder battery, – In the second Kálvária (Calvary) Hill position: some 12-pounder cannon and six 10-pounder howitzers,
– At the Vienna Gate brick factory: two 60-pounder mortars,
– Kissváb Hill: a battery of 12-pounder and 18-pounder cannon, with a furnace to heat the cannonballs,
– On the left side of Naphegy Hill: one breaching battery of 24-pounder cannon,
– On the right side of Naphegy Hill: some 12-pounder and 18-pounder cannon on 16 platforms behind a trench,
– Along the Calvary stations on the road to Gellért Hill: four 18-pounder cannon,
– On the crest of Gellért Hill: two 24-pounder cannon and a furnace to heat the cannonballs,
– On the slope of Gellért Hill towards Rácváros: four 18-pounder and two 60-pounder mortars,
– On Gellért Hill on the road to the Calvary: one 10-pounder howitzer,
– On Gellért Hill, 200 paces down, near a vineyard: one 10-pounder howitzer,
– To the left of that: one 12-pounder battery,
– In a dug-out near the highest Calvary station: two 60-pounder bomb mortars,
– Behind parapets near the Danube, level with the Rudas Baths: one 12-pounder cannon and a 10-pounder howitzer,
– In Rácváros, at the Zizer house: one 24-pounder cannon.

With these cannon, together with those the army had before, the Hungarians could shoot cannonballs inside the castle, constantly disturbing the defenders’ rest and their troop movements. The siege artillery finally started its work on 16 May, shooting at the walls but also at buildings within the castle that were reported by spies to be the depots and barracks of the enemy troops. Continuous firing began at 4 o'clock in the morning and went on until 6 o'clock in the afternoon. By the next day the section of wall south of the Fehérvár Rondella had been breached.

16 May was when Hentzi sensed that the siege was reaching a critical stage. He realized that the main Hungarian attack would not come from the east against the Waterworks, but from the west, against the breach created by the Hungarian artillery at the Fehérvár rondella. In his council of war that night, he proposed continuing to bombard Pest; but engineering captain Philipp Pollini objected, arguing that it would be better to fire on the Hungarian artillery, in order to try to destroy it. The council accepted Pollini's plan. So, at 18:30 all the cannon which had been withdrawn earlier to protect them were sent back to the walls to duel with the Hungarian cannon.

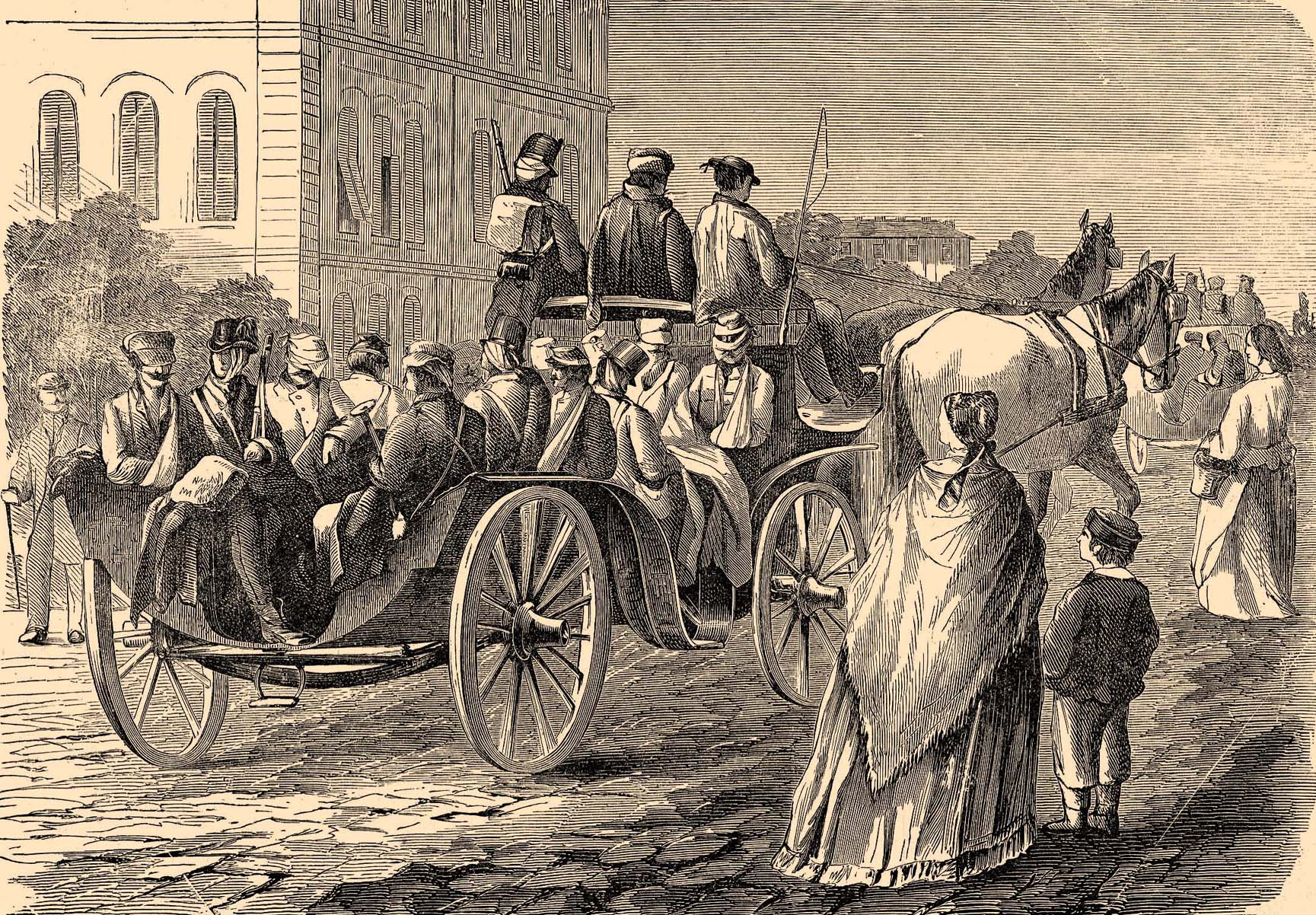
Transporting of the wounded at the siege of Buda

Firing continued into the evening, and one round set fire to the roof of the palace. In revenge, Hentzi fired on Pest again the next day. This so enraged Görgei that he ordered his forces to carry out a reconnaissance in force in the early hours of 18 May; and if the action was sufficiently successful, it would be converted into a full assault. I. Corps was to attack the breach in the Fehérvár Rondella, III. Corps to scale the IV. rondella with siege ladders, and Kmety's division was to make a demonstration attack against the Waterworks.

In the dark, the soldiers of I. Corps lost their way towards the breach, and when they finally found it, it was already dawn, so they were spotted by the defenders, targeted by grapeshot and a hail of bullets, and were forced to retreat. III. Corps attacked from the north and climbed the walls with their ladders, but the defenders repelled the attack, causing 34 dead and the loss of 21 ladders. The house that was the 65th battalion's base was set on fire by the enemy artillery, so the Hungarian soldiers could not retreat into it but had to run across open ground under fire from the defenders. The 9th battalion had orders to fire on the defenders from the windows and roofs of the houses in Attila Street. The other battalions of III. corps gathered in the nearby houses and tried to climb the walls on ladders; but because the ladders were too short, this attack, too, was unsuccessful. The soldiers of the 9th battalion were so busy firing on the enemy that they did not hear their comrades retreat. So, they were trapped in the houses when dawn arrived, and could not retreat next day, because the defenders immediately fired on any who tried to come out of the houses. II. Corps attacked the Waterworks with the bayonet, but was repelled. Kmety's troops also attacked the Waterworks, reaching the Watergate, but there they were halted and forced to engage in a futile firefight with the enemy.

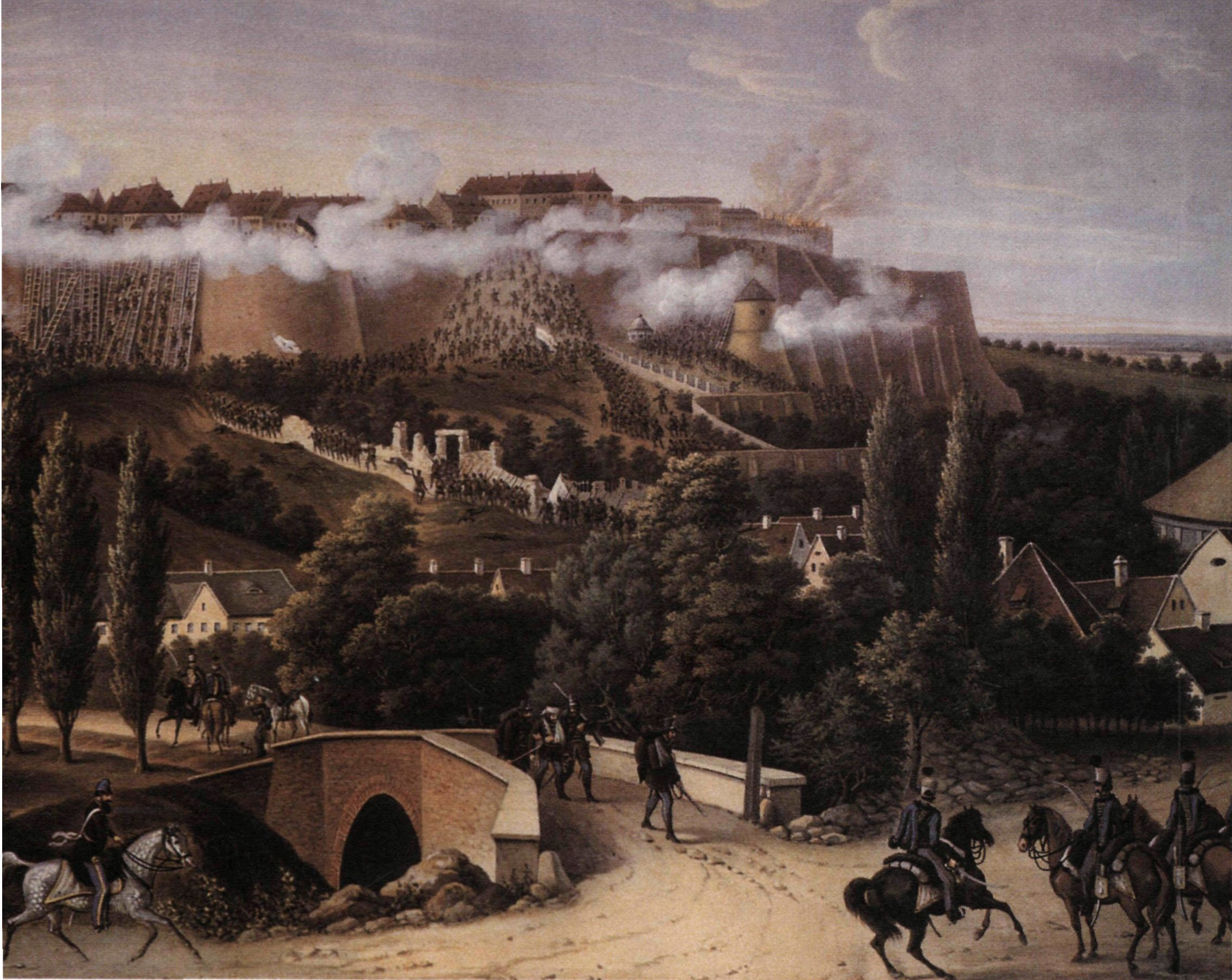
Bombardment and assault of the Castle of Buda, 1849, by Károly Klette

The attack failed; the causes of the failure were many: the approach to the walls was hindered by a system of obstacles put in place by the castle garrison; the breach was not large enough to be climbed; the ladders brought by the soldiers were too short; and the attacks were not well coordinated, nor did units receive clear instructions about when to turn the demonstration into a real attack. In his memoirs Görgei acknowledges that the failure is mainly his fault, because he did not check beforehand whether the breach was large enough to be passable. He wrote that he ordered the attack rashly because he was angry at Hentzi's bombardment of Pest, and wanted to punish him by taking the castle as quickly as possible. The Hungarians lost around 200 men in this abortive attack. After the attack Görgei asked for more ladders, which arrived from Pest a day later, on 19 May.

On 18 May, Hentzi tried to fill the breach near the Fehérvár rondella, but a downpour during the night washed away the barrier. A battery was set up on the Fehérvár Rondella, which succeeded in temporarily silencing two Hungarian guns on 19 May, but the breach grew ever wider, to 30 metres (98 ft) wide, becoming unfillable. That night, another attempt was made to block the gap, but heavy artillery fire and musketry from the Hungarian side prevented the imperial engineers from doing an effective job. A sapper unit of the Hungarian II. Corps managed to break into the Várkert (Castle Garden, next to the southern tip of the Castle walls and the Waterworks) through a house which had a wall in common with the garden, and a Hungarian Honvéd company sneaked in. Despite all the efforts of the defenders, it could not be forced to retreat.

On 20 May, Hentzi again ordered that the breach by the Fehérvár rondella be filled; but although the sappers made a 1.7-metre-wide (5.6 ft) improvised parapet on top of the breach, the gap itself could not be filled, because the Hungarian artillery kept it under heavy fire. However, another attack against the breach was not an easy task, because the imperial artillery on the I. rondella could bring fire to bear on the entrance to the breach and the area around it. During these actions engineering captain Philipp Pollini, who led the vain efforts to barricade the gap, was killed by Hungarian gunfire.

Seeing the intensification of the Hungarian siege, and the effectiveness of the Hungarian artillery, the defenders' morale fell. An Austrian deserter told the Hungarians that: "... the soldiers in the castle are depressed, wanting to escape from the siege".

After the failure of the assault on the night of 17–18 May, Görgei ordered a detachment of a few companies to harass the defenders every night until 2 am. At 2 am all the firing stopped. Görgei's plan was to make the defenders believe that after that time they would be safe and could rest until morning. Then, on 20 May, he issued the order to storm the castle. On the night of 20 to 21 May, the Hungarian artillery bombarded the castle until 2 o'clock in then morning as usual, then stopped.

=== Final assault ===
The decisive assault was to start at 3 am on 21 May after every piece of ordnance had fired on the castle from every direction. Before the assault Görgei tried to raise the soldiers’ morale by promising a reward to whichever soldier took Hentzi prisoner. After the sudden bombardment of the imperial defenders, who thought at 2 o'clock that there would be no more fighting until the morning, the Hungarian attack began. II. Corps, led by General Lajos Aulich, assaulted from the south; three battalions attacked the southern Palace Gardens (Palotakert), while two stormed the Waterworks, the other units of the corps remaining in reserve. The soldiers of II Corps soon penetrated the castle via the large garden at the west wall. Not having ladders, they climbed the walls on each other's shoulders. The attackers entered by ladders at the Ferdinand Gate and over the rubble of the destroyed wall on the east side facing the Danube. Here, the imperial soldiers were soon surrounded and laid down their weapons.

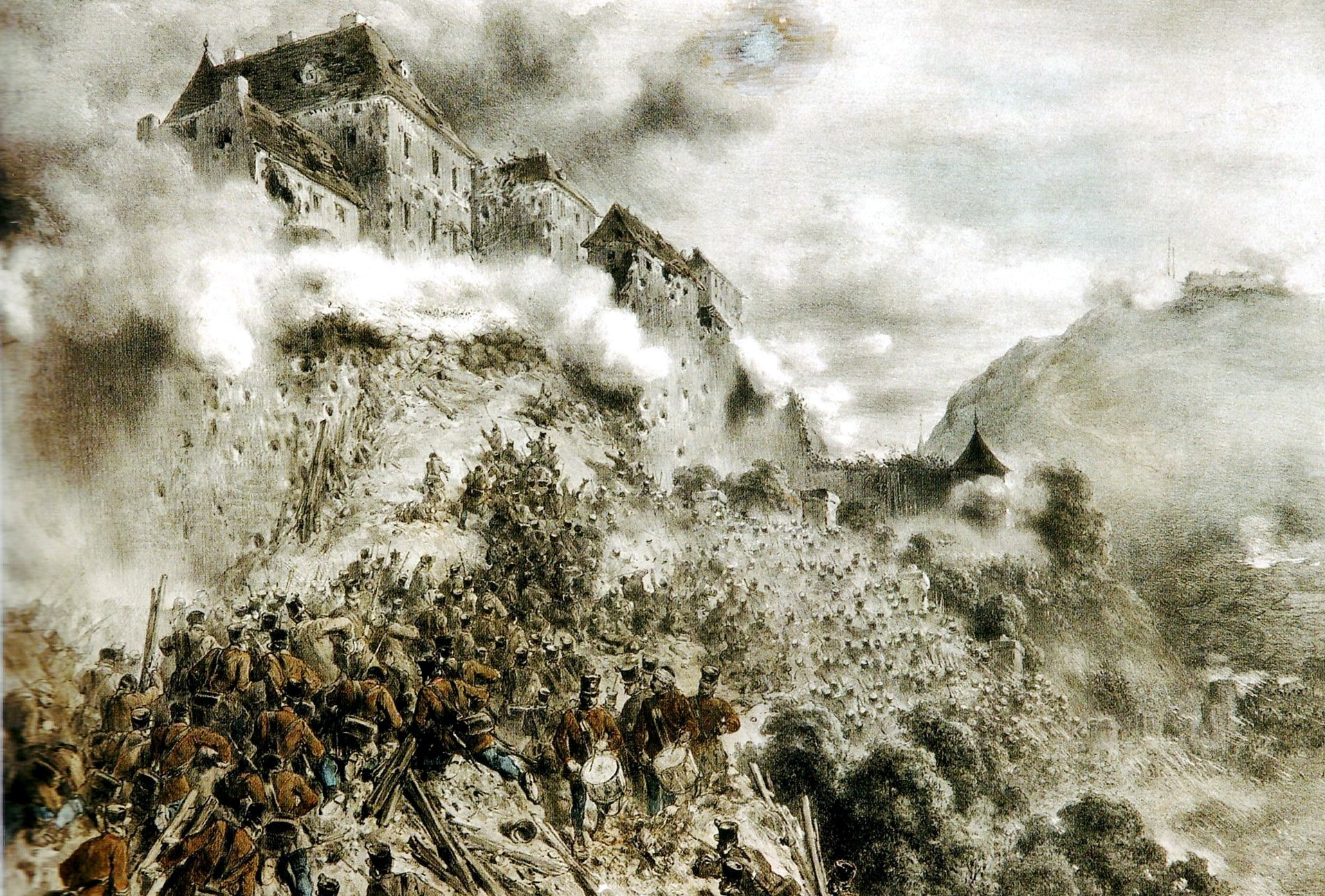
August von Pettenkofen – Siege of Buda

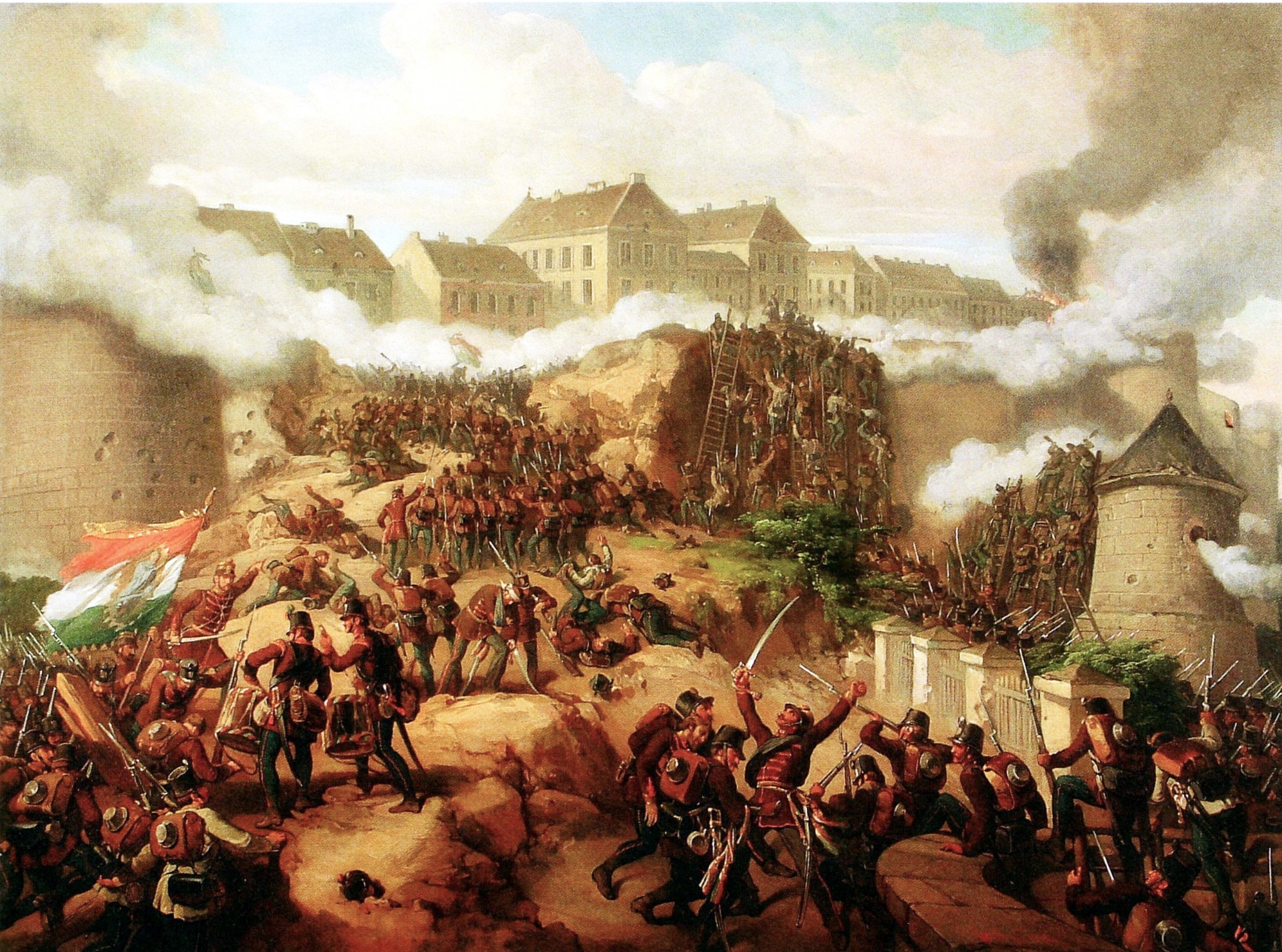
Siege of Buda: Attack against the gap, by Károly Jakobey

Kmety's division had the task of capturing the Waterworks from the north, sending three battalions and a jäger company to carry out the initial assault. The main attacks occurred on the northern and western sides of the castle, where the Hungarian I. and III. Corps attacked. Two battalions of I. Corps, led by General József Nagysándor in person, started the attack on the northern side, charging into the breach, while four battalions attacked the terraces on the southwest side of Castle Hill. The rest of I. Corps remained in reserve.

The 28th, 44th, and 47th battalions advanced undetected right up to the breach, where they were spotted by the surprised defenders, who however resisted fiercely, stopping the Hungarians for a while, with the help of concentrated fire from front and flanks from the Austrian soldiers on the walls and bastions nearby. Then, Nagysándor ordered the 3rd Battalion of the 39th (Don Miguel) Infantry Regiment, and part of the 17th Battalion as well, to come up from reserve and join the attack. The covering fire of the Hungarian artillery caused the defenders huge losses.

Thanks to this and the determination of the attackers, Col. János Máriássy, one of the I. Corps divisional commanders, managed to lead two battalions through the castle gardens against the flank of the Austrians holding the breach, and thus enabled the main assault to get through. During the charge the Hungarian soldiers lived through infernal scenes:

It was horrible to watch, at the foot of the bastion, how the grapeshot swept away 3 or 4 [soldiers] at once, how the enemy cannonballs, fired from the other side, swept away entire ranks, how the bursting shells ripped out their intestines, tore off the hands, legs and heads from many of them. You could see here legs, hands, fragments of skull lying on the ground, dead men's intestines hanging down, blood and marrow dripping down from many of the ladders around the walls, many of them [the Hungarian soldiers] were struck dead by pieces of blown-up ladders, others by grenades with burning fuzes dropped or thrown down and then bouncing [in every direction] from the walls onto the crowd below, and others by pieces of stone and bricks smashed off the walls by cannonballs.

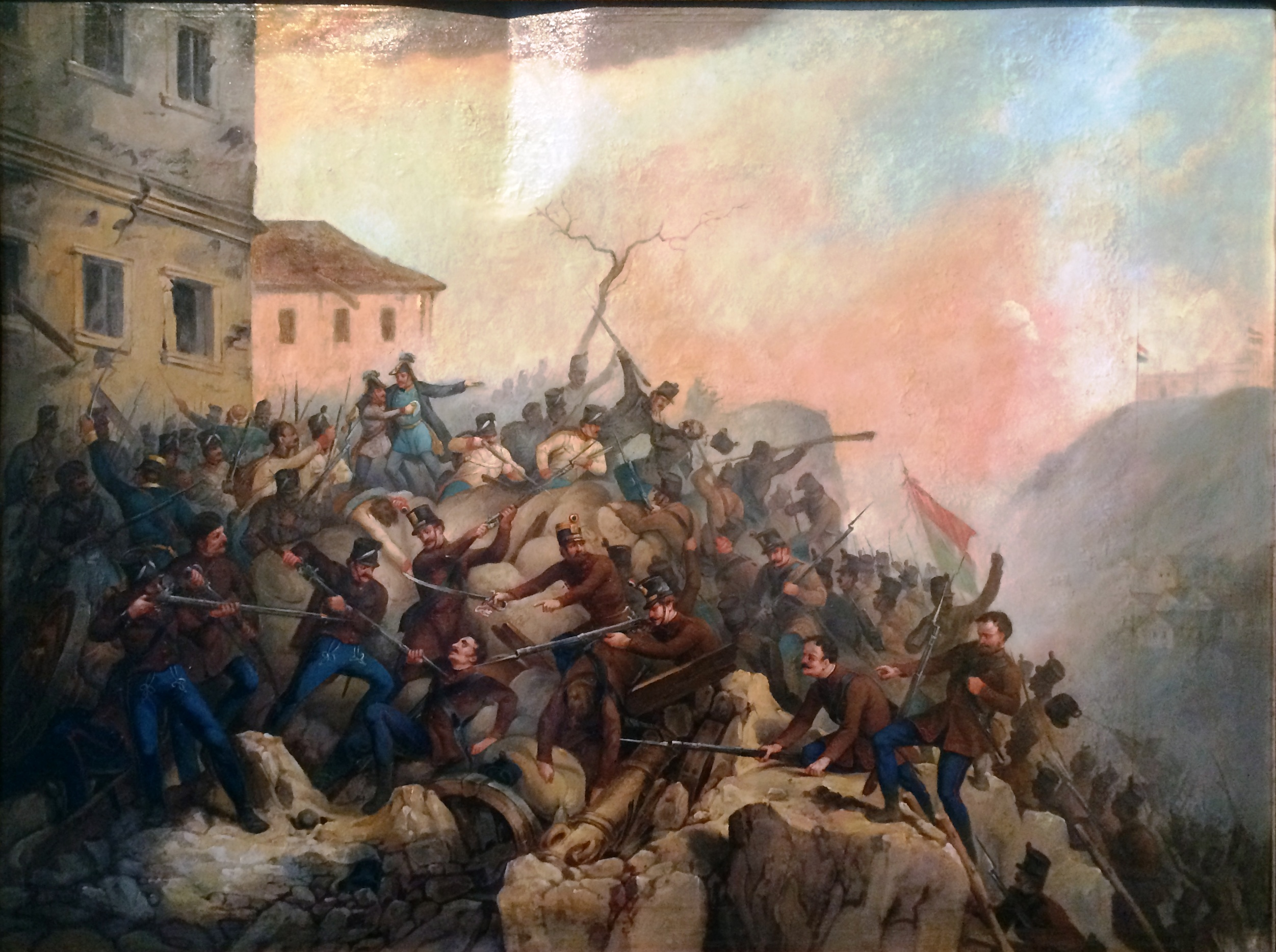
The siege of Buda, by Anton Strassgschwandtner

At this point Col. Máriássy fell down for a couple of minutes because a blast hit him, and a cannonball smashed three ladders, which made his troops retreat. But the 400 Hungarians who were already on the walls started to yell and wave Hungarian flags, urging their fellows to return to the attack and not leave them to fall into the hands of the enemy. Then Máriássy regained consciousness, rallied his men and led them, with support by the 6th Battalion, against the enemy who were already starting to topple the ladders. When the Hungarians started to climb the ladders, the enemy soldiers (who were of Italian origin) decided to surrender, and reached out their hands in order to help the Hungarians climb up. The Hungarian losses in the assault were heavy: among many others was Major Burdina, the commander of the Don Miguel regiment.

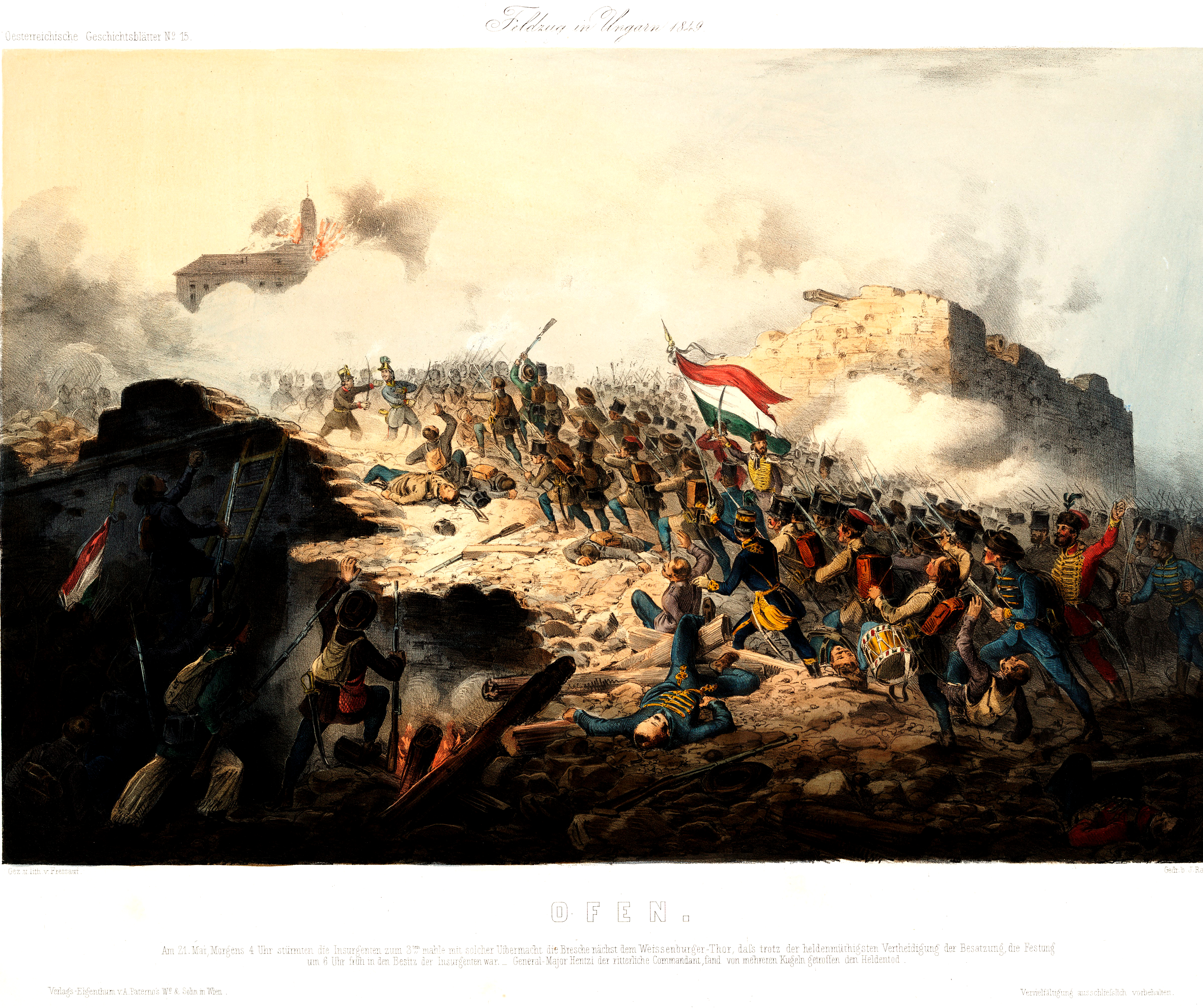
Siege of Buda: Attack against the gap

Other Italian soldiers among the imperial troops also preferred not to fight against the Hungarian soldiers, sympathizing with them because they understood the Hungarian cause, as their country was in revolt against the Austrian Empire as well. Because of this they were the first enemy troops to surrender when they saw the Hungarian soldiers approaching. For example, in the southwestern sector where the Palatine stables were, the soldiers of the 26th Battalion, which scaled the walls on ladders and on bayonets stuck in between the bricks, were welcomed by Italian soldiers shouting: Evviva Ungheria! (Long live Hungary!). After they entered the castle, the advancing Hungarians found around 30 imperial soldiers shot dead in a courtyard. One who was still alive told them that they had been shot by the Croatian soldiers. This probably happened because the imperial command or the Croatian soldiers themselves noticed that the Italians were reluctant to fight against the Hungarians.

Thus, the Hungarian troops entered through the breach. The first Hungarian flag was raised on the wall of Buda castle by Grácián Püspöky, the young standard-bearer of the 47th Honvéd Battalion. The first units to break into the castle through the gap were the 44th and 47th. Honvéd Battalions, led by Lieutenant-Colonel Peter Driquet; the "Don Miguel" infantry, supported by the fire of their comrades from the 34th and 17th Battalions, who climbed the wall east of the rondella; and by the 4th Battalion, who fired down from behind them and drove the defenders deeper and deeper into the streets of Buda castle. The Hungarians who entered the castle faced enemy infantry and artillery units at strategic points, who fired volleys and grapeshot at them; but they continued the assault, overwhelming, killing, or capturing the imperial soldiers.

During these events one battalion charged south. Although the 6th Battalion, under Captain Gergely Szalkay, was supposed to protect the siege guns, when they saw the first assault repulsed they charged toward the castle. When they entered, at first they were pinned down around the stables by enemy fire. Szalkay ordered a charge which overcame the enemy opposition, occupying the arsenals and the Sándor Palace. Then, he sent some of his troops onto the wall above the Waterworks to help Kmety's assault by firing on the enemy from the rear, and others to the armory south of Saint George Square to fire on the imperials who were in the Palatine Gardens defending the southern wall against II. Corps's attack. Szalkay then occupied the Palatine (Royal) Palace with the rest.

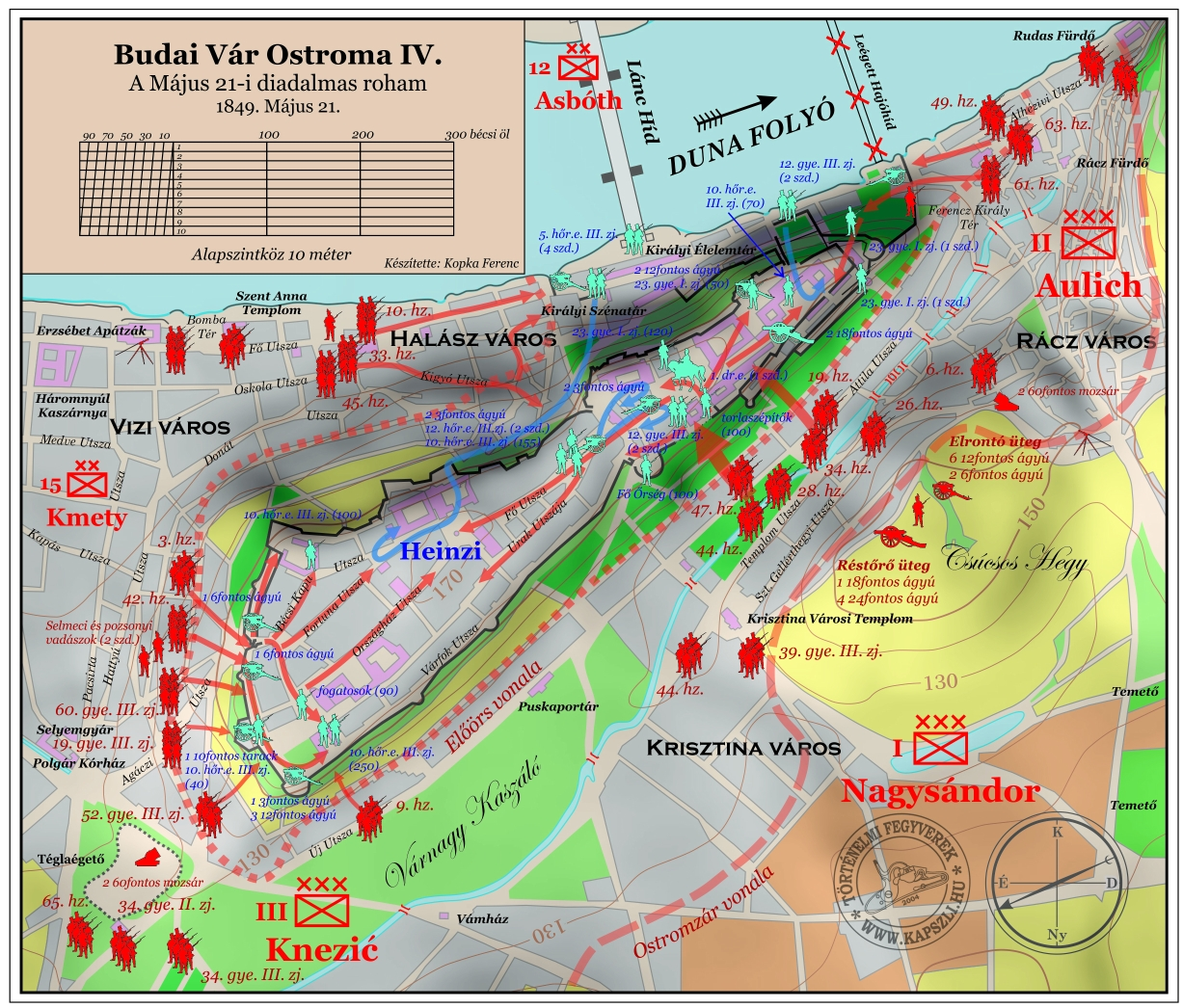
Buda, 21 May

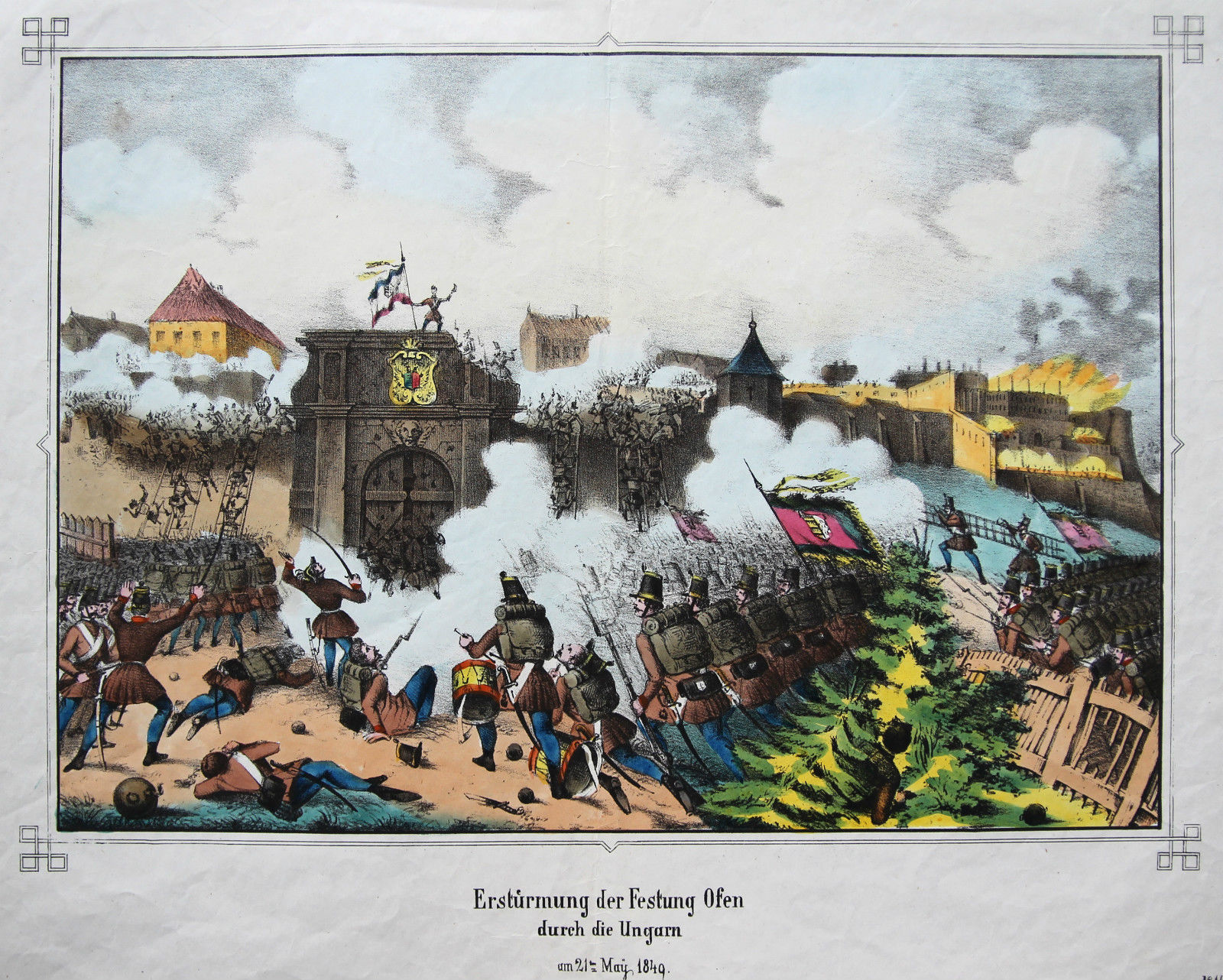
Siege of Buda 1849: Attack against the Vienna Gate

The 63rd Battalion attacked the walls from Krisztinaváros. During the attack, the soldiers raising the ladders were wounded by the defenders' fire; but when their comrades started to climb, the shots from above became fewer and fewer as the defenders abandoned the walls, seeing the Hungarians pouring into the castle through the main breach, and retreated into the streets of Buda. Because they entered the castle after the main body had got in through the breach, the 63rd did not encounter serious resistance when they advanced towards Saint George Square (Szent György Tér).

While I. and II. Corps were involved on the southern and western sides of the Castle, III. Corps attacked the wider northern side. The designated units of III. Corps (3rd and 42nd Honvéd battalions, the 3rd Battalion of the 19th Infantry Regiment, and the 3rd Battalion of the 60th Infantry Regiment), led by General Károly Knezić, mounted an assault on the northern castle wall, the Vienna Gate, and the Esztergom Rondella, supported by the 9th Battalion firing from houses in Attila street, while III. Corps's reserves waited between the Városmajor and the brick factory. The attackers tried to scale the Vienna Gate and the neighboring stretch of wall, and 30 Hungarian soldiers fell in this fight. The men of the 42nd Battalion were the first to climb the walls and enter, while the 3rd Battalion broke into the castle at the Vienna Gate. Then, after the first troops had entered the castle, the 9th Battalion joined them, climbing the ladders near the Vienna Gate, and then manned the captured enemy guns near the 4th rondella, turning them against the retreating imperial soldiers.

The attackers then started to advance along Úri Street and Országház Street towards the Fehérvár Gate and the Szent György Square to help I. Corps. The defenders therefore found themselves under fire from two sides, from I. and III. Corps. At 4 am, the Italian soldiers of the Ceccopieri regiment, who were fighting on the western walls of the southern end of the Castle Hill, by the Palace, in the region of the Riding Hall (Lovarda) and the Stables, surrendered. Thanks to this, around 500 Hungarian soldiers got into Saint George Square (Szent György tér). At 5 am, Gen. József Nagysándor reported to Görgei that there were nine battalions in the castle.

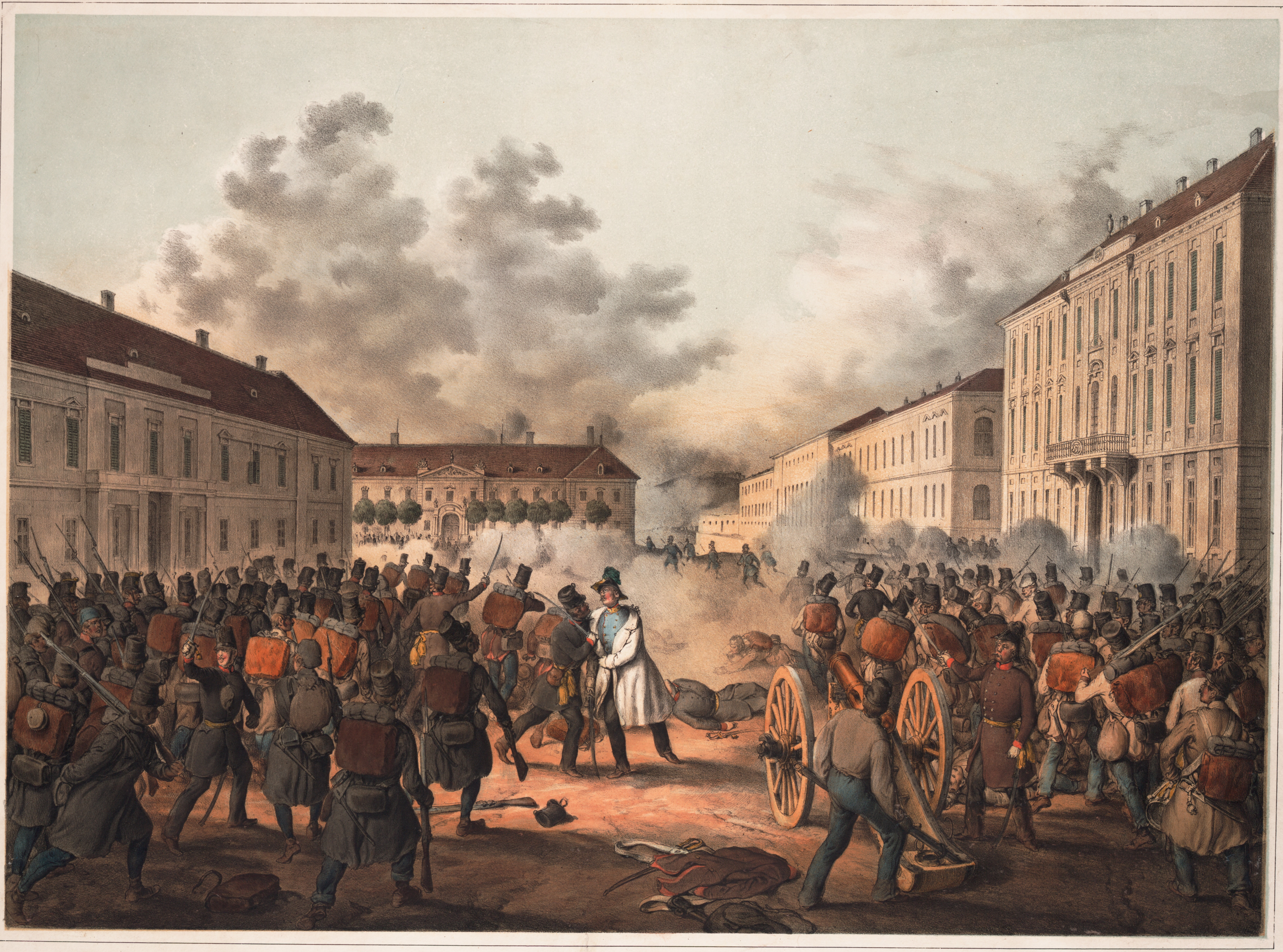
Siege of Buda: The wounding of Gen. Hentzi

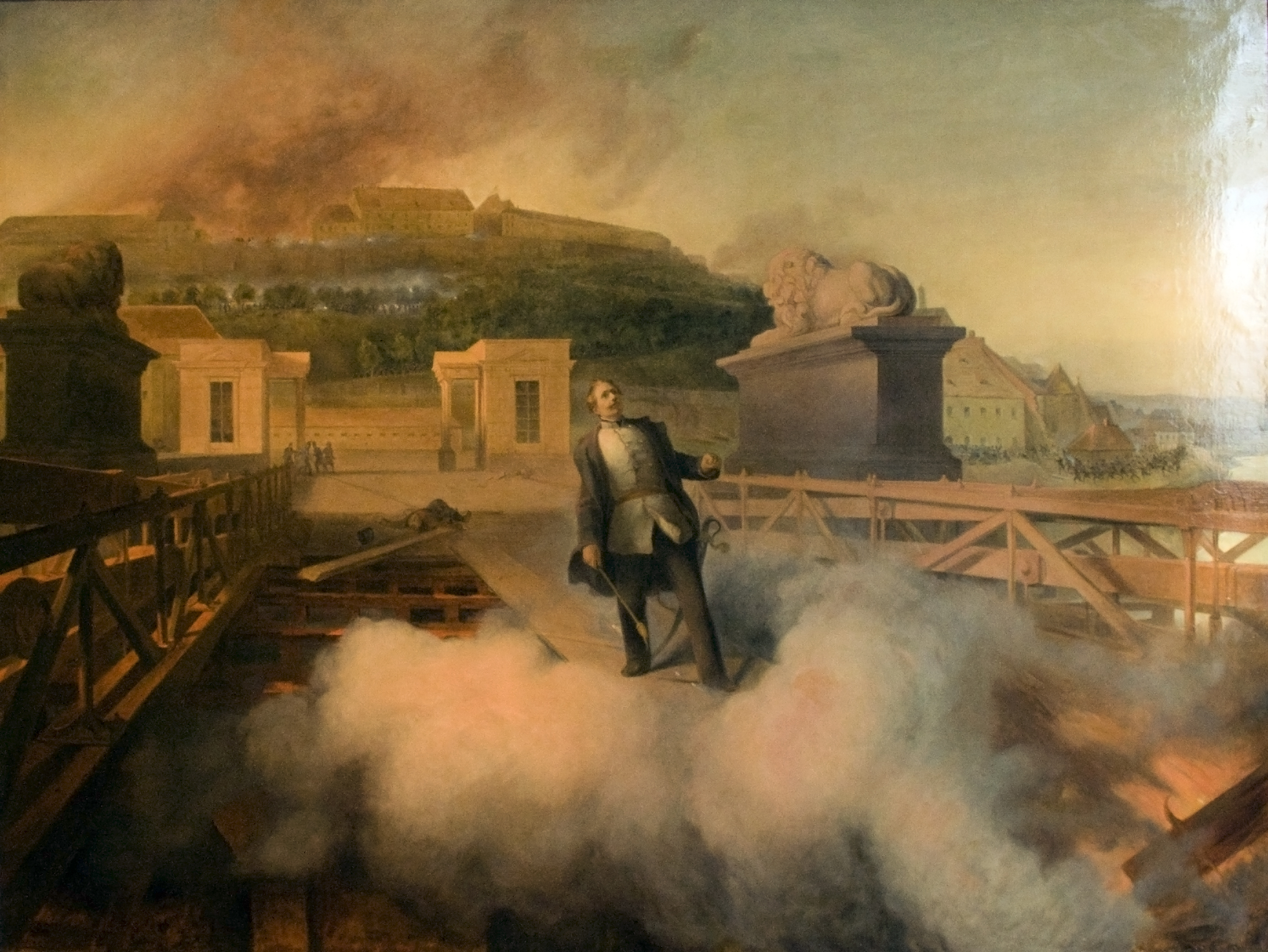
Attempt of blowing up the Chainbridge by Col. Alois Alnoch on 21 May 1849

It was at this critical point that Hentzi, hearing what was happening in Szent György Square, rushed there with two companies of border guards and another two from the Wilhelm regiment, and stood at the head of the defenders trying to repel the Hungarians. He soon received a fatal bullet wound in his stomach, the bullet leaving his body through the back of his chest. Along with Hentzi, Captain Gorini commanding the Wilhelm companies and Captain Schröder were also mortally wounded. The castle commander being disabled effectively meant the castle had fallen to the Hungarian army. The rest of the defenders in Szent György Square, under Lieutenant Kristin, surrendered. However, Hentzi did not die; after being wounded, he was carried to the hospital on Iskola (School) Square, and laid on a bed in the office of chief medical officer Moritz Bartl.

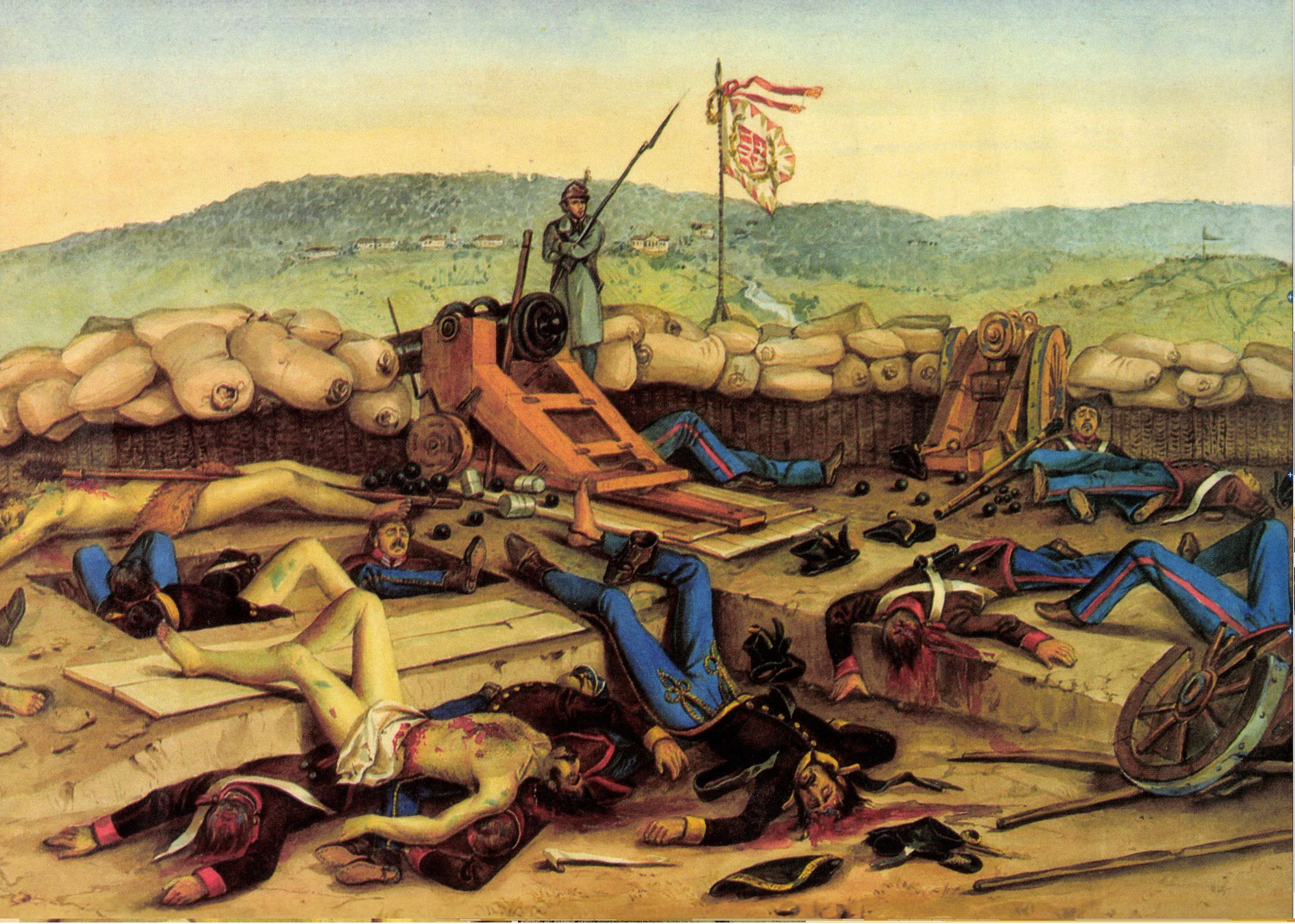
Mór Than – A Hungarian sentinel on the bastion after the liberation of the Castle of Buda

Hentzi had previously ordered the evacuation of the water defences, and the troops from there had been redeployed in the castle. Kmety's troops thus secured the water defenses too. Imperial colonel Alois Alnoch von Edelstadt, in charge of the water defenses, saw that the situation was hopeless. Seeing Szekulics's brigade on the Pest side, and thinking that they were preparing to cross the Chain Bridge towards Buda, he tried to blow up the Chain Bridge by throwing his cigar on the fuse leading to the 4 chests of explosives put there before the siege. However, he succeeded only in blowing himself up, while the bridge suffered only minor damage. In fact, Szekulics had no order or intention to cross the bridge. Alnoch had tried to demolish the Chain Bridge in spite of Görgei's express request to spare "this majestic masterpiece".

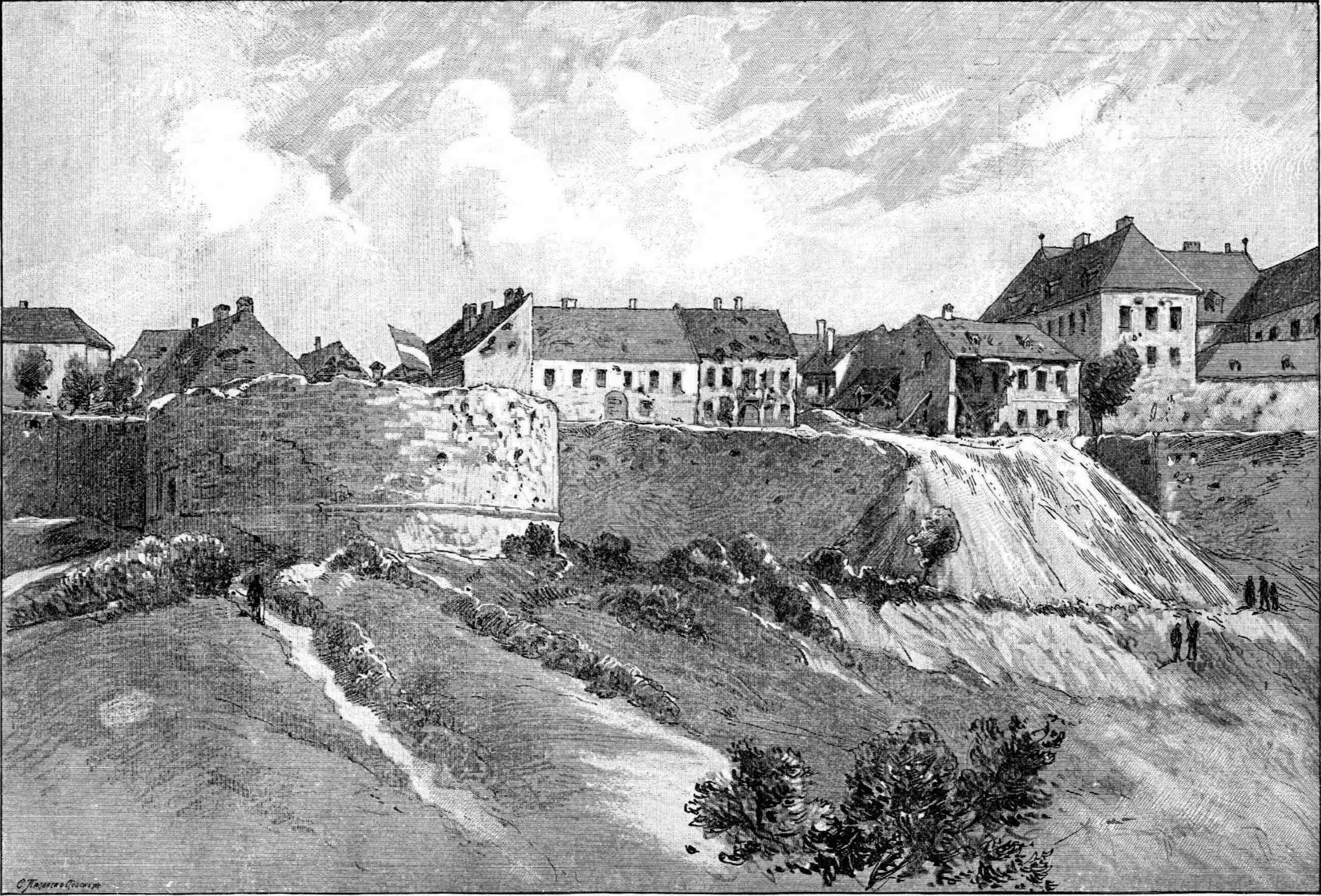
Buda Castle after the Siege

The last imperial troops to surrender were those in the palace. By 7 o'clock the whole Castle of Buda was liberated. Although before the attack Görgei had ordered his soldiers not to take any prisoners because of his anger at the damage caused by the defenders’ cannon to the city of Pest, the Hungarian soldiers mostly spared the lives of the surrendering enemy troops. Even Hentzi, on his death bed, supposedly spoke of the magnanimity of the Hungarian soldiers towards the defenders: "Indeed, the Hungarians are a chivalrous nation".

General Görgei used 19 infantry battalions, 4 jäger companies and sapper units in the final attack. He kept his troops on constant alert against possible attempts by the imperial cavalry to break out of the castle.

According to László Pusztaszeri, the Hungarians lost 1 captain, 4 lieutenants, 15 sergeants, 20 corporals and 630 men, while Róbert Hermann says either 368 dead and 700 wounded of all ranks (József Bayer's report), or 427 dead and 692 wounded (Lajos Asbóth's report).

The imperials lost 30 officers and 680 men, of which 4 officers and 174 men died from the epidemics which broke out in the castle during the siege. 113 officers and 4,091 men surrendered and became prisoners of the Hungarians. Otherwise, they lost 248 cannon of various types, 8,221 projectiles, 931 q (quintal) of gunpowder, 5,383 q saltpetre, 894 q sulfur, 276 horses, and 55,766 cash forints.

As a result of the fighting and of the senseless imperial bombardment of Pest, 40 buildings burned down in Pest and 98 in Buda, while 61 buildings suffered heavy damage in Pest and 537 in Buda. The most affected were the neoclassical buildings on the Lower Danube Row, which were lost forever, and the Royal Palace of Buda.

== Aftermath ==
After the castle was taken, the Hungarian lieutenant János Rónay found the wounded Hentzi in the hospital to which he had been taken and made the Austrian commander prisoner. Chief medical officer Moritz Bartl told the Hungarian officer that Hentzi was mortally wounded and could not be saved. Rónay treated him gently, but when Hentzi asked to shake hands, he refused, saying that he respected him as an excellent general but would not shake his hand because of the bombardment of Pest. Hentzi replied that his guns could have totally destroyed but did not, and that he only fired on those buildings which he had orders to do. As we showed above, Feldzeugmeister Ludwig von Welden's orders to Hentzi contained nothing about destroying Pest; he gave permission only to bombard the city on the eastern bank of the Danube in exceptional situations, if the civilians behaved towards the castle in an unacceptable manner, which they did not.

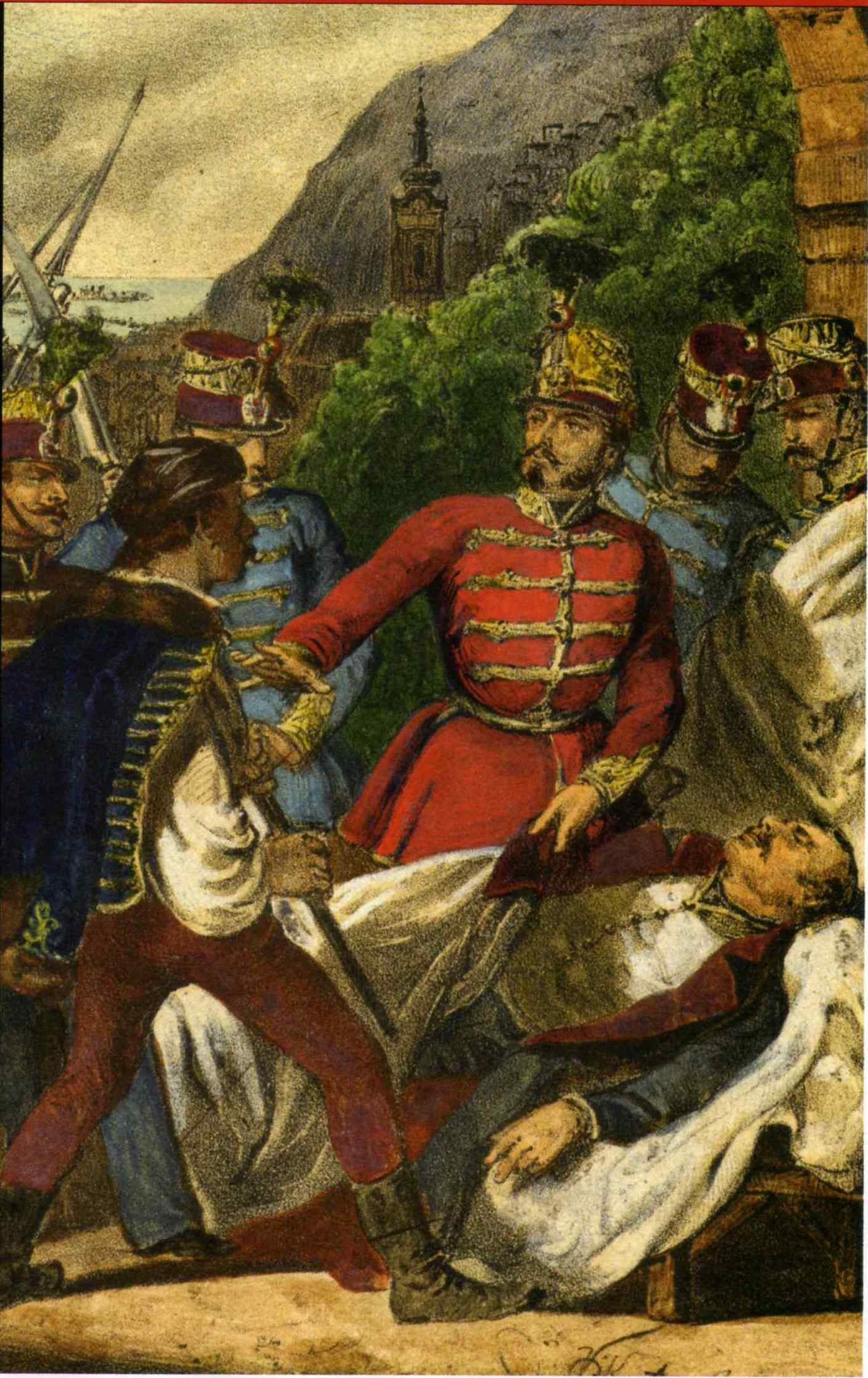
Görgei, in reality Lieutenant János Rónay, defending Hentzi from the angered mob

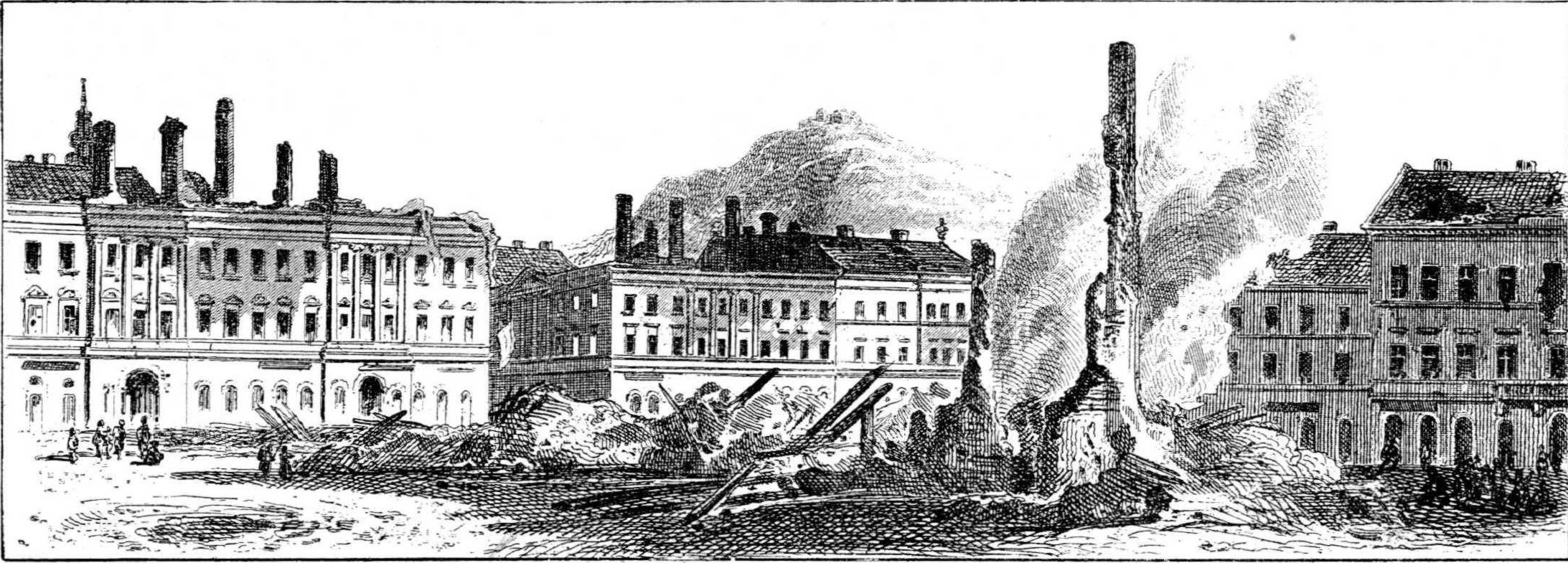
The damages caused by the bombardment of Pest by the imperials: The German Theater

Lieutenant Rónay then transported Hentzi to the Hungarian headquarters, but on the way there, in Dísz Square, the people recognised Hentzi and wanted to hurt him because of what he had done to Pest. Only Lieutenant Rónay's forceful intervention saved the wounded general from being lynched. From this event the legend was born of Artúr Görgei defending Hentzi's dead body from the enraged mob, which was depicted in many contemporary illustrations.

When Hentzi reached the Hungarian headquarters, many Hungarian officers (General József Nagysándor, Colonel Lajos Asbóth, and finally Görgei himself) visited Hentzi and behaved kindly towards him; but when they asked what his wishes were, he replied that he wanted to die. When asked why he wanted this, he replied that he knew that if he recovered, Görgei would hang him, remembering that in his letter demanding the surrender of the castle the Hungarian general had threatened to do so if Hentzi bombarded Pest or blew up the Chain Bridge. Görgei indeed had not forgotten his promise of 4 May, and declared to Lieutenant-Colonel Bódog Bátori Sulcz that he would hang Hentzi the next day if he recovered, saying that the Austrian general did not deserve to be called a hero.

In the evening, Hentzi's condition became critical, and Rónay sent for a priest; but apparently none could be found, perhaps because no priest wanted to give him the extreme unction. Hentzi died at 1 o'clock in the morning on 22 May. His and Colonel Alnoch's bodies were put in two unpainted coffins and sent to the graveyard escorted by a squad of Huszárs to protect the bodies from the people's anger. In 1852, Emperor Franz Joseph I of Austria ordered a monument dedicated to Heinrich Hentzi, which Hungarians objected to because of the senseless damage Hentzi had caused to the capital cities; and in October 1918 it was finally dismantled.

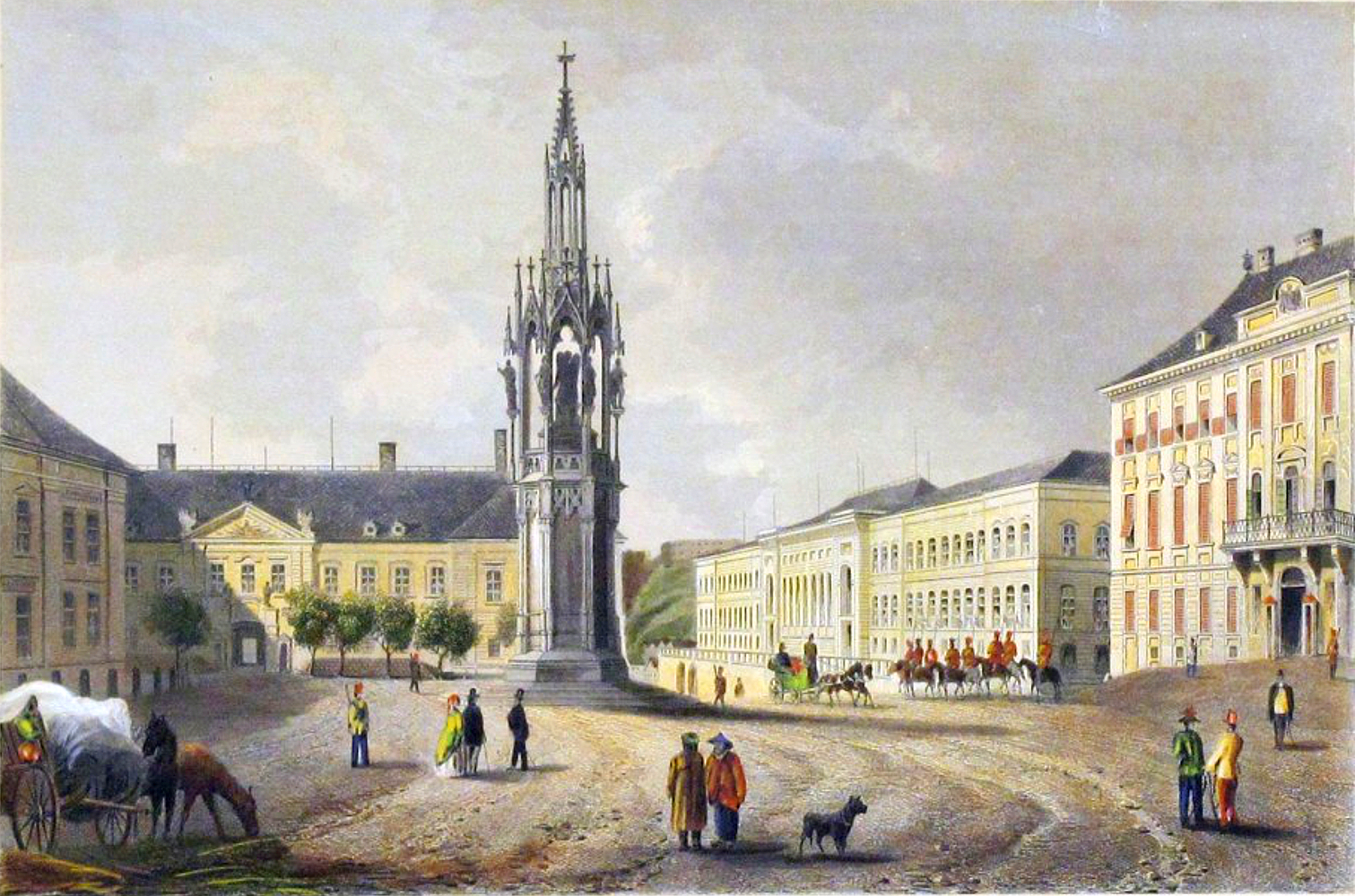
Hentzi Monument Buda

The chivalry of the Hungarian officers was not shared by all of their soldiers. Görgei wrote in his order of the day number 755/v that after the capture of Buda Castle, some Hungarian soldiers had robbed castle residents’ houses, stealing valuable objects from them as well as from the state properties and archives. He therefore ordered all stolen items to be returned within 24 hours, and that those who did not obey this order would be court-martialled.

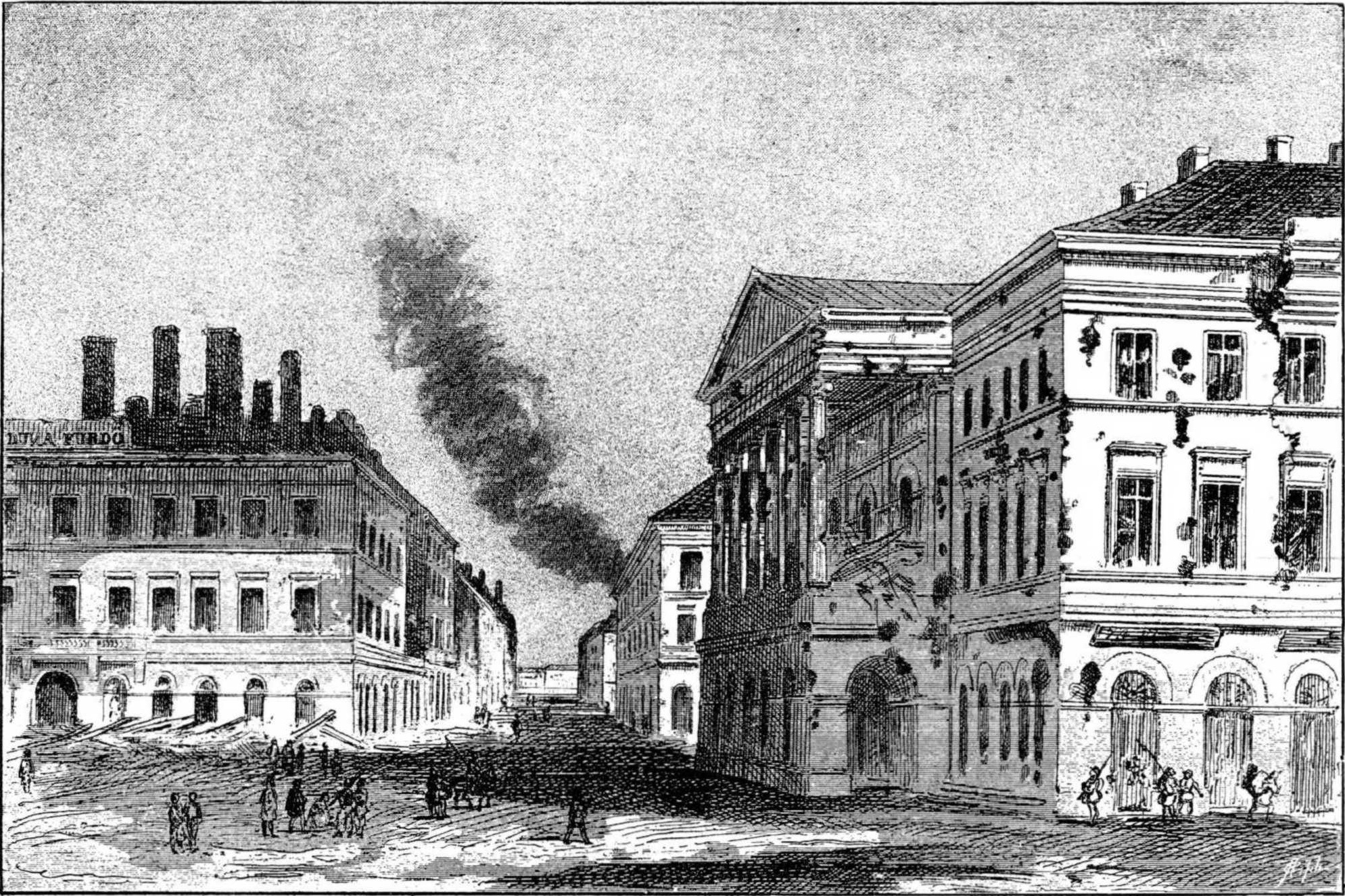
The damages caused by the bombardment of Pest by the imperials: Lloyd-building

Although General Mór Perczel accused Artúr Görgei of intentionally delaying the occupation of the Buda Castle to give the Austrian troops from around Vienna and Pozsony time to recover, because Perczel wanted to persuade the Hungarian government in Debrecen to bring Görgei before a court-martial, the liberation of the castle prompted rejoicing among the Hungarians, who convinced Prime Minister Bertalan Szemere to award Görgei the First Class Military Order of Merit and the rank of lieutenant general. But when he was visited by a Government delegation to invest him with the order and his promotion, Görgei refused. He said that he did not deserve these and did not approve of the greed of many soldiers and officers for rank and decorations, which was not compatible with Prime Minister Szemere's Republican political program, and that by refusing these distinctions he wanted to set an example for his subordinates. The leaders of the delegation, Senator Zsigmond Bernáth and Deputy Gábor Kazinczy saluted Görgei's decision.

In his meeting with the two politicians, Görgei told them that after the capture of Buda he was planning to stage a coup d'état, to use his army to force the retraction of the Declaration of the Hungarian Independence, as he thought that this political act by the Hungarian Parliament made any kind of compromise with the emperor and the imperial Government in Vienna impossible, and because he thought that as the threat of Russian intervention became more and more clear, the only hope for Hungary to save at least part of its autonomy and the achievements of the Hungarian revolution of 15 March 1848 was an agreement with the emperor. But when Bernáth and Kazinczy told him they shared his views and that there was a party in the Hungarian parliament called the Peace Party (Békepárt) which wanted to reach an agreement with Emperor Franz Joseph I., he renounced his planned coup, and declared that he hoped for a political, "constitutional" solution to the problem.

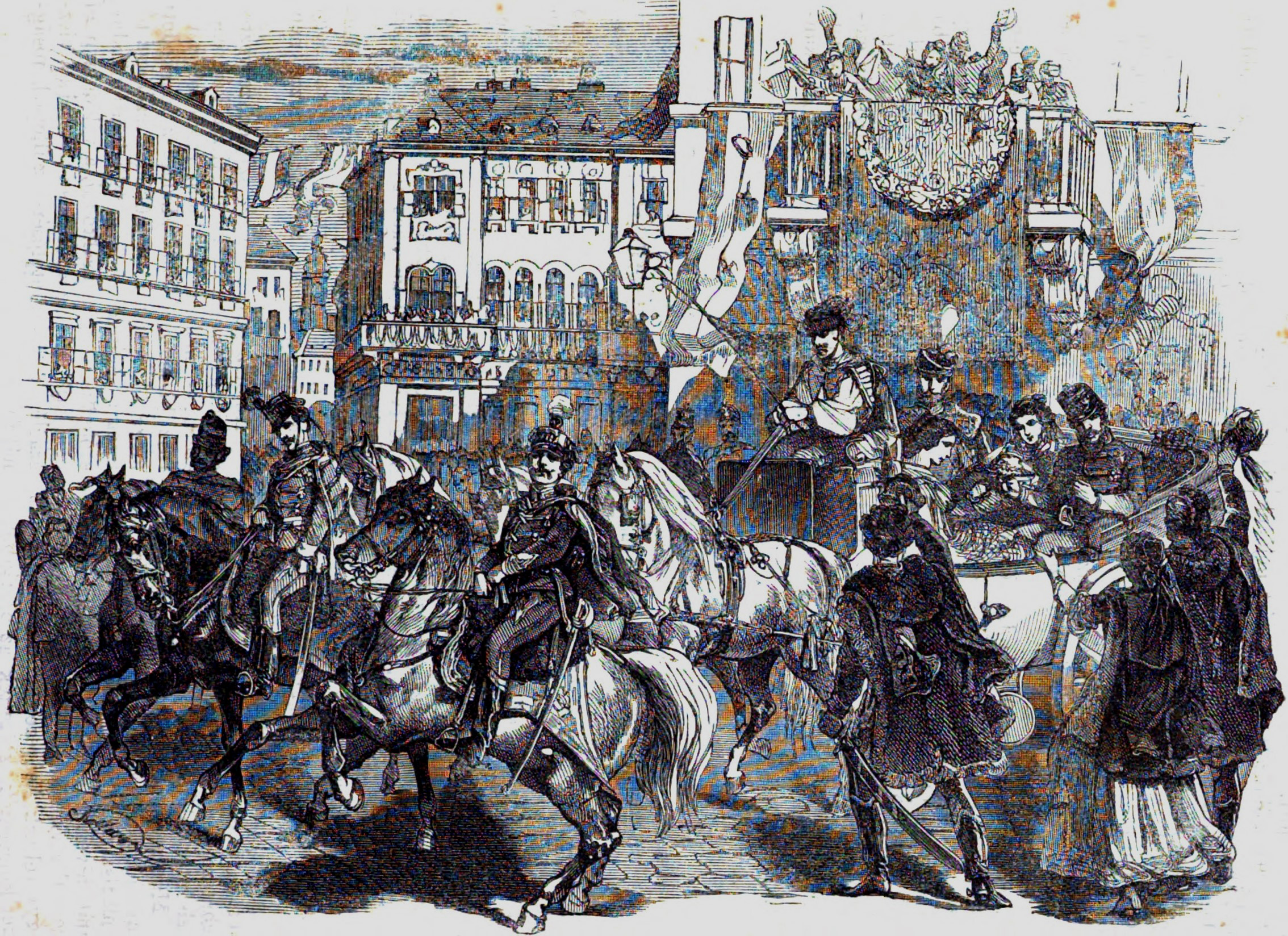
Kossuth and his family being welcomed by the population in the liberated Buda and Pest

After receiving the news of the capture of Buda on 22 May, Governor Lajos Kossuth and Prime Minister Bertalan Szemere published Görgei's report of the victory with a postscript, in which they wrote: "You have crowned the campaign you have conducted so far with the capture of the ancient Castle of Buda. You have given the Motherland its capital back, and the National Assembly and the Government their seat. Furthermore, through this victory, you have urged or rather made possible, that our national independence be recognised by Europe." On 23 May, Kázmér Batthyány, the Minister of Foreign Affairs of Hungary, wrote a letter to Ferenc Pulszky, the Szemere government's emissary to London, that after the liberation of Buda he was sure that the European nations, who hitherto had been reluctant to accept Hungary's declaration of independence as a fait accompli, would open diplomatic relations with Hungary. Thus, the Hungarian politicians believed that the conquest of Buda would prevent Russia from intervening in the conflict between Hungary and the Austrian Empire, because the European powers would accept Hungary as an independent state. Later events showed that these hopes were groundless, and the European nations looked away when 200,000 Russian soldiers crossed the Hungarian border in June to crush Hungarian independence.

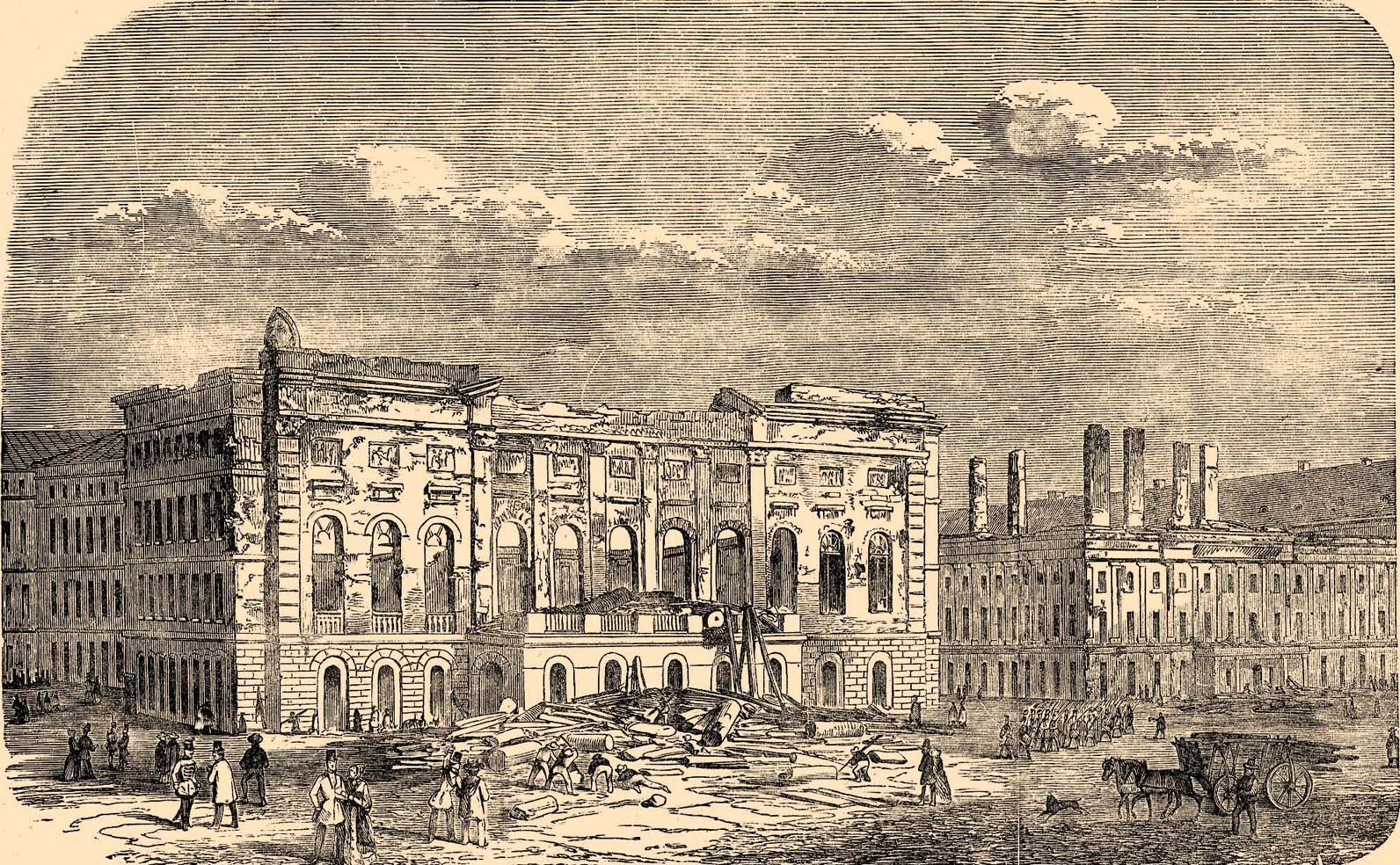
The damages caused by the bombardment of Pest by the imperials: the Vigadó

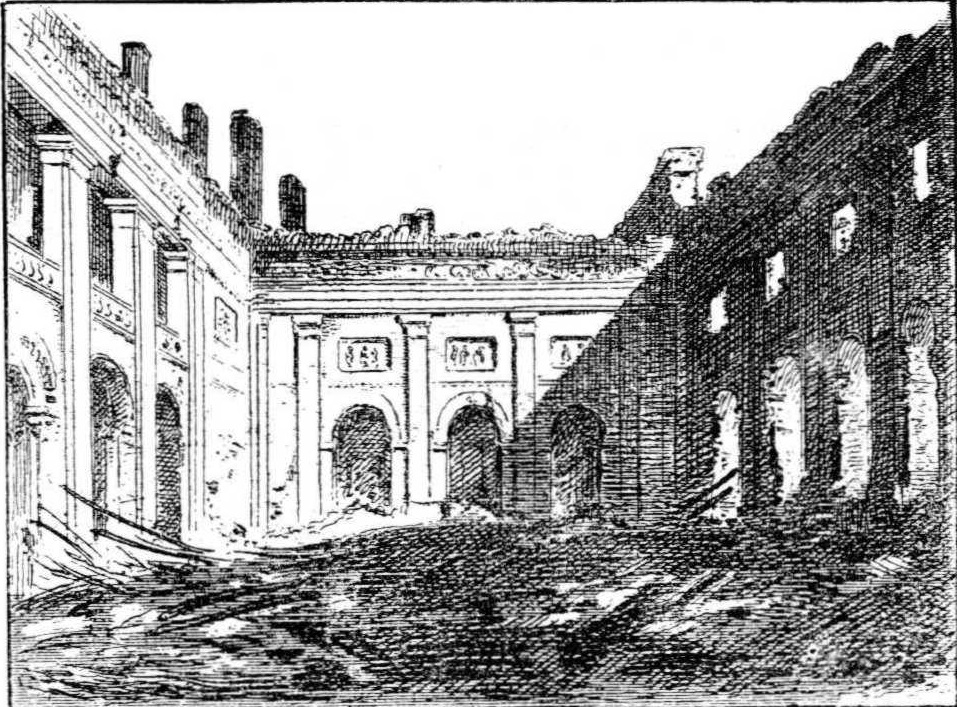
The damages caused by the bombardment of Pest by the imperials: the House of Representatives

However, the mood of April and May 1849, during the Hungarian Revolutionary Army's victorious Spring Campaign, led the imperial commanders and politicians to fear a Hungarian attack against Vienna and to feel that they could not repulse such an attack without Russian intervention. Imperial reports show a constant concern, lasting several weeks, regarding a possible Hungarian attack against Austria that would be helped by revolutionary forces in Vienna and the Austrian provinces. For example, a letter from Prince Felix of Schwarzenberg, Minister-President of the Austrian Empire, shows that the people of Vienna were again in revolutionary mood. When Field Marshal Alfred I, Prince of Windisch-Grätz, the former high commander of the imperial forces in Hungary returned to Prague, after being dismissed because of his defeats on the Hungarian front, the people gathered in front of him and shouted: "Long live Kossuth!" This constant fear on the part the imperial commanders and politicians also shows the talent of General Ernő Poeltenberg commanding the 12,000 men of Hungarian VII. Corps, whose demonstrations not only kept at bay far more imperial troops (over 50,000, in fact), but also made them believe his force was capable of a successful advance into the Austrian Hereditary Provinces. Feldzeugmeister Ludwig von Welden, high commander of the imperial forces in Hungary, wrote to Schwarzenberg urging Russian intervention, saying the revolutions in Italy and Germany could reignite if Hungarian military successes continued, and that the Hungarian Revolution would not be suppressed quickly. On 1 May, Schwarzenberg wrote that the first 85,000 Russian troops had already entered the Austrian province of Galicia and taken position near the Hungarian border, awaiting further orders. But, as shown above (Towards Vienna or to Buda?), before and during the siege of Buda the Hungarian army was actually so numerically inferior compared to the imperial forces gathered around Pozsony and Vienna that the Habsburg commanders' fears were groundless.

The storming of Buda castle was the zenith of the Honvéd army's glory. It was not a simple victory, but one of the greatest Hungarian victories in the Independence War of 1848–1849, causing the loss of 5,000 elite soldiers of the Austrian Empire, and gaining a huge booty in artillery, muskets, ammunition, horses, etc., which were used in the following months in the struggle against the combined forces of two empires: the Habsburg and the Russian. They were indeed soon to be necessary, because Welden was preparing for another attack when he heard of the fall of Buda, whereupon he abandoned his plans. In terms of the number of the prisoners and spoils, this victory was surpassed only by the Victory of Ozora, on 7 October 1848, in which 7,553 enemy soldiers were forced to capitulate to Görgei; but those troops were among the least fit in the Habsburg army, while those commanded by Hentzi were among its best. It was now clear that Austria alone would be unable to put down the Hungarian struggle for independence. It is telling that the very day Buda was captured, Francis Joseph I finalised an agreement by which Tsar Nicholas I of Russia would send 200,000 soldiers to crush the Hungarian Revolution. The Emperor marked his gratitude for this friendly assistance by kissing the hand of the Tsar.

The Capture of Buda is regarded as the conclusion of the Hungarian army's victorious Spring Campaign, which resulted in the liberation of almost all Hungary from the Habsburg troops and their Russian, Serbian, Croatian, and Romanian allies. After this, the Summer Campaign saw the intervention in June of a quarter of the troops of the Russian Empire, together with the reorganized and numerically superior Habsburg army. In the face of these, the numerically and technologically desperately inferior Hungarian army, despite its admirable bearing which earned the respect of the enemy commanders, could only put up a heroic but hopeless resistance before it was defeated and forced to lay down its arms at Nagyszőlős on 13 August 1849 and at Komárom on 2 October 1849.

== Legacy ==
The famous Hungarian Romantic novelist Mór Jókai made the Hungarian Revolution and Independence War the subject of his popular novel A kőszívű ember fiai (literally: The Stone-hearted Man's Sons, translated into English under the title The Baron's Sons). In chapter XXIII, the Siege of Buda is vividly presented as one of the main plot points of the novel, in which several of his main characters appear fighting in the ranks of both the Hungarian and the Austrian armies. In 1965, this novel was also adapted as a movie of the same title (A kőszívű ember fiai), which included the Siege of Buda as one of its most important scenes.

Since 1992, the Hungarian Government has been celebrating the day of the capture of the Castle of Buda, 21 May, as National Defence Day (Hungarian: a honvédség napja).

== Sources ==
- Aggházy, Kamil (2001), Budavár bevétele 1849-ben I-II ("The capture of the Castle of Buda in 1849") (in Hungarian), Budapest: Budapest Főváros Levéltára, ISBN 963-7323-27-9
- Bánlaky, József (2001). A magyar nemzet hadtörténelme ("The Military History of the Hungarian Nation) (in Hungarian). Budapest: Arcanum Adatbázis.
- Bóna, Gábor (1987). Tábornokok és törzstisztek a szabadságharcban 1848–49 ("Generals and Staff Officers in the War of Freedom 1848–1849") (in Hungarian). Budapest: Zrínyi Katonai Kiadó. p. 430. ISBN 963-326-343-3.
- Hermann, Róbert (2001), 1848-1849 a szabadságharc hadtörténete ("Military History of 1848-1849") (in Hungarian), Budapest: Korona, ISBN 963-9376-21-3
- Hermann, Róbert (2004). Az 1848–1849-es szabadságharc nagy csatái ("Great battles of the Hungarian Revolution of 1848-1849") (in Hungarian). Budapest: Zrínyi. p. 408. ISBN 963-327-367-6.
- Hermann, Róbert (1996). Az 1848–1849 évi forradalom és szabadságharc története ("The history of the Hungarian Revolution and War of Independence of 1848–1849) (in Hungarian). Budapest: Videopont. p. 464. ISBN 963-8218-20-7.
- Hermann, Róbert. "Buda bevétele, 1849. május 21" (in Hungarian). Archived from the original on 16 February 2009.
- Hermann, Róbert (February 2013), "Heinrich Hentzi, a budavári Leonidász" (PDF), Aetas
- "Buda visszavívása". Múlt-kor történelmi portál (in Hungarian). 20 May 2004.
- "Várharcok az 1848-49-es szabadságharcban" (in Hungarian). Archived from the original on 6 October 2008.
- "Buda bevétele, 1849. május 21". Archived from the original on 13 March 2005.
- Jókai, Maurus (1900). The Baron's Sons. London: The Walter Scott Publishing CO. LD. p. 378.
- Kapronczay, Károly (1998). "A szabadságharc egészségügye". Valóság ("Reality") (in Hungarian) (3): 15–23. Archived from the original on 18 January 2005.
- Zakar, Péter (1999). A magyar hadsereg tábori lelkészei 1848-49-ben (in Hungarian). Budapest: METEM könyvek. Archived from the original on 12 January 2019.
- Pusztaszeri, László (1984). Görgey Artúr a szabadságharcban ("Artúr Görgey in the War of Independence") (in Hungarian). Budapest: Magvető Könyvkiadó. p. 784. ISBN 963-14-0194-4.
