= List of sights and historic places in Budapest =

== Panoramic view points ==
- Naphegy panoramic view to Gellért Hill, best near view to south side of Buda Castle, historic district Krisztinaváros
- The Fisherman's Bastion panoramic view across the Danube to Pest, in the heart of the Castle District.
- Tabán historic site, near panoramic view to Buda Castle, Danube Promenade, Erzsébet Bridge, park and 1956 Hungarian Revolution Memorial
- Gellért Hill best far view to the Danube Bridges, Danube Promenade and Gellért Baths
- Danube Promenade view to Buda Castle, Gellért Hill
- Sashegy impressive, far view from the top of the Natural Reserve Park to: Gellérthegy, Naphegy, Buda Castle, Danube Promenade. Bus No. 8 to LEJTŐ ÚT and 10 minutes to the end of the Tájék utca.
- Széchenyi-hegy, far view from the end of the bus-line 112 to: Gellérthegy, Naphegy, Sashegy, Buda Castle, Danube Promenade. Bus No. 112 (view point: Thomán István utca / Tamási Áron lépcső).

== Palaces and historic buildings ==
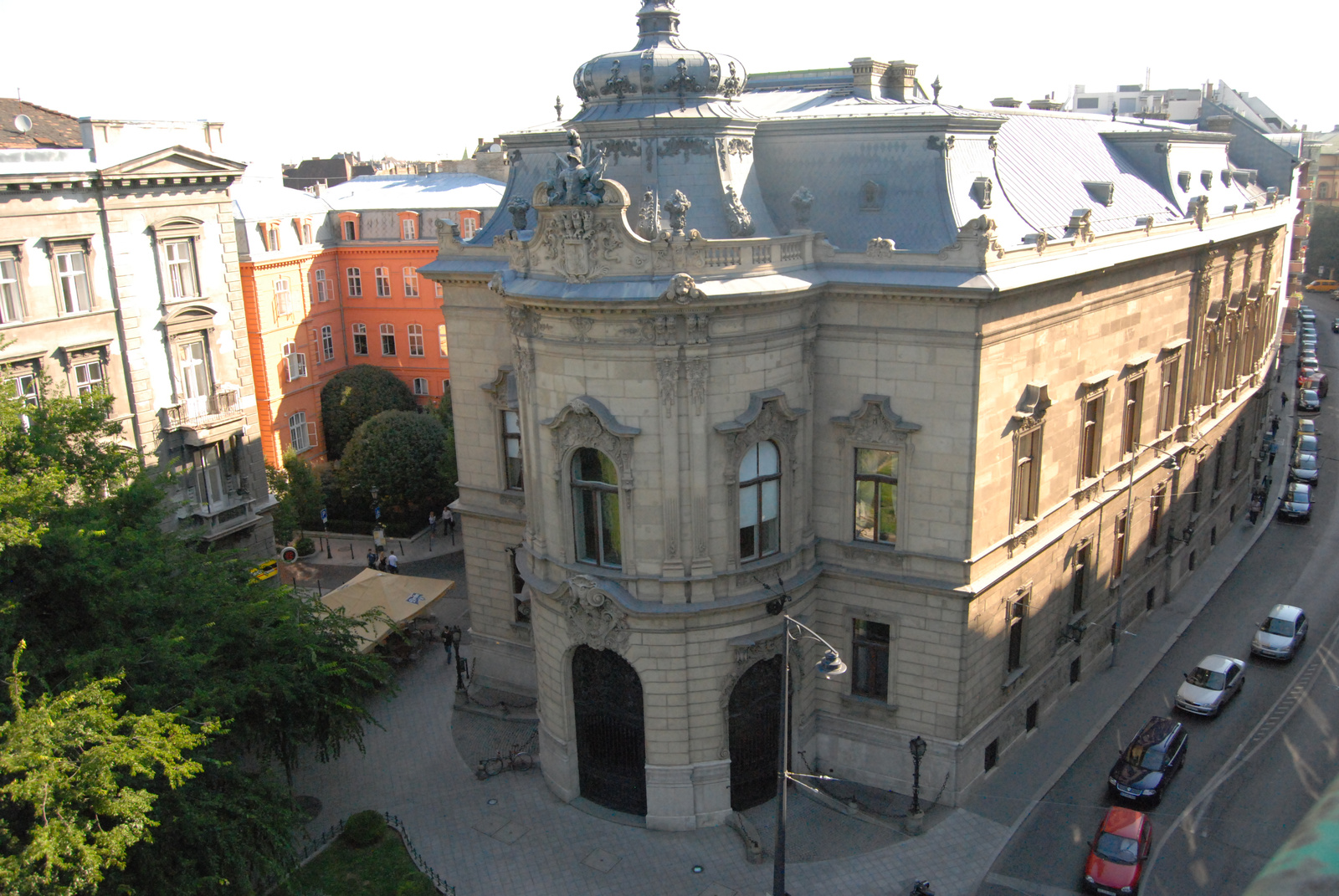
Ervin Szabó Library

- Houses on Vienna Gate Square, this charming row of four houses was built in the late 18th and early 19th centuries on the ruins of medieval dwellings near the Vienna Gate Square. The houses are adorned with decorative motifs in the Baroque, Rococo and Neo-Classical styles.
- Sándor Palace, the original friezes that decorated this 19th-century palace were recreated by Hungarian artists as part of its restoration. The palace is now the headquarters of the President of the Republic of Hungary.
- Várkert Casino, this Neo-Renaissance pavilion was built by Miklós Ybl as a pump house for the Buda Castle. It now houses the luxurious Várkert Casino.
- Péterffy Palace, this place, commemorating a flood of 1838, was placed on one of the few Baroque mansions the remain in Pest. The house was built in 1756.
- Ervin Szabó Library, the grand, Neo-Baroque palace the now houses this library was originally built in 1887 for the Wenckheims, a family of rich industrialists.
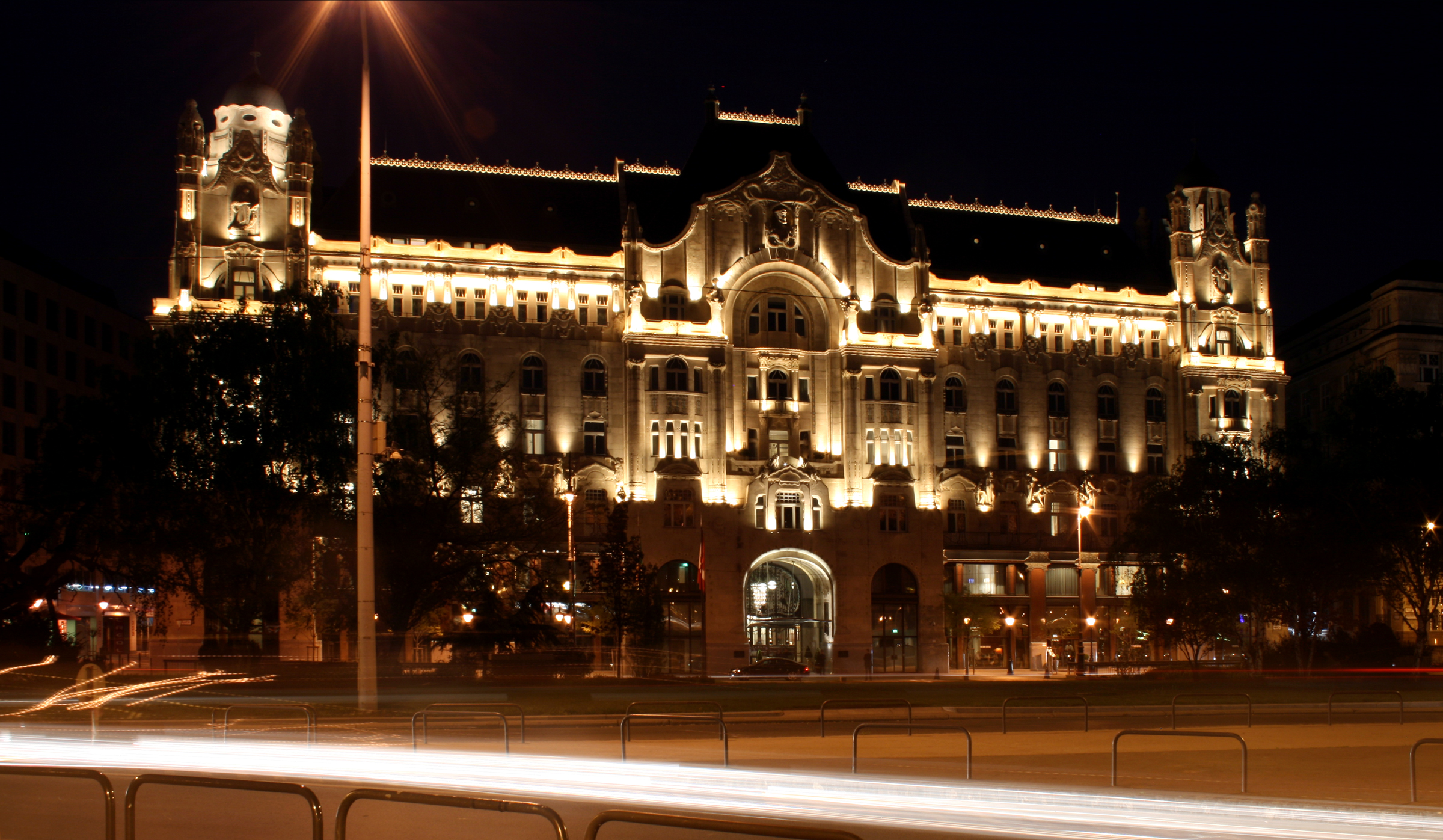
  Gresham Palace
- Pallavicini Palace, Gustáv Petschacher built this Neo-Renaissance mansion on Kodály körönd in 1882. The inner courtyard was copied from the Palazzo Marini in Milan.
- Danube Palace, this Neo-Baroque building was built between 1894 and 1897, construction was base on plans of Vilmos Freund and Géza Márkus.
- Gresham Palace, Now housing a Four Seasons Hotel, this splendid example of Secession design was built in 1905-07 by Zsigmond Quittner.
- Hungarian Academy of Science, the facade of the academy is adorned with statues by Emil Wolff and Miklós Izsó, symbolizing major fields of knowledge: law natural history, mathematics, philosophy, linguistics and history.
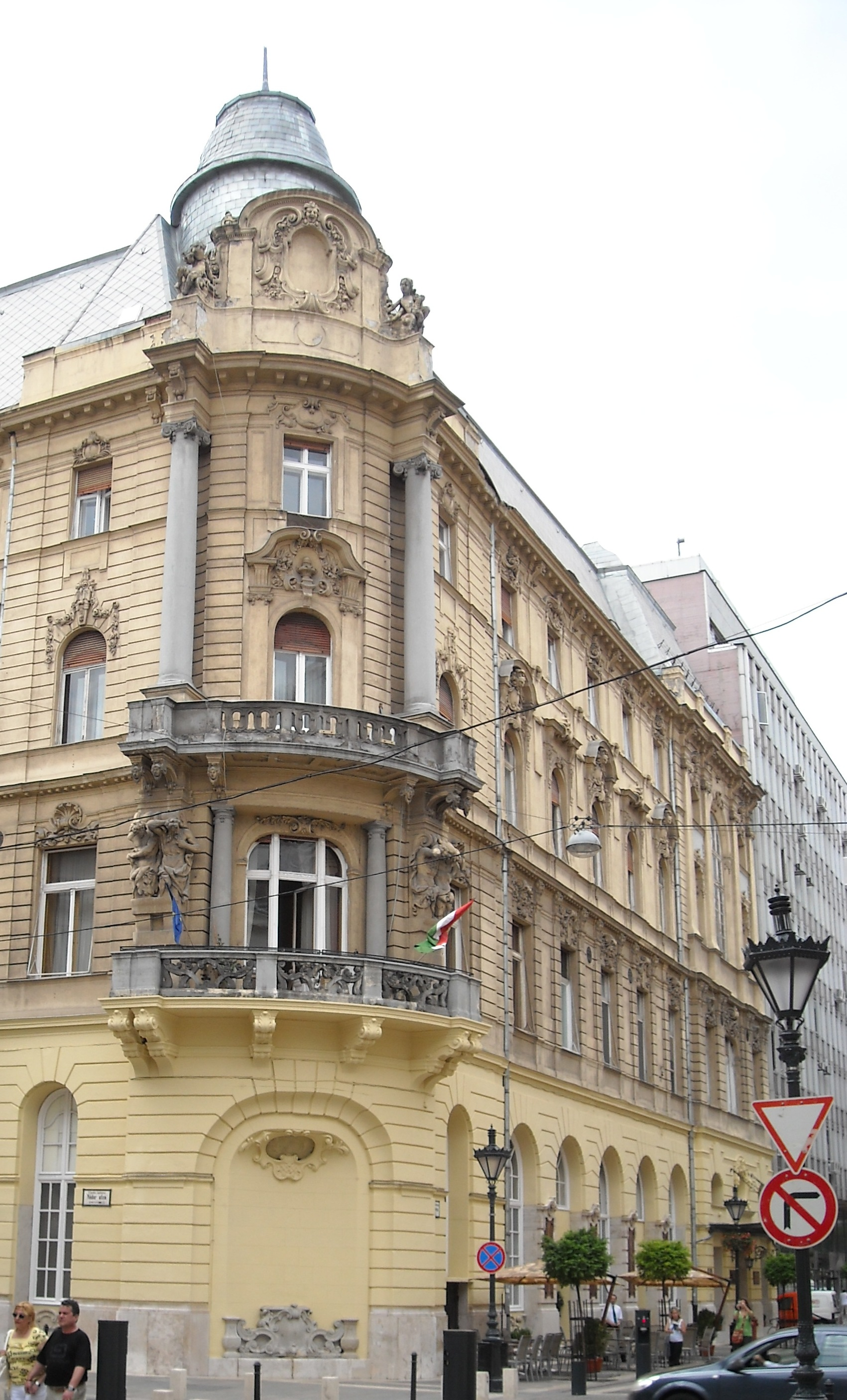
  Danube Palace
- Buda Castle, this palace was a turbulent history dating back to the 13th century. Its present form, however, reflects the opulence of the 19th century. Today the palace houses some of the city's finest museums.

== Sights and historic places ==
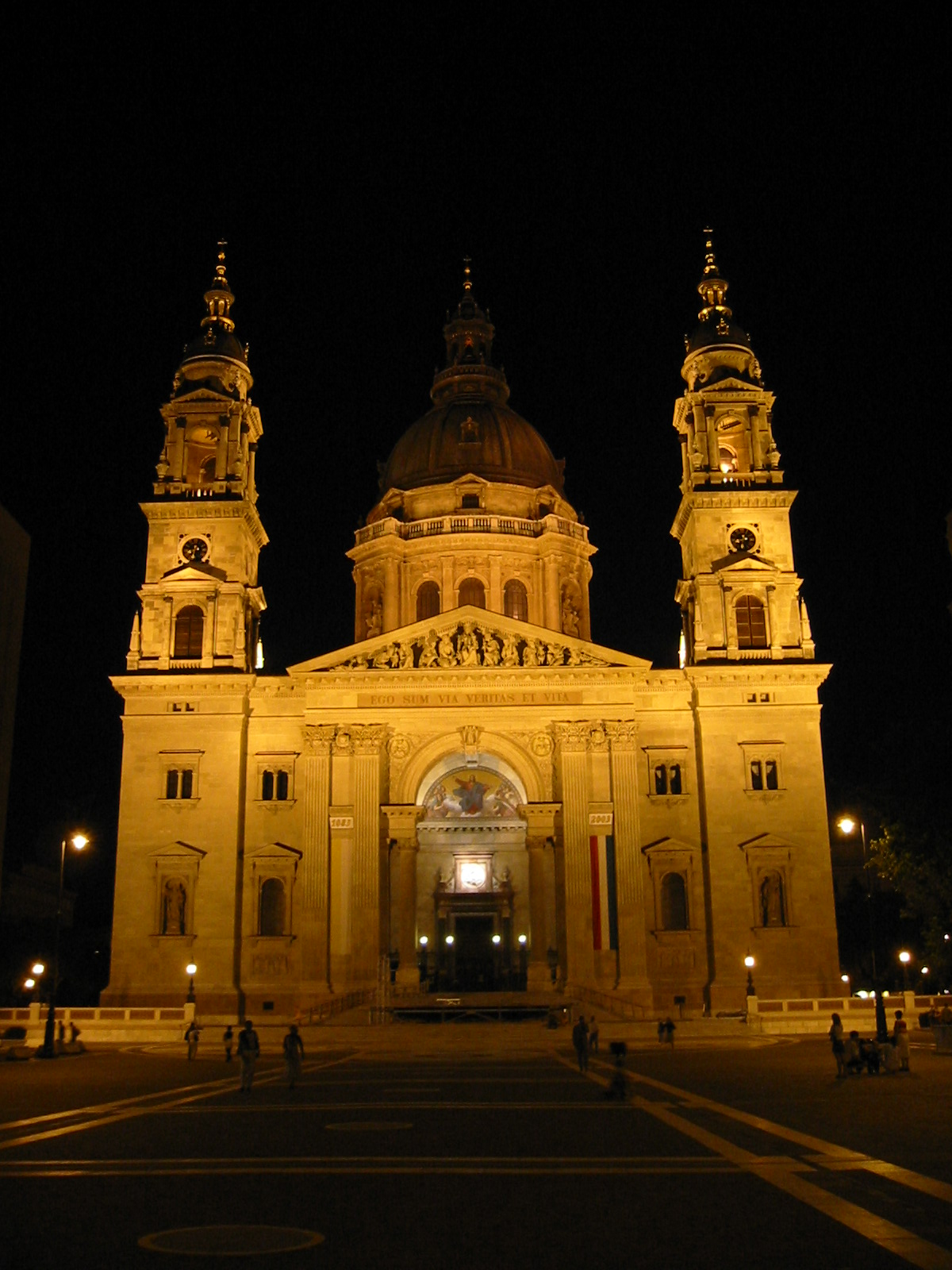
Szt. István Bazilika

(The below sights are grouped by location.)

- Andrássy Avenue with its several sights including the Hungarian State Opera House, the Pest Broadway and the House of Terror
- Zelnik Istvan Southeast Asian Gold Museum on Andrássy Avenue in the Rauch villa
- Bauhaus in Budapest: walk in Napraforgó Street, row of 22 Bauhaus villas, Pasarét and Újlipótváros
- Buda Castle with the Royal Palace, the Funicular, Hungarian National Gallery and National Széchényi Library, Matthias Church, Holy Trinity Column (a plague column) and Fisherman's Bastion
- City Park with Széchenyi Medicinal Bath, Vajdahunyad Castle, the Timewheel, the Zoo, the Municipal Grand Circus and the Amusement Park
- Danube Promenade or Dunakorzó with Vigadó Concert Hall
- Ferenciek tere with Paris Courtyard and Erzsébet Bridge with Inner City Parish Church nearby
- Franz Liszt Academy of Music
- Gellért Baths, Gellért Hill with Gellért Statue, Cave Church and Citadel with Liberty Statue
- Geological Museum
- Great Market Hall and Liberty Bridge
- Heroes' Square with the Millenary Monument, the Palace of Art and the Museum of Fine Arts
- Margaret Island with the Centennial Memorial, a Japanese garden, a Musical Fountain, several recreation facilities and Franciscan, Dominican and Premonstratensian ruins from the Middle Ages
- Museum of Applied Arts
- National Museum
- Szabadság tér One of the most beautiful squares in downtown Budapest
- Corvin tér Beautifully restored square at the foot of Castle Hill
- Dohány Street Synagogue, the largest synagogue in Europe with the Holocaust Memorial (weeping willow statue)
- New York Café
- Óbuda
- Palace of Arts and National Theatre
- Parliament Building with the Holy Crown of Hungary and sceptre, Kossuth Memorial, Ethnographical Museum, Attila József statue, Imre Nagy statue
- Saint Stephen's Basilica
- Sashegy The largest Natural Reserve Park of Budapest
- Shoes on the Danube Promenade Gyula Pauer - Holocaust Memorial
- Statue Park
- Széchenyi Chain Bridge, Academy of Sciences and Gresham Palace
- Tomb of Gül Baba
- Váci utca and Vörösmarty Square
- Western Railway Station
- Erzsébetváros District VII, the former Jewish quarter
