= Timeline of Budapest =

The following is a timeline of the history of the city of Budapest, Hungary.

== Before 16th century ==
- BCE. - Neolithic, Chalcolithic-, Bronze and Iron Age cultures, Celtic and Eravisci settlements on present day Budapest.
- 1st C. CE - Romans found the settlements known as Aquincum, Contra-Aquincum and Campona. Aquincum becomes the largest town of the Danubian region and one of the capitals of Pannonia.
- 376 CE - Aquincum invaded by the Huns.
- 5th C. - The Age of Huns. King Attila builds a city for himself here according to later chronicles. After his death, the sons of his brother controlled the united Hun tribes.
- 896 - Following the foundation of Hungary, Árpád, leader of the Hungarians, settles in the "Town of Attila", usually identified as Aquincum.
- 10th C. - Out of the seven to ten Hungarian tribes, four have settlements in the territory of modern Budapest: Megyer, Keszi, Jenő and Nyék.
- end of 10th C. - Magyars came into the country and preserved the names of Buda and Pest.
- 1015 - Matthias Church established (approximate date).
- 1046 - Bishop Gerard of Csanád dies at the hands of pagans on present-day Gellért Hill.
- 1241 - Mongol invasion destroys both towns.
- 1244 - Created a royal free city by Bela IV.
- 1248 - King Béla IV builds the first royal castle on Castle Hill, Buda. The new town adopts the name of Buda from the earlier one (present day Óbuda). Pest is surrounded by city walls.
- 1255 - Matthias Church reconstruction begins.
- 1265 - Buda Castle first completed.
- 1270 - Saint Margaret of Hungary dies in a cloister on the Isle of Rabbits (present day Margaret Island).
- 1320 - Royal wedding of King Charles I of Hungary and Princess Elizabeth of Poland, Hungarian–Polish alliance formed.
- 1361 - Buda became the capital of Hungary.
- 1458 - The noblemen of Hungary elect Matthias Corvinus (in Latin) or Hunyadi Mátyás (in Hungarian) as king on the ice of the Danube. Under his reign Buda becomes a main hub of European Renaissance. He dies in 1490, after capturing Vienna in 1485.
- 1472 - Printing press established in Buda.

== 16th to 18th centuries ==
- 1526 - 26 November: Buda taken by forces of Ottman Suleyman.
- 1530 - Siege of Buda (1530).
- 1540 - Siege of Buda (1540).
- 1541
  - Siege of Buda (1541).
  - Buda becomes part of the Ottoman Empire. The Turkish Pashas build multiple mosques and baths in Buda.
  - Budin Eyalet established.
- 1542 - Siege of Pest.
- 1550 - Rudas Baths built.
- 1566 - Sokollu Mustafa Pasha becomes Pasha of Buda.

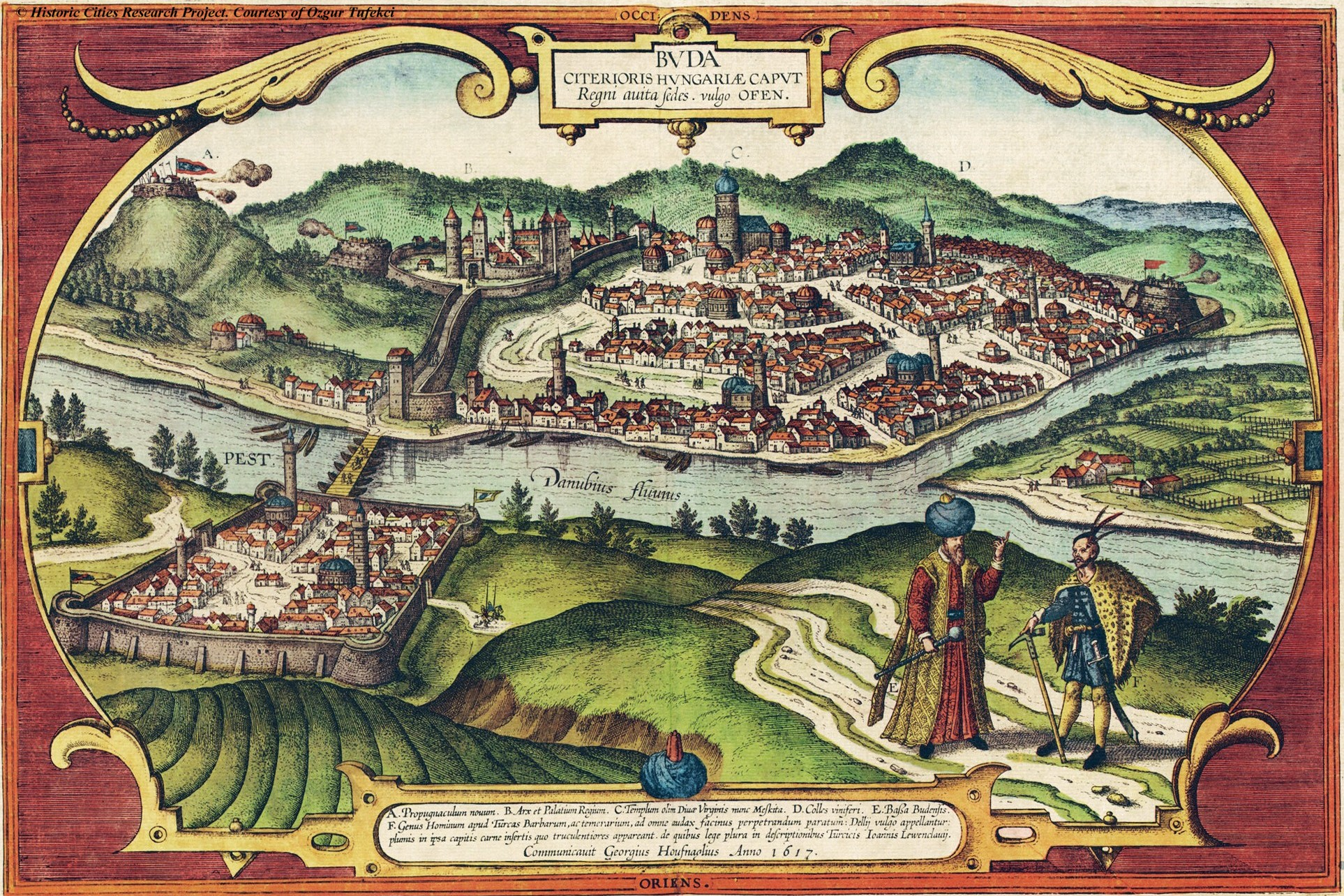
Buda and Pest in the early 17th century

- 1602 - An unsuccessful assault on Budapest under Field Marshal Hermann Christof von Russwurm (2 October - 15 November 1602).
- 1686 - Battle of Buda (1686). Buda and Pest are reconquered from the Turks with Habsburg leadership. Both towns are destroyed completely in the battles.
- 1690s - Resettlement, initially only a few hundred German settlers.
- 1699 - By the Treaty of Karlowitz the emperor of Austria undertook to preserve a small octagonal Turkish mosque beneath which is the grave of a Turkish monk.
- 1723 - Pest became the seat of the highest Hungarian officials.
- 1769 - Buda Castle reconstruction completed.
- 1771 - Citadel built in Buda.
- 1773 - Election of the first Mayor of Pest.
- 1777 - Maria Theresa of Austria moves Nagyszombat University to Castle Hill in Buda.
- 1783 - Joseph II places the acting government (Helytartótanács) and Magyar Kamara on Buda.
- 1795 - 20 May - Ignác Martinovics and other Jacobin leaders are executed on Vérmező or 'The Field of Blood'.
- 1799 - Combined population: 54,179.

== 19th century ==
- 1810 - A fire in the Tabán district.
- 1811 - City Park laid out in Pest.
- 1823 - Fasori Gimnázium (school) founded.
- 1825 - Commencement of the Reform Era. Pest becomes the cultural and economic centre of the country. The first National Theatre is built, along with the Hungarian National Museum.
- 1830 - Steamboat to Vienna begins operating.
- 1833 - Vigadó Concert Hall opens in Pest.
- 1836 - Pest-Buda Musical Association founded.
- 1838 - 1838 Pest flood. The biggest flood in recent memory in March completely inundates Pest.
- 1839 - Industrial flour mill begins operating.
- 1844 - Ganz Works iron foundry in business in Buda.
- 1846 - Vác-Budapest railway begins operating.
- 1848 - 15 March - Start of the Revolution and War of Independence of 1848-49. Pest replaces Pozsony/Pressburg (Bratislava) as the new capital of Hungary and seat of the Batthyány government and the Parliament.
- 1849
  - 5 January: Austrians occupy the city.
  - April: Hungarian Honvédsereg (Army of National Defense) reclaims city, taking the fortress of Buda on May 21 after an 18-day Battle of Buda (1849).
  - July: Habsburg army again captures the two towns.
  - 6 October - Lajos Batthyány, the first Hungarian Prime Minister is executed on the present-day Szabadság tér.
  - Széchenyi Lánchíd, or Széchenyi Chain Bridge, the first permanent bridge across the Danube in Budapest was opened linking Buda (West bank) and Pest (East bank).

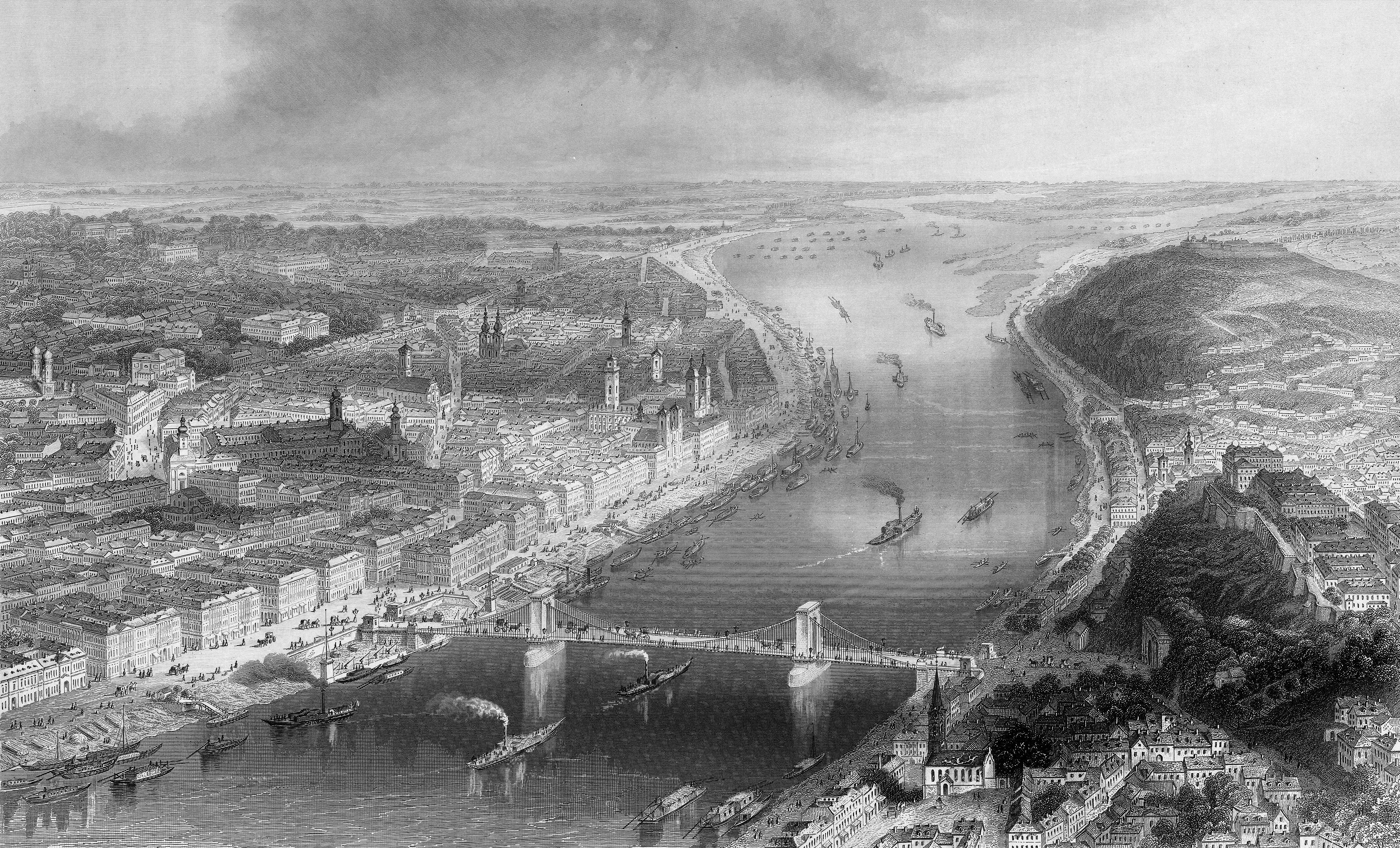
Buda and Pest in the mid-19th century

- 1851 - Leopoldstadt Basilica, a Romanesque building begun.
- 1853 - Budapest Philharmonic Orchestra founded.
- 1857 - Pest Academy of Commerce founded.
- 1859 - Dohány Street Synagogue consecrated in Pest.
- 1860 - Raitzenbad (bath) rebuilt.
- 1864 - Vigadó Concert Hall built.
- 1865
  - Esterhazy Gallery of art established.
  - Hungarian Academy of Sciences building constructed in Pest.
  - University of Theatre and Film Arts in Budapest established.
- 1867
  - 8 June: Coronation of Franz Joseph as King of Hungary.
  - Austro-Hungarian Compromise of 1867, followed by unprecedented civic development, resulting in the style of present-day Budapest.
  - Budapesti Közlöny government newspaper headquartered in Pest.
- 1868
  - Municipal council established in Pest.
  - Borsszem Jankó humor magazine headquartered in Pest.
  - Leopold Basilica built in Pest.
- 1869
  - János Gundel restaurant in business.
  - Margaret Island park opens.
  - Geological Museum of Budapest established.
  - Combined population: 270,685.
- 1870
  - Közmunkatanács (metro planning entity) established.
  - Zagreb-Budapest railway begins operating.
  - Café Gerbeaud moves to Régi Színház Square.
- 1872
  - Military academy built in Pest.
  - Rumbach Street Synagogue built.

=== 1873–1900 ===
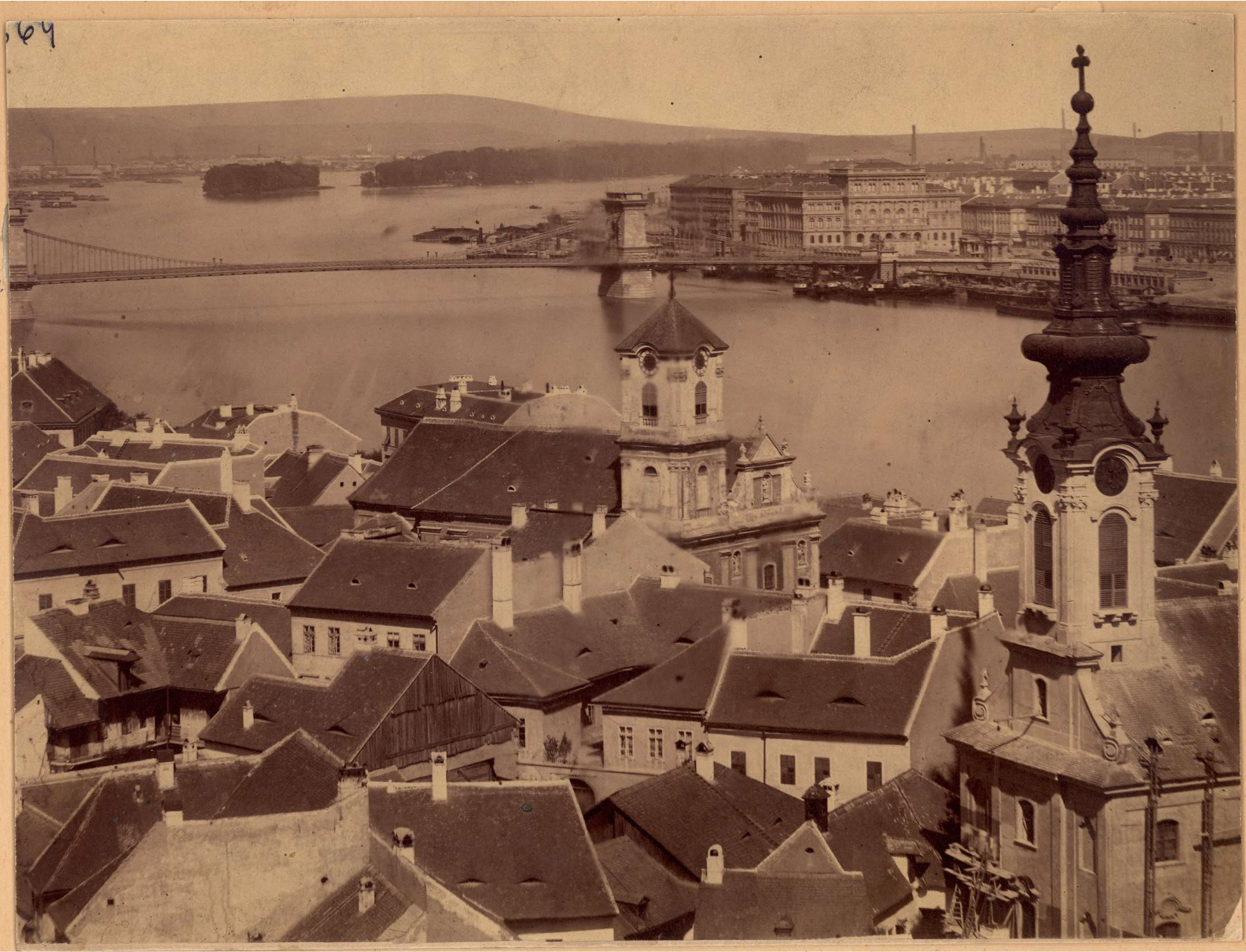
Budapest in the 1870s

- 1873
  - 17 November: The former cities: Pest, Buda and Óbuda are united, and with that the Hungarian capital is established with the name of Budapest.
  - Ráth Károly becomes Mayor of Budapest
  - Coat of arms of Budapest design adopted.
  - Budapesti Szemle scholarly journal headquartered in city.
- 1874
  - Budapest Cog-wheel Railway service is inaugurated.
  - Customhouse built.
  - Egyetértés newspaper headquartered in city.
- 1875
  - 26 June: Storm.
  - Liszt Academy of Music founded.
- 1876
  - Andrássy Avenue opens.
  - Margaret Bridge built.
- 1877
  - Budapest-Nyugati Railway Terminal opens.
  - Országos Pedagógiai Könyvtár és Múzeum founded.
- 1878
  - Electric public lighting installed in the city centre.
  - Pesti Hírlap newspaper in publication.
  - Bolond Istók humor magazine begins publication.
- 1880 - Combined population: 360,551.
- 1881
  - Budapesti Hírlap newspaper begins publication.
  - Population: 370,767 (75,794 in Buda + 294,973 in Pest).

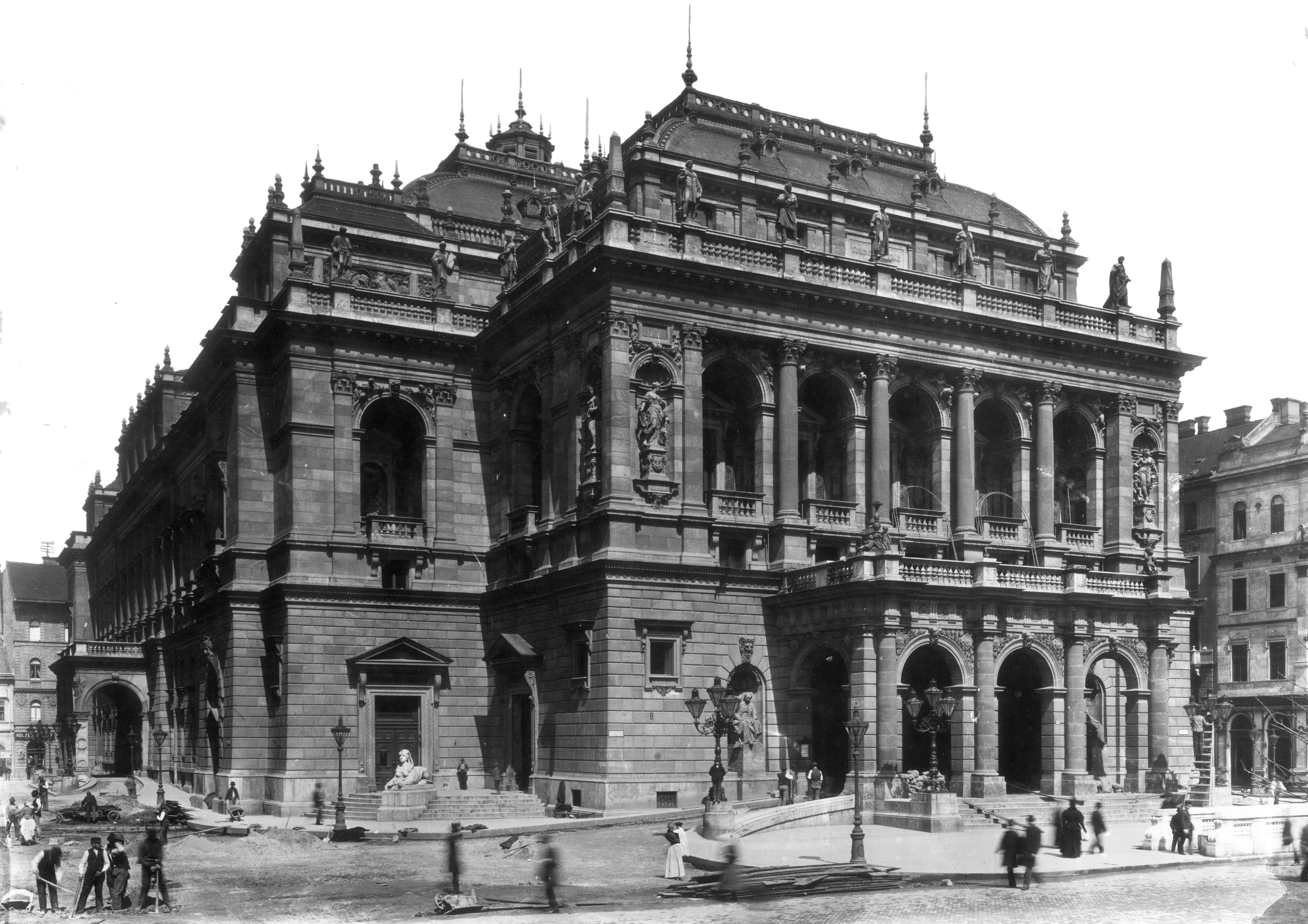
Hungarian State Opera House in the 1890s

- 1884
  - Budapest Keleti railway station opens.
  - Hungarian State Opera House opens.
- 1885
  - Dobos torte (cake) introduced.
  - 16 June: Újpest FC football club founded.
- 1886
  - Budapest Opera Ball begins.
  - Manfred Weiss Ammunition Factory begins operating near city.
- 1887 - the first Electric tram begins operating.
- 1888 - MTK Budapest FC football club founded.
- 1891 - Population: 491,938.
- 1892 - Cholera epidemic.
- 1893
  - Electric power plant built.
  - Electrification of Budapest finished.
- 1894
  - March: Funeral of Lajos Kossuth.
  - Aquincum Museum and New York Café open.
  - Nemzeti Szalon (art society) founded.
  - Wampetics (later Gundel) restaurant in business
  - New York Palace Hotel opens.

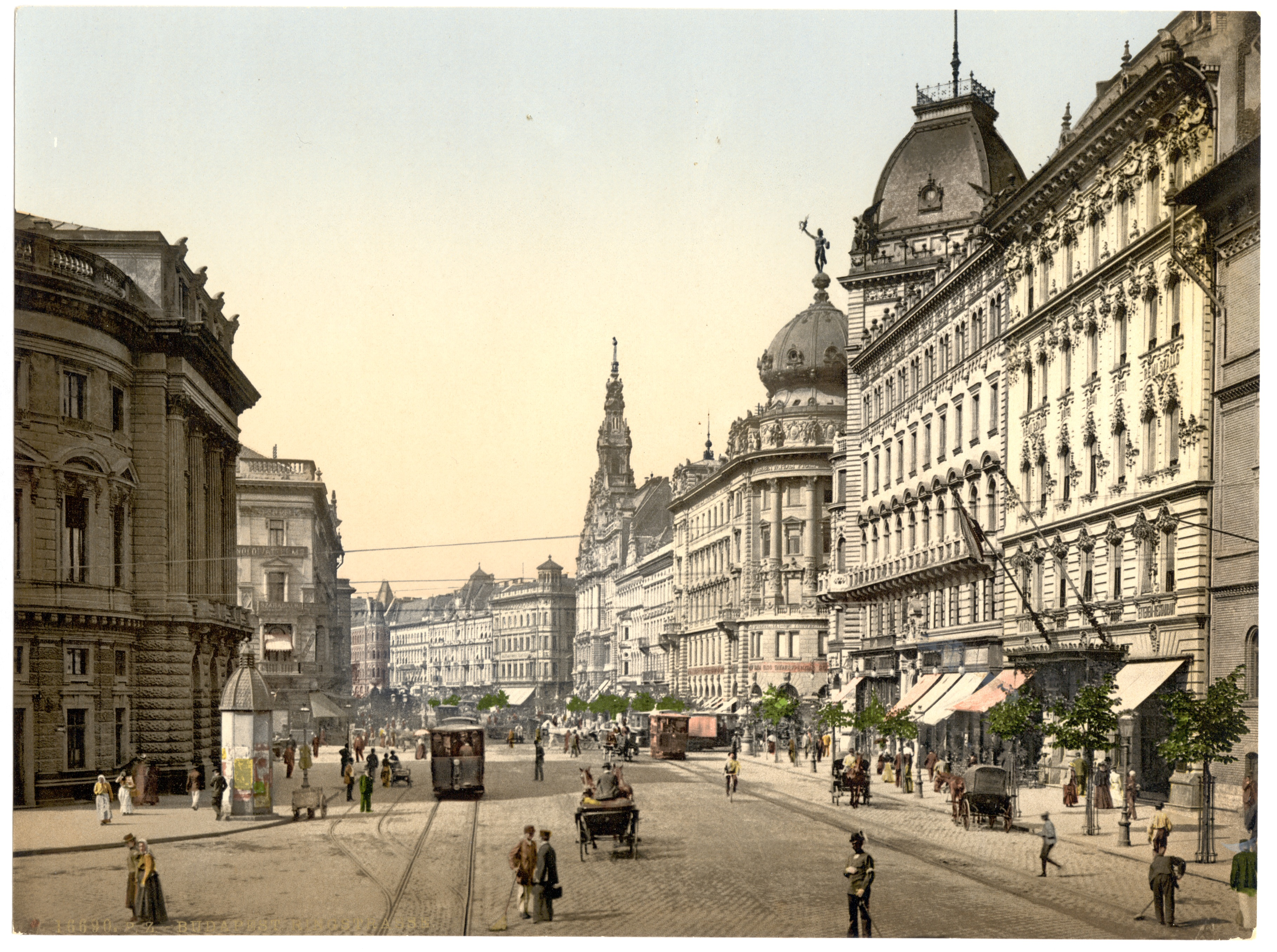
Budapest in the 1890s

- 1895
  - January: Budapest hosts the 1895 European Figure Skating Championships.
  - Hall of Art, Budapest built.
- 1896
  - Budapest Metro begins operating.
  - Hungary Millennium Celebrations.

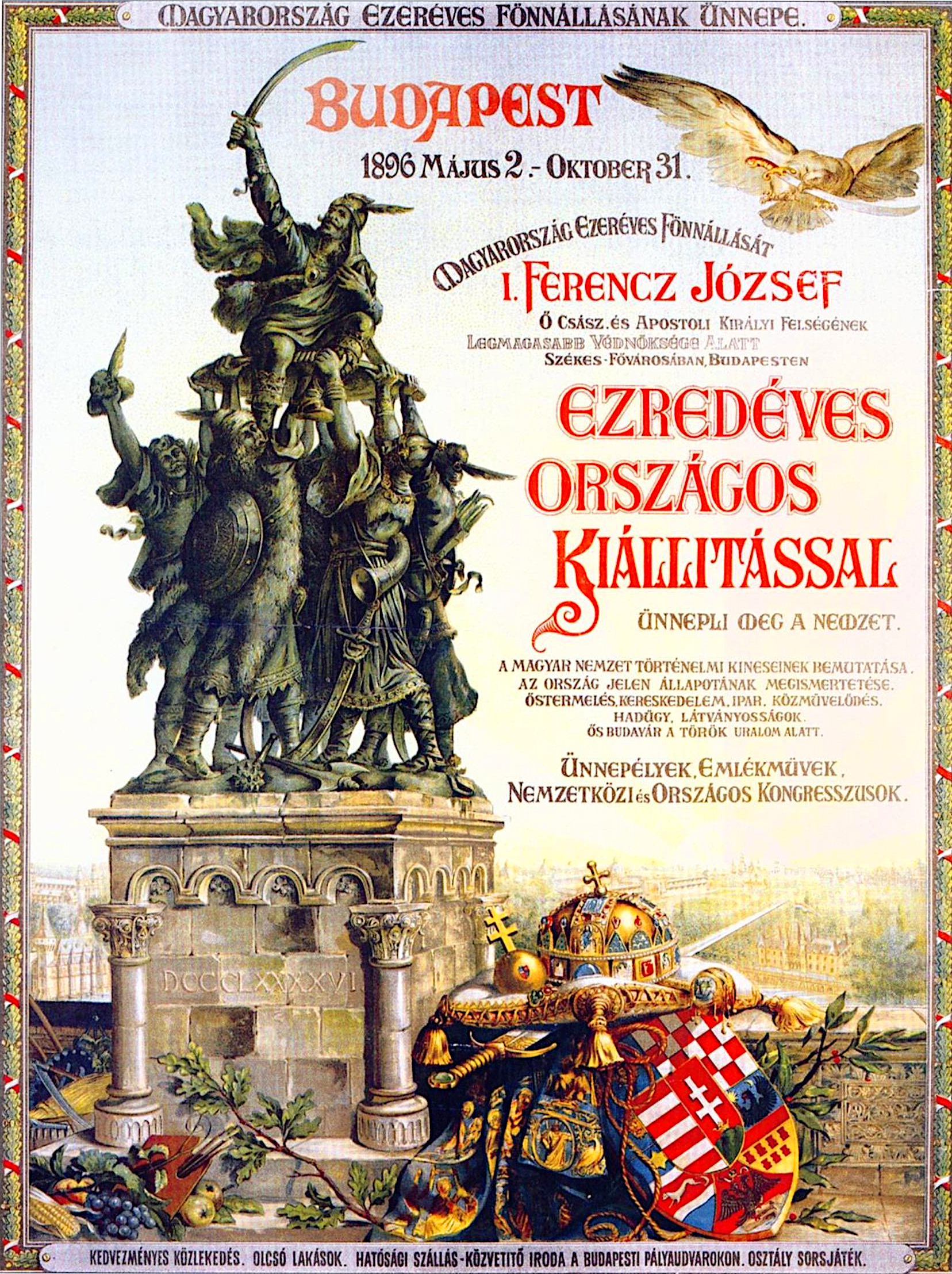
National Millennium Exhibition poster, 1896

  - Franz Joseph Bridge, Grand Boulevard, and Museum of Applied Arts built.
- 1899
  - Hungarian Transportation Museum opens.
  - Uránia Hungarian Scientific Theatre active.
  - Institute of Geology built.
  - 3 May: Ferencvárosi TC football club founded.
- 1900
  - Heroes' Square constructed, with its Millennium Memorial.
  - Population: 732,222.

== 20th century ==
=== 1901–1945 ===
- 1901
  - 21 December: Economic unrest.
  - Postal Savings Bank built.
  - Gödöllö artists' colony founded near city.
- 1902
  - Hungarian Parliament Building construction completed.
  - Fortuna cinema opens.
- 1903
  - Cifrapalota built.
  - Elisabeth Bridge and Varosliget Picture House open.
- 1904 - Thalia Theatre opens.
- 1905
  - Museum of Fine Arts built.
  - St. Stephen's Basilica reconstruction completed.
- 1906
  - István Bárczy becomes mayor.
  - Gresham Palace built.
- 1908 - Nyugat literary magazine begins publication.
- 1909
  - January: Budapest hosts the 1909 European Figure Skating Championships and co-hosts the 1909 World Figure Skating Championships.
  - Athletic Club of Kispest established.
  - Endre Nagy cabaret active.
- 1909–1910 - Electric public lighting expanded to the suburbs, the nearby towns villages had Electric public lighting.

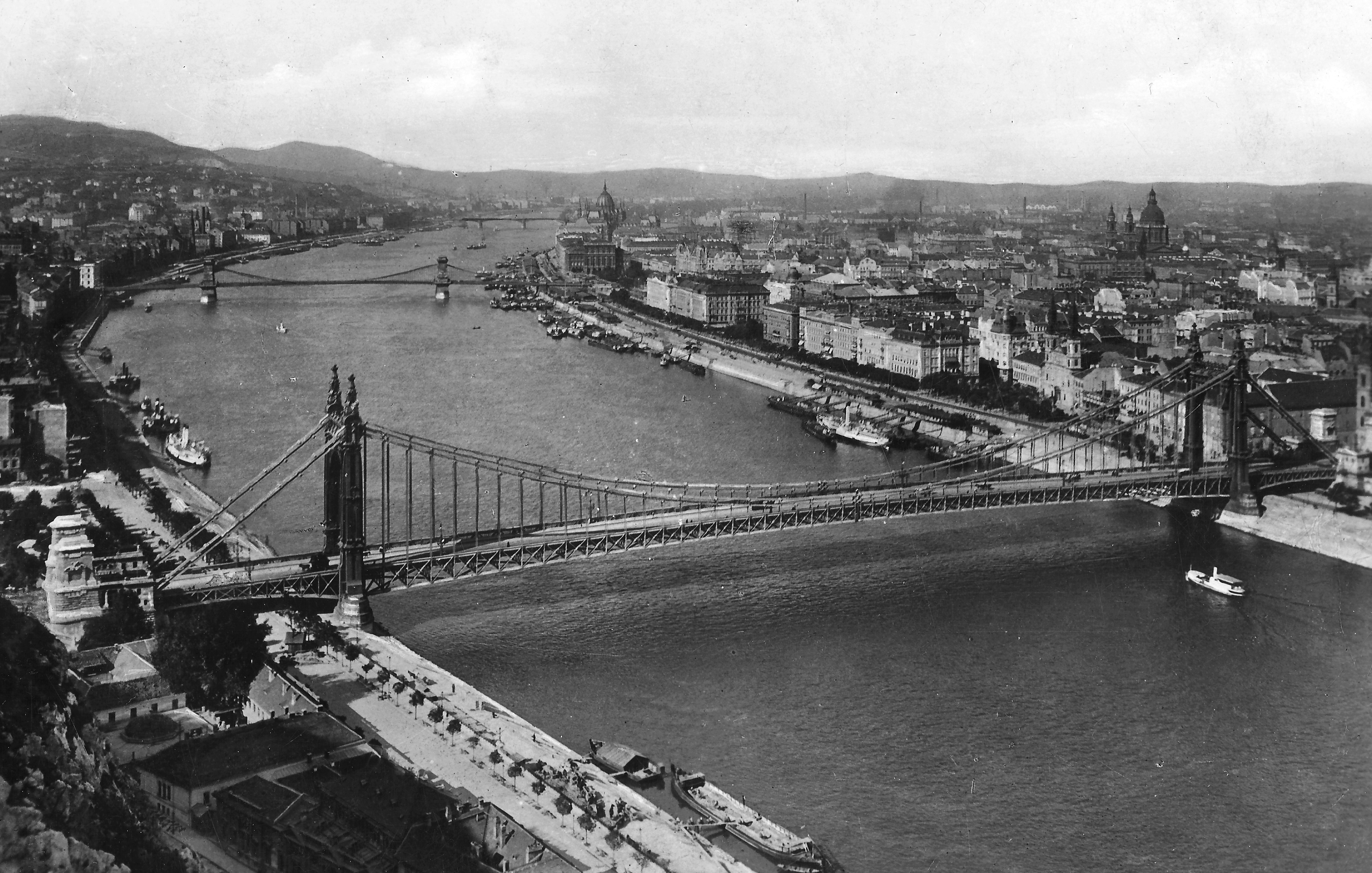
Aerial view of Budapest in 1910

- 1910
  - Population: The census finds 880,000 people in Budapest and 55,000 in the largest suburb of Újpest (now part of Budapest).
- 1911 - Budapest hosts the 1911 European Wrestling Championships.
- 1913 - Bozsik Stadion (stadium) built.
- 1915 - A Tett cultural magazine begins publication.
- 1916 - Helios cinema and Magyar Zsidó Museum open.
- 1918
  - 31 October: Socialist Aster Revolution begins. Revolution and the 133 days of the Hungarian Republic of Councils (March–August 1919) under the leadership of Béla Kun. It is the first Communist government to be formed in Europe after the October Revolution in Russia.
- 1919
  - 21 March: City becomes capital of the Hungarian Soviet Republic.
  - 6 August: French-supported Romanian forces enter city. The Communist government collapsed and its leaders fled. In retaliation for the Red Terror, reactionary crews now exacted revenge in a two-year wave of violent repression known today as the White Terror.
  - 1 November: Budapest becomes capital of the Hungarian Democratic Republic, established by Mihály Károlyi.
  - 14 November: Romanian occupation ends.
  - 16 November: Miklós Horthy and National Army enter Budapest; regency government established in 1920.
- 1920 - Corvinus University of Budapest founded.
- 1921
  - Magyar Írás newspaper begins publication.
  - Population: 1,184,616.
  - 18 December: 1921 Hungary v Poland football match.
- 1924 - Hungarian National Bank is founded.
- 1925 - Hungarian Radio commences broadcasting.
- 1926
  - Corvin Áruház (shop) in business on Blaha Lujza tér.
  - Forum Cinema active.
- 1929 - Budapest co-hosts the 1929 World Figure Skating Championships.
- 1930 - Population: 1,442,869.
- 1933
  - Disassembly of the Tabán commences.
  - April: National Socialist demonstrations.
  - August: Budapest hosts the 1933 European Rowing Championships.
  - Budapest hosts the 1933 World Fencing Championships.
- 1934
  - Józef Bem monument unveiled.
  - MAFC basketball team founded.
- 1935
  - February: Budapest co-hosts the 1935 World Figure Skating Championships.
  - August: Budapest hosts the 1935 International University Games.
- 1937 - Petőfi Bridge built.
- 1938
  - Magyar Optical Works active.
  - Barlang cinema opens.
- 1939 - 24 May: Polish Institute in Budapest opened (see also Hungary–Poland relations).
- 1944
  - 19 March - German forces occupy Budapest. At the time of the occupation, there were 184,000 Jews and between 65,000 and 80,000 Christians of Jewish descent in the town. The Arrow Cross collaborated with the Germans in murdering Jews. Fewer than half of Budapest's Jews (approximately 119,000) survived the following 11 months.
  - 19 March: Polish Institute in Budapest closed following German occupation.
  - 3 November: Budapest Offensive by Soviet forces begins.
  - 26 December: Siege of Budapest begins.
- 1945
  - 15–18 January: Soviet and Romanian troops besiege Budapest. The retreating Germans destroy all Danube bridges. On 18 January, the Soviets complete the occupation of Pest.
  - 13 February: The Buda castle falls; Siege of Budapest ends. World War II took the lives of close to 200,000 Budapest residents and caused widespread damage to the buildings of the city.

=== 1946–1990s ===
- 1946
  - Kossuth Bridge built.
  - Széll Kálmán Square renamed "Moscow Square."
- 1947 - Liberty Statue (Budapest) erected.
- 1949
  - City becomes capital of the Hungarian People's Republic.
  - Budapest hosts the 2nd World Festival of Youth and Students.
- 1950
  - The former towns of Budafok, Csepel, Kispest, Pestszenterzsébet, Pestszentlőrinc, Rákospalota, and Újpest, and 16 former villages are incorporated into Budapest.
  - May: Budapest hosts the EuroBasket Women 1950.
  - November: Árpád Bridge opens.
  - Budapesti Honvéd SE basketball team founded.
- 1951 - Polish Institute in Budapest reopened.
- 1952 - Esti Budapest newspaper begins publication.
- 1953
  - The multi-functional sports stadium Népstadion opens, with an initial capacity of 100,000 people.
  - Rákosi bunker built.
- 1954 -
  - 1954 Hungary v England football match.
  - Protests in Budapest following Hungary's defeat at the FIFA World Cup final.
- 1955
  - January: Budapest hosts the 1955 European Figure Skating Championships.
  - June: Budapest hosts the EuroBasket 1955.

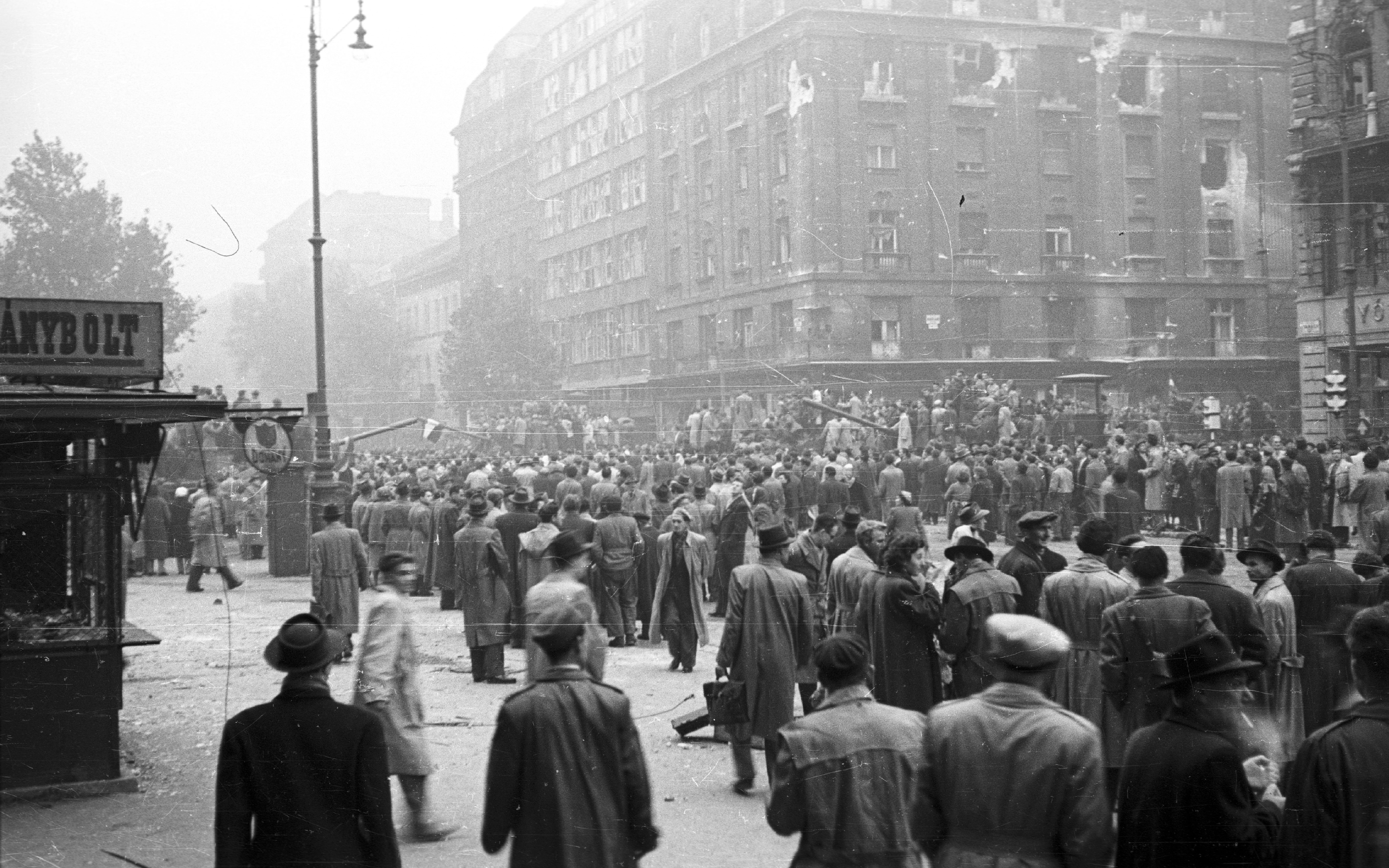
Hungarian Revolution of 1956 in Budapest

- 1956
  - 12 January – A magnitude 5.8 earthquake strikes, killing two and injuring 38 others.
  - 23 October–4 November – The Hungarian Revolution of 1956 breaks out, crushed by the invasion of a large Soviet force.
  - Népszabadság newspaper headquartered in city.
- 1959
  - Budapest hosts the 1959 World Fencing Championships.
  - Béla Balázs Studio of film established.
- 1960s - Wartime damage is largely repaired.
- 1963
  - February: Budapest hosts the 1963 European Figure Skating Championships.
  - December: Budapest hosts the 1963 World Rhythmic Gymnastics Championships.
- 1964 - Elizabeth Bridge rebuilt, the final bridge to be repaired postwar.
- 1965 - Budapest hosts the 1965 Summer Universiade.
- 1966 - Budapest hosts the 1966 European Athletics Championships.
- 1968
  - Budapest Transport established.
  - Iparterv art group active.
- 1969 - Marriott hotel built.
- 1970 - The first phase of the East-Western Metro begin operating.
- 1972 - Moszkva tér (Budapest Metro) opens at Moscow Square.
- 1974
  - Rubik's Cube invented.
  - Population: 2,051,354.
- 1975 - Budapest-Déli Railway Terminal built.
- 1976
  - The first phase of the North-Southern Metro begins.
  - Hilton hotel built.
- 1977 - Budapest Treaty signed.
- 1979 - Artpool founded.
- 1982 - Budapest Sportcsarnok sports hall opens.
- 1983
  - March: Budapest hosts the 1983 European Athletics Indoor Championships.
  - April: Budapest hosts the 1983 European Wrestling Championships.
  - Budapest Festival Orchestra founded.
- 1985 - Petőfi Csarnok youth center opens.
- 1986 - Queen perform a concert at Népstadion as part of their Magic Tour.
- 1987
  - Budapest designated an UNESCO World Heritage Site.
  - Dimitrov Square renamed "Church Square."
- 1988 - Budapest hosts the 1988 World Figure Skating Championships.
- 1989
  - June: State reinternment funeral of Imre Nagy and other martyrs of the 1956 revolution.
  - City becomes part of the Third Hungarian Republic.
- 1990
  - Gábor Demszky becomes mayor.
  - Budapest Stock Exchange re-established.
  - Population: The city is home to 2,016,100 residents.
  - Gyöngyösi utca (Budapest Metro) opens.
- 1991 - Budapest hosts the 1991 World Fencing Championships.
- 1992 - Kempinski Hotel Corvinus in business.
- 1995 - Rákóczi Bridge opens.
- 1996
  - March: Budapest co-hosts the 1996 European Wrestling Championships.
  - European Roma Rights Center established.
  - The first shopping mall in Hungary, Duna Plaza opens, soon followed by Pólus Center.
  - Corvin cinema opens.
- 1997 - Budapest Pride is held for the first time.
- 1998 - Budapest hosts the 1998 European Athletics Championships.
- 1999
  - WestEnd City Center shopping mall opens.
  - Budapest Sportcsarnok is destroyed in a fire.
- 2000 - Buda Health Center established.

== 21st century ==
- 2001 - December: International academics meet in Budapest, formulate "Open Access" statement.
- 2002
  - August: Flood.
  - National Theatre (Budapest) rebuilt.
  - Andrássy Avenue is added to the list of World heritage Sites, along with the Millennium Underground railway and Heroes' Square.
- 2003: László Papp Budapest Sports Arena opens in place of the former Budapest Sportcsarnok.
- 2004
  - 1 May: Hungary joins the European Union.
  - Budapest City Archives new building opens.
  - December: Budapest co-hosts the 2004 European Women's Handball Championship.
- 2006
  - September–October: Anti-government protests in Kossuth Lajos square.
  - Budapest Fringe Festival begins.
  - 200 km of the 1000 km road in capital level local government handling is reconstructed after 80 km in the former year. The world's longest trams, Siemens Combino Supras start service on Grand Boulevard, by the end of the year 150 Volvo 7700 buses take part in replacing the aging BKV fleet. Reconstruction of metro line 2 finishes.
- 2008
  - The Eastern part of the M0 motorway around the city with Megyeri Bridge is finished and given to public. The new Northern Railway Bridge is finished and is opened to public.
  - By this year 400 km road have been reconstructed due to the road reconstruction program paired with pipe (heating and water) replacements to modern, narrow and heat-conserving ones, and where needed sewer system expansion or replacement.
- 2009 - The 2007-2009 complete reconstruction of Liberty Bridge finishes.
- 2010
  - István Tarlós is elected mayor.
  - The Central Wastewater Treatment Plant starts its normal operation. This increases biologically treated sewage from 51% to 100%.
- 2011
  - The 2009-2011 complete and historical reconstruction of Margaret Bridge finishes.
  - Monument to the victims of the Katyn massacre unveiled by Presidents of Hungary and Poland.
  - Population: 1,729,040 city; 3,284,110 metro.
- 2012 - Protest related to new Constitution of Hungary.
- 2014
  - First phase of Line 4 (Budapest Metro) opens for use by the public.
  - 2014 Hungarian Internet tax protests.
- 2015
  - June: Budapest co-hosts the EuroBasket Women 2015.
  - September: Demonstration by migrants.
- 2016
  - March: Share of modern, air conditioned low-floor buses increases over 80%.
  - July–August: Budapest hosts the 2016 European Lacrosse Championship.
  - October: Budapest hosts the 2016 European Table Tennis Championships.
  - October: Monument to Polish solidarity and aid for the Hungarian Revolution of 1956 unveiled.
  - December: Budapest hosts the 2016 World Wrestling Championships.
- 2017
  - May: Budapest hosts the 2017 Rhythmic Gymnastics European Championships.
  - 26 June: Henryk Sławik and József Antall monument unveiled.
  - July: Budapest hosts the 2017 World Aquatics Championships.
  - August–September: Budapest hosts the 2017 World Judo Championships.
  - Ferenc Puskás Stadium (formerly Népstadion) is demolished.
- 2018
  - April: Monument to the victims of the Smolensk air disaster unveiled.
  - October: Budapest hosts the 2018 World Wrestling Championships.
- 2019
  - Gergely Karácsony is elected mayor.
  - July: Budapest hosts the 2019 World Fencing Championships.
  - September: Budapest hosts the 2019 World Modern Pentathlon Championships.
  - Puskás Aréna sports stadium opens.
- 2021
  - May: Budapest co-hosts the 2020 European Aquatics Championships.
  - June: Budapest hosts the 2021 World Judo Championships.
- 2022
  - January: Budapest co-hosts the 2022 European Men's Handball Championship.
  - June–July: Budapest co-hosts the 2022 World Aquatics Championships.

== See also ==
- History of Budapest
- Pasha of Buda, 1541-1686 (includes list of names)
- List of mayors of Budapest (főpolgármesterek), since 1873
- List of mayors (hu:Budapest polgármestereinek listája), since 1873
- List of city council presidents (hu:Budapest tanácselnökeinek listája), since 1950
- History of Pest (in Hungarian)
- Other names of Budapest
- List of sights and historic places in Budapest
- Timelines of other cities in Hungary: Debrecen

== Bibliography ==
=== in English ===
- William Henry Overall, ed. (1870). "Buda". Dictionary of Chronology. London: William Tegg. hdl:2027/uc2.ark:/13960/t9m32q949 – via HathiTrust.
- Albert Shaw (1897). "Budapest". Municipal government in continental Europe. New York: Century Co. hdl:2027/uc2.ark:/13960/t9m32rg8w.
- "Pesth", Chambers's Encyclopaedia, London: W. & R. Chambers, 1901, hdl:2027/uc2.ark:/13960/t0ft8v96d
- Alexander Büchler (1907), "Budapest", Jewish Encyclopedia, vol. 3, New York
- Briliant, Oscar (1910). "Budapest" . Encyclopædia Britannica. Vol. 4 (11th ed.). pp. 734–737.
- Benjamin Vincent (1910), "Buda", Haydn's Dictionary of Dates (25th ed.), London: Ward, Lock & Co.
- New York Public Library (1913). "Budapest". List of Works Relating to City Charters, Ordinances, and Collected Documents.
- "Budapest" . Encyclopædia Britannica. Vol. 30 (12th ed.). 1922.
- István Deák (1968). "Budapest and the Hungarian Revolutions of 1918-1919". Slavonic and East European Review. 46 (106): 129–140. JSTOR 4205930.
- Mario D. Fenyo (1987). "Literature and Political Change: Budapest, 1908-1918". Transactions of the American Philosophical Society. 77 (6): 1–156. doi:10.2307/1006574. JSTOR 1006574.
- Judit Bodnár (1998). "Assembling the Square: Social Transformation in Public Space and the Broken Mirage of the Second Economy in Postsocialist Budapest". Slavic Review. 57 (3): 489–515. doi:10.2307/2500709. JSTOR 2500709. S2CID 163176312.
- Judit Bodnaŕ (2001). Fin de Millénaire Budapest: Metamorphoses of Urban Life. University of Minnesota Press. ISBN 978-1-4529-0477-1.
- Zsuzsa L. Nagy (2002). Chris Wrigley (ed.). Budapest and the revolutions of 1918 and 1919. Routledge. p. 72+. ISBN 978-1-134-90143-2.
- Geza David (2009). "Buda". In Gabor Agoston; Bruce Alan Masters (eds.). Encyclopedia of the Ottoman Empire. Facts on File. ISBN 978-1-4381-1025-7.
- Robert Nemes (2009). "Budapest". In Emily Gunzburger Makas; Tanja Damljanovic Conley (eds.). Capital Cities in the Aftermath of Empires: Planning in Central and Southeastern Europe. Routledge. p. 141+. ISBN 978-1-135-16725-7.
- Colum Hourihane, ed. (2012). "Budapest". Grove Encyclopedia of Medieval Art and Architecture. Oxford University Press. ISBN 978-0-19-539536-5.
- John Lukacs (2012). Budapest 1900: A Historical Portrait of a City and Its Culture. Grove Press. ISBN 978-0-8021-9421-3.
- Michelle M. Metro-Roland (2012). Tourists, Signs and the City: The Semiotics of Culture in an Urban Landscape. Ashgate. ISBN 978-1-4094-9025-8. (about Budapest)
- Sebestyen, Victor (2022). Budapest: Between East and West (Hardcover). London: Weidenfeld & Nicolson. ISBN 9781474609999.

=== in other languages ===
- Neuer und vollständiger Führer durch Pest-Ofen [New and Complete Guide to Pest-Ofen] (in German) (2nd ed.). Pest: Eggenberger'sche Buchhandlung (Hoffmann & Molnár). 1870.
- Alexander Franz Heksch [in Hungarian] (1895). Illustrirter Führer durch Budapest [Illustrated Guide to Budapest] (in German). Vienna: A. Hartleben.
