= Dedication of the Basilica of Saint Mary Major =

Feast day in the General Roman Calendar of the Catholic Church

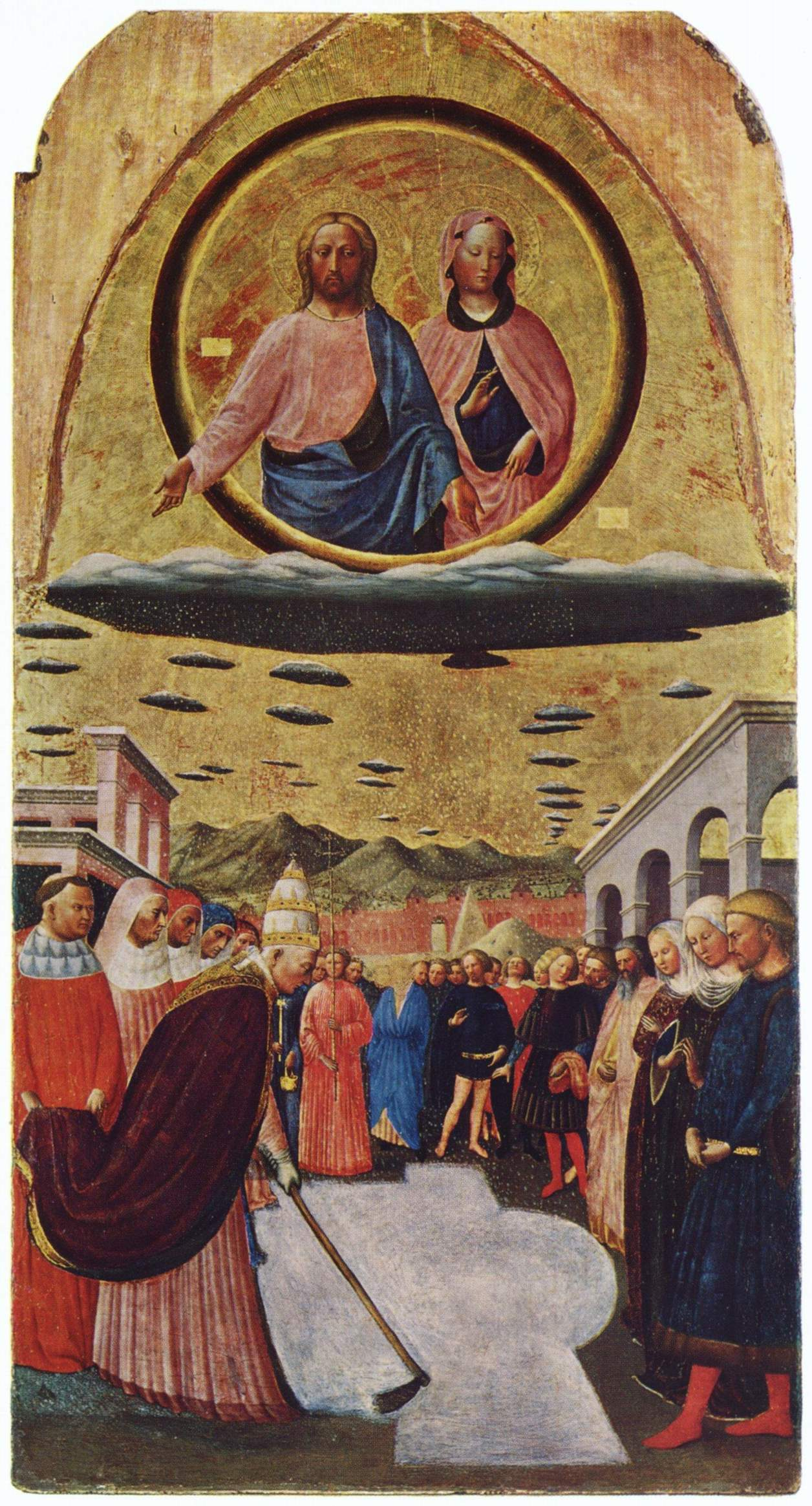
The Miracle of the Snow by Masolino da Panicale. Christ and the Blessed Virgin Mary look on Pope Liberius, who uses a hoe to mark the basilica's outline following the shape of the legendary snowfall.

The Dedication of the Basilica of St Mary Major (In Dedicatione basilicae S. Mariae) is a feast day in the General Roman Calendar of the Catholic Church, optionally celebrated annually on 5 August with the rank of memorial.

In earlier editions of the General Roman Calendar, down to that of 1960, it is called the Dedication of the Basilica of St Mary of the Snows (In Dedicatione basilicae S. Mariae ad Nives), a reference to the legendary story about the foundation of the basilica. For the same reason the feast is also known popularly as Our Lady of the Snows. The reference to the legend was removed in the 1969 revision of the General Roman Calendar.

== History ==
Pope Pius V inserted this feast into the General Roman Calendar in 1568, when, in response to the request of the Council of Trent, he reformed the Roman Breviary. Before that, it had been celebrated at first only in the church itself and, beginning in the 14th century, in all the churches of the city of Rome.

Accordingly, it appears in the Tridentine calendar for celebration as a Double. In Pope Clement VIII's Missal of 1604, it was given the newly invented rank of Greater Double. In Pope John XXIII's 1960 calendar, it became a Third-Class Feast. This 1960 calendar, included in the 1962 edition of the Roman Missal, is the calendar whose continued use privately and, under certain conditions, is publicly authorized by the motu proprio Summorum Pontificum. Nine years later, the celebration became an optional memorial.

The feast commemorates the dedication by Pope Sixtus III of the rebuilt Basilica di Santa Maria Maggiore just after the First Council of Ephesus. This major basilica, located on the summit of the Esquiline Hill in Rome, is called the Basilica of Santa Maria Maggiore (Latin: Basilica Sanctae Mariae Maioris) because it is the largest church in Rome dedicated to the Blessed Virgin Mary.

The original church, which was replaced by that of Pope Sixtus III, was built during the pontificate of Pope Liberius (352–366), and is thus sometimes known as the Basilica Liberii or Basilica Liberiana.

== Legend ==
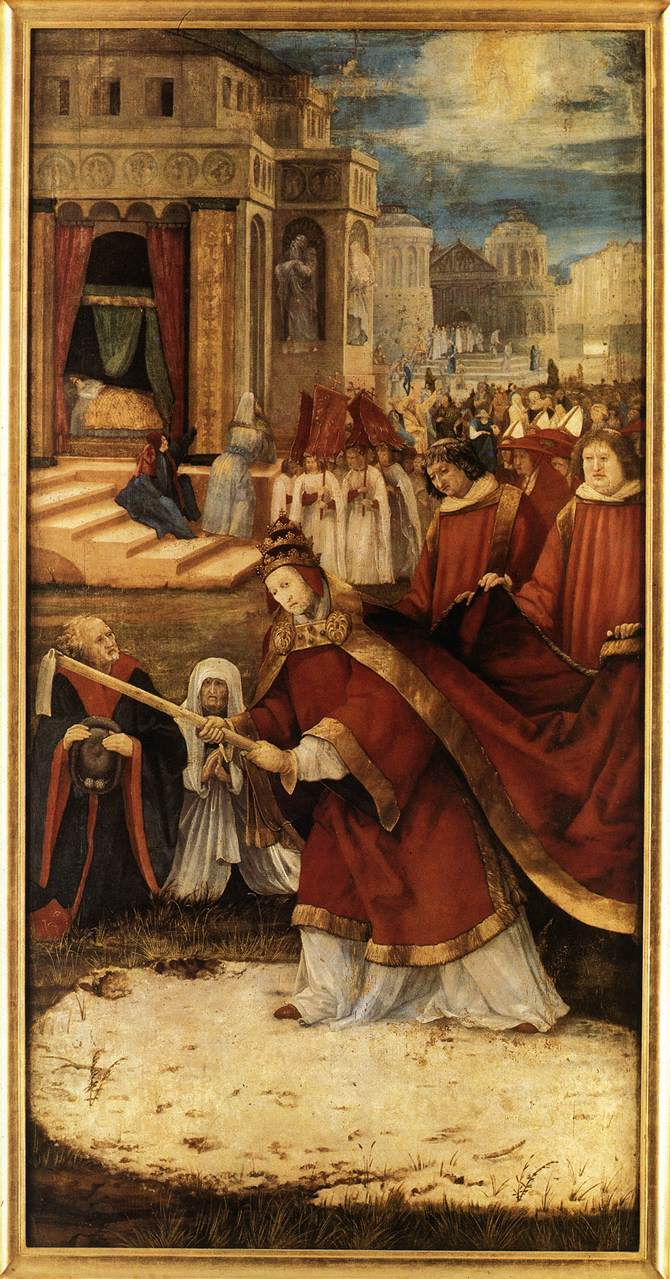
Our Lady of the Snows (c. 1517–1519), by Matthias Grünewald

Until 1969 the feast was known as Dedicatio Sanctae Mariae ad Nives (Dedication of the Church of Our Lady of the Snows), a name that had become popular for the Basilica in the 14th century in connection with a legend about its origin that the Catholic Encyclopedia summarizes: (in the middle of the 4th century) "During the pontificate of Liberius, the Roman patrician John and his wife, who were without heirs, made a vow to donate their possessions to the Virgin Mary. They prayed that she might make known to them how they were to dispose of their property in her honour. On 5 August, at the height of the Roman summer, snow fell during the night on the summit of the Esquiline Hill. In obedience to a vision of the Virgin Mary that they had the same night, the couple built a basilica in honour of Mary on the very spot that was covered with snow. From the fact that no mention whatever is made of this alleged miracle until a few hundred years later, not even by Sixtus III in his eight-line dedicatory inscription ... it would seem that the legend has no historical basis." In fact there is no reference to the legend before the year 1000.

The popularity of the legend in the 15th century is shown in the painting of the Miracle of the Snow by Masolino da Panicale of around 1423, now in the Museo di Capodimonte, Naples, in which the miracle is depicted as witnessed by a crowd of men and women, with Jesus and the Virgin Mary observing from Heaven, and by the building in that century and the immediately following centuries of many churches dedicated to Our Lady of the Snows, of which 152 still exist in Italy. A more critical attitude began to prevail in the 18th century, as evidenced by the proposal that a congregation set up by Pope Benedict XIV presented to him in 1741 that the reading of the legend be removed from the Roman Breviary and that the original name, "Dedicatio Sanctae Mariae", be restored. This recommendation was implemented in 1969 – 228 years later.

== Legacy of the legend ==
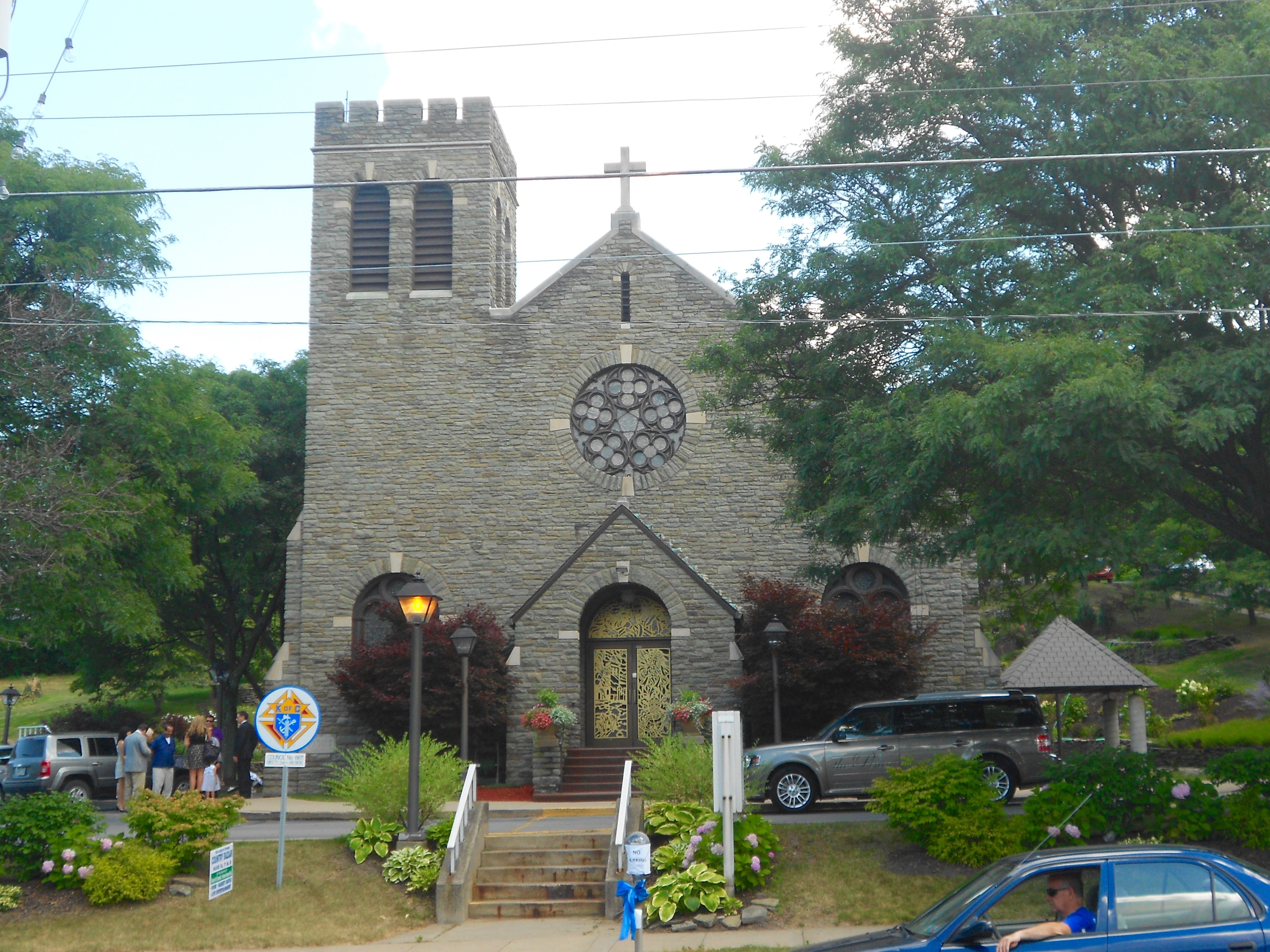
Our Lady of the Snows Parish, Clarks Summit, Pennsylvania

On 5 August each year, during the celebration of the liturgical feast of the Dedication of the Basilica of Saint Mary Major, a custom that commemorates the story of the miraculous snowfall is still maintained: at the conclusion of Solemn Mass, a shower of white rose petals is dropped from the ceiling.

At sunset on the same day, another artificial "snowfall" is staged as a tourist attraction in the square fronting the basilica.

Apart from the above-mentioned many shrines of the Madonna della Neve in Italy, the United States has a "National Shrine of Our Lady of the Snows" in Belleville, Illinois, and parishes dedicated to "Our Lady of the Snows" are located in Bigfork, Minnesota; Clarks Summit, Pennsylvania; Reno, Nevada; Floral Park, New York; Milford, Michigan; and Woodstock, Vermont.

In central Budapest, the 18th-century Church of Our Lady of the Snows (Krisztinaváros) is dedicated to the Lady of the Snows.

In Croatia, Bol on the island of Brač, Kukljica on the island of Ugljan, as well as the parish church in Mamre on the island of Pag are dedicated to the Lady of the Snows.

There is also the Kostol Panny Márie Snežnej on Calvary Hill in Bratislava, Slovakia as well as in Marsaxlokk in Malta, and also the Transfiguration of Our Lord Church in Cavinti, Laguna, where the Virgin under this title is secondary patroness (with the primary dedication, the Transfiguration, celebrated the next day). There is also Nuestra Señora de las Nieves in the Yucatán area of Mexico near the towns of Tulum & Playa Del Carmen. It is within the resort community of Grand Palladium.
