= Naphegy =

Naphegy (German: Sonnenberg, meaning "Sun Hill") is a hill and neighbourhood in Budapest, Hungary. It is part of Krisztinaváros and administratively belongs to the 1st District.

== Location ==
Naphegy rises south of the center of Krisztinaváros, between Gellérthegy and Tabán. Its boundaries are Hegyalja út, Naphegy utca, Gellérthegy utca and Mészáros utca.

The highest point (154 m) is on Naphegy tér (Naphegy Circus).

== History ==
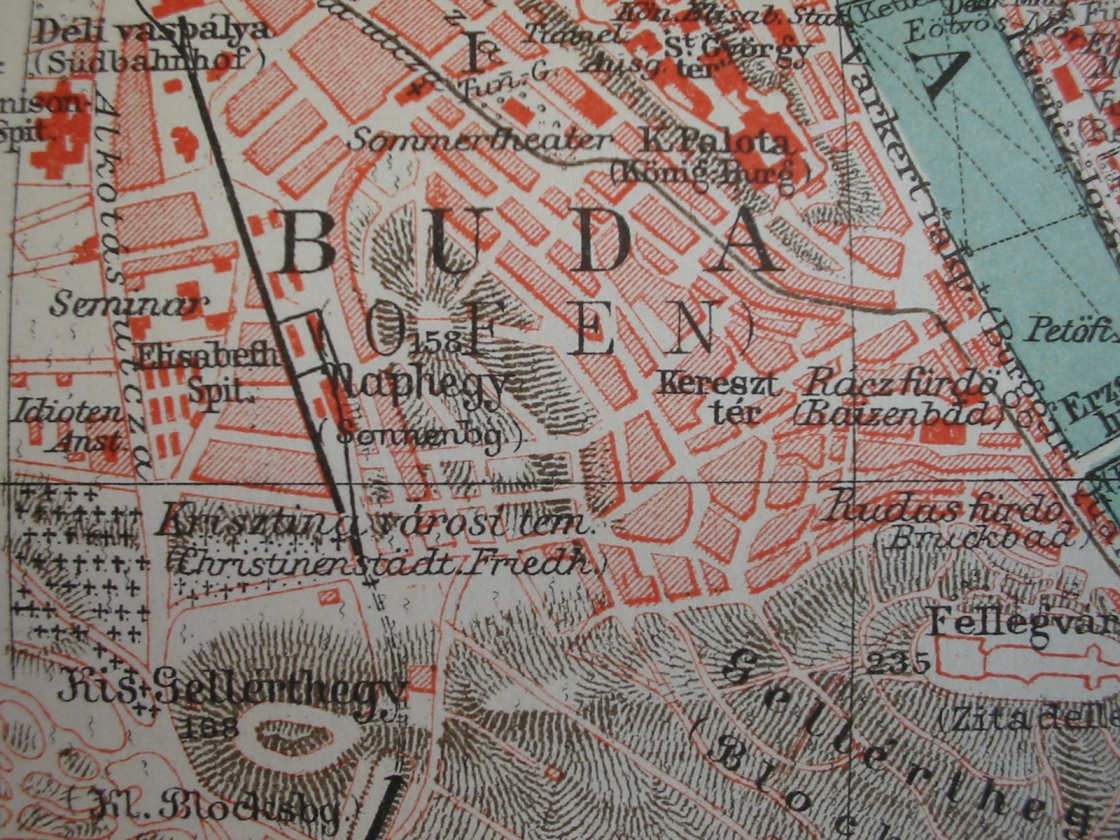
Naphegy and Tabán in 1905.

The history of Naphegy is inseparable from that of the neighboring Tabán and Gellérthegy. In the Middle Ages the hill was called Nyárshegy ("Stake Hill"), probably referring to its function as a scaffold. (The name is preserved in the name of today's Nyárs Street, where the traitor Lieutenant Conrad Fink – who, during the 1686 siege of Buda, planned to surrender the Castle of Buda to the Pasha of Fehérvár – was executed in 1687.) In 1686 Buda was freed from the Turks. Naphegy played a vital role in this: from the hill the castle walls could be kept under incessant cannon fire. In the 17th–18th centuries newly settled Serbs resurrected viticulture in the area. (The phylloxera epidemic of the 1880s brought vinegrowing to the end.) The slopes of the hill remained unbuilt for centuries. A map by Benedict J. from 1896 shows the hill still unbuilt at that time.

Plaque to Margit Kaffka, Naphegy street 15.

On a map from 1885 five streets of Naphegy are mentioned: Mészáros (Butcher), Gellérthegy ("Gellért Hill"), Naphegy, Lisznyai and Czakó Streets. The area bordered by these streets was still unbuilt. The immediate surroundings of today's Naphegy tér were still empty according to the Meyers Konversations-Lexikon, published in 1905, but the Révai Lexicon published between 1910 and 1914 shows the whole area built up. Most of the buildings on Naphegy today were built between 1910 and 1939.

The history of Naphegy is inseparable from that of the neighboring Tabán district. After the 1930 urban planning in Budapest, only a few old Tabán houses were left in the Naphegy area; one of them was the Tabán school, destroyed during the battle of Budapest, January 1945. Today a sports field is found where once the school had been.

The events of World War II in this area can be followed from the diaries and memoirs of its inhabitants. László Deseő, who was 15 years old in 1944, lived in 32 Mészáros Street with his family. This was one of the most heavily attacked areas because of its proximity to the Southern Railway Station and the strategical importance of the hill. Deseő kept a diary throughout the siege. The memoirs of András Németh also describe the siege and the bombing of the empty school building which he and his fellow soldiers used as an observation post shortly before.

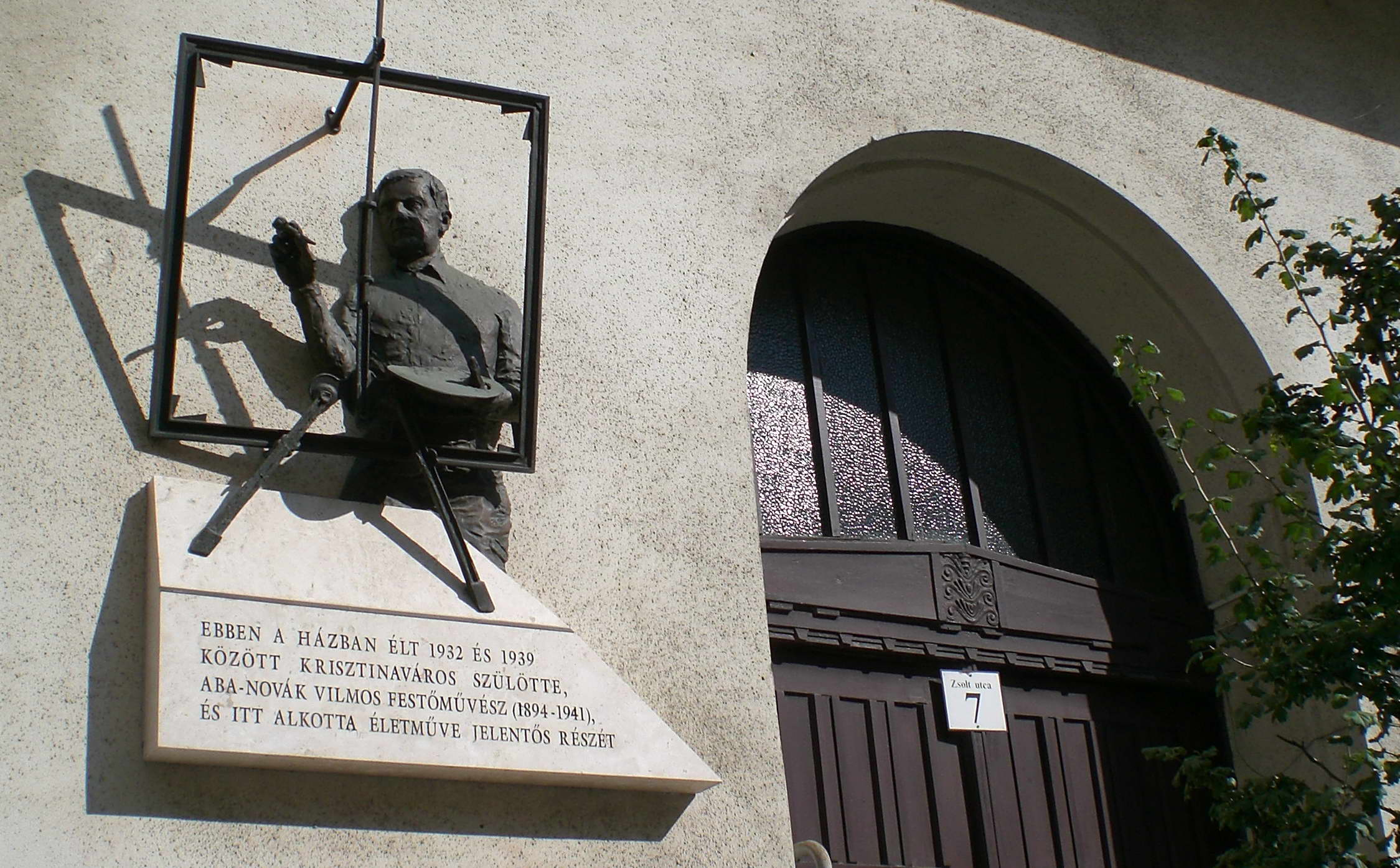
Vilmos Aba Novák painter-s home Budapest, Zsolt utca 7.

After 1945 the pupils from Naphegy attended the Krisztina Téri Iskola (Christina Square Grade School), while the new school in Lisznyai Street was under construction. In 1953 the MTI (Hungarian News Agency) moved to its new headquarters atop Naphegy.

One of the houses typical of old Tabán can be seen on the corner of Czakó and Aladár Streets. Before 1953 there was a similar house in place of today's Lisznyai Street School.

Duna TV, the first satellite TV channel of Hungary began broadcasting on December 24, 1992. Originally based in the Róna Street building of Mafilm, the staff moved to the Mészáros Street of Naphegy in 1994.

== Famous people ==
- János Fadrusz, sculptor (built his villa and study on the south slopes of the hill)
- Péter Gárdos, journalist (a memorial plaque of him is placed on the wall of the Naphegy Square building of MTI Hungarian News Agency)
- Margit Kaffka, writer (lived in 15 Naphegy Street from July 1915 to her death in December 1918)
- Józsi Jenő Tersánszky (lived in 9 Avar Street)
- Endre Vészi (lived in Angelikaváros)

== Institutions ==
- Magyar Távirati Iroda (Hungarian News Agency, MTI)
- Duna Televízió
- Lisznyai Street School

== List of streets and squares in Naphegy ==
- Aladár Street
- Ág Street
- Czakó Street
- Derék Street
- Dezső Street
- Fenyő Street
- Fém Street
- Galeotti Street
- Gellérthegy Street
- Lisznyai Street
- Naphegy Square 47.493168°N 19.032602°E
- Naphegy Street
- Nyárs Street
- Orvos Street
- Párduc Street
- Piroska Street
- Róka Street
- Tibor Street
- Tigris Street
- Zsolt Street

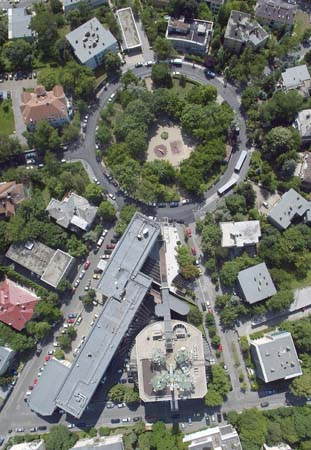
Aerial photography of Naphegy

== Sources ==
- Meyers Konversations-Lexikon 1905

- Révai Lexicon 1910
- Élet és Tudomány – Szablyár Péter: A Nap-hegy text in Hungarian, with rare old maps of Naphegy
