= Church of Our Lady of the Snows (Krisztinaváros) =

Coordinates: 47°29′49″N 19°1′53″E

- Hungarian: Krisztinavárosi Havas Boldogasszony Plébániatemplom
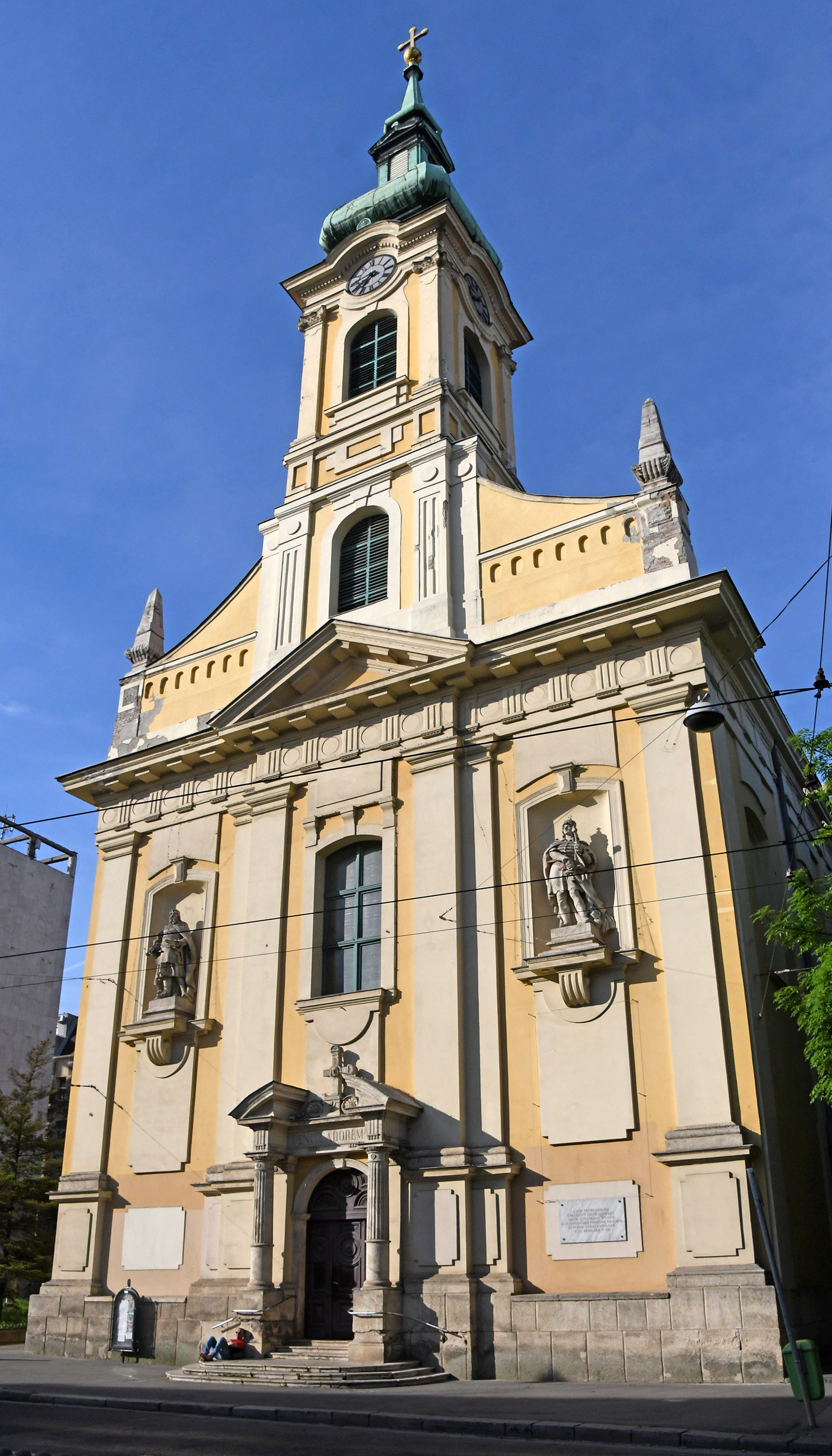
- Main façade of the church from Krisztina tér, 2023

- Location: Krisztinaváros, Budapest
- Country: Hungary
- Denomination: Roman Catholic

History
- Status: Parish church

Architecture
- Functional status: Active
- Architect(s): Kristóf Hikisch, József Hild (redesign, 1850s)
- Style: Baroque, Zopfstil
- Years built: 1795–1797 (altered 19th–20th c.)

Administration
- Archdiocese: Archdiocese of Esztergom–Budapest

The Church of Our Lady of the Snows (Hungarian: Havas Boldogasszony-templom or Krisztinavárosi plébániatemplom) is a Roman Catholic parish church located in the Krisztinaváros neighborhood of Budapest, Hungary. It belongs to the Archdiocese of Esztergom–Budapest and stands on Krisztina tér in District I, on the Buda side of the city.

== History ==
The origins of the church date back to the late 17th century. Around 1694, a local chimney sweep named Péter Pál Francin, who owned a vineyard in the area, built a small chapel in gratitude for surviving a plague epidemic. The chapel was dedicated to the Virgin Mary and contained a copy of a “bleeding Madonna” image from Re, Piedmont. Because of this, it became known locally as the Vérkápolna (“Blood Chapel”).

The chapel was destroyed in a fire in 1723, though the image survived. As the Krisztinaváros district grew during the 18th century, plans were made to build a larger church. Construction of the present structure began in 1795, with the foundation stone laid on 13 September of that year. The church was completed around 1797, designed in the late Baroque, or Zopfstil, style. Architect Kristóf Hikisch is credited with the design.

During its early history, the church was served by various religious orders, including the Carmelites and later the Franciscans. It became a parish church under diocesan administration in the 19th century.

== Architecture ==
The Church of Our Lady of the Snows is a single-nave, late Baroque building with a modest façade and a square tower. The late 18th century structure was repaired and altered in the 1850s under the guidance of József Hild. The tower’s original tent-shaped roof was replaced in 1883 with the present dome and lantern. The interior features late Baroque and early Neoclassical elements, including frescoes and altarpieces added during the 19th century.

== Cultural significance ==
The church has long been a center of community life in Krisztinaváros and has hosted several events of national note. The statesman István Széchenyi and the physician Ignaz Semmelweis were both married here, and the physicist Loránd Eötvös was baptized in the parish. Over time, the church has served as a focal point for local Catholic life and civic gatherings. The parish feast day is celebrated on 5 August, coinciding with the Feast of Our Lady of the Snows.
