= Krisztinaváros =

Neighborhood in Budapest, Hungary

Coordinates: 47°29′48″N 19°1′55″E

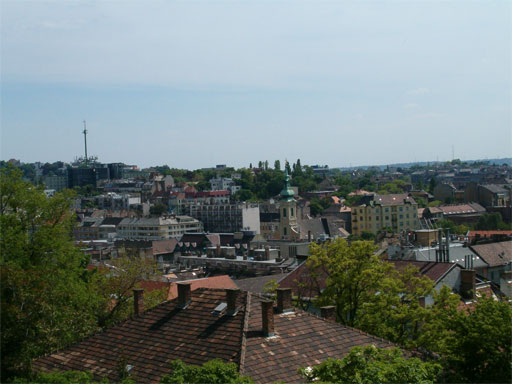
Church around 2000, view from Castle Hill

Krisztinaváros (English: Krisztina town) (German: Christinenstadt) is a neighborhood in central Budapest, situated just west of Castle Hill, north of Tabán. It is named after Archduchess Maria Christina, daughter of Maria Theresa, who interceded for buildings to be erected in this area. The history of Krisztinaváros is inseparable from that of the neighboring old Tabán, Naphegy and Gellérthegy.

The central features are Krisztina tér and the entrance to the Castle Hill tunnel. It is also home to the Tabán Cinema, a small cinema that presents art films and documentaries. (Despite its name, this cinema belongs to Krisztinaváros, not Tabán.)

== Sights ==
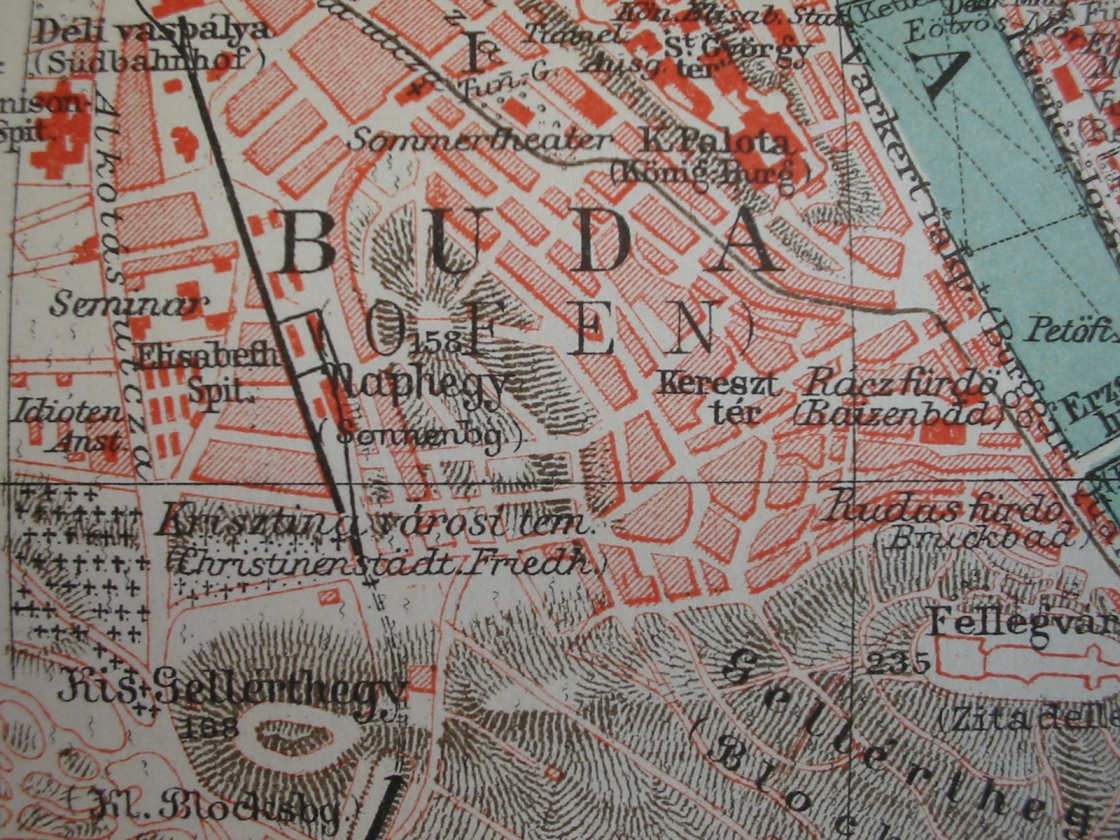
A historical map of the area. Krisztinaváros 1905, old Krisztinaváros Cemetery, today an old chesnut-park (Gesztenyés), hotel and modern technology center (Mom park)

=== Monuments ===
- Krisztina Tér Church
- Gesztenyéskert, a huge park with chestnut trees, previously the old Krisztinaváros Cemetery
- Mom park, with modern office buildings and Novotel Szálló (Hotel Novotel).

=== Historical cafés and restaurants ===
- Philadelphia Kávéház

== Notable residents ==
- Dezső Szabó, author
- Géza Ottlik, writer
- Sándor Márai, Hungarian writer and journalist.
- Vilmos Aba-Novák, painter

== Gallery ==
Statue of Sándor Márai
in Budapest Mikó utca, Krisztinaváros

Márai's memorial on his former home in Krisztinaváros

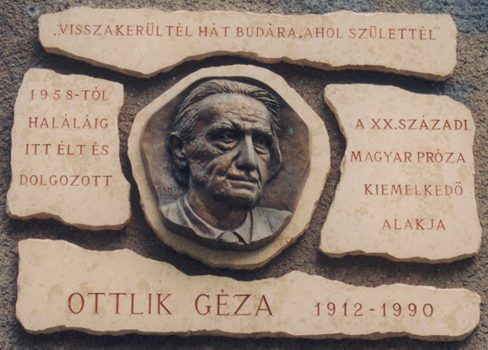
Géza Ottlik

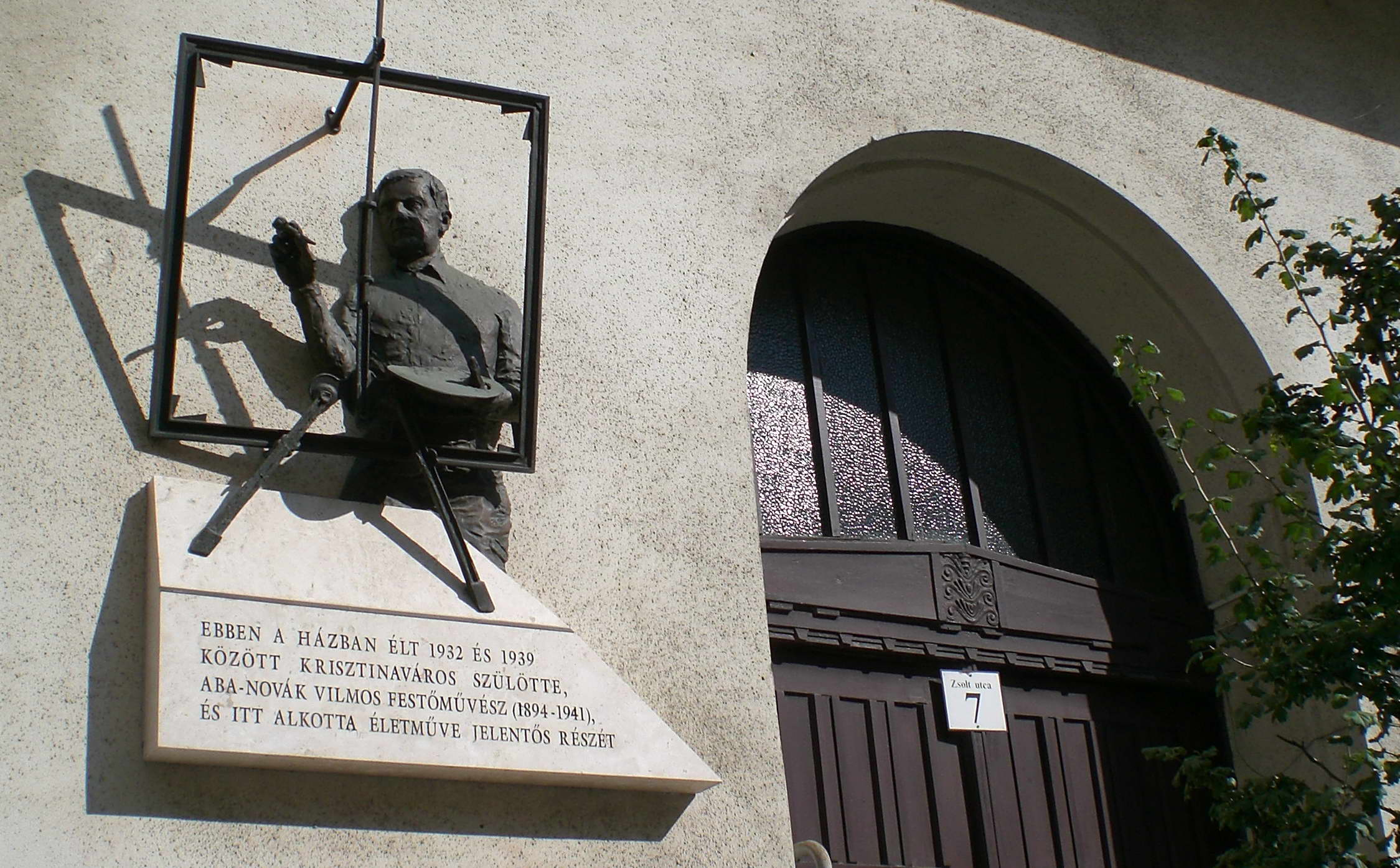
Vilmos Aba-Novák

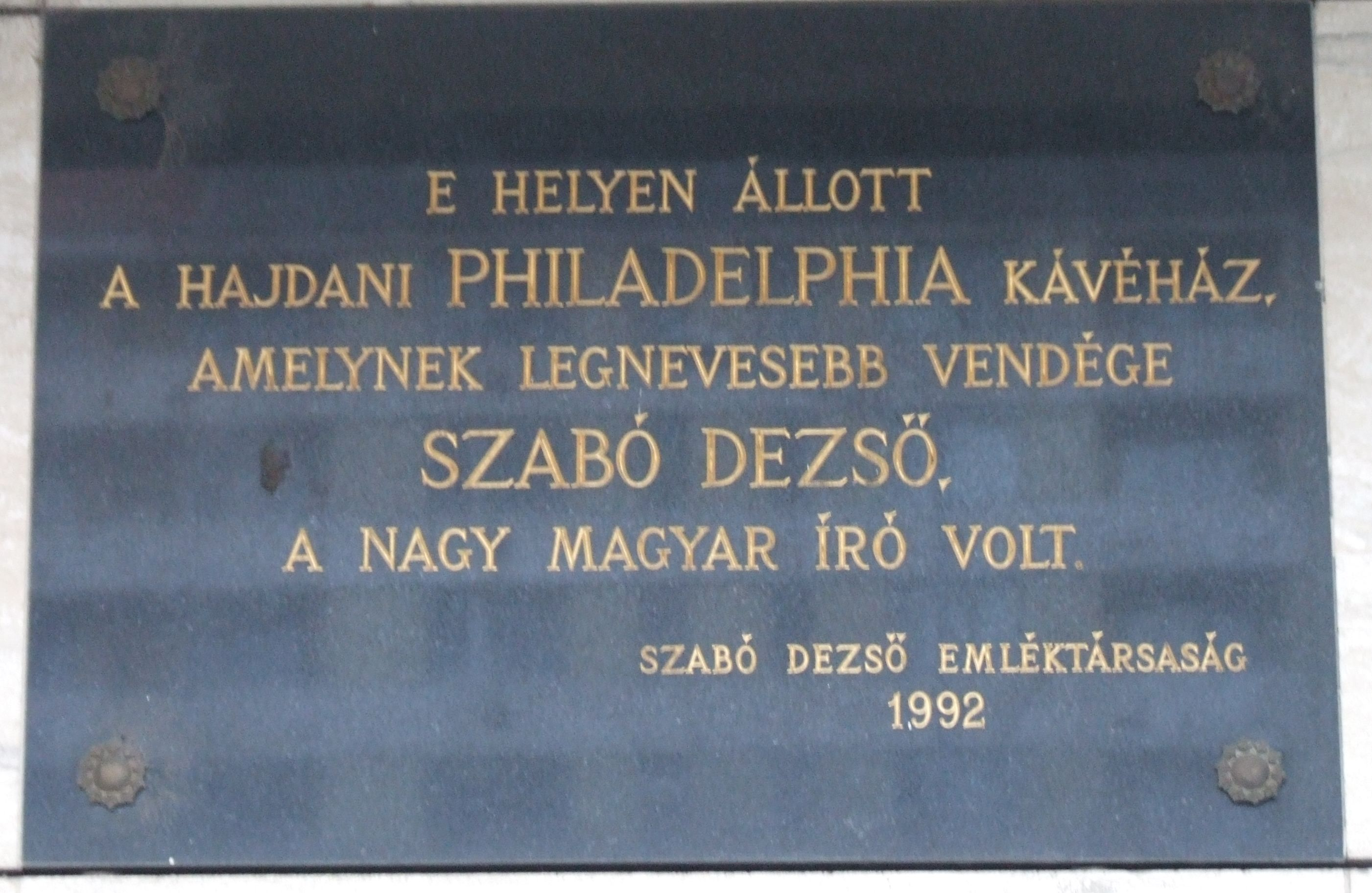
Dezső Szabó

== See also ==
- Tabán
- Krisztina Téri Iskola
- Naphegy
