= Krisztina Téri Iskola =

Coordinates: 47°29′50″N 19°1′52″E

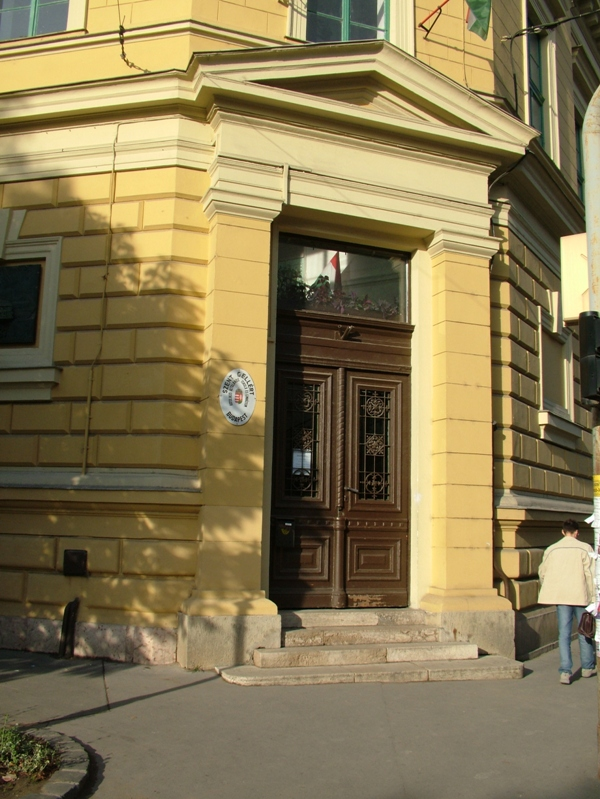
Szent Gellért Katolikus Általános Iskola és Gimnázium

Krisztina Téri Iskola (Krisztina Square School) is a school in the Krisztinaváros district of Budapest, Hungary, established in 1787.

The first school building was a pub building on the site of what is now 1–3 Gellérthegy Street. The school operated from this building until 1810, when it moved into premises at 63. Krisztina Boulevard. In 1883, the school moved to its current premises.

== Gallery ==
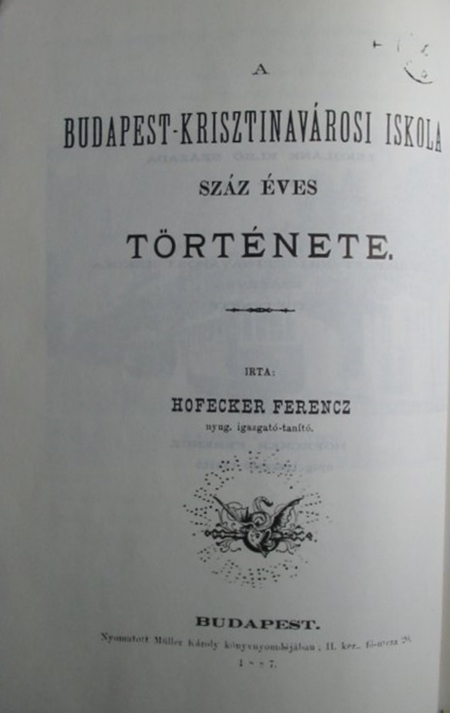
100 years anniversary 1887 (Hungarian)

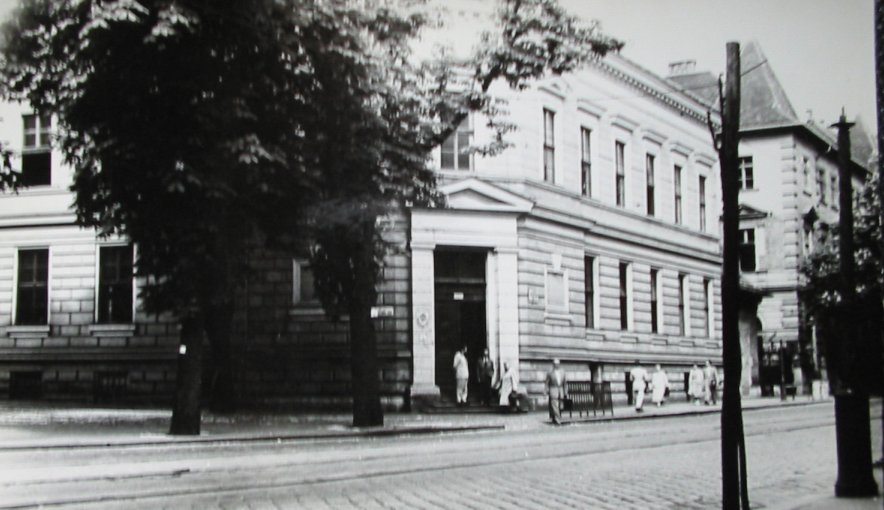
around 1958

200 years anniversary 1987 (Hungarian)

Krisztina Téri Iskola soccer team on Margaret Island in 1955

== Literature ==
- Hofecker Ferencz 1887, Budapest Krisztinavárosi Iskola Százéves Története (120 years old book, Hungarian)
- Emlékkönyv a 200. éves èvfordulóra 1787 - 1987, Ákosné Jobb Mária igazgató (Hungarian)
