= Vigadó of Pest =

Concert hall in Pest, Budapest, Hungary

Coordinates: 47°29′45.22″N 19°2′58.04″E

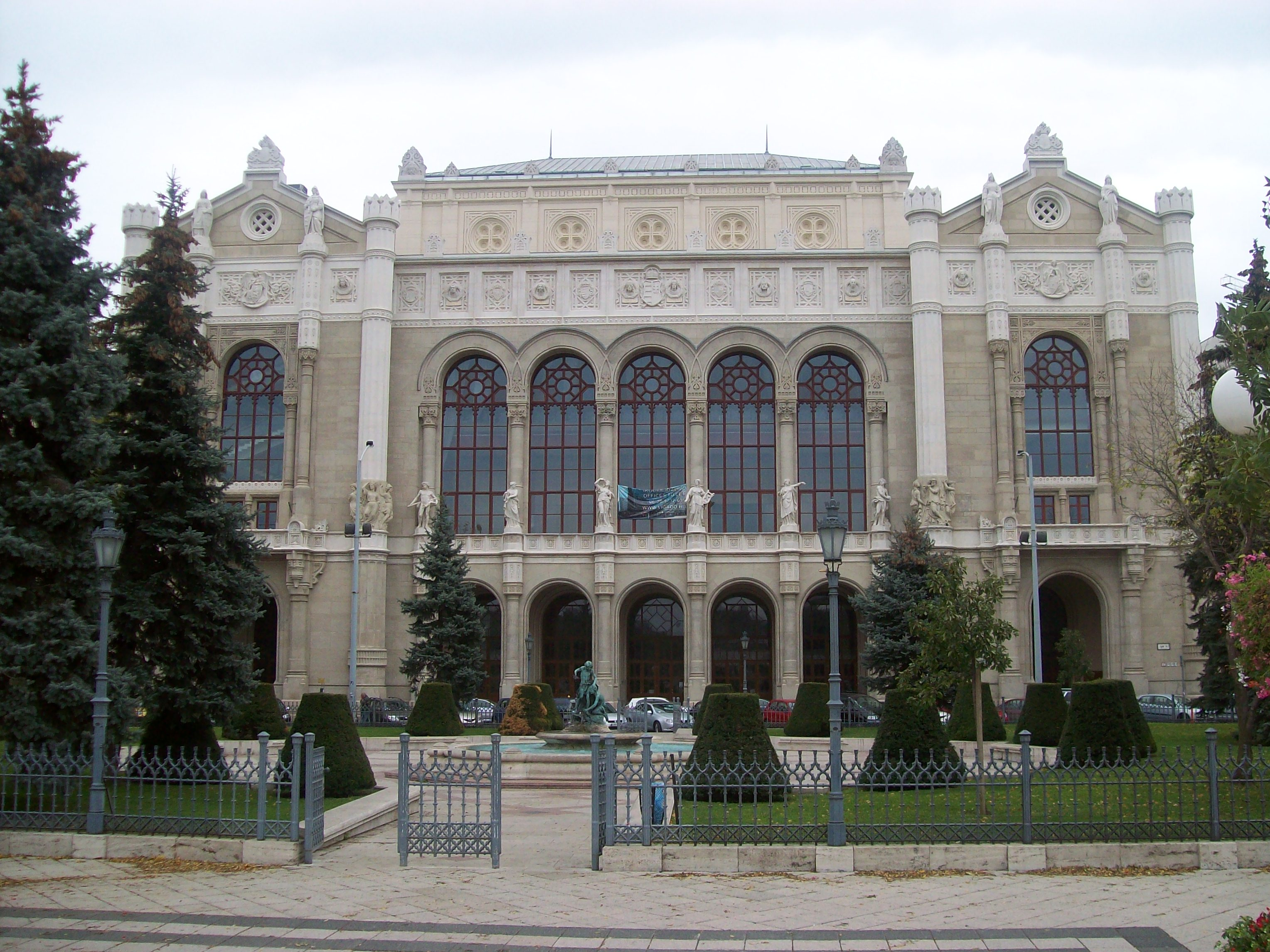

Vigadó (usually translated as "Place for Merriment") is Budapest's second largest concert hall, located on the Eastern bank of the Danube in Budapest, Hungary.

The building itself, designed by Frigyes Feszl in 1859. Built to replace another concert hall on the same site (which was destroyed by fire in the 1848 War of Independence) Feszl's Vigadó was also badly damaged, this time during World War II. The post-war reconstruction, which took some thirty-six years to complete, remains faithful to his original design and continues to attract leading conductors and performers from around the world. The facade of the Vigadó was cleaned and restored in 2006.

The Budai Vigadó is the home stage of the Hungarian State Folk Ensemble (The House of Traditions), the group having started in 1951 with Hungarian traditional dance and music. The group consists of 30 dancers, a Gypsy band of 14, and a 5-member folk band.

== See also ==
- List of concert halls
