= Tabán =

Coordinates: 47°29′30″N 19°2′19″E

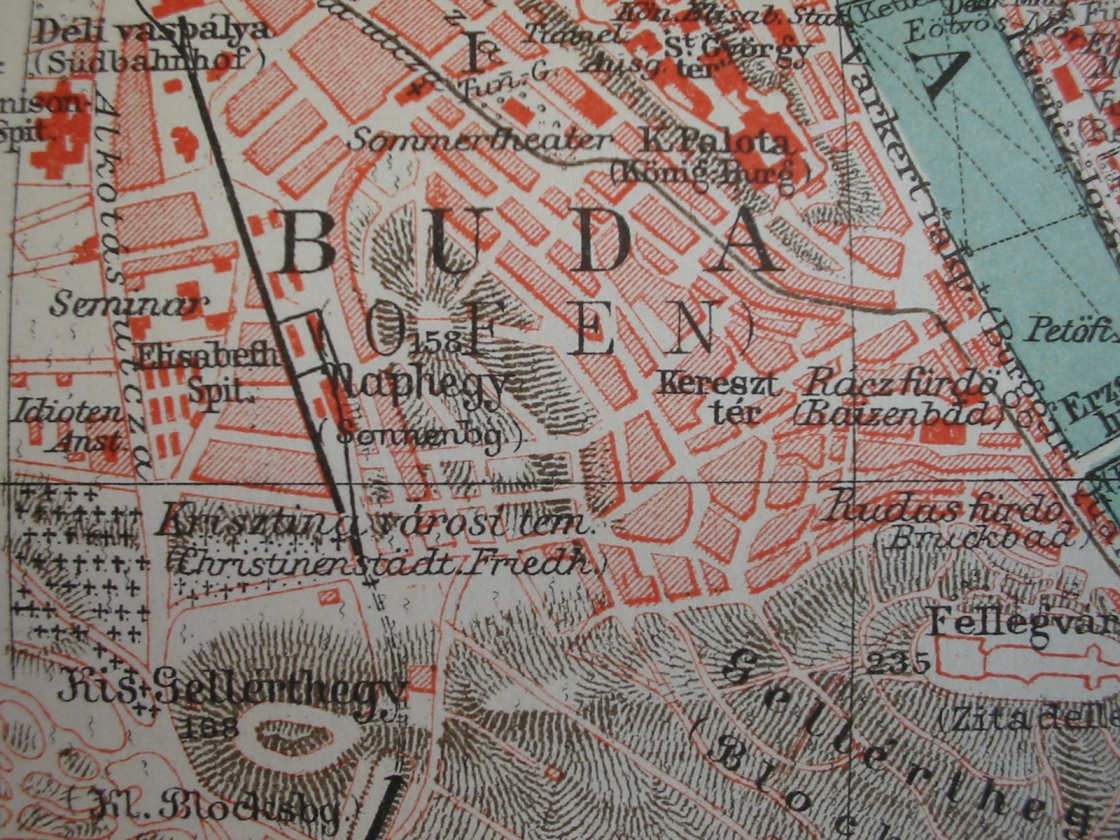
Naphegy and Tabán in Budapest. Meyers Lexikon (1905)

The Tabán usually refers to an area within the 1st district of Budapest, the capital of Hungary. It lies on the Buda (i.e., western) side of the Danube, to the south of György Dózsa Square, on the northern side of Elisabeth Bridge and to the east of Naphegy. Several other Hungarian cities and towns also have districts called Tabán.

== History ==
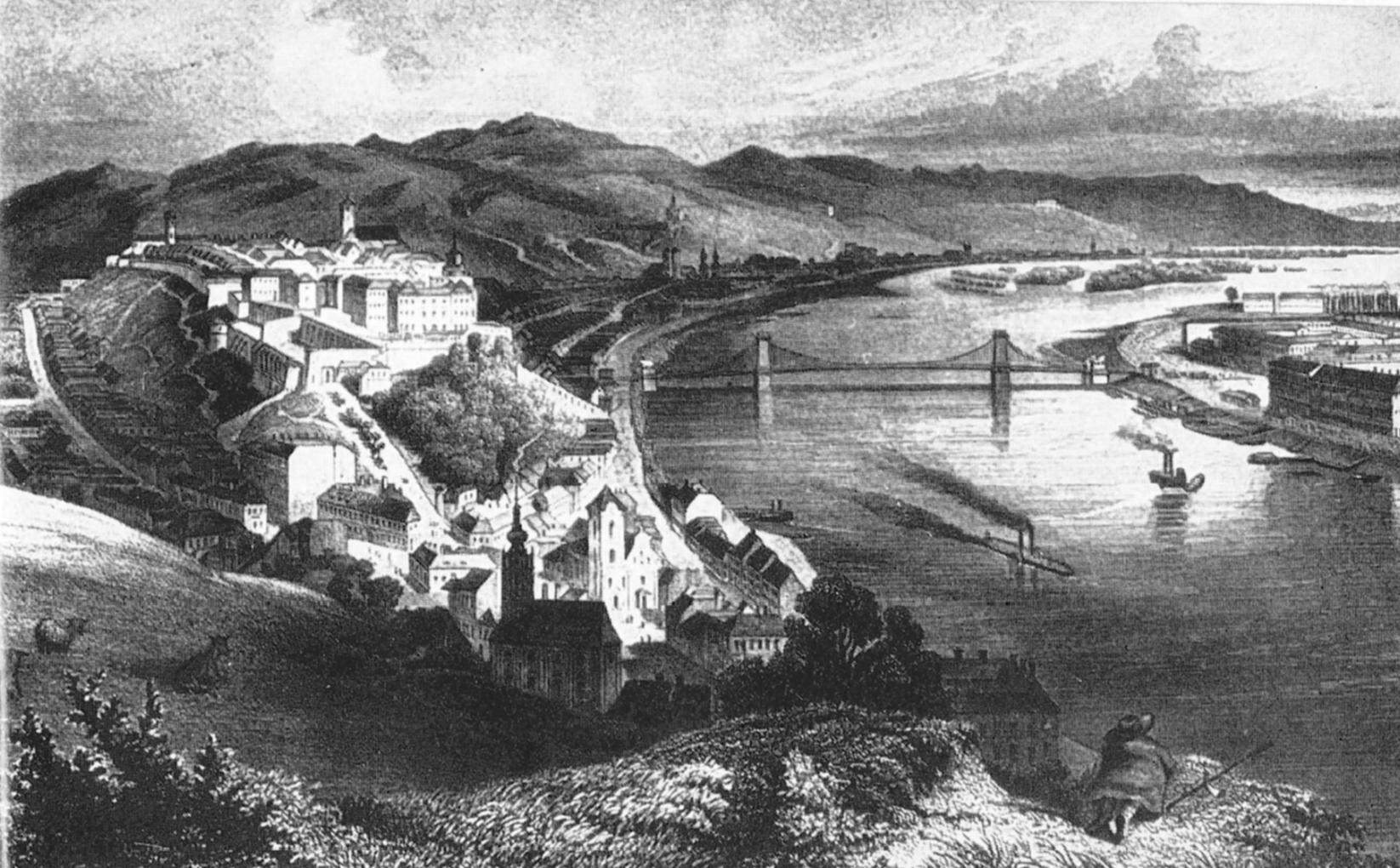
Tabán mid-1800s

The Tabán has been inhabited since Neolithic times due to its location in a protected valley, the thermal waters at the bottom of the Gellért Hill, and the ford over the Danube. In the Iron Age, it was inhabited by a tribe of Celts, who were replaced by the Romans in the 1st century BC.

In the Middle Ages, the Tabán was a village under Buda Castle. Remains of significant medieval structures were discovered by archaeologists in 1936, and the 12th-century relief of the Tabán Christ might have belonged to a church located in the area. During the Ottoman occupation of Hungary, the Turks developed the thermal medicinal baths in the area and brought in settlers from the Balkans. The population increased after the 1686 liberation of Buda from as refugees arrived from Greece, Bosnia and Serbia. The Franciscans from Bosnia established the Tabán parish Church of St. Catherine of Alexandria in the 17th century; the church was rebuilt in Baroque style between 1728 and 1777 and reconstructed several times. The Serbian Orthodox inhabitants established their own parish. The Church of St. Demetrius was built in 1742-51 in Baroque style; it was the largest church building in the Metropolitanate of Karlovci. In the 18th century, the town was inhabited by Serbs, Greeks, Vlachs, Germans, Croats, Slovaks and Gypsies.

By the 19th century, the Tabán became known as a bohemian quarter of Budapest with many restaurants, bars and bordellos. Its narrow streets on the hillsides echoed a Mediterranean atmosphere. Kereszt Street was at the center of this district.

In the 1930s, the Tabán was demolished as part of a project of urban renewal in Budapest. Today, it is a popular park.

== Topography ==
After the 1930 urban planning in Budapest, only a few old Tabán houses were left in the Naphegy district; one of them was the Tabán school, which was destroyed in January 1945, during the battle of Budapest. Today a sports field can be found where the school once stood. The original streets remaining are Orom Street in Gellérthegy and Tabán Czakó Street in Naphegy.

Taban's historic and cultural attractions include a Memorial of the 1956 Hungarian Revolution near Naphegy Street and Kereszt Street and the Semmelweiss Orvostörténeti Múzeum near Apród Street.

== Tabán in literature ==
The poet Dezső Kosztolányi wrote:

"Köröttem - esős akvarell - Tabán.
Nyugodt lennék itt s boldog is talán..."

"I crossed Tabán - a rainy watercolour.
I would be at peace here and maybe happy too..."

== Sights ==
Major sights include

- Rác Thermal Bath
- Rudas Baths
- Semmelweis Museum of Medical History
- Tabán ruins

== Gallery ==
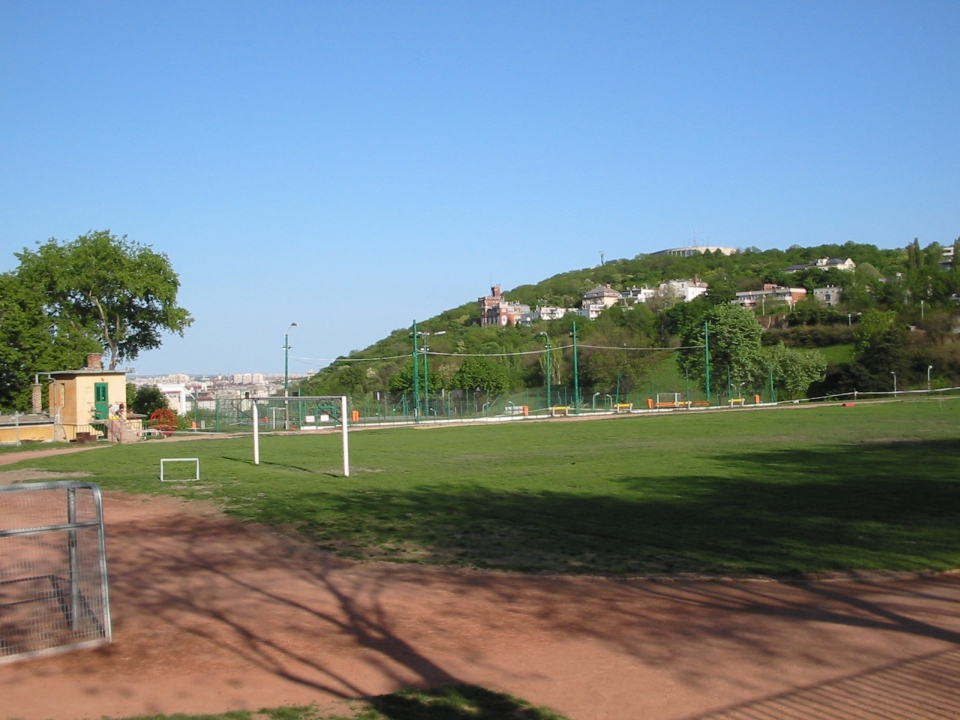
The old Tabán school was here, today sports field Naphegy near Czakó Street, Tabán's historic places 1945 - 2003

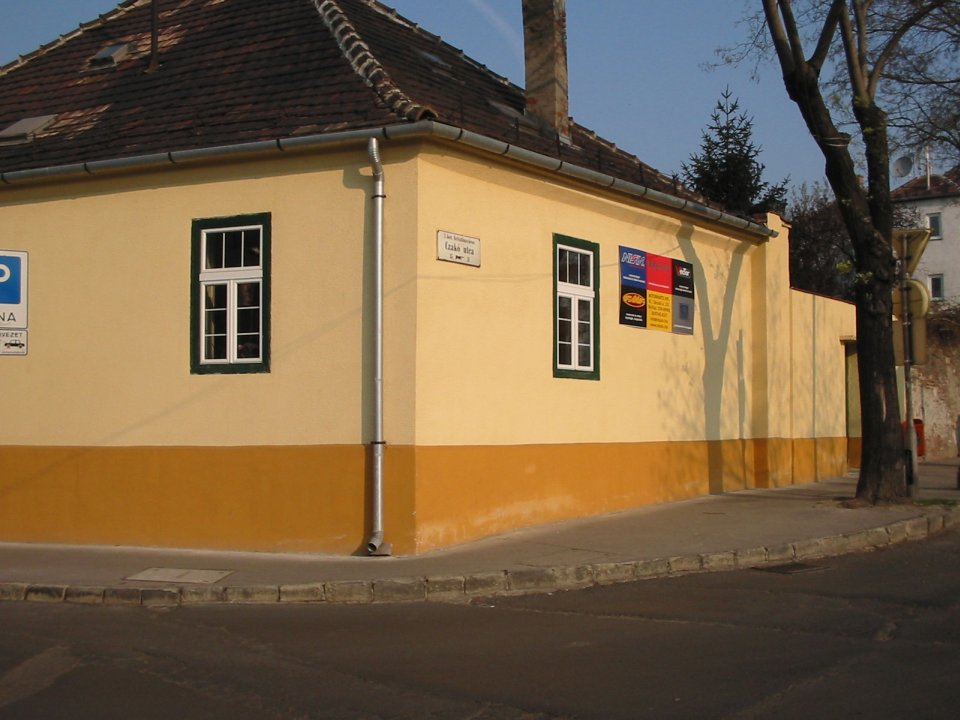
The last Tabán house; Czakó Street–Aladár Street in 2003, Tabán's historic places 1945 - 2003

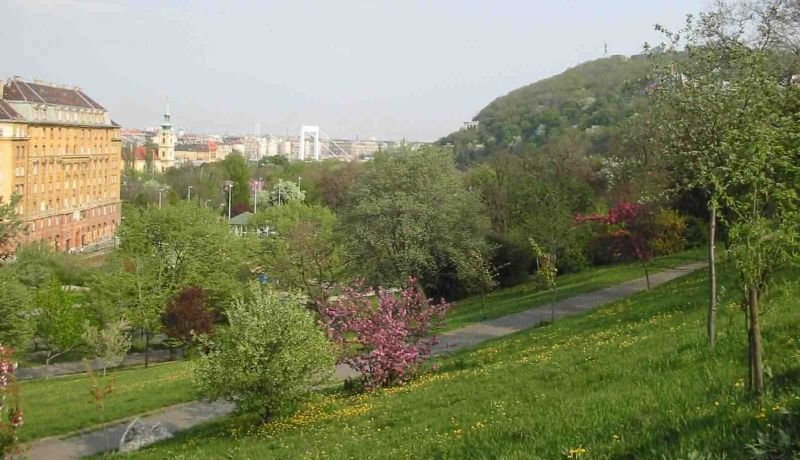
Tabán Springtime 2003, Tabán park today 2003 - 2004

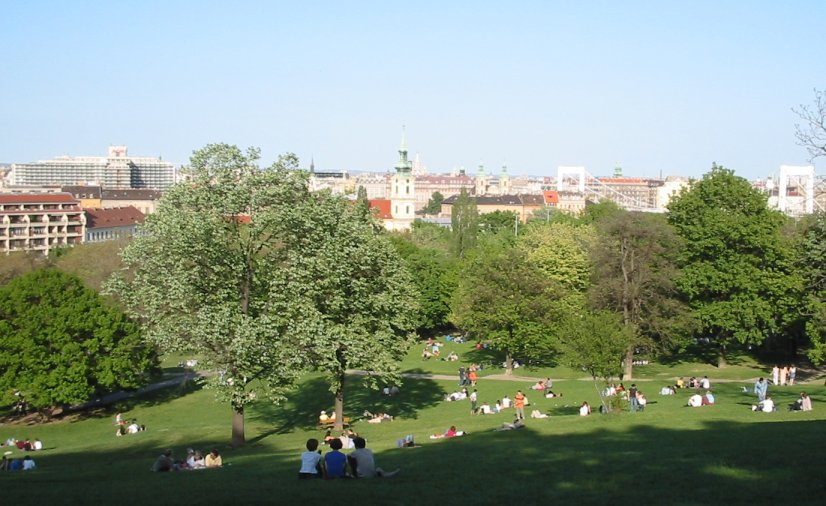
May 1. 2003, Tabán park today 2003 - 2004

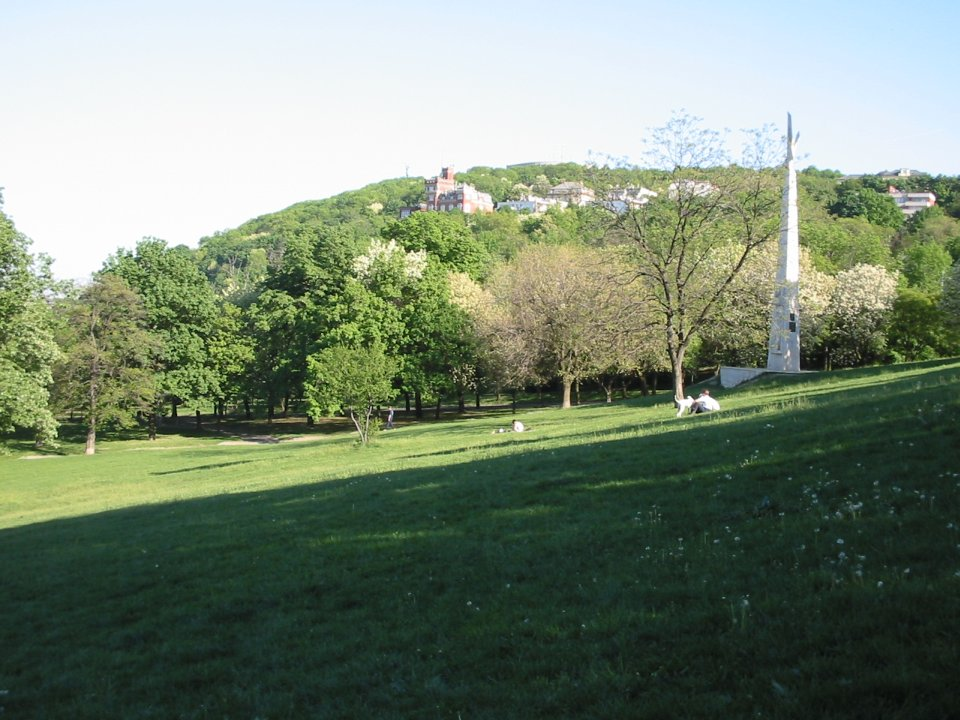
Memorial 1956 - 1956 Hungarian Revolution, Tabán park today 2003 - 2004

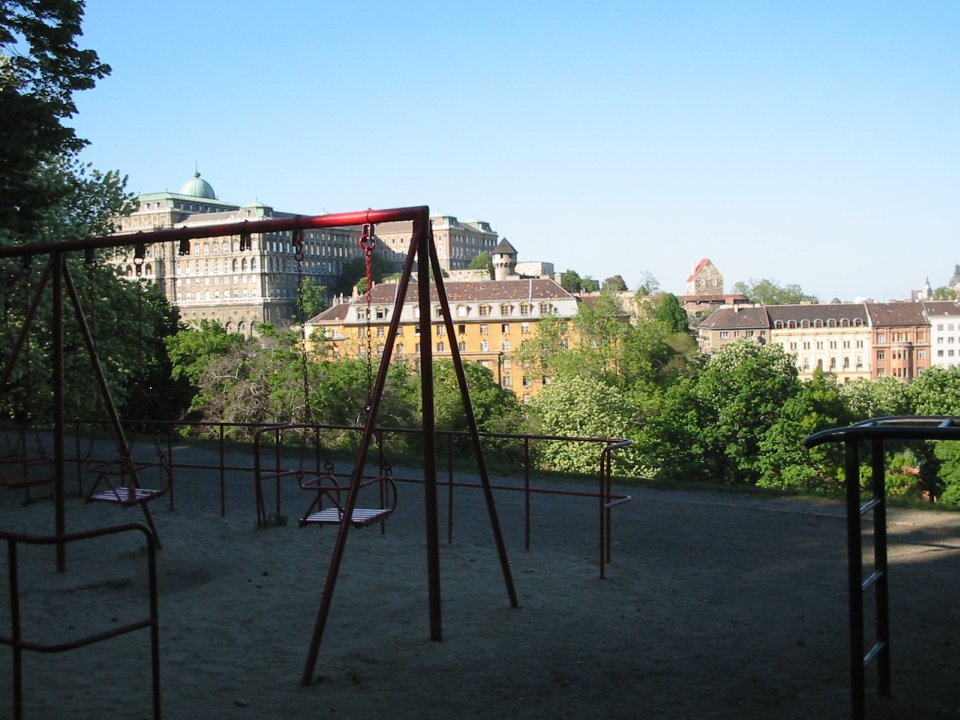
Playground, Naphegy utca - Hadnagy utca, Tabán park today 2003 - 2004

== Sources ==
- Budapest Lexikon (Second edition, revised and expanded). 2 volumes. Akadémiai Kiadó, Budapest, 1993.
- Narodni Kalendar 1990, Aqua Kiadó és Nyomda, Budapest, 1990.
- Antal Szerb: Budapesti kalauz Marslakók számára (A Guide to Budapest for Martians)

== See also ==
The following are near Tabán:

- Gellert Hill
- Naphegy
- Krisztinaváros
- Buda Castle
