= St. Catherine of Alexandria Church, Budapest =

Saint Catherine of Alexandria Church
- Hungarian: Alexandriai Szent Katalin-templom; German: Pfarrkirche zur heiligen Katharina
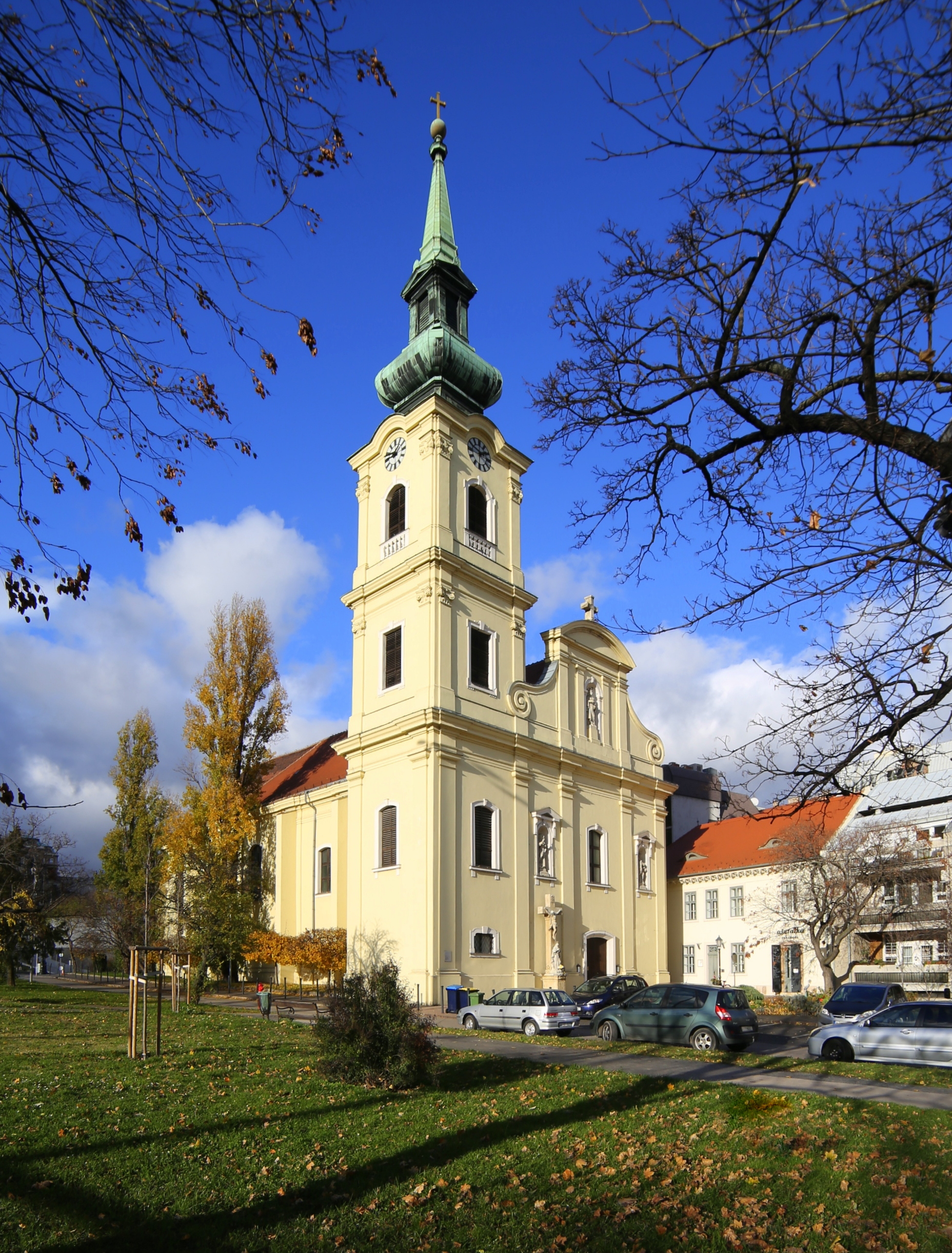
- The façade of the church
- Saint Catherine of Alexandria Church
- 47.49222°N 19.043955°E
- Location: 11 Attila út, Tabán, Várkerület district, Budapest
- Country: Hungary
- Denomination: Roman Catholic
- Tradition: Latin

History
- Status: Parish church (1702)
- Founded: 1692
- Founder: Cameral Administration of Buda
- Dedication: Saint Catherine of Alexandria

Architecture
- Functional status: Active
- Heritage designation: listed
- Designated: 1936
- Architect(s): Christian Obergruber, Matthäus Nepauer, Engineering Office of the Municipality
- Architectural type: Single-nave church
- Style: Central European Baroque
- Years built: 1728-1736, 1750-1753, 1765-1777, 1880-1881, 1959-1960
- Groundbreaking: 1728
- Completed: 1777

Specifications
- Materials: stone and brick

Administration
- Diocese: Roman Catholic Archdiocese of Esztergom–Budapest
- Deanery: Buda-Középső
- Parish: Tabán Parish

Clergy
- Priest: Balázs Hegyi

The St. Catherine of Alexandria Church (Hungarian: Alexandriai Szent Katalin-templom, German: Pfarrkirche zur heiligen Katharina) is a Roman Catholic church in the Tabán quarter of Budapest, Hungary. It is the parish church of the Tabán Parish which also comprises parts of Gellért Hill and Naphegy. The church is a listed monument that was built in Central European Baroque style between 1728 and 1777. It was reconstructed several times in the 19th–20th centuries.

== History ==
=== Early history ===
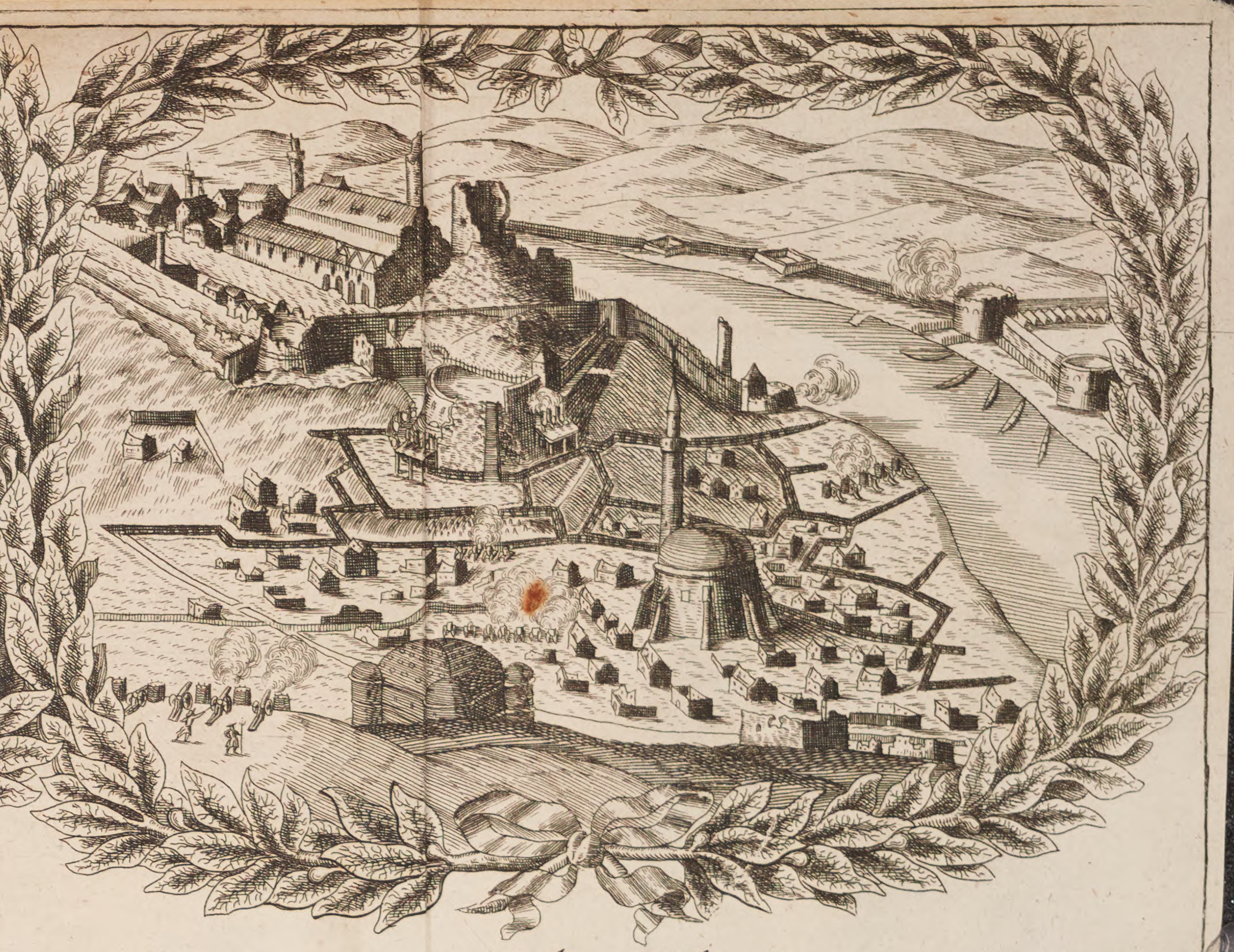
The Lower Town of Buda with the Mosque of Sokollu Mustafa Pasha in 1686. Engraving from Boethius' Kriegs-Helm.

The southern part of the Lower Town between Castle Hill and Gellért Hill was devastated by the Siege of Buda in 1686. The area had few inhabitants until November 1690 when a group of South Slavic refugees were resettled there by the Cameral Administration. The majority of the new arrivals were Orthodox Serbs who built their own quarter on the banks of the Ördög-árok stream. Their chapel later became the Cathedral of the Holy Trinity. The Roman Catholics settled on the southern slopes of Castle Hill and near the Danube around the mosque of the Ottoman governor (beylerbey) Sokollu Mustafa Pasha (1566-1578) which survived the war.

In 1689 the head of the Cameral Administration of Buda, Johann Stephan Werlein asked the Franciscans of Bosna Argentina, who had a house in the Víziváros district, to take on the pastoral care of the Catholic Slavs who lived in the area. The Franciscan fathers already had a presence in Buda during the Ottoman period, and they spoke the Illyric language. The mosque of Sokollu Mustafa Pasha was converted to a chapel in 1692 and it was consecrated to St. Catherine of Alexandria. A house was built by the chapel for the friar who settled there in 1693. The friar also served as a schoolmaster because the Franciscans built a school on the edge of the cemetery which had been established around the chapel. This small stone building had a single room, and a few shops provided income for its maintenance. The Cameral Administration has granted approval to finish the construction of these shops on 31 May 1697.

The medieval parish was re-established in 1702, and its patron became the Council of Buda according to the 1703 letter of privilege of the town. The guardian of the Víziváros friary served as parish priest but actual pastoral care was entrusted to a Franciscan administrator who lived in the Tabán district. The baptismal register was started in 1692, marriage and burial records have been kept from 1709. In 1706 the council granted a 2.3 ha vineyard on Gellért Hill to the parish.

A drawing from 1721 documented the Baroque reconstruction of the converted mosque. The original dome was replaced by a steep conical roof, the upper part of the minaret was demolished to the height of the main building and the remaining part was topped with a belfry and an ornate spire. A porch was built in front of the entrance door. The chapel had four bells: two older ones and two new bells that were cast in 1723 by Jacob Nosbicher, a bellmaker in Pest. The new bells were dedicated to Apostles Matthias and Thomas, and the Virgin Mary.

=== The Baroque church ===
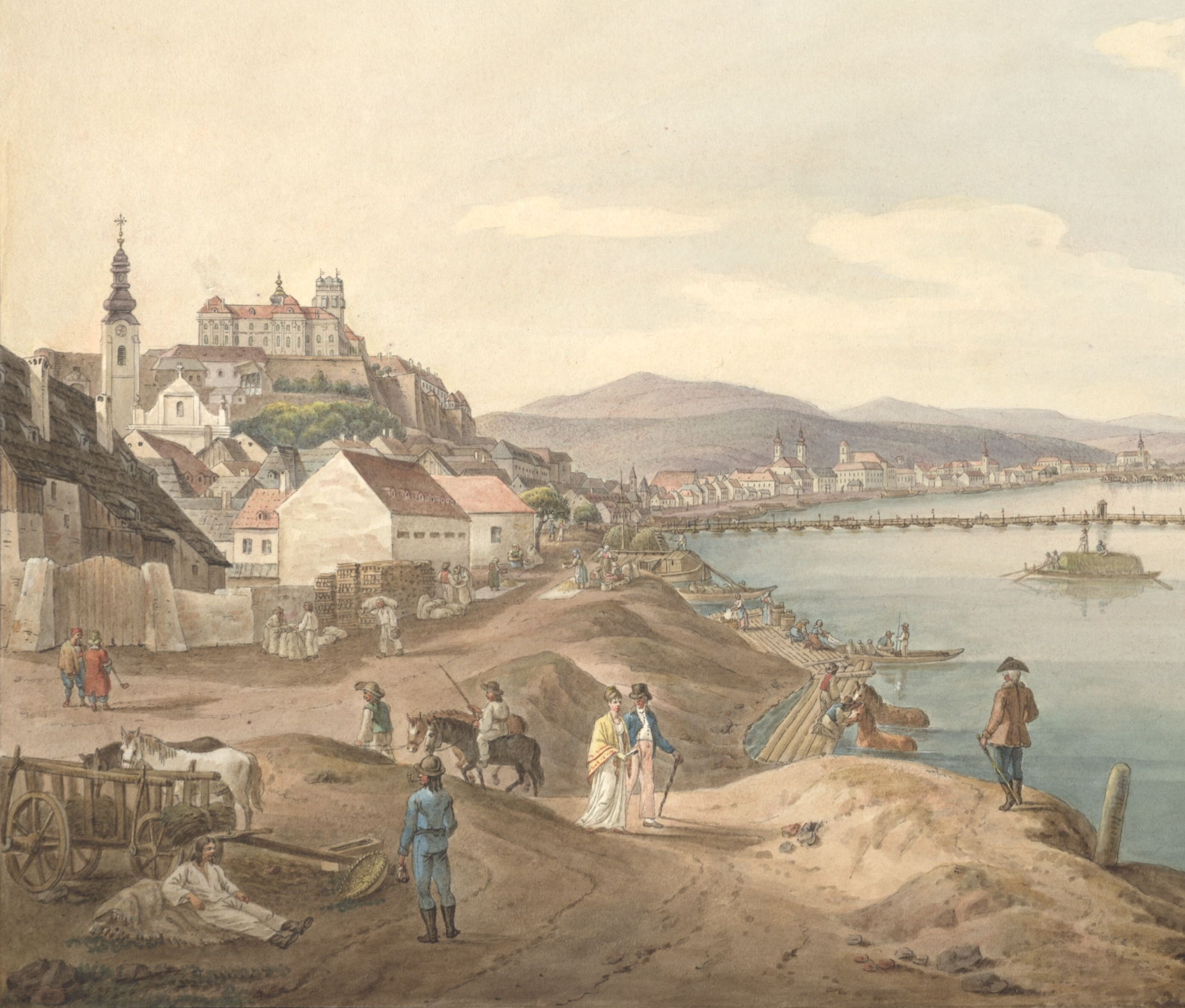
The church of Saint Catherine in 1810 with the ornate Baroque spire before the Great Fire. Detail of a view by Franz Jaschke.

Tabán quickly became the most densely populated quarter of Buda in the first decades of the 18th century in spite of the several natural disasters and epidemics that hit the district. The number and percentage of the Catholic population also increased. In 1702 there were only 250 Catholics among the taxpayer heads of families (the Orthodox Serbs numbered 461) but the canonical visitation in 1756 found more than 4000 Catholics in Tabán. Their number grew to almost 5000 in 1802. At first almost all of them were Illyrs (South Slavs) but German immigrants arrived in large numbers from the 1720s. In 1783 the Germans already outnumbered the Illyrs while the Hungarians and the Slovaks were still few in numbers. From the middle of the 18th century sermons were delivered in German and Illyric, and teaching in the parish school was also bilingual.

The Franciscan presence in the district also increased as one more friar settled in the small Tabán parish house in 1732. The old house was replaced by a more spacious building next to the church in 1759. The six room house was large enough to accommodate three friars from 1770 on. A new schoolhouse was bought in 1756 where secular schoolmasters taught. From 1757 the Franciscan house in the Víziváros district (and the friars of the Tabán parish) belonged to new Province of St. John Capistrano. The majority of the friars, who served the parish in the 18th century, were Illyrs (Croatians).

Between 1728 and 1736 the church was enlarged by Christian Obergruber, a master builder originally from Carinthia. A Baroque nave was added to the older part that was retained as the chancel. The main pieces of furnishings, including the pulpit and the altarpiece, were constructed in the 1740s. A crypt was built under the whole nave in 1749. The slow pace of the construction shows that the financial resources of the parish were limited, although several citizens had left donations for the church.

The next phase of the works began on 11 August 1750 and lasted until 1753. A new Baroque facade and a tower was built by Matthäus Nepauer, a masterbuilder originally from Vienna, who worked on several churches in Buda at the time. The tower had an ornate spire with a lantern, and the facade was decorated with volutes, two stone vases, a cross and the statues of Saint Catherine of Alexandria, Saint Andrew and Saint Peter. The stone parts were made by sculptor Anton Eberhardt and stonemason Johann Kugler. Four new bells were cast in 1755 by Anton Czeichner. The canonical visitation on 25 March 1756 described the rich Baroque furniture: a main altar with the painting of Saint Catherine and several statues, an ornate pulpit decorated with statues of the Evangelists, St. Francis and seven angels, and side altars dedicated to the Holy Trinity, the Immaculate Virgin Mary, St. Antony of Padua, St. Anne and the Holy Cross, all decorated with paintings and statues.

A further enlargement became necessary due to the rapid growth of the Roman Catholic population, and the old chancel – the converted Ottoman mosque – was demolished in 1765. The construction of a new section of the nave, the chancel and a two-storey sacristy on the western side was finished on 15 May 1777 when the cross was raised on the roof. The architect of the expansion was probably Matthäus Nepauer. Two new side altars were erected in the 1770s that were dedicated to St. Sebastian and St. Joseph, and a third one was dedicated to the Fourteen Holy Helpers in 1775. A new organ was built in 1797 by Wilhelm Hartmann, and a new main altar was erected between 1803 and 1806 (a work by stonemasons Franz Hofhauser and Antonio Allio, sculptor Friedrich Held and painters Josef Helm and Karl Josef Schöft). A new clock for the tower was made by Josef Hibling in 1808.

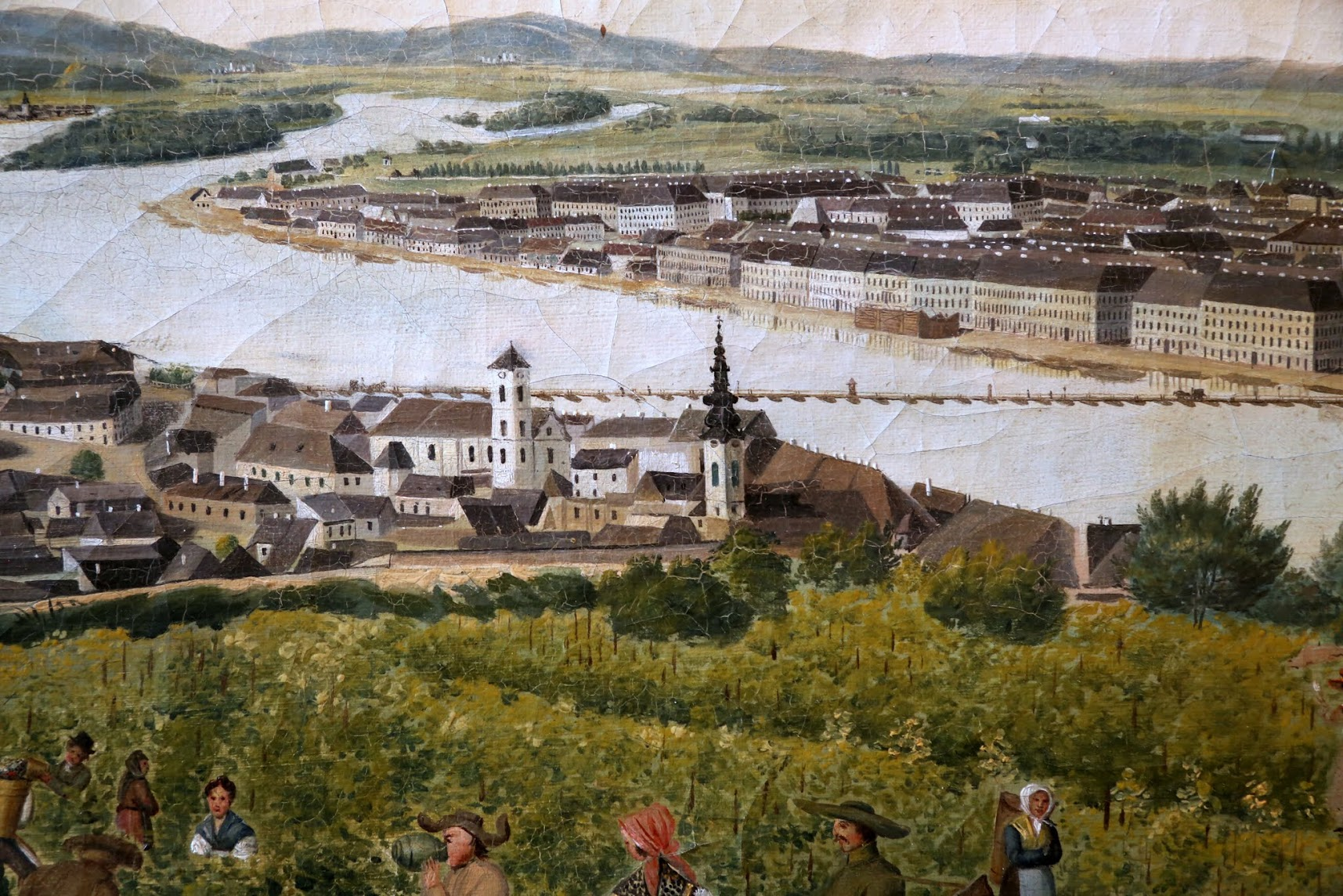
View of Tabán and Pest around 1830

=== 19th century reconstructions ===
The church burned down completely in the Great Tabán Fire of 1810 which destroyed the whole district. "The tower of the Catholic church in Rácváros caught fire after midnight yesterday, and collapsed horribly in the morning; the church itself also burned, illuminating this terrible night", a contemporary report claimed.

The reconstruction was begun by József Dankó the Elder in 1812 and it was finished by Ludwick Kimnach in 1818. Due to a shortage of funds, the ornate spire of the tower was replaced with a symple pyramidal roof in 1823. The interior and the new furniture was not finished until the 1830s. A new parish house was also built in 1818-19.

During the Hungarian War of Independence the church was damaged again when Buda was sieged by the Hungarian revolutionary army in May 1849, and Tabán was hit by artillery fire from Buda Castle. It was quickly repaired in the same year, the chancel was decorated with new frescoes and two altarpieces were added in 1850-51.

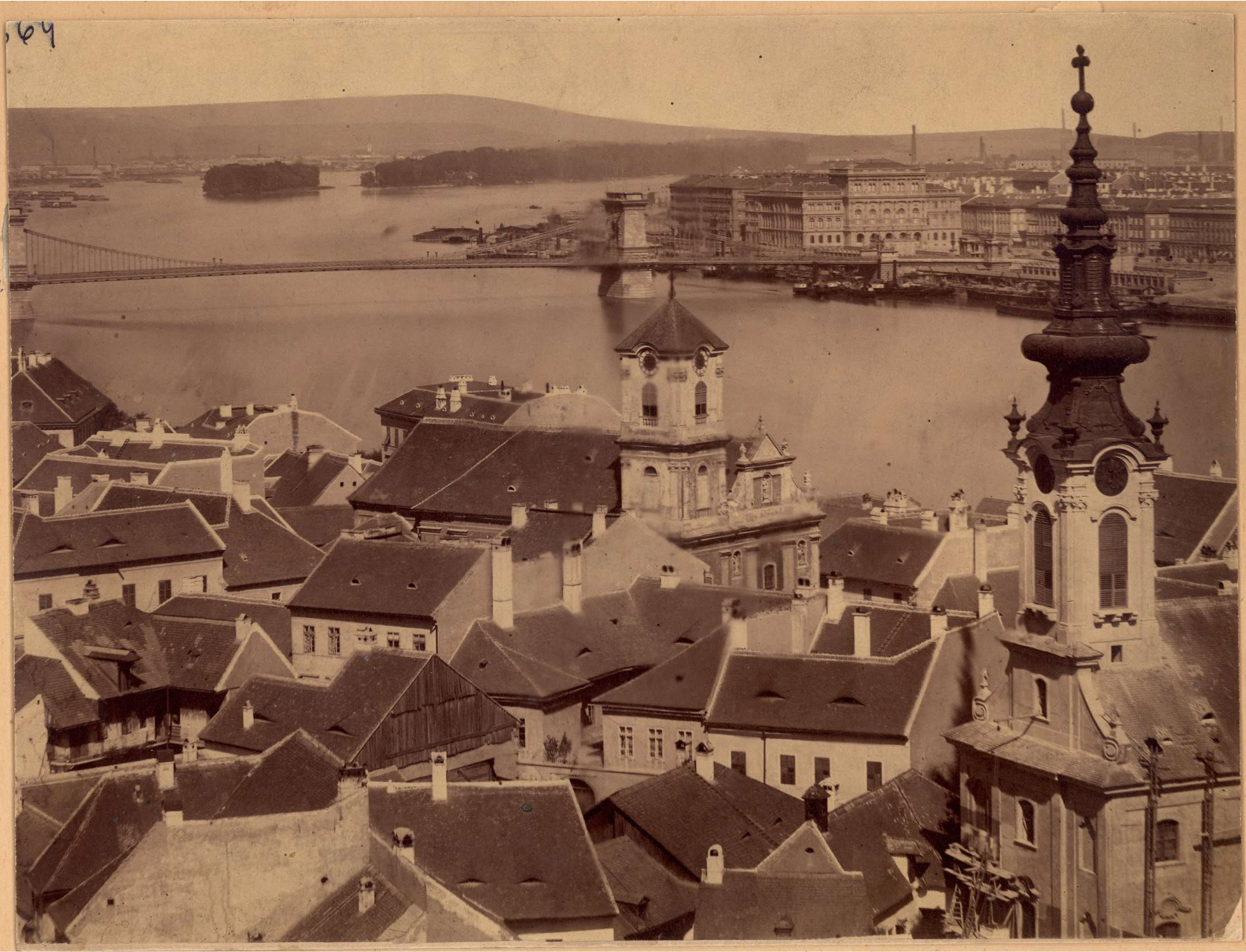
The Serbian Orthodox and the Roman Catholic churches of Tabán in the 1870s before their Neo-Baroque remodelling

The 232-year-long Franciscan administration of the parish ended with the death of the last administrator, Paskál Kostroschitz who served here from 1850 until 3 March 1868. In October 1868 the Council of Buda appointed a member of the secular clergy as parish priest although the Illyrs protested against the change, and still demanded a Slavic-speaking priest. Franciscan friars served as Croatian chaplains until 1887 but the gradual assimilation of the Illyr population made their further presence unnecessary. Sermons were delivered in Croatian until 1910, and singing in Illyric ceased four years later. Hungarian became the primary language of the Roman Catholic community of the district in the last decades of the 19th century.

At the time of the unification of Buda and Pest in 1873 the chancel and the northeastern side of the church was surrounded by a narrow churchyard, enclosed by the neighbouring houses, and there was a small square in front of the facade. The street which connected Szarvas tér and Templom tér was named Templom utcza or Kirchengasse (later the name was changed to Palota utcza, then Attila körút). The new patron, the Municipal Authority of Budapest built a large new parish house on Attila körút by the side of the church for 48.000 forints in Neo-Renaissance style in 1877.

The church was reconstructed in 1880-1881 by the Municipal Authority of Budapest: the facade was rebuilt in Neo-Baroque style, the shape of the pediment was changed and the facade was decorated with three statues by Gyula Szász. The simple pyramidal roof of the tower was replaced with an ornate copper spire. The porch in front of the entrance was rebuilt in Italianate style. The plans of the reconstruction were made by the Engineering Office of the Municipality. The interior was decorated with new frescos in the following years.

The surroundings of the church changed again when the new circular grand boulevard of Buda was created. The level of Szarvas tér was lowered in 1894, and the parish office building with the sacristy was demolished to make way for the new road which was named Attila körút. Although the Council of Budapest planned to build a new parish house, the project never came to fruition. A new sacristy was built on the west side of the church, and the parish office moved to different rented buildings nearby. The parish office was located at no. 6 Hadnagy utca from 1908 until 1938 when this building was also demolished due to urban redevelopment.

=== The church in the 20th century ===
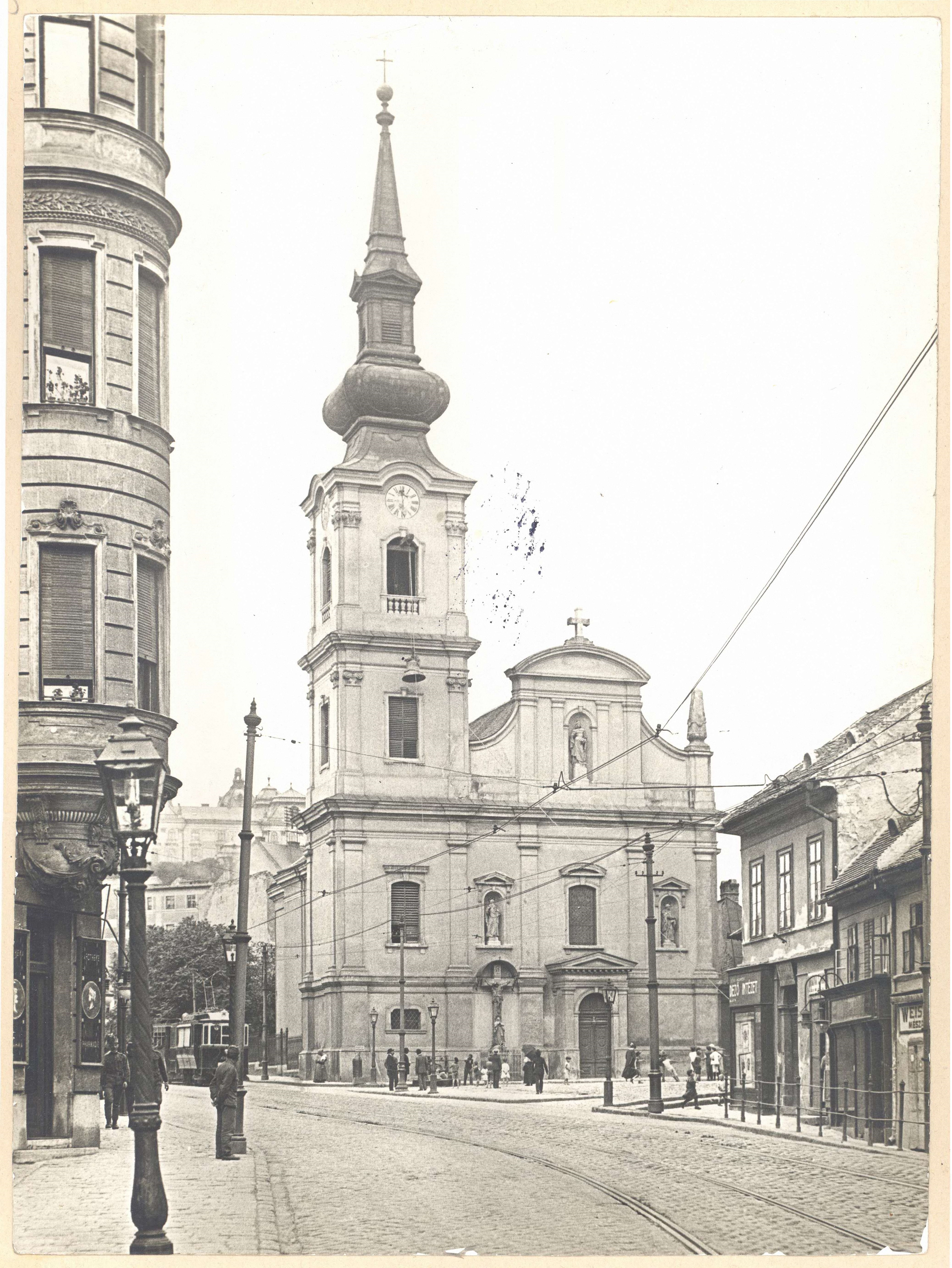
The requisition of the church bells in 1916

The interior of the church was renovated again in the early 1910s. During the First World War the bells of the churches in Budapest were requisitioned by the Austro-Hungarian Army. Four larger bells from the 18th century were removed from the tower and taken away to be melted for military uses in 1916. Only the two small bells were retained.

The parishes of Budapest were reorganized in 1922 to better suit the needs of the population which had been growing rapidly in the previous decades. The ancient Tabán parish was reduced to its core area, and lost a large part lying to the south of Gellért Hill. The districts of Kelenföld and Lágymányos were originally sparsely populated but the urbanization of the area made necessary to establish an independent parish because the majority of the parishioners already lived there. The Tabán parish was compensated with a small area that was detached from the Krisztinaváros parish but overall its population decreased from 27'568 (in 1920) to 6772. The reduced parish covered the Tabán area, the northern slopes of Gellért Hill, the southern part of Naphegy and the hilly neighbourhoods around Sas-hegy. The territory of the Tabán parish was further reduced when the new Farkasréti parish was established in 1950.

Two new bells were installed in the tower on 29 November 1925; the larger one weighing 500 kg was dedicated to Saint Catherine, the smaller to Saint Joseph. The bells were made by László Szlezák, the most important Hungarian bell-founder at the time. They were mostly financed by donations collected by the Tabáni Oltáregyesület, a local charitable organization. The church was renovated by the municipality in 1928.

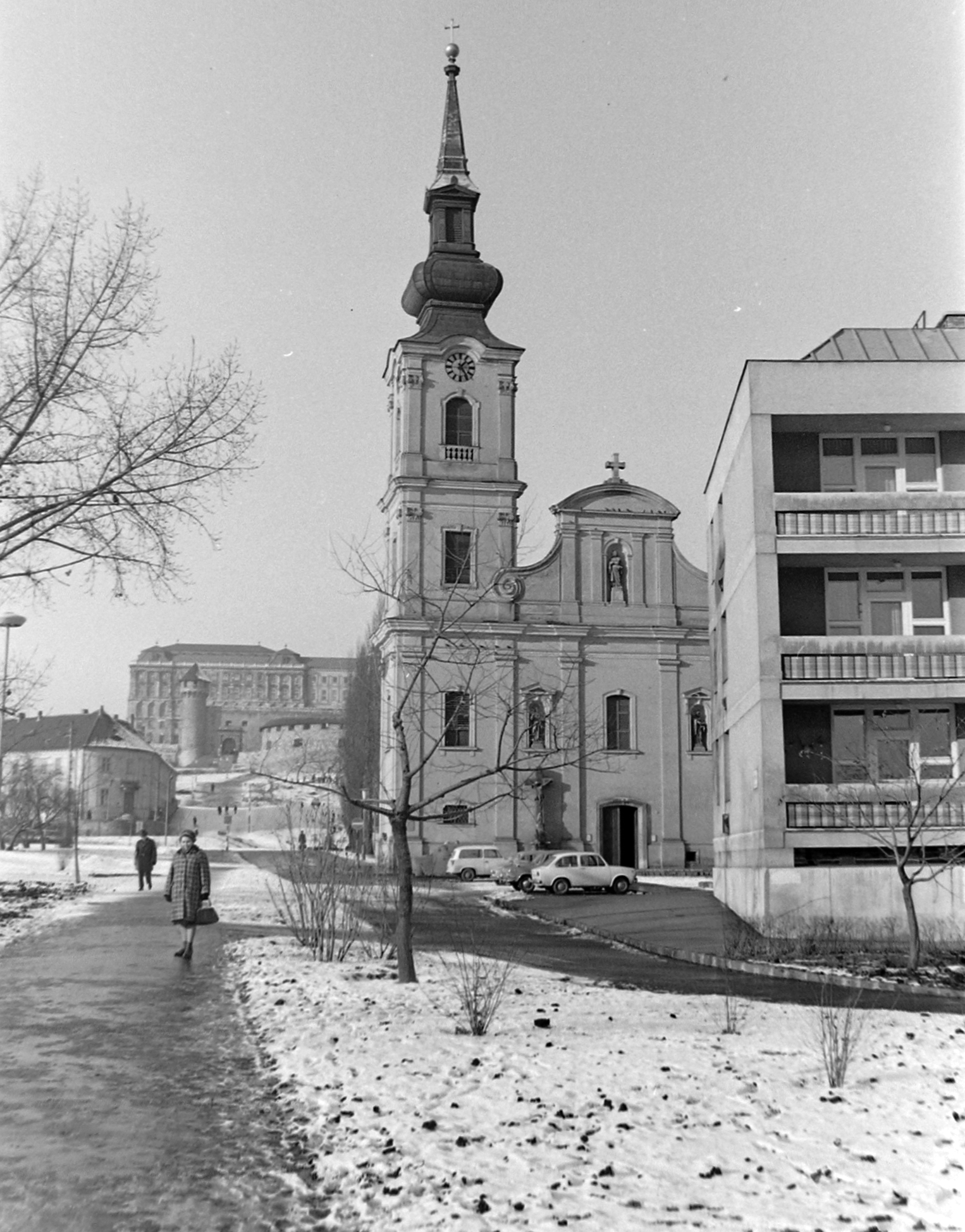
The reconstructed church in modern urban surroundings in 1967

Between 1933 and 1938 a large part of Tabán district was demolished by the municipality of Budapest. Only a small group of houses was preserved and the context of the church changed fundamentally as the dense urban grain of the historic neighbourhood was replaced by a new park and wide thoroughfares.

The building and its surroundings were seriously damaged in the siege of Budapest in 1944-45. A bomb hit the western side of the building; the roof, the spire and the obelisk of the pediment were destroyed, the liturgical furnishings and the altars were extensively damaged or lost. Repair work began in June 1945, and the church became functional again by the autumn, although the interior renovations went on in the following years. The renovation was still funded by the Municipal Authority of Budapest that remained the patron of the parish until 1950 when the right of patronage ceased to exist.

In 1948 the parish marked the 900th anniversary of its foundation together with the Pest Inner City parish. An open-air mass was celebrated by Cardinal József Mindszenty, the Archbishop of Esztergom on August 15 on Eskü tér (now Március 15. tér) where the relics of Saint Gerard were exposed on a temporary altar. In the following years expressions of religious faith and parish life were severely restricted by the Stalinist dictatorship.

The church suffered further damage during the Hungarian Revolution of 1956. In the following years serious structural problems became apparent with widening cracks on the side walls and the vaults, and the church was declared dangerous. In the course of a thorough reconstruction in 1959-1960, the building was fitted with a reinforced concrete frame structure and buttresses, the vaults were strengthened, the main facade was simplified and the entrance porch was demolished. In 1966 the interior was modified according to the needs of the revised liturgy of the Second Vatican Council. The appearance of the church has not changed since then but it was renovated and modernized several times, specifically in 1981, 1989, 2002 and 2021.

In 1962-1964 new roads and a traffic interchange was built in connection with the construction of the new Elisabeth Bridge nearby which radically changed the urban surroundings again. Due to the disappearance of the Tabán district, the church became somewhat isolated, and the parish had a decreasing population in the last decades of the 20th century (numbering about 6000 people in 1982). There was a revival of parish life after the end of socialism in 1990.

== Architecture ==
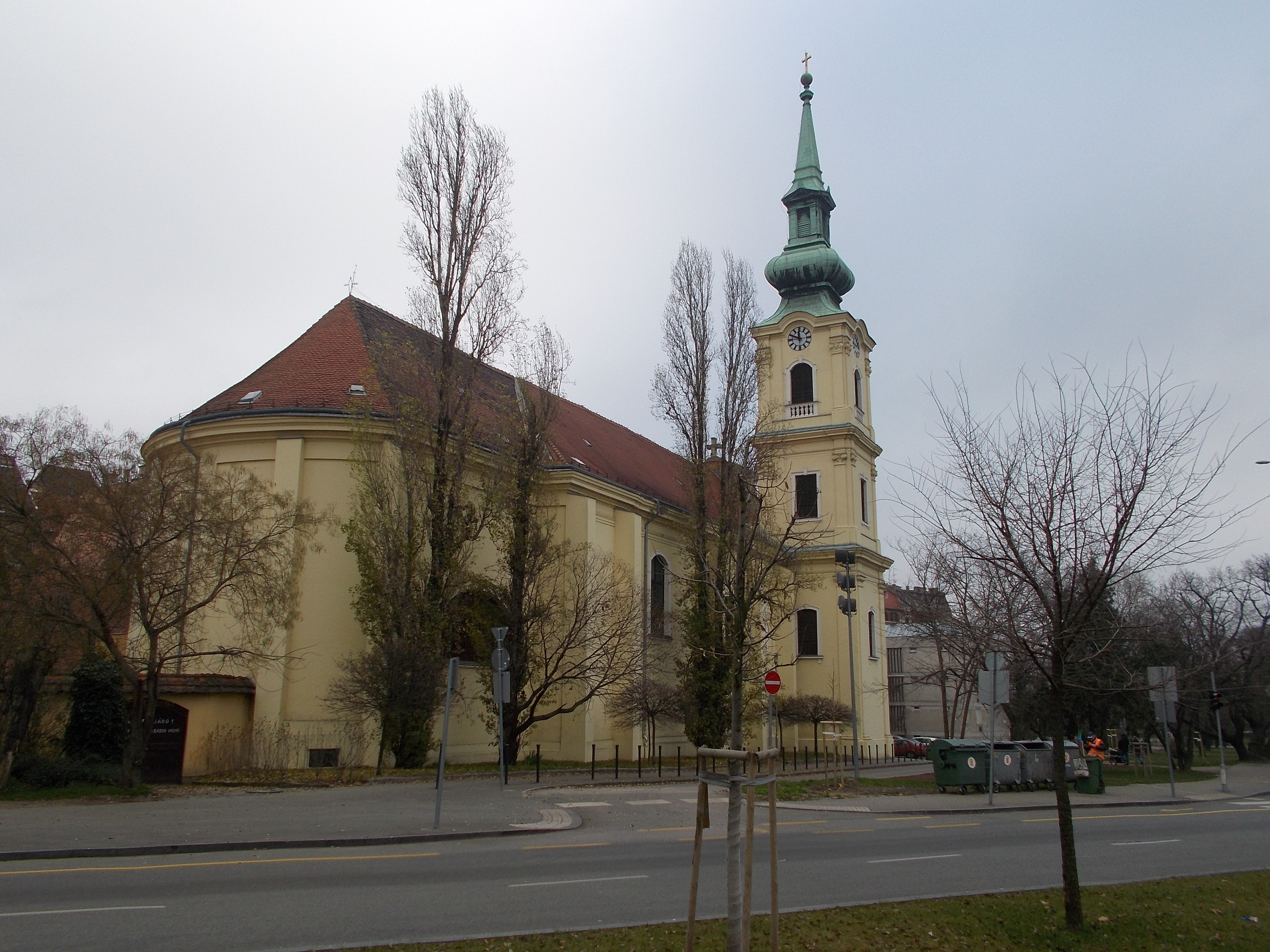
The church from northwest

The Church of Saint Catherine is a freestanding, single-nave Baroque church with a single tower on the southwest and an apse in the north. The main facade is divided into three vertical sections by simple Tuscan pilasters. The adjoining tower has similar pilasters at the corners on the ground floor. The articulated cornice runs around the whole building. The entrance was protected by a porch which was finally demolished in 1960. The central bay and the tower has simple segmental arched windows. The facade is crowned by a Baroque gable articulated by four smaller pilasters, flanked by volutes and surmounted by a curved pediment. The second storey of the tower has Ionic pilasters and rectangular windows, while the belfry (third storey) has Corinthian pilasters and arched windows with balconets. Four turret clocks are set into the arched cornice of the tower. The Neo-Baroque copper spire is composed of an onion dome, a lantern, triangular pediments and a steeple.

The main decorative elements of the facade are the niches which contain three statues by Gyula Szász from 1881. The sculptor was commissioned by the municipality on 16 October 1880 for a payment of 1200 forints, and the three figures were made of Sóskút sandstone. The figure of Saint Gerard Sagredo is a visual reference to the medieval origins of the parish, which was founded after Gerard's canonization in 1083 (the bishop was martyred nearby at the foot of Gellért Hill). Saint Charles Borromeo was a popular saint of the Catholic Counter-Reformation period, when the parish was re-established after a long hiatus, and the new church was dedicated to Saint Catherine.

The saints are portrayed with their attributes:

- Saint Catherine of Alexandria holding a ring and a book (with a broken wheel and a sword at her side) - pediment
- Saint Gerard Sagredo holding a cross - on the left
- Saint Charles Borromeo caring for the sick (with a rope in his neck) - on the right

The original Baroque facade was also decorated with statues of saints (namely Catherine, Andrew and Peter), stone vases, volutes and a cross. These were created by sculptor Anton Eberhardt and stone-cutter Johann Kugler in the 1750s.

A stone cross was erected in front of the church in 1806, which bears an inscription on the plinth: "Ao 1806". The present statue of the Virgin Mary by Károly Antal was added in 1975, replacing an older sculpture.

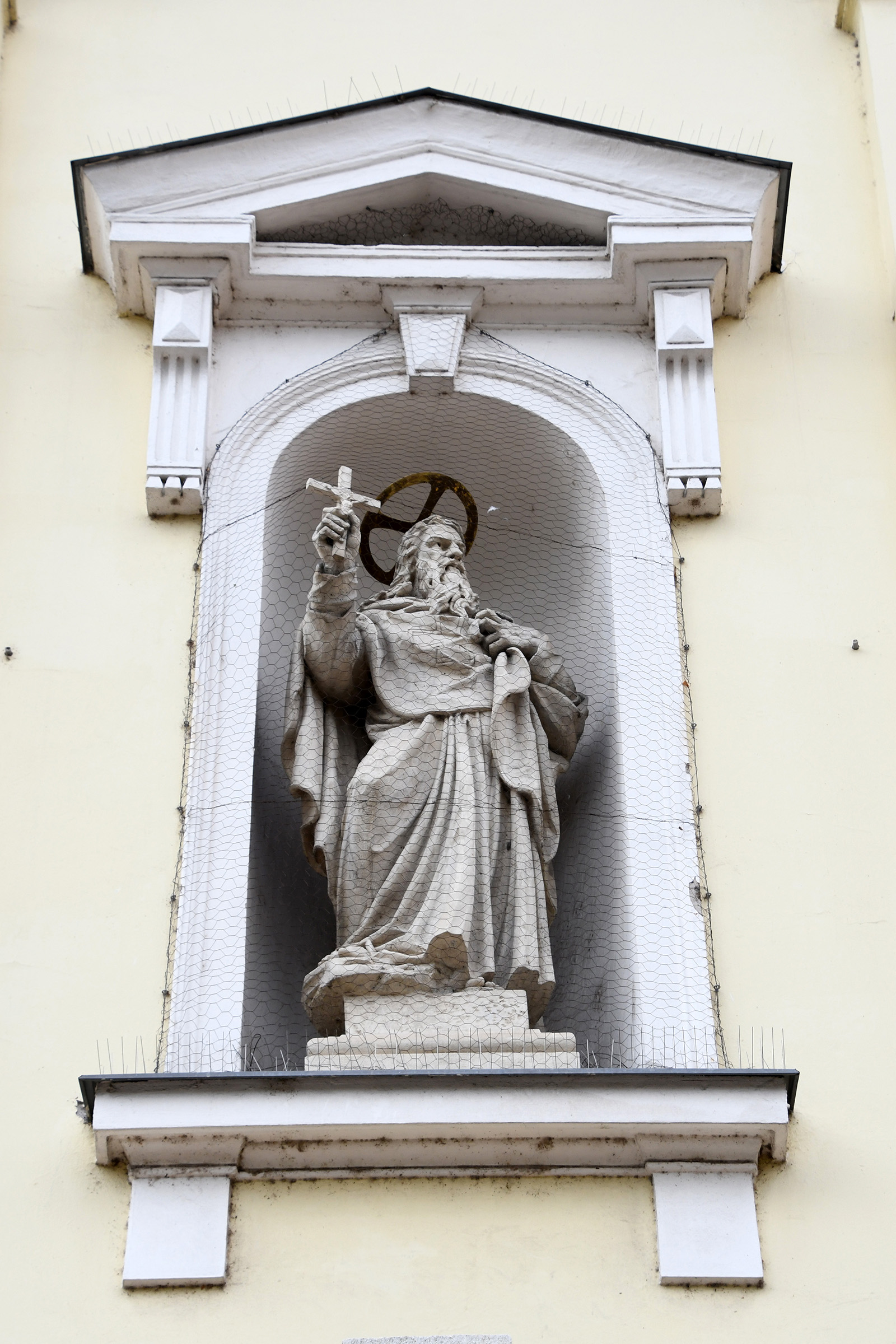
Saint Gerard Sagredo

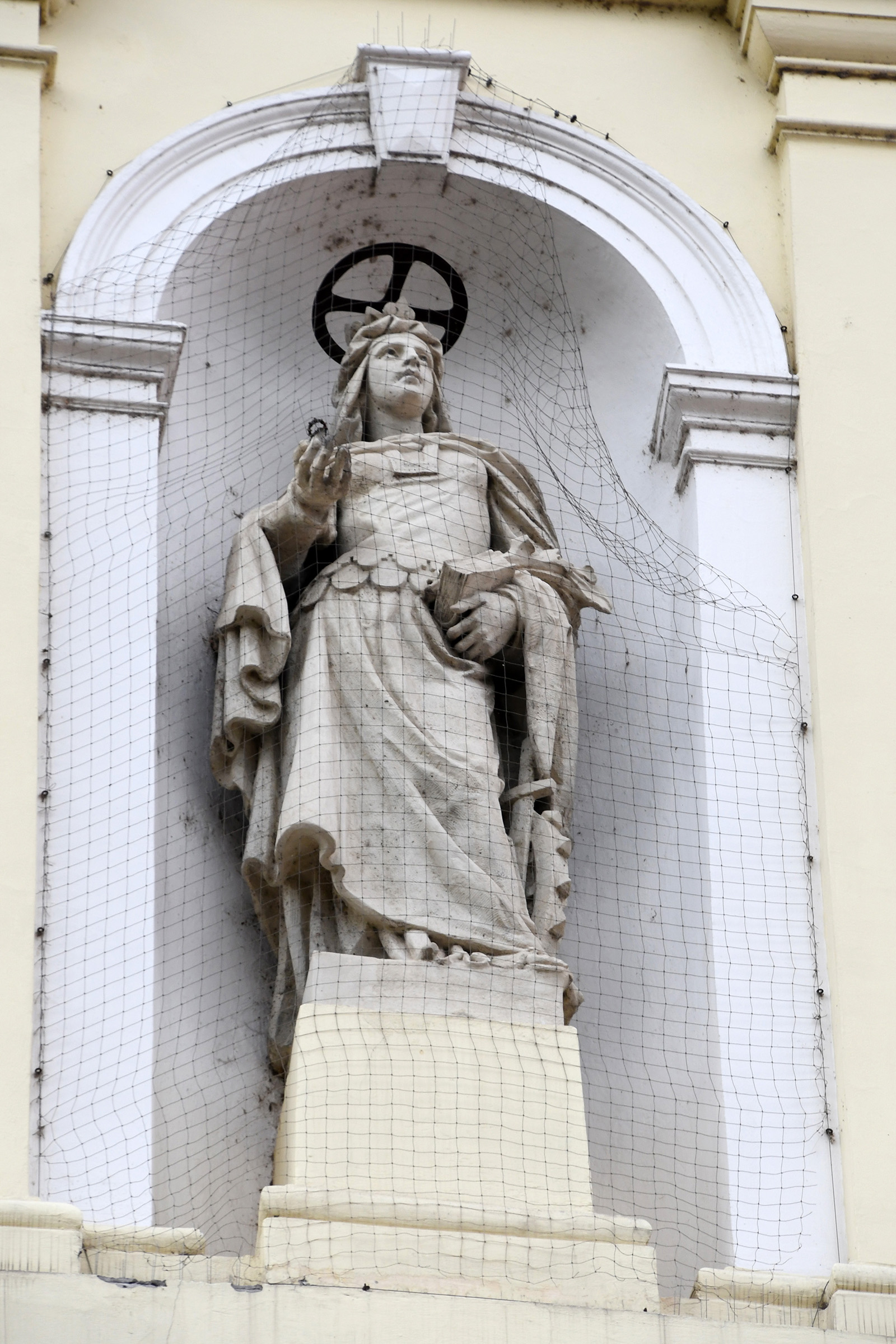
Saint Catherine

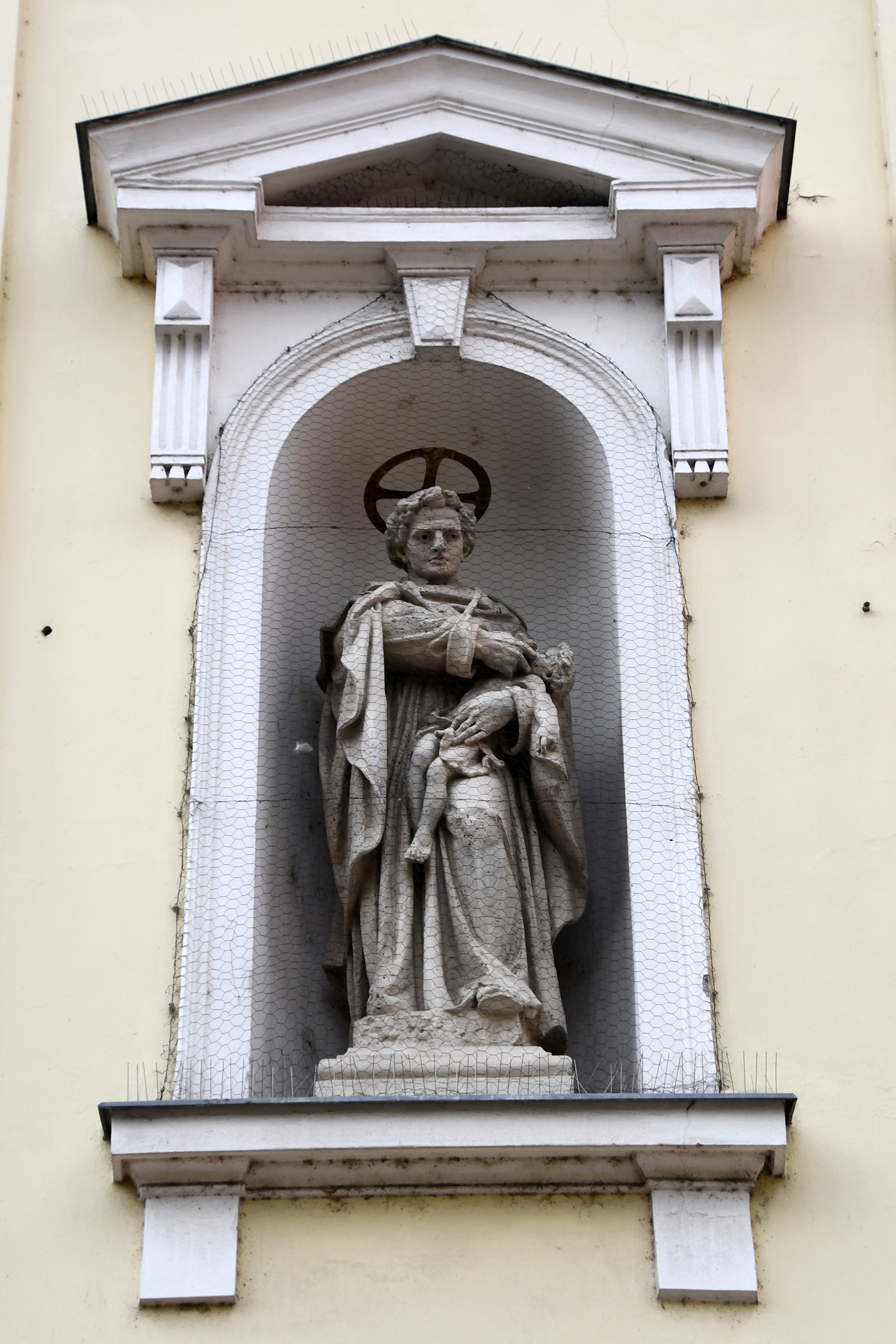
Saint Charles Borromeo

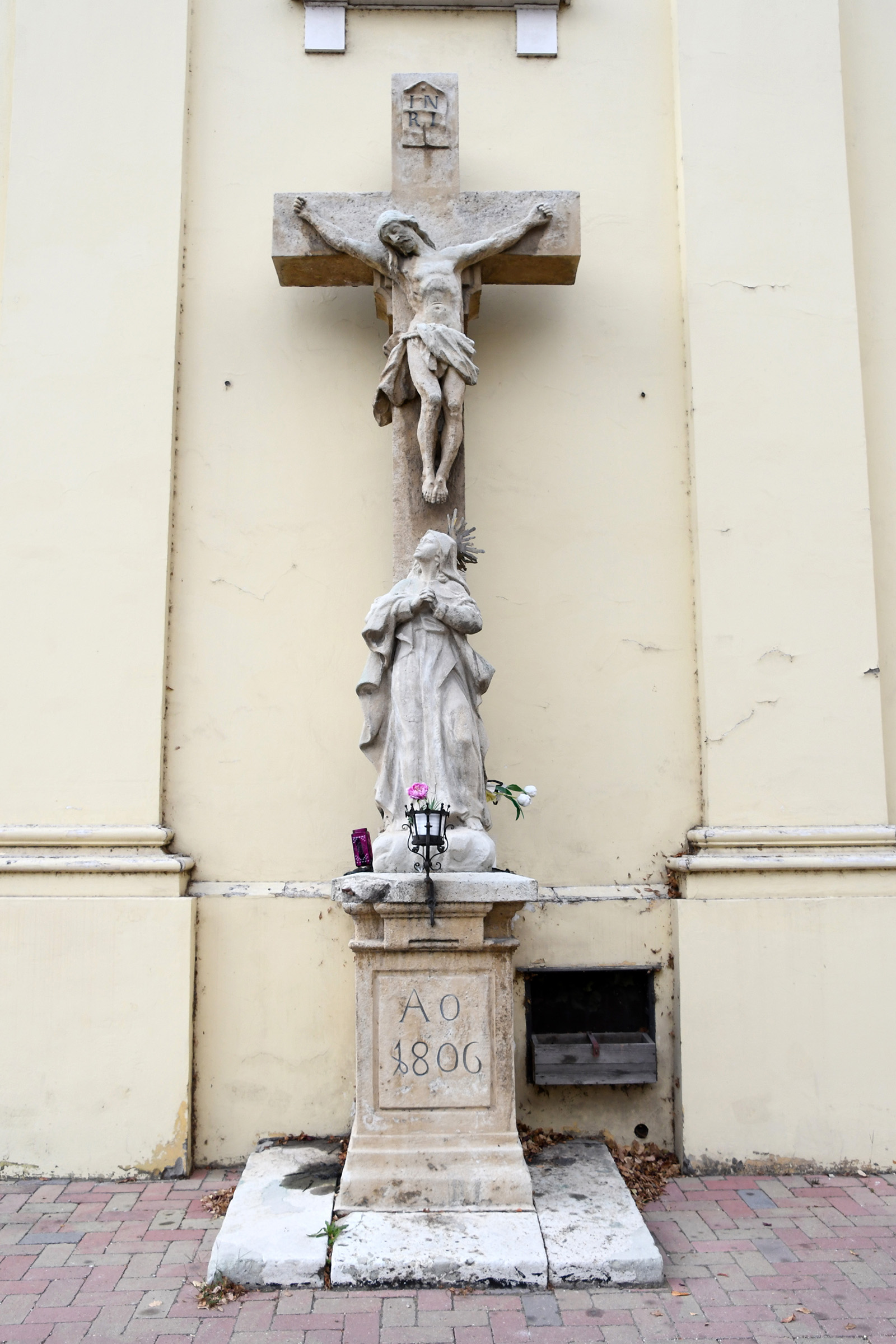
Stone cross from 1806

The side facades of the church are simple with large segmental arched windows. Originally the side walls and the apse were decorated with pilasters but in the end of the 1950s the building was strengthened with reinforced concrete buttresses on the outside. The sacristy to the left of the chancel was demolished in the end of the 19th century.

The urban context of the church has been changed fundamentally in the 19th-20th century with the widening of Attila út and several phases of large-scale demolitions. An outbuilding for the parish office occupies the central part of the original narrow churchyard on the north and the west which is not open to the public.

== Interior ==
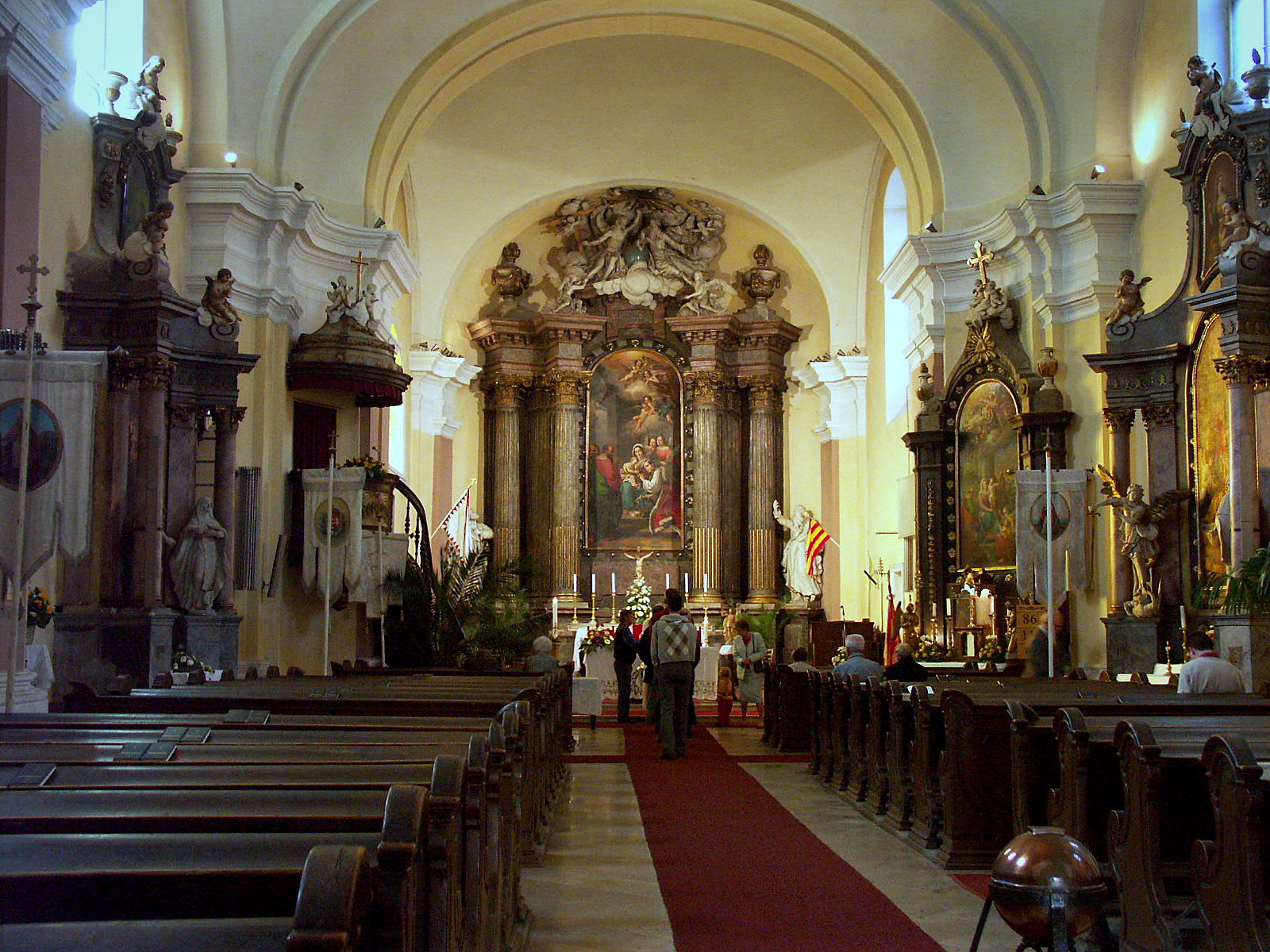
The interior of the church

The nave of the church is four bays long. The first three bays are covered with barrel vaults, while the wider fourth bay is covered with a Bohemian vault. The apse is surmounted by a pendentive dome, and a concave triumphal arch joins it to the nave. The double transverse arches sprung from pairs of simple Tuscan pilasters. The projecting cornice is strongly articulated. The first bay contains the western narthex, which is covered with three cross vaults, and opens toward the nave with a central elliptical arch and two semi-circular arches. The organ loft above the narthex has a solid convex parapet. There is a small chapel on the ground floor of the tower which is connected to the narthex. Every bay has segmental arched windows on both sides while the chancel is lit by a similar window on the right and the large, arched opening of the former oratory which was part of the demolished sacristy.

Main altar

The main altar of the church was built after the Great Tabán Fire of 1810 which had destroyed the previous structure. According to a description from 1756, the church had a richly decorated main altar with several statues and an oil painting of Saint Catherine of Alexandria. This was replaced by the second Baroque altar between 1803 and 1806. The present main altar was designed by József Dankó in a classicizing Late Baroque (Zopf) style in 1810-1812. The sculptural elements were made by stonemason Peter Bauer while the plaster statues were created by Johann Kurtzweil.

The monumental retable has four colossal, partly gilded Corinthian columns and an elaborate entablature. It is crowned by a large sculptural group representing the Holy Trinity with the mappa mundi orb. The figures of the Father and the Son are surrounded by angels and clouds, and there is an ascending cross on the left. This group is flanked by two flaming vases. The large plaster statues on the sides of the altar depict the Apostles Peter and Paul. In 1910 a Neo-Baroque predella with two adoring angels was added to the altar which obstructed the lower part of the altarpiece; this was removed during the reconstruction in the 1950s. Two 18th-century angel statuettes, a statue of Our Lady of Sorrows, a crucifix and six candlesticks are sometimes displayed on the ledge of the altar.

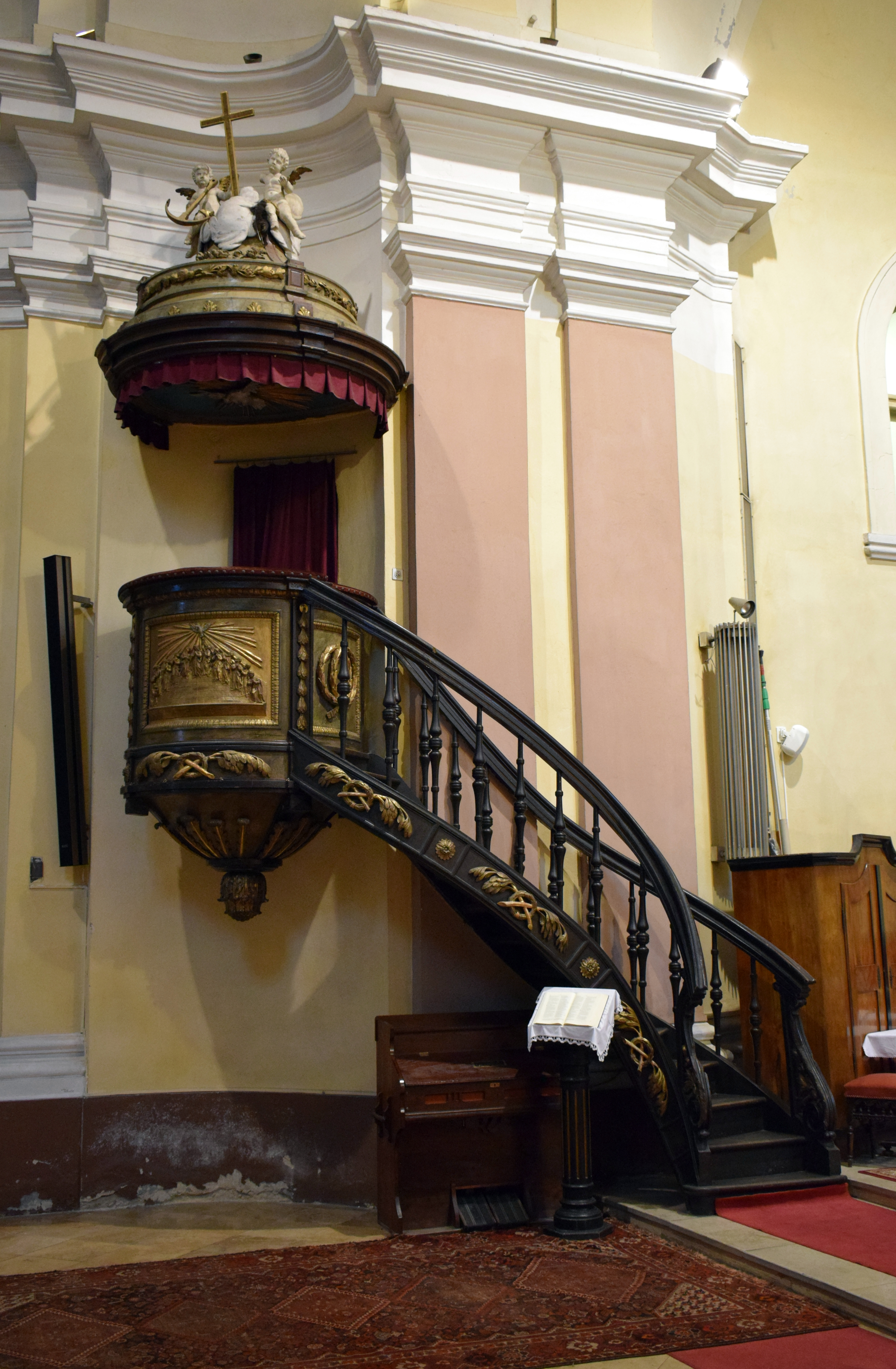
The Empire style pulpit

The altarpiece is set in a concave frame decorated with gilded rosettes. The original painting by Joseph Karl Schöfft was destroyed in the bombardment of 1849. The present altarpiece was painted by Jakab Marastoni in 1850. The Venetian painter, who lived in Pest-Buda, received a commission from the parish to paint two large oil paintings for the church replacing those that were damaged in the revolutionary war. The 900 forints fee was only paid out in 1852 after some controversy. The Betrothal of Saint Catherine is a large oil painting in Italian style with appealingly warm colours, painted with smooth academicism and clearly composed figures. It follows the traditional iconography of the mystical marriage of the saint: Saint Catherine receives a ring from the infant Christ held by his mother. The scene is watched by the Apostles Peter and Paul, two angels and a group of putti in the sky. The saint is depicted in royal robes with a crown and a broken wheel, her usual attributes at her feet, and one of the angels is holding the palm of martyrdom.

Pulpit

The previous Baroque pulpit was destroyed by the Great Tabán Fire of 1810; it was a richly decorated structure from the 1740s with several statues. The present Empire style pulpit was created in 1822 by János Dolánszky, the sculptural elements were made by Frigyes Held. After the demolition of the Baroque sacristy in 1896, the original approach was lost, stairs were added, and one of the parapet panels was converted to a door. The surface is painted light green imitating marble with gilt ornaments. Iconography: the Pentecost (central relief), laurel wreathes (parapet panels), wreathes and palm branches. The sculptural group on the top of the abat-voix is composed of putti among clouds holding a cross and an anchor.

Side altars

The first side altar is the Altar of the Holy Family on the epistle side of the chancel, opposite the pulpit. It was built after the Great Tabán Fire around 1815 in a similar Late Baroque style to the main altar and all the other important items of church furniture. The pediment is decorated with two flaming vases, the Eye of Providence and two putti holding a cross. This is the altar where the eucharist has been kept in a Neo-rococo tabernacle since the predella of the main altar was removed. Four candlesticks and two statues of angels in adoration are displayed on the ledge. The altarpiece is set in a concave frame decorated with gilded rosettes. The original painting was destroyed in the bombardment of 1849. The present altarpiece was painted by Jakab Marastoni in 1850 in a similar Italianate style as the painting on the main altar. It depicts a sacra conversazione between the Holy Family and John the Baptist, Elizabeth and Zechariah with angels and putti in the sky.

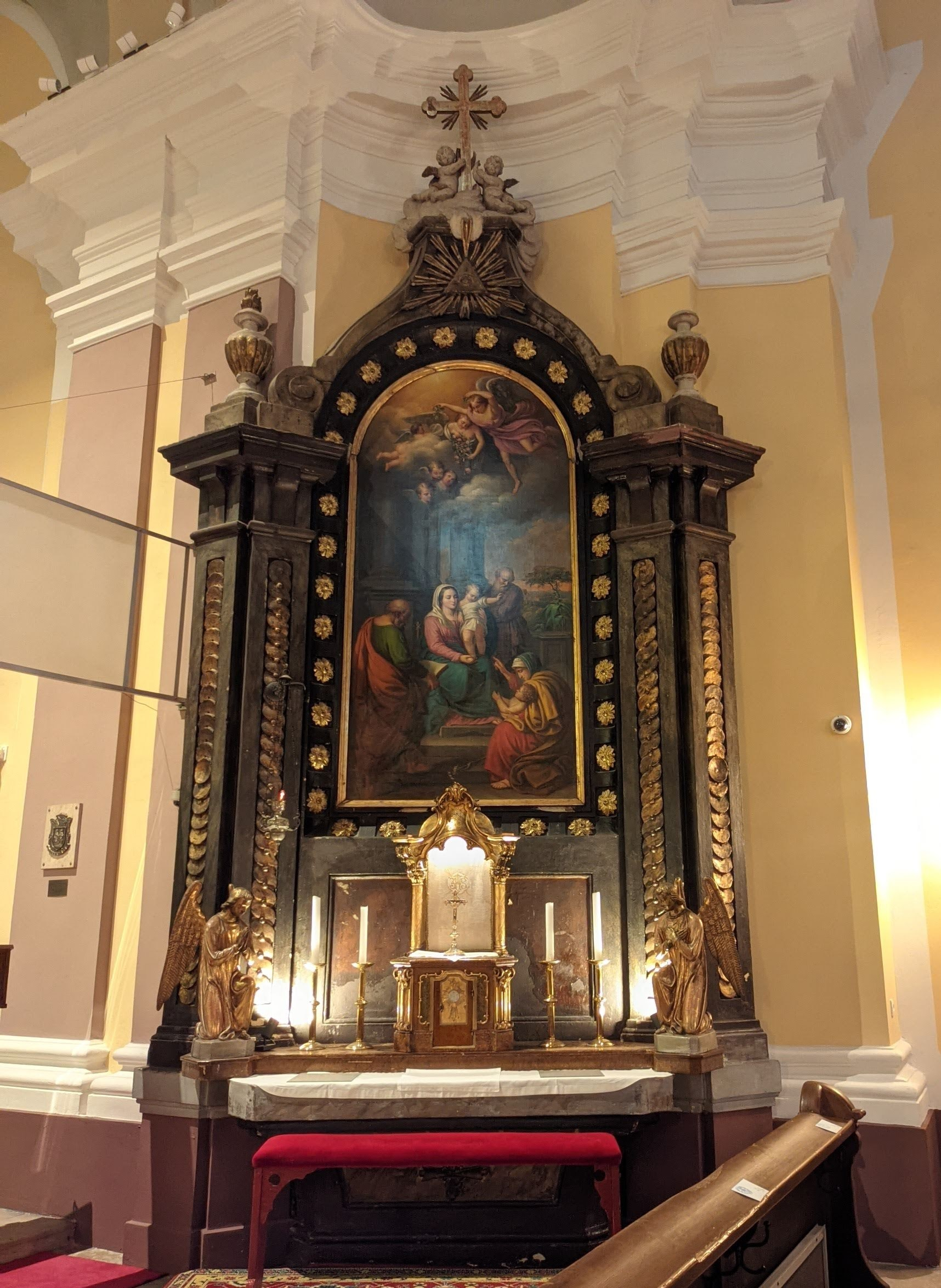
The Altar of the Holy Family with the Holy Family with John the Baptist by Jakab Marastoni (1850)

The Altar of Saint Joseph is the second side altar on the right; it belongs to the most ornate type of Late Baroque side altars in the church. The pediment is decorated with volutes, three putti and flaming vases. The altarpiece is flanked by a pair of decorative Corinthian columns and two statues, Archangel Michael slaying a serpent and Saint Emeric of Hungary. The Death of Saint Joseph on the altar was painted by Joseph Karl Schöfft, it depicts Saint Joseph lying on a bed with Jesus, Virgin Mary and an angel at his side, with a pail of tools in the foreground. A painting of Saint Thecla is set in the pediment; it shows the saint with a lioness at her feet.

The Altar of Saint Anthony of Padua on the opposite side of the nave has the same ornate design. Both were donated by Wenzel Schützenberger and his wife in 1816, and still have their original donation plaques. The statues show Saint Barbara (carrying a chalice) and Saint Catherine of Siena (as a nun in Dominican habit). The painting on the altar by Joseph Karl Schöfft depicts the Franciscan saint holding the Infant Jesus with a pair of children at his feet, holding an open book and a white lily stalk; two angels in the sky are carrying a wreath. A modern painting of Saint Francis was set in the pediment in the 1980s replacing the original image of the Virgin Mary.

The remaining three altars have a simpler Late Baroque design with gilded decoration on the top (small flaming vases, name plates and crosses) and slim side columns or pilasters; they have no altar tables. The original fourth altar of this type was dedicated to Saint Teresa but it was destroyed in 1945. The Altar of Saint Anne was donated by Anton Hierwarter, and the naive altarpiece was painted in 1872 by C. Sauer. The altarpiece of the Altar of Saint Lawrence was created in the first half of the 19th century by an unknown artist, it depicts the saint wearing a dalmatic in the company of two angels, kneeling on a cloud with a gridiron beneath his feet. The Altar of Saint Florian, the first side altar on the right, is one of the most important works of art in the church. The altarpiece was created by Joseph Karl Schöfft in 1811. The painting is a contemporary depiction of the Great Tabán Fire which destroyed the whole area in the previous year. Schöfft lived in the city of Pest, and was probably an eyewitness of the catastrophe. The saint is depicted as a Roman officer kneeling on a cloud above the burning town. A putto is pouring water on the flames while an angel is holding a veil with the inscription: "Allmächtigster Gott mit Vunder schützest du uns änzelne Hauser erschone O Gnädigster in Zukunft auch unsere mit Bruder In Cen DIVMIn ras CIanICa Die 5 Sept", a prayer to God to protect the houses and the people of the town in the future. The Latin part of the inscription is a chronogram which gives the date of the fire: 5 September 1810. Schöfft painted the burning city as seen from Pest with its two churches and the row well-built houses on the Danube bank. There are two burning ships on the river, heavily loaded with goods, which is another historically accurate element.

Organ

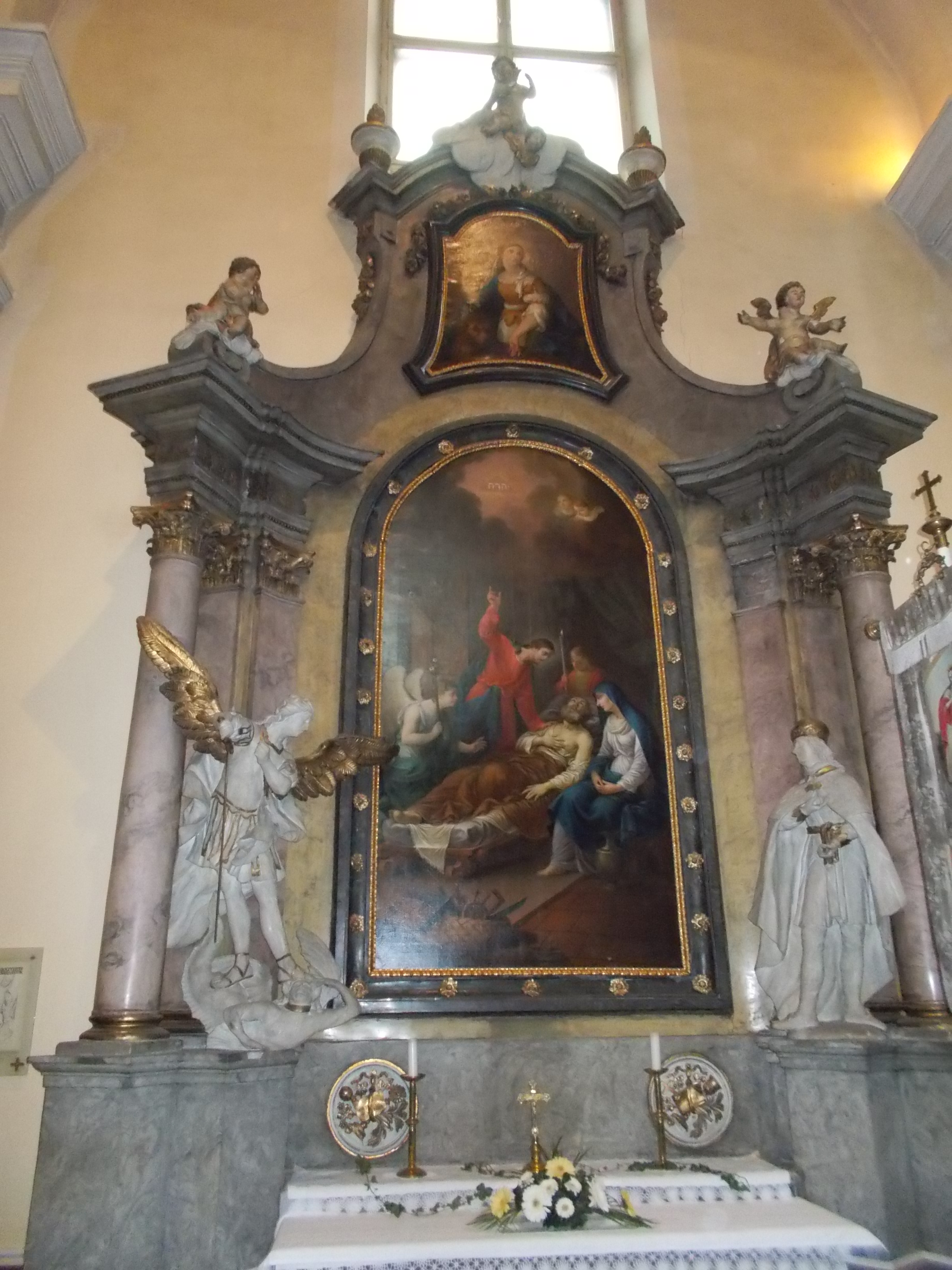
The Altar of Saint Joseph with the Death of Saint Joseph by Joseph Karl Schöfft (1816)

The first organ of the church was built by Johann Staudinger in 1725; this was modified in 1738. In 1751 a new organ was ordered from Johann Vierengel, which was completed in 1755, year before builders death. The organ had to undergo frequent repairs until it was replaced by a new organ in 1797, built by Wilhelm Hartmann, which was lost in the Great Tabán Fire of 1810. A new organ was created in 1834-35 by Károly Focht, a 23-year-old young organ builder from Pest, as his masterpiece. When it was inaugurated, this was the most beautiful and best sounding church organ in Pest and Buda, and it had several technological innovations. A concert was held on 29 October 1835 in the church by Johann Nepomuk Batka performing Bach's organ works and his own compositions which was enjoyed by a large audience. The ornate Empire style cases, painted bluish green with a faux marble effect, are decorated with Ionic columns, half-pillars, urns and gilded ornaments; the Eye of Providence is set in the pediment of the central aedicule. The large organ case was designed in a way that it does not block the light from the central window. A new pipe organ mechanism was constructed by Ottó Rieger in 1905.

Furniture

The Baroque pews were made after those which survived the 1810 fire; the originals were the works of Johann Ender, the same woodworker who created the lost Baroque main altar of the church in 1743-44. Other valuable items are the Empire confessional (after 1810) and a Neo-Baroque patron's pew in the chancel with the coats-of-arms of Budapest (1927). The stone baptismal font is one of the few artefacts that survived the Great Fire, it was made by Johann Kugler in 1749; the wooden cover is decorated with a sculpture of Jesus baptized by John.

Chapel of Mary

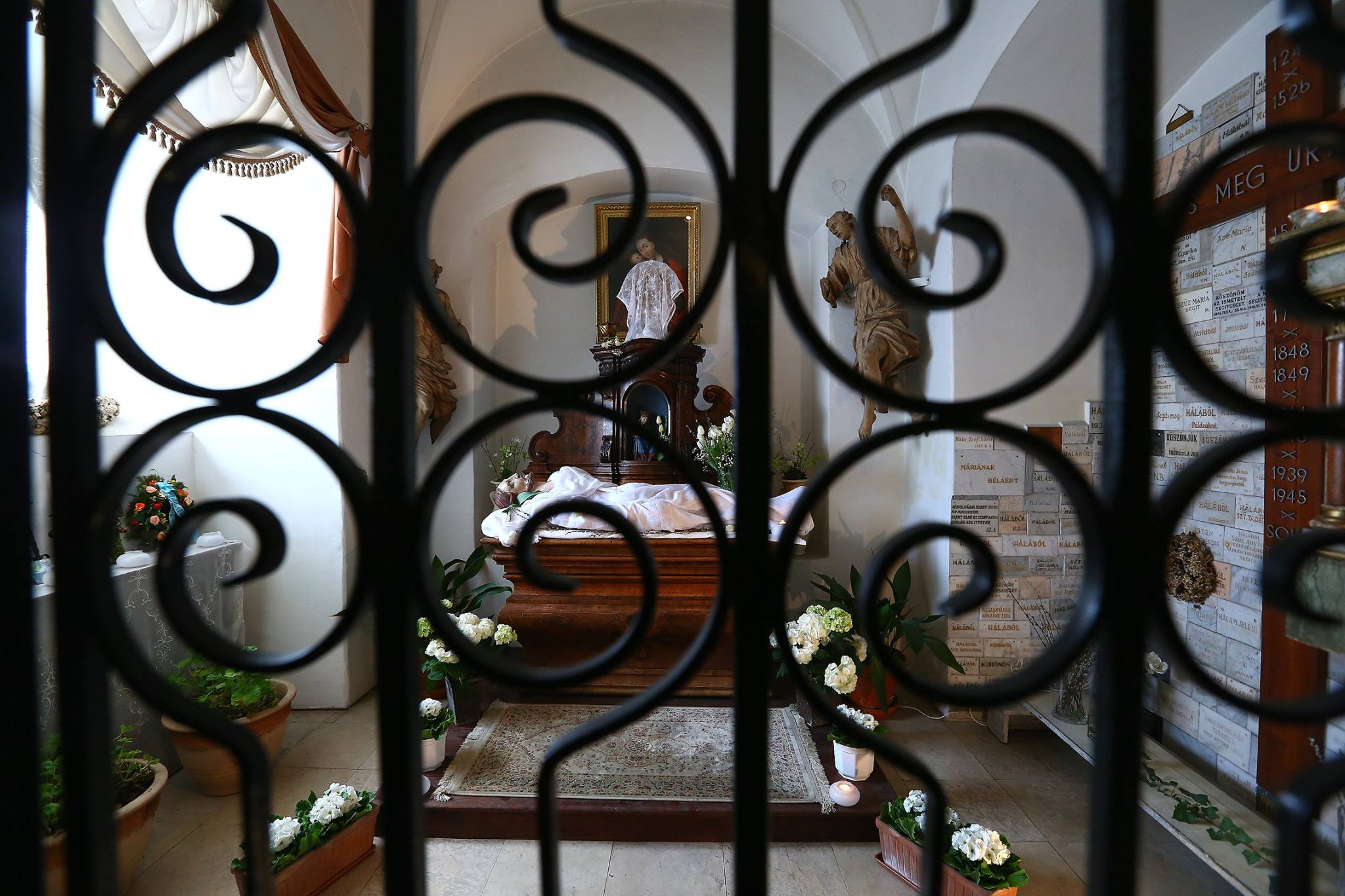
The Chapel of Mary on the ground floor of the tower

The vaulted chapel on the ground floor of the tower opens to the narthex, its entrance is protected by an iron grille. In the 18th century it was dedicated to the Holy Cross but also served as the Holy Sepulchre during Easter. Now the chapel is furnished with an early 18th-century Baroque altar which is made of polished wood with marquetry inlay. A small statue of Saint Elizabeth of Hungary is placed in the tabernacle niche. The altar was not part of the original furniture of the church, and stood in front of the Altar of Saint Anne in the 1950s. There is an 18th-century painting of the Madonna and Child above the altar. Two wooden statues of angels, which survived the Great Tabán Fire of 1810, are also preserved in this chapel. The chrism is kept in a built-in cabinet near the entrance, and the northern wall is covered with votive tablets.

Narthex

A painted and carved wood Ecce Homo statue is placed in a niche behind a grille on the right wall of the narthex; it was created between 1740 and 1760, and survived the Great Tabán Fire of 1810. A pair of shell-shaped, red limestone holy water stoups by Carlo Adami (1778) also belong to the period before the fire. There are three oil paintings in the narthex, Jude the Apostle and Saint Peter by J. Rauch (1844) and a modern painting of Saint Rita by Masa Feszty (1970). A copy of the famous Romanesque Tabán Christ relief is placed on the wall where the original sculpture was located until the Second World War (the sculpture itself is preserved in the Budapest History Museum). The origin of the 12th-century Maiestas Domini relief is uncertain but it was preserved by the Baroque builders of the church as a historic relic.

Lost artworks

The interior of the church had several phases of fresco decorations, but none of them have survived. The frescoing of the chancel dome was first mentioned in 1822, and most probably it was created after the Great Tabán Fire of 1810. The fresco depicted Saint Catherine and the four Evangelists. A new fresco was painted around 1850 by József Wágner but this was in turn replaced in 1890 by a fresco of László Kimnach, commissioned by the Municipality of Budapest. In 1913 the parish priest, János Leimeter had it covered with whitewash, and commissioned a scene-painter to create new decorations, which caused an uproar. The Kimnach fresco was rediscovered and restored in 1928 by instruction of the municipal heritage commission. At the same time the side walls and the vaults of the church were embellished with ornamental Neo-Baroque painted decorations by Béla Sándor. Although the interior has suffered some war damage, the ceiling frescoes were only removed during the modernist reconstruction of the church in 1957-58. The Lamentation of Christ, an 1890 fresco by Lázár Nagy on the western wall of the apse, was destroyed at the same time when the semicircular window of the former oratory was reopened.

The Apotheosis of Saint Catherine by László Kimnach was an animated Neo-Baroque composition. The painting illusionistically opened up the vault of the chancel toward the sky showing the ascent of the saint to Heaven. It was framed by trompe l'oeil architecture in the form of a round cornice. Saint Catherine was surrounded by angels and putti among clouds, holding a large cross and a chalice in her hands. The four Evangelists with their symbols were depicted on the spandrels of the dome.

The stained glass windows of the church were also removed in the end of the 1950s. They were created by József Palka in 1910-11, and financed by different donors. The seven windows of the nave and the chancel depicted various religious scenes: Mary appearing in the grotto of Lourdes; the Holy Family; Saint Anne teaching the Virgin to read; the Annunciation; Anthony of Padua with the Infant Jesus; Christ and John on the Last Supper and the Baptism of Jesus. The stained glass window of the organ loft was commissioned by the parish priest, János Leimeter in 1911 for the memory of his mother who died that year; it depicted a coat-of-arms with a black flag and a dedicatory inscription.

The chancel was modernized in 1965-66 according to the requirements of the reformed Catholic liturgy after the Second Vatican Council. The wrought-iron communion rail, which was decorated with heads of putti and vegetal scrolls, was removed. The ornate Neo-Baroque wood panels added by János Leimeter in the early 1910s were also eliminated, and a new table altar and lectern was installed.

== Gallery ==
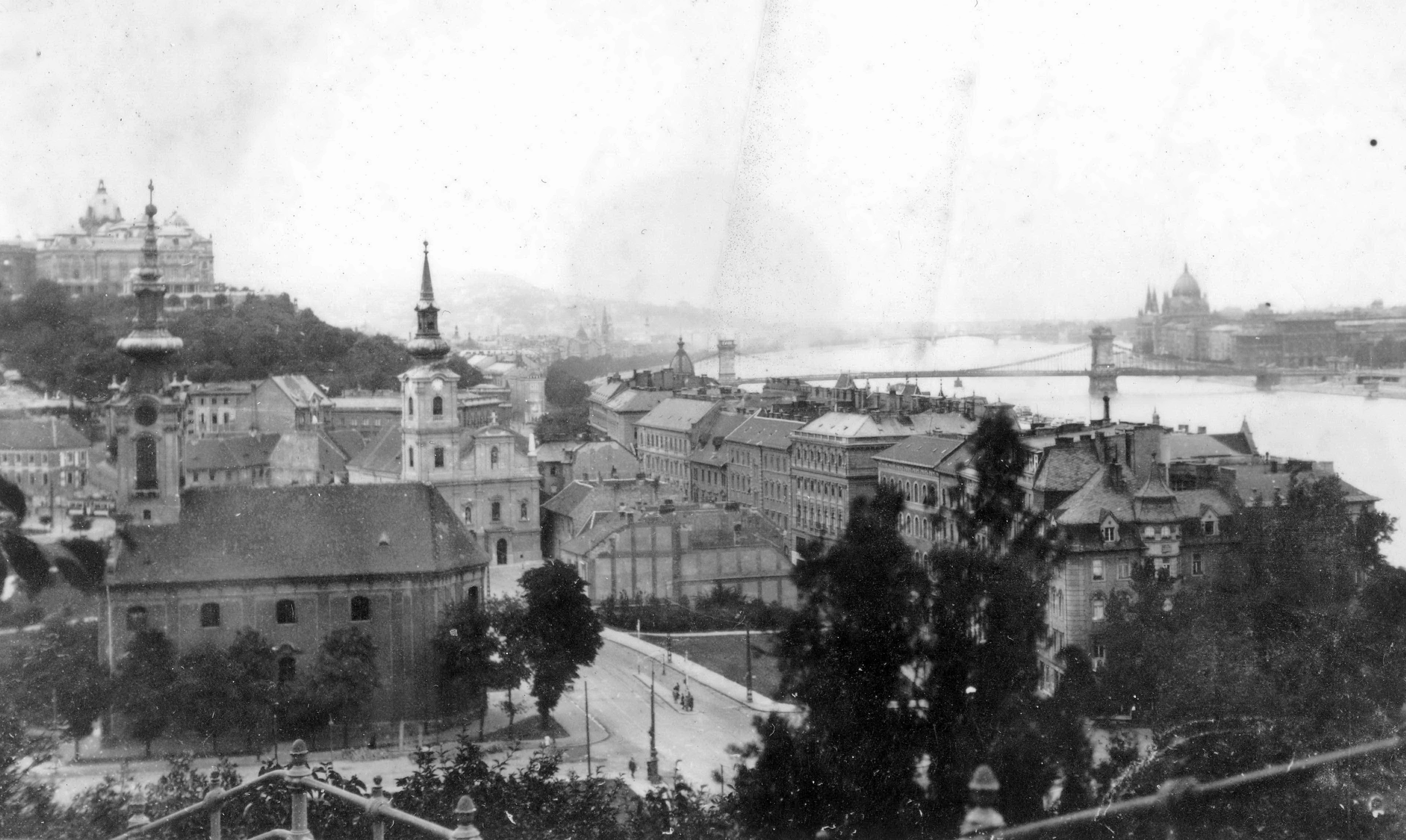
Tabán in 1942 with the two churches

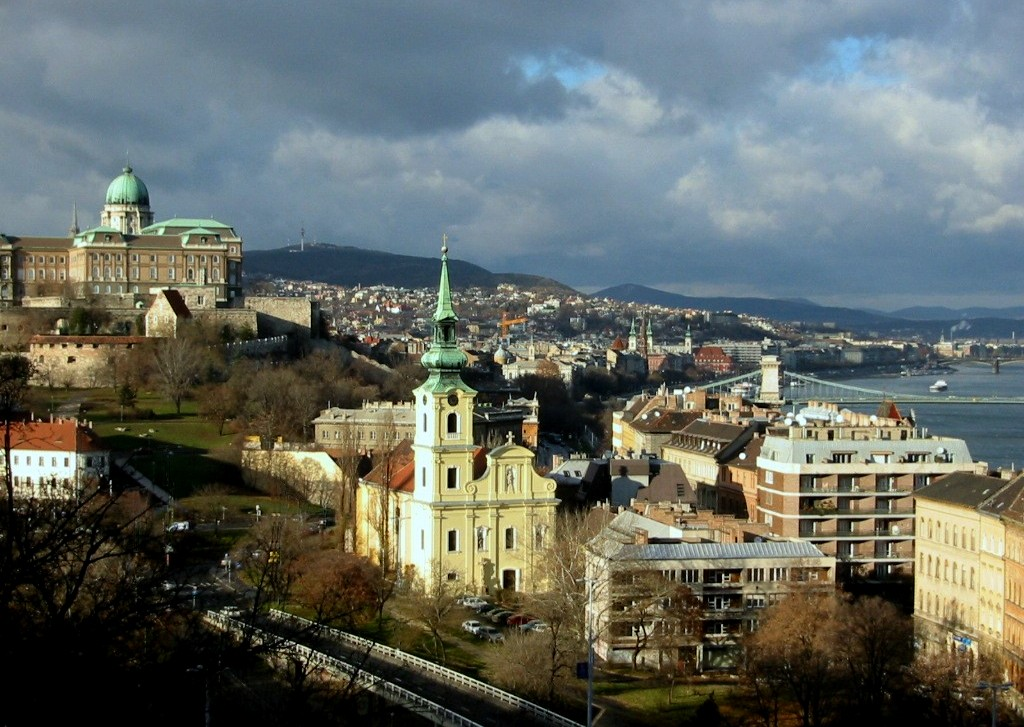
View of the church from the Gellért Hill

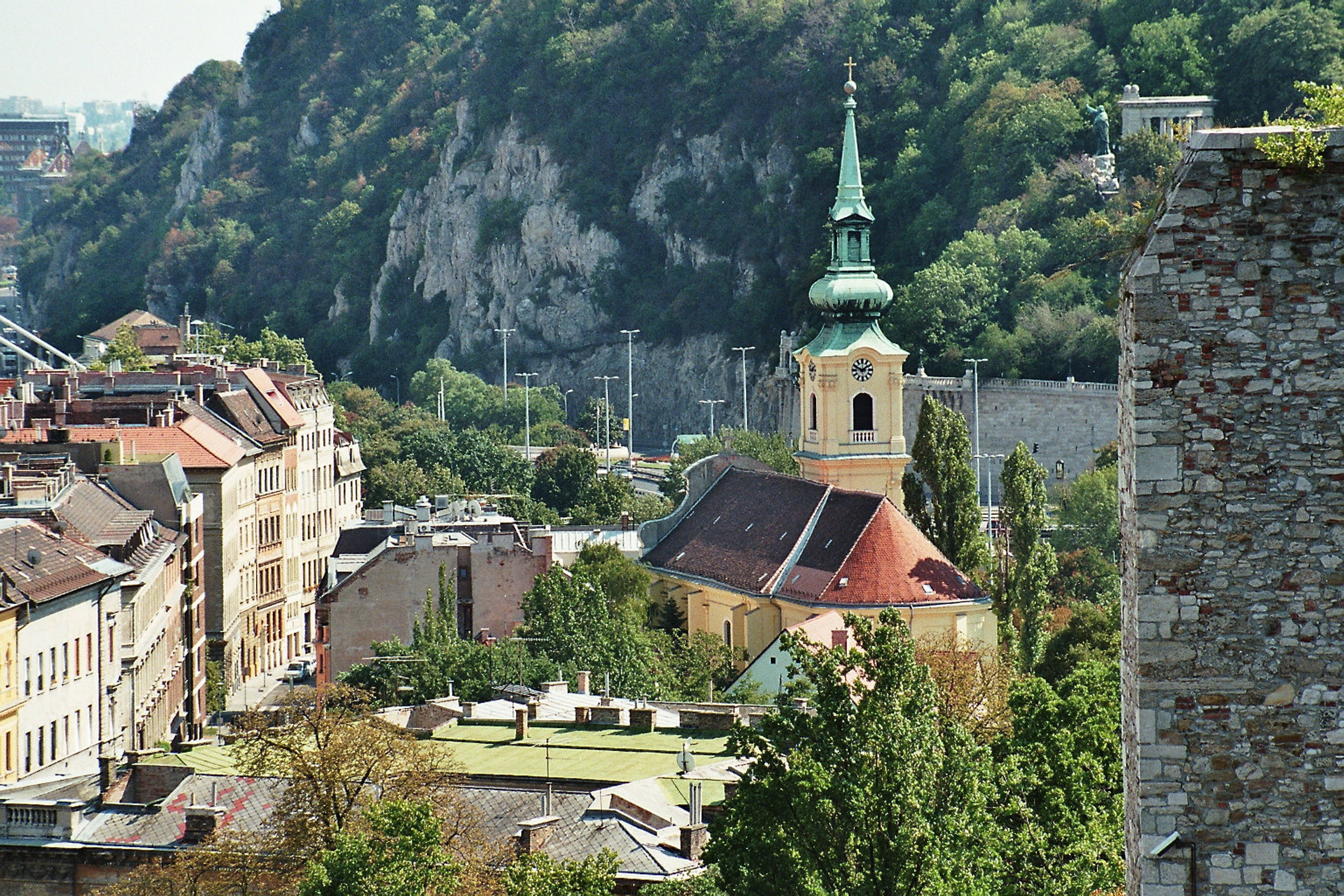
The church from Buda Castle with Gellért Hill in the background

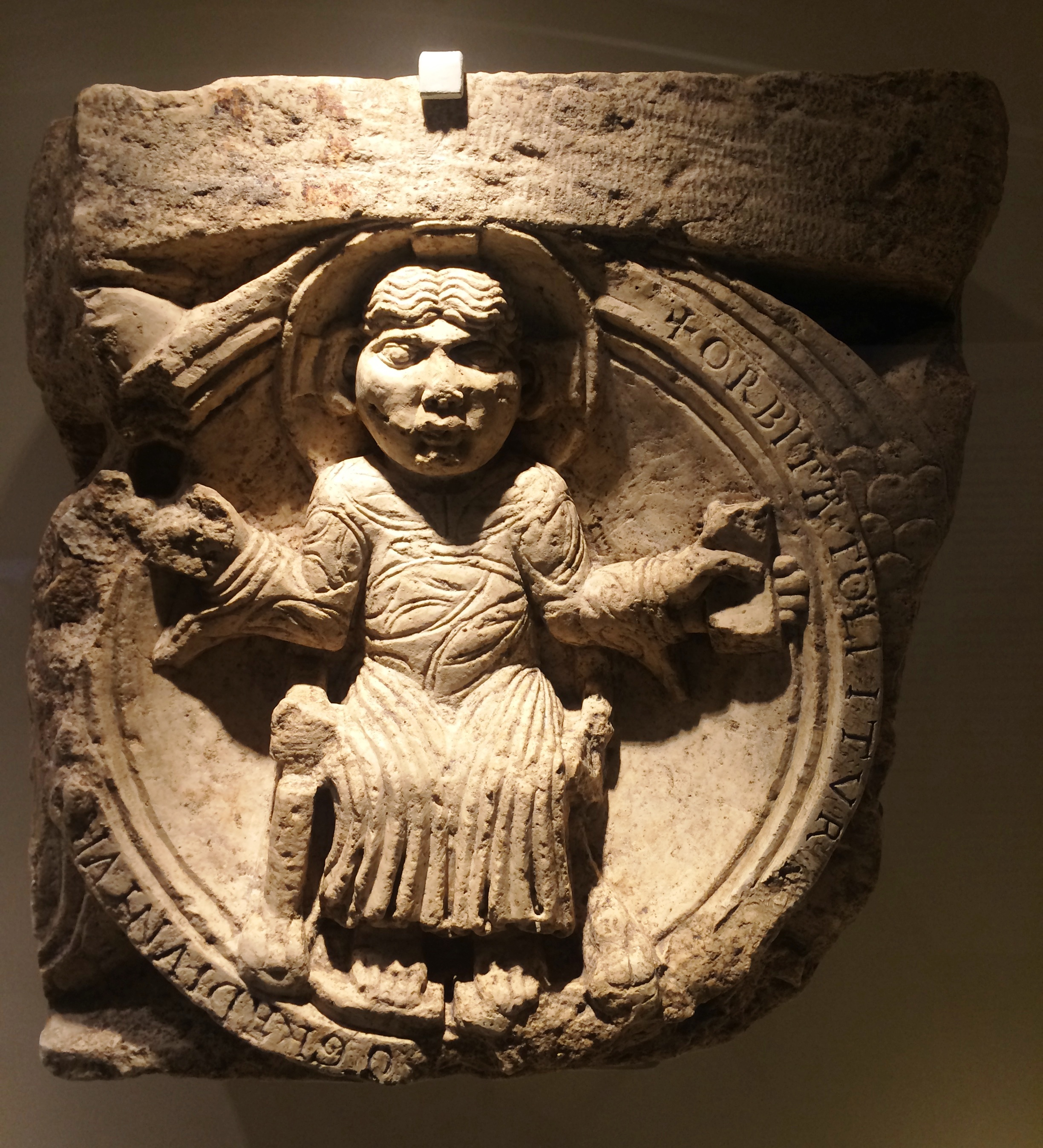
The 12th-century relief of the Tabán Christ

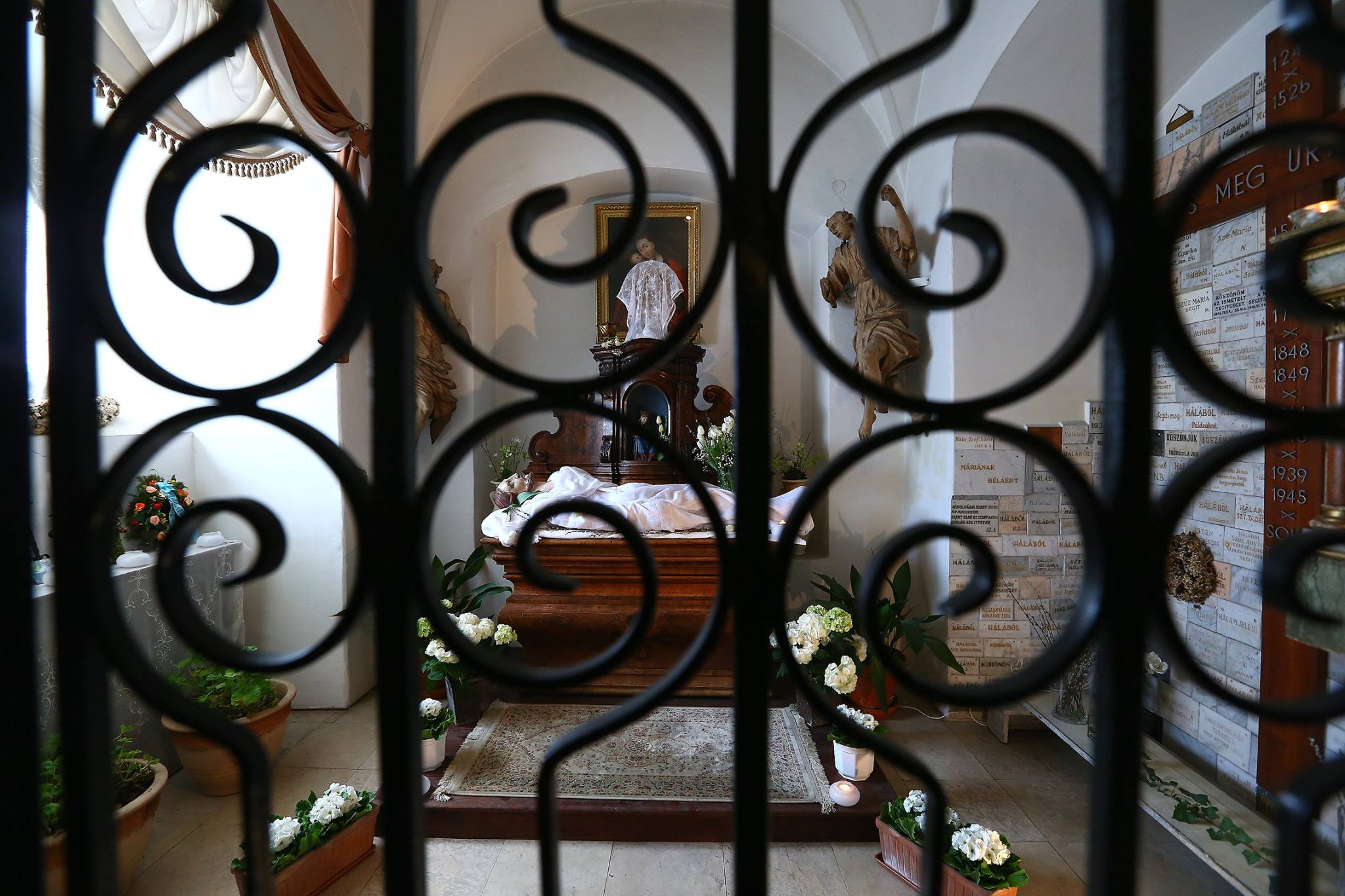
Holy Sepulcher

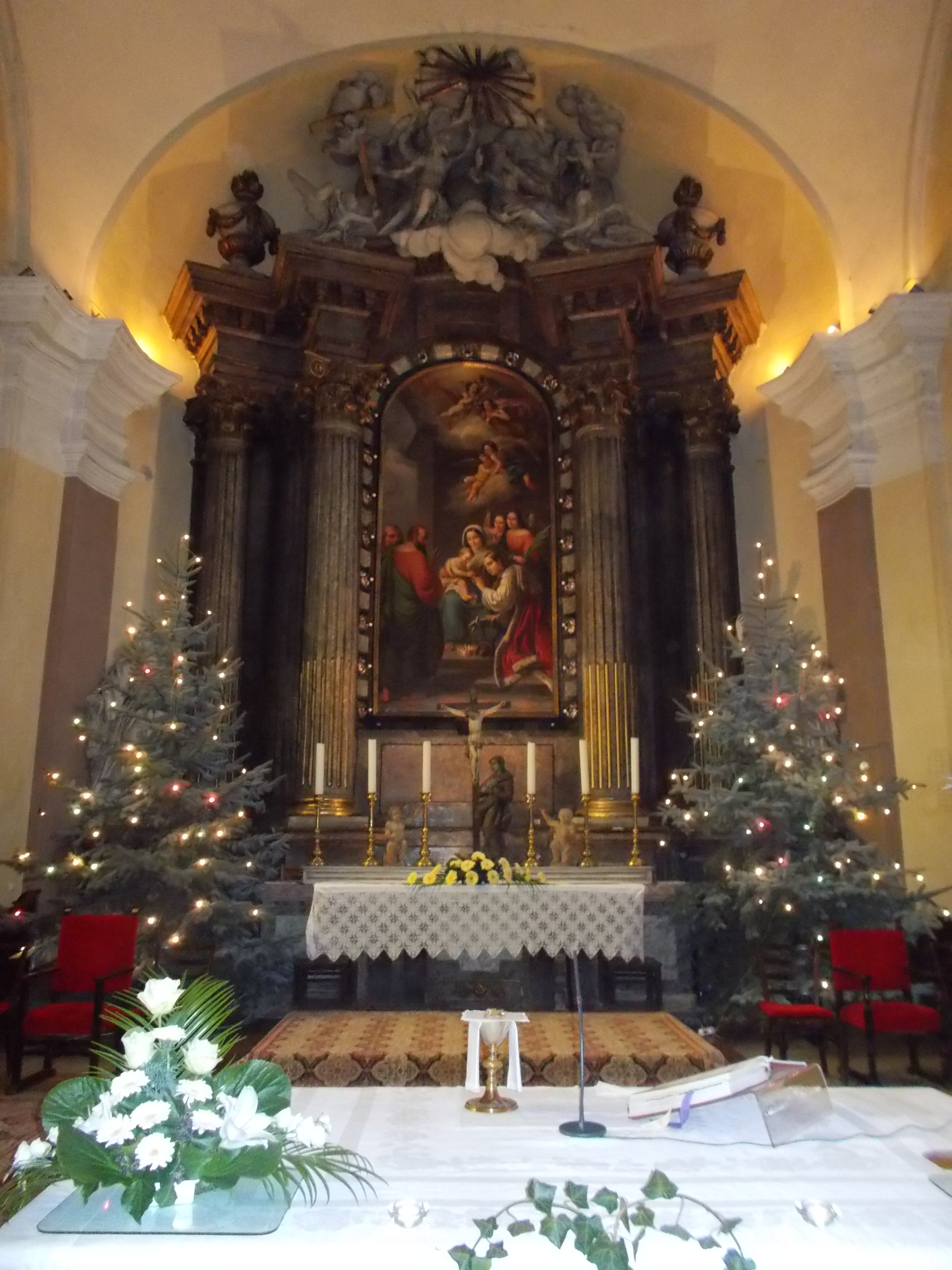
Main altar

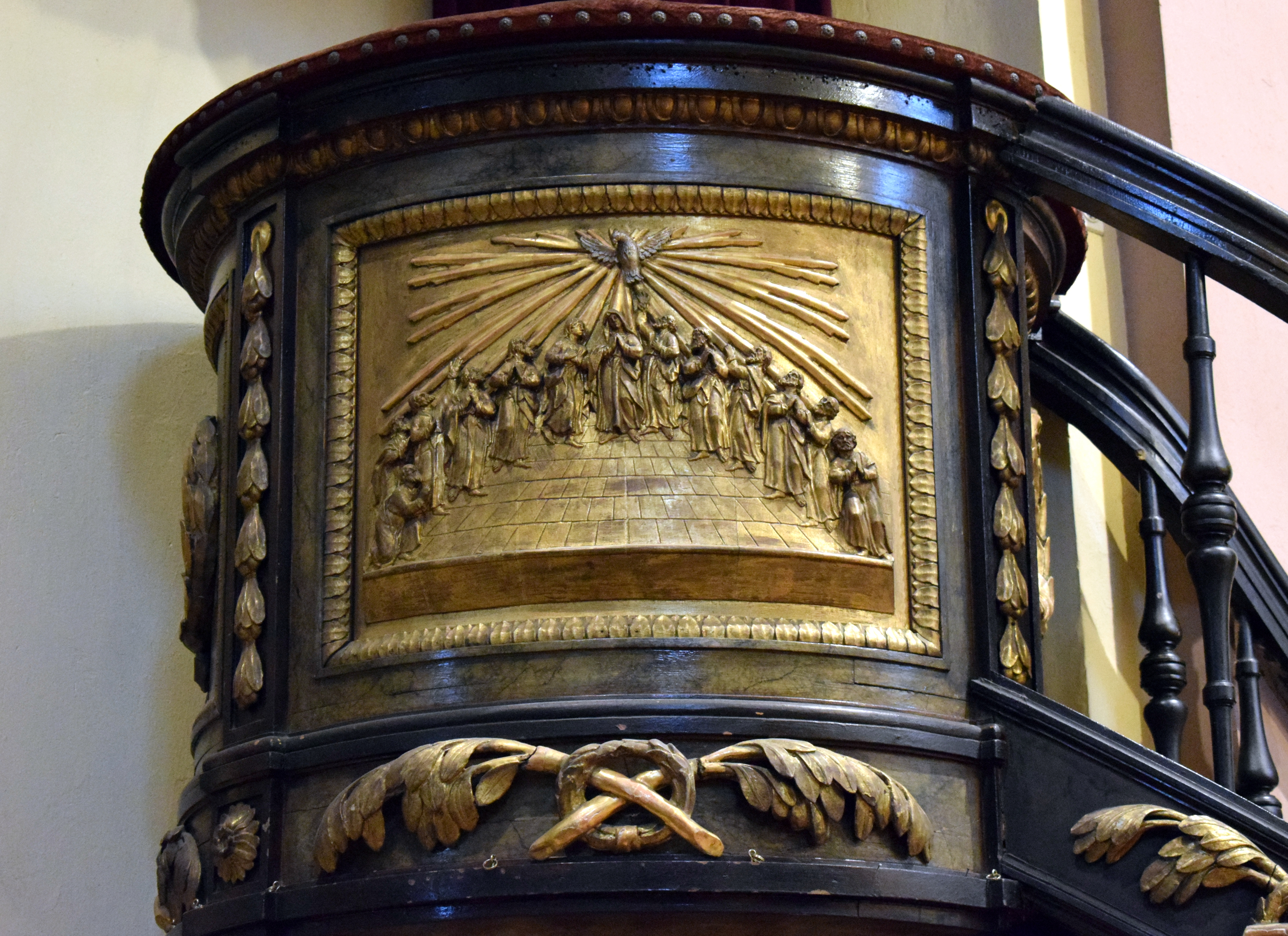
The Pentecost, relief on the pulpit

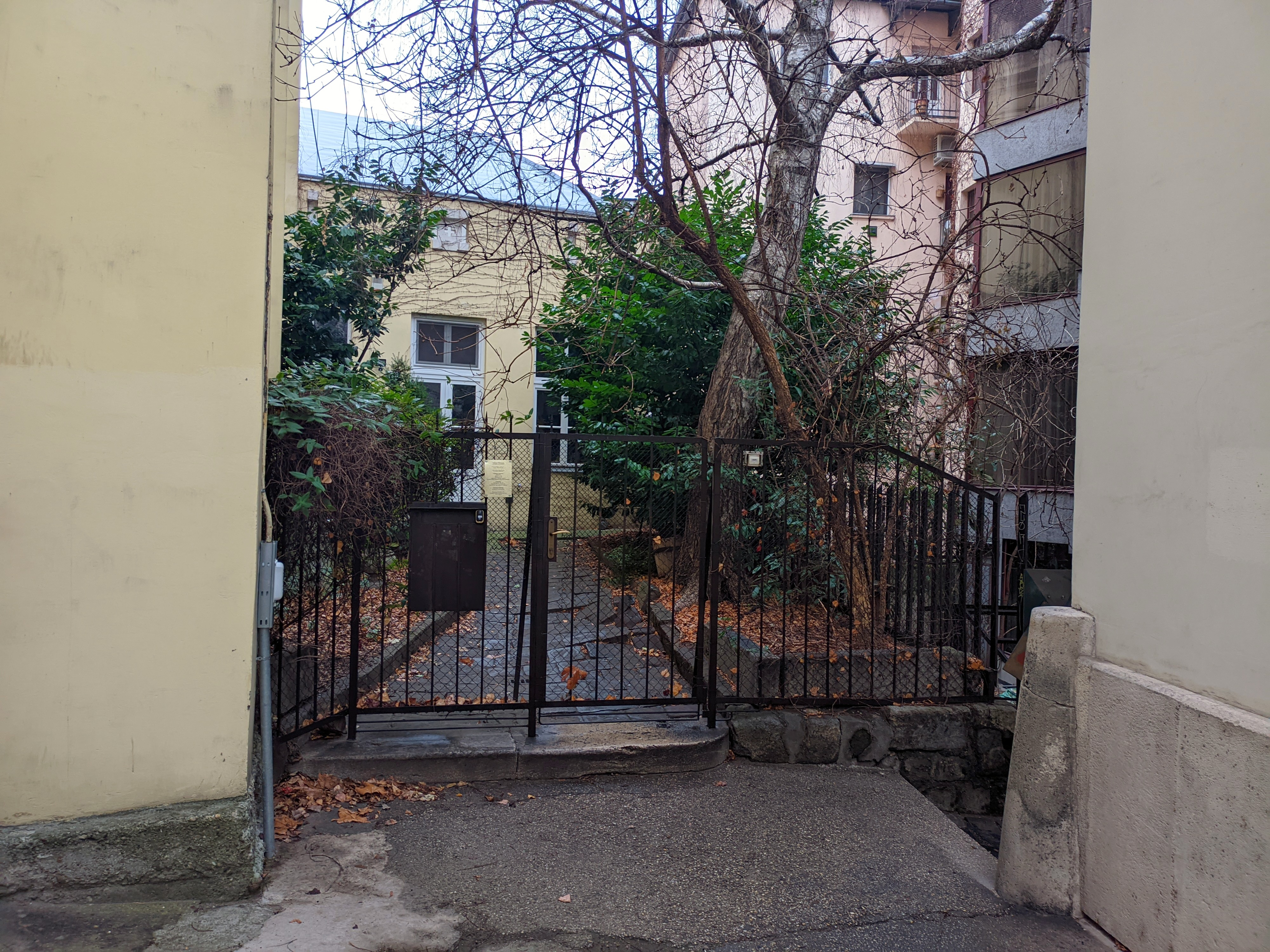
Churchyard with the parish office

== See also ==
- Church of Saint Demetrius, Budapest
- Tabán Christ
