= Tabán Christ =

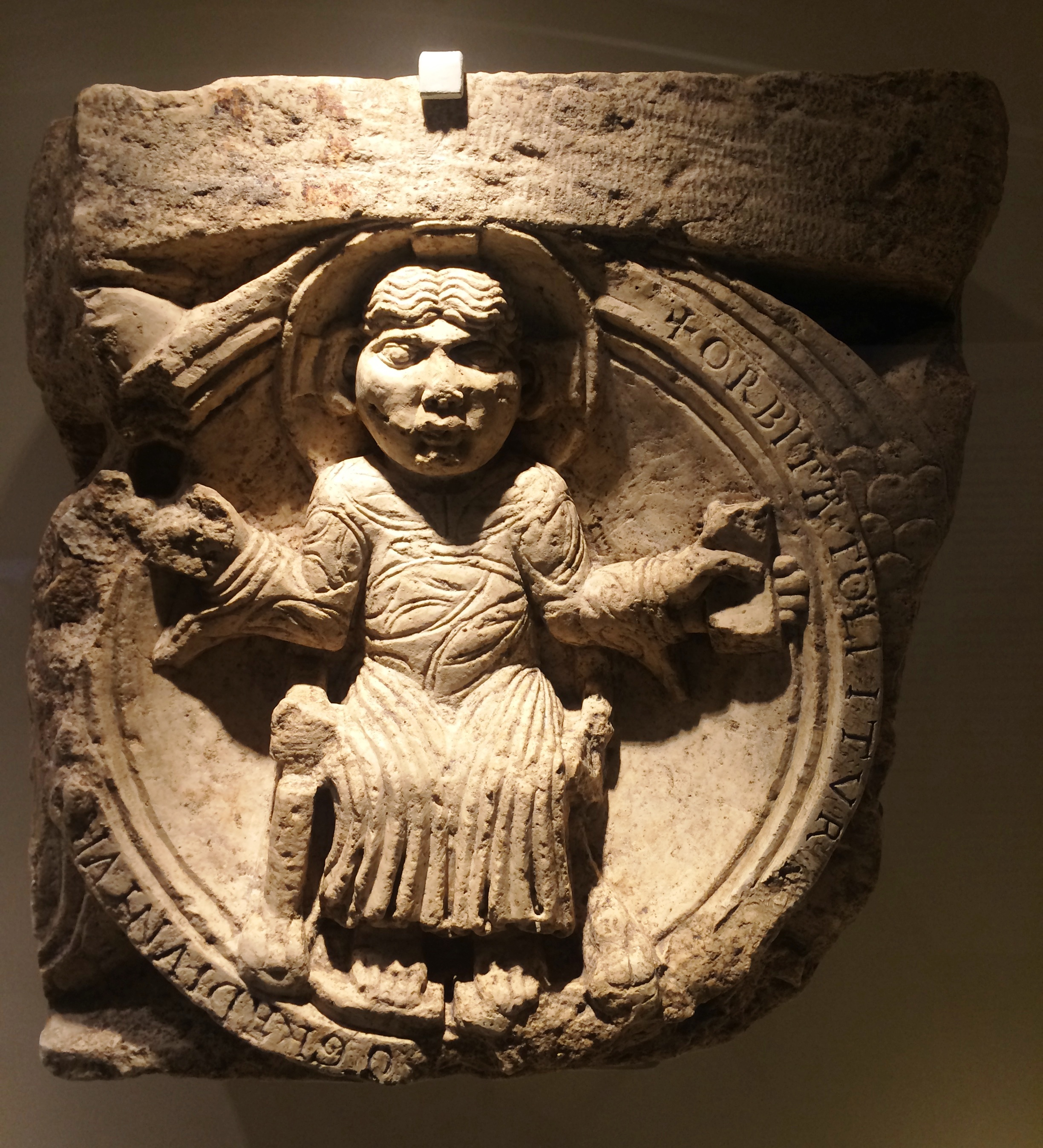
- Artist: Anonymous
- Year: 12th century
- Type: Stone relief (fragment)
- Medium: limestone
- Dimensions: 38 cm × 37 cm (15 in × 15 in)
- Location: Budapest History Museum; Budapest

The Tabán Christ (Hungarian: Tabáni Krisztus) is a 12th-century Maiestas Domini relief from Budapest. Originally part of a larger composition, the fragment is an important work of Romanesque sculpture from the territory of the medieval Kingdom of Hungary. The relief was discovered in a secondary position in the Church of Saint Catherine, the Baroque parish church of the Tabán neighbourhood in Buda. It has been located in the Budapest History Museum since 1952.

== Description ==
The youthful, beardless Christ is depicted seated on a throne, wearing a tunic, with a cruciform halo around his head. In his left he holds a small object which has been interpreted as a scroll, the object in his right hand is unrecognizable. The figure is set in a round medallion that bears an inscription on its rim. Only smaller fragments survived from the other elements of the composition: the upper part of a circular frame, which was significantly larger than the central medallion, and heavily damaged traces of decorative carvings around the medallion. A feathered wing is discernible with long quills and coverts on the upper right corner.

The fragmentary Latin inscription with Roman square capitals on the rim of the central medallion reads:

ORBITA TOLLITVR .... O GRADIVNTVR

The relief is interpreted as Christ in Majesty (Maiestas Domini), and it was supposedly part of the tympanum carving of a Romanesque church portal. The feathered wing may have belonged to an angel, the symbol of Matthew the Apostle, in that case the symbol of John the Evangelist was carved on the other side according to the traditional iconography.

== History ==
The relief was first described by art historian Kornél Divald in 1901. At the time it was set in the wall under the organ loft in the Church of Saint Catherine in an obviously secondary position because the church was only built in the 18th century. In a passing reference Divald presumed the fragment came from the early medieval predecessor of the church which was dedicated to Saint Gerard of Csanád and established after 1083. The exact location of this church, which served the town of Kispest, a medieval settlement in the Tabán area, remains unknown.

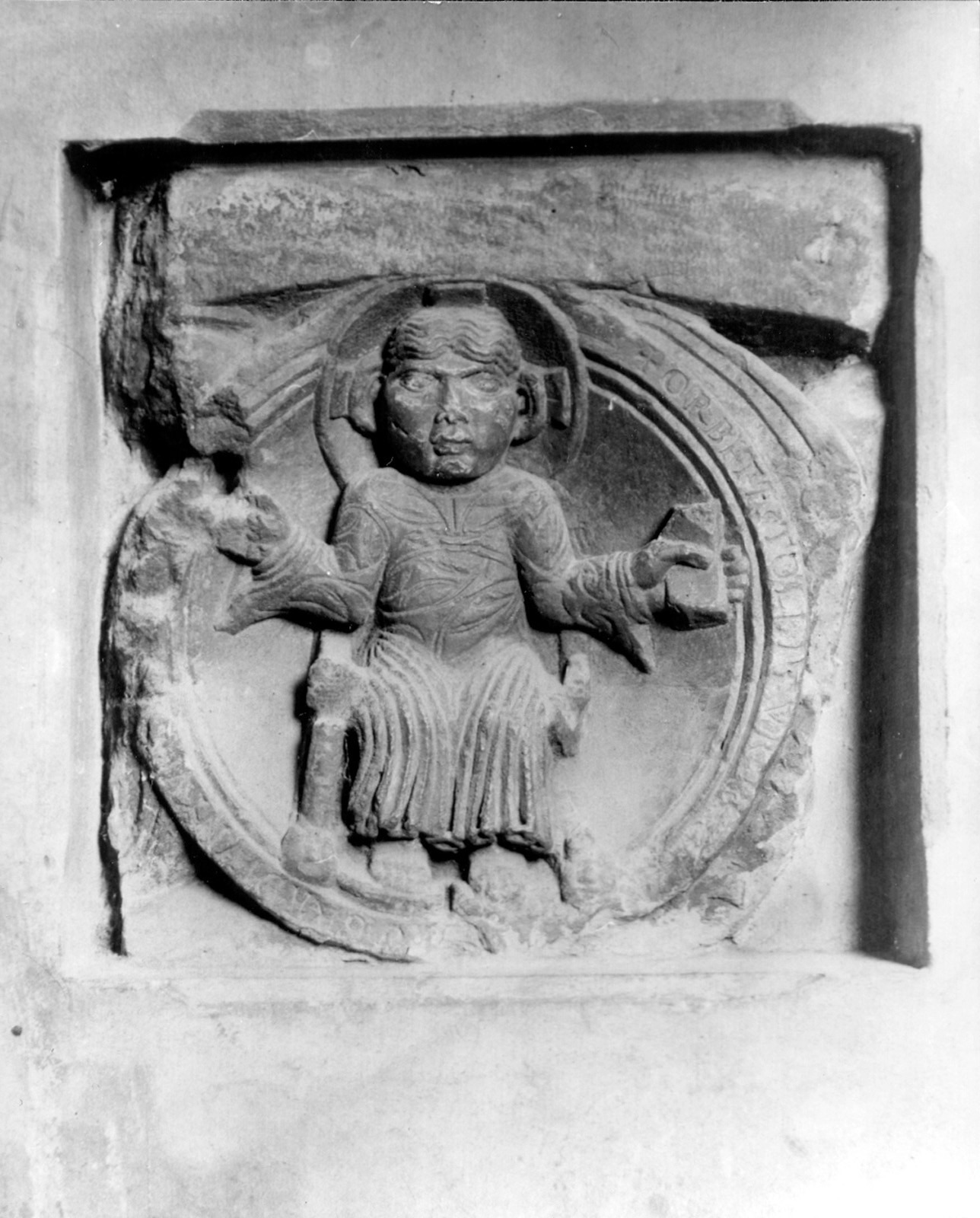
The Tabán Christ (Maiestas Domini) relief in 1904. At the time it was still located in the Church of Saint Catherine of Alexandria, set in the wall under the organ loft.

A few years later László Éber gave a detailed description, and called the relief "probably the oldest surviving [medieval] sculptural work" in the territory of Budapest. He identified it as part of a tympanum relief depicting the Last Judgement from the 12th century, belonging to an unknown church. Éber published a photograph that shows the relief in the Church of Saint Catherine where it was set in a recess of the wall, preserved as a historical relic. The fragmentary inscription was reconstructed by Éber as "Orbis terrarum tollitur, pauci cum eo gradiuntur". Nonetheless the reading of the inscription is disputed, and its meaning remains enigmatic.

In 1932 Henrik Horváth cast doubt on the traditional interpretation that the sculpture originally belonged to a tympanum relief, and claimed that size of the fragment was too small. He observed that the central medallion might have been surrounded by the symbols of the Evangelists. Three years later József Csemegi jr. connected the fragment to the decorated Romanesque church facades of France and Italy in a detailed art historical analysis noting the obvious similarities in style, iconography and spirit. Csemegi claimed that the Romanesque art of Southern France and Central Italy offered very close analogies to the Tabán relief especially regarding the folds of the tunic, the beardless face of Christ and other discernible elements of the Late Antique sculptural tradition. He dated the sculpture to the last decades of the 12th century, and suggested that it was part of a tympanum relief located above the carved lintel of a church portal. The structure might have been similar to the Romanesque portal of the Santa Fede Abbey in Cavagnolo, and the Christ medallion was only flanked by two symbols, the eagle of John and the angel of Matthew.

In a new analysis, Tibor Gerevich dated the relief to around 1130, and claimed that it might have been created by a Hungarian sculptor, trained in the French and Italian Romanesque sculptural tradition. He compared the sculpture to the Christ medallion on the south side portal of the San Michele Maggiore in Pavia but noted that the folds of the tunic are more similar to the stylized sculptural style inspired by the reliefs of the Basilica of Saint-Sernin in Toulouse.

The sculpture was removed from the Church of Saint Catherine after the building had been seriously damaged in the siege of Budapest. In 1946 the relief was first exhibited at a representative exhibition about the history of Budapest among other medieval artefacts in the Károlyi Palace. Two years later the relief became part of the permanent exhibition of medieval Hungarian sculpture in the Középkori Kőemléktár, a municipal lapidary museum which was reopened in 1948 in the northern tower of Fisherman's Bastion. In 1952 the sculpture was moved to the new Vármúzeum established in the Old Town Hall of Buda where an exhibition presented the history of Budapest. This museum was transferred to Building E of Buda Castle after the reconstruction of the former Royal Palace where the Budapest History Museum opened a representative exhibition about the history of Budapest in 1968. The Tabán Christ has been part of the permanent exhibition of the museum ever since.

In 1978 the most influential expert on medieval Hungarian art, Ernő Marosi proposed a wholly new explanation about the origin of the fragment based on technical and stylistic analysis. He claimed that the relief belongs to a group of high quality sculptural works originating from the Provostry Church of Saint Peter in Óbuda dated to around 1150. The fragments of this ensemble were scattered in the territory in Buda and even further. Marosi suggested that the Tabán Christ was probably part of a sculpture relief that decorated the chancel screen, and criticised the Budapest History Museum which still presented the sculpture as a portal relief on its new permanent exhibition in 1993. The hypothesis was accepted by a number of art historians, and later it was proposed that the relief might have belonged to a smaller portal together with another figural fragment.
