= Jakab Marastoni =

Italian-born Hungarian painter (1804–1860)

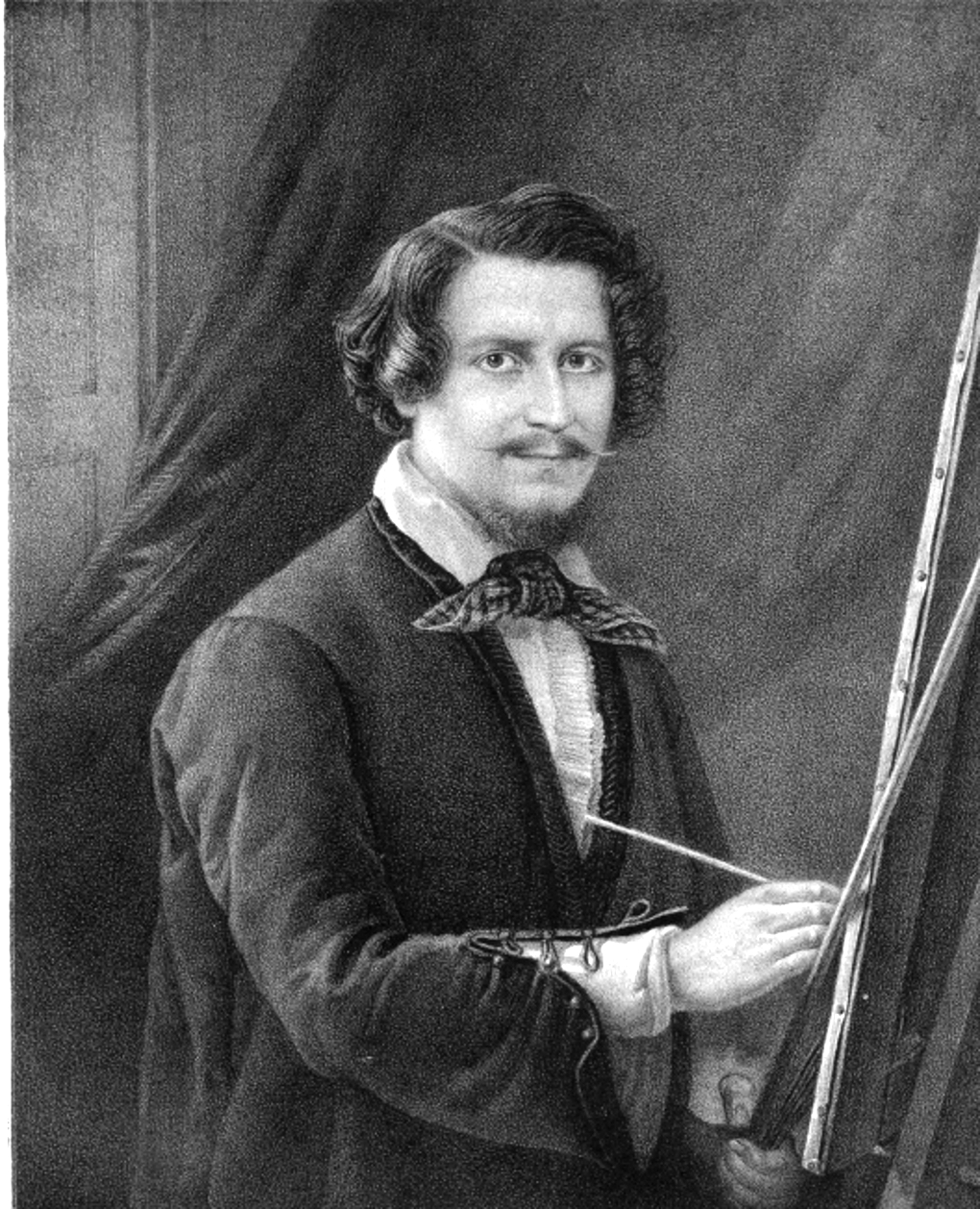
Jakab Marastoni; lithograph from a self-portrait (date unknown)

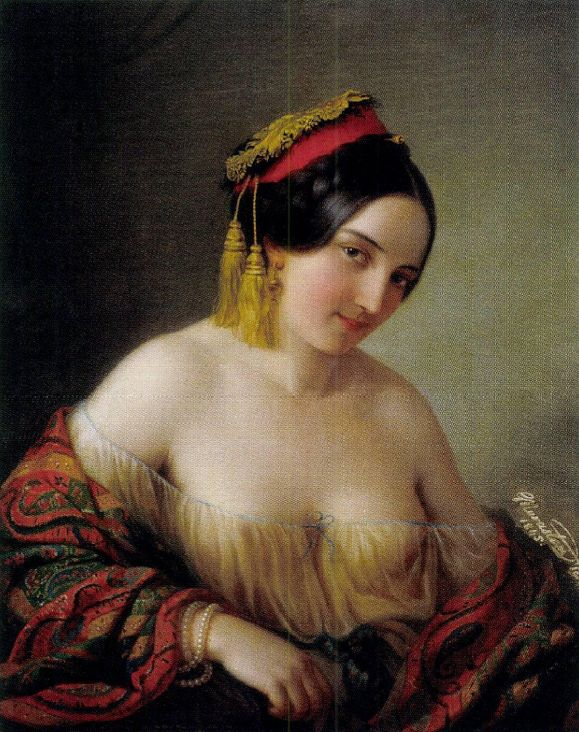
Greek Woman (1845)

Jakab Marastoni, originally Jacopo Antonio Marastoni (24 March 1804, Venice – 11 July 1860, Pest) was a portrait painter and lithographer in the Austrian Empire.

== Biography ==
In 1830, he began his studies in Rome. He settled in Pest in 1836, having come by way of Vienna and Pressburg. He soon became a much sought-after portrait painter.

In 1846, he created the Első Magyar Festészeti Akadémiát (First Hungarian Academy of Painting) which, as the name suggests, was the first school in Hungary devoted exclusively to painting. It was a private school, but numbered András Fáy, Gábor Döbrentei and Archduke Stephen, Palatine of Hungary among its patrons and supporters. The school also sold shares to the general public. Károly Lotz, Mihály Zichy, Soma Orlai Petrich and Mihály Kovács were some of the school's best-known students. Shortly after founding the school, Marastoni was named an Honorary Citizen of Pest.

In his later years, he became Hungary's first professional Daguerrotypist. In 1859, his health began to deteriorate rapidly and he had to give up teaching. He soon went blind, and died in a mental institution. The school was closed shortly thereafter.

His son, Josef Marastoni, was also a well-known painter and lithographer in Vienna.
