= Gellért =

Gellért or Gellert may refer to:

== People ==
- Christian Fürchtegott Gellert (1715–1769), German poet
- Christlieb Ehregott Gellert (1713–1795), German metallurgist
- Dina Gellert (born 1961), Danish children's book illustrator
- Gayelord Hauser, born Helmut Eugen Benjamin Gellert Hauser (Tübingen, Germany 1895 – North Hollywood, California 1984), American nutritionist and self-help writer
- Hugo Gellert (1892–1985), Hungarian-American illustrator and muralist
- Imre Gellért (1888–1981), Hungarian gymnast
- Jay Gellert (born 1956), American CEO
- Lawrence Gellert (1898–1979), American music collector
- Rayna Gellert (born 1976), American fiddler
- Gellért Ivancsics (born 1987), Hungarian soccer player
- Gellert Tamas (born 1963), Swedish writer
- Saint Gellért, the name by which the Hungarian bishop Gerard Sagredo (980–1046) is commonly known

== Other uses ==
- Gellert Grindelwald (1882–1998), a character from the Harry Potter franchise
- Gellért Hill, a hill in Budapest, Hungary
  - Gellért Hill Cave, a cave in Gellért Hill which contains a church
  - Gellért Hill Calvary, a Late Baroque calvary on Gellért Hill
- Hotel Gellért, a hotel in Budapest, Hungary
  - Gellért Baths, baths at the hotel
- Geraltov (Hungarian: Gellért), a village and municipality in the Prešov Region of eastern Slovakia

== See also ==
- Gelert (disambiguation)
