= Gelert (disambiguation) =

Gelert, also spelled Gellert or Killhart, was a 13th-century dog of Welsh fable.

Gelert may also refer to:

- Gelert (company), a company selling outdoor equipment
- Elżbieta Gelert (born 1955), Polish politician
- Otto Gelert (1862–1899), Danish botanist and pharmacist
- Saint Gelert (7th century), probable founder of Beddgelert and Llangeler, in Wales
- Gelert's Farm Works, British railway operating center
- Gelert's Farm halt, British railway platform
- Gelert, a type of pet in Neopets

== See also ==
- Gellert (disambiguation)
