= Liberty Statue (Budapest) =

Monument on the Gellért Hill in Hungary

Coordinates: 47°29′11″N 19°02′53″E

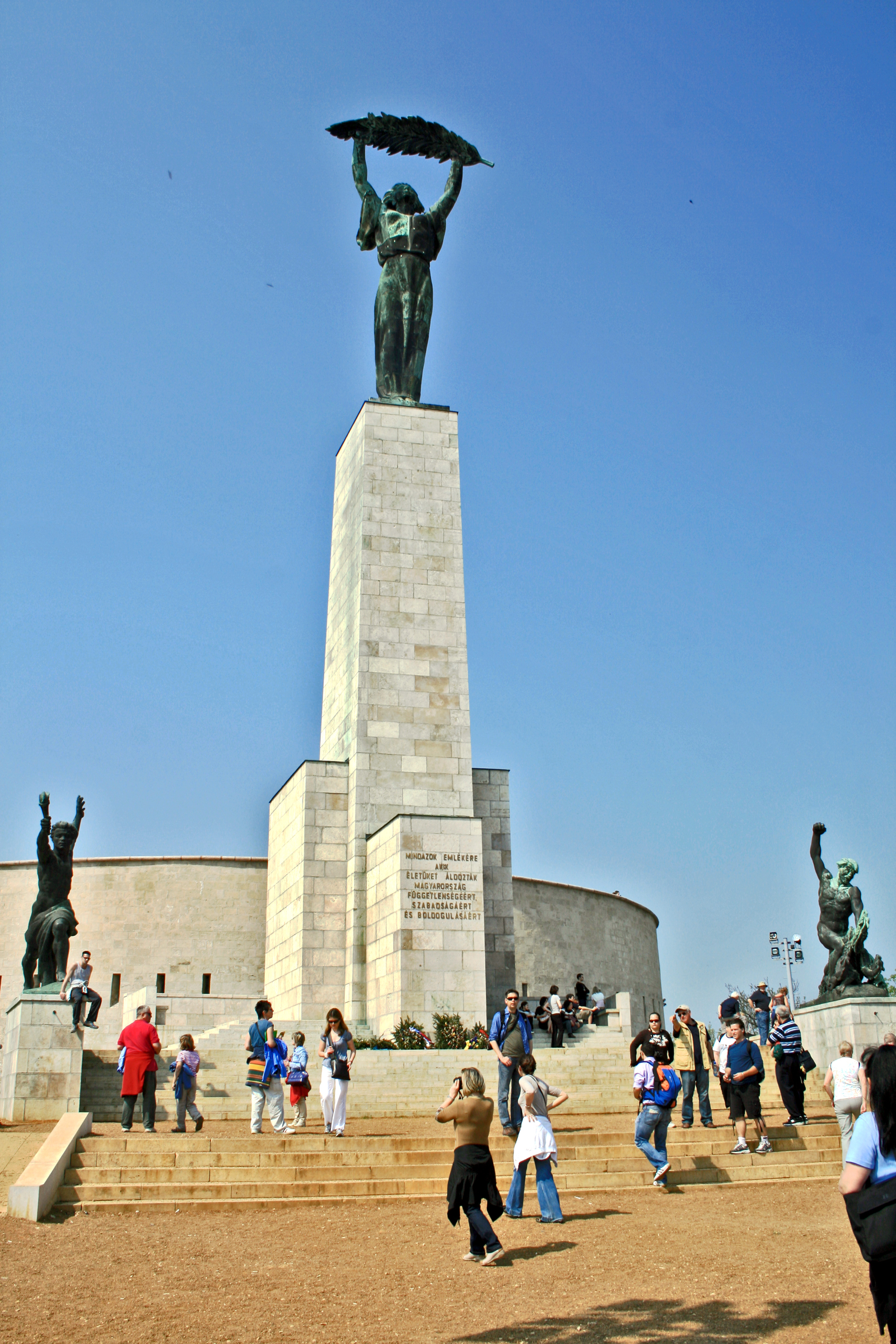
The Liberty Statue on the Gellért Hill.

The Liberty Statue, also called Freedom Statue (Hungarian: Szabadság-szobor [ˈsɒbɒtt͡ʃaːɡ ˈsobor]), is a monument at the east end of the Citadella on Gellért Hill in Budapest, Hungary. It commemorates those who sacrificed their lives for the independence, freedom, and prosperity of Hungary.

== History ==
It was first erected in 1947 in remembrance of Soviet troops ending the Hungary's occupation by Nazi Germany during World War II. Its location upon Gellért Hill makes it a prominent feature of Budapest's cityscape.

The 14 m tall bronze statue stands atop a 26 m pedestal and holds a palm leaf. Two smaller statues are also present around the base, but the original monument consisted of two more originally that have since been removed from the site and relocated to Memento Park. The monument was designed by Zsigmond Kisfaludi Strobl. According to Kisfaludi Strobl, the design was originally made for the memorial of István Horthy and would in that role have featured a human child instead of the palm leaf that was a Soviet addition.

At the time of the monument's construction, the defeat of Axis forces by the Red Army was officially proclaimed “liberation”—leading to the original inscription upon the memorial (both in Hungarian and Russian):

A FELSZABADÍTÓ
SZOVJET HŐSÖK
EMLÉKÉRE
A HÁLÁS MAGYAR NÉP
1945
ОСВОБОДИТЕЛЯМ
СОВЕТСКИМ ГЕРОЯМ
ОТ
БЛАГОДАРНОГО
ВЕНГЕРСКОГО НАРОДА

which can be translated to read, "To the memory of the liberating Soviet heroes [erected by] the grateful Hungarian people [in] 1945".

Over the following years, public sentiment toward the Soviets decreased to the point of revolution, which was attempted and temporarily succeeded in 1956 and subsequently damaged some portions of the monument. After the 1989 transition from communist rule to democracy, the inscription was modified to read:

MINDAZOK EMLÉKÉRE
AKIK
ÉLETÜKET ÁLDOZTÁK
MAGYARORSZÁG
FÜGGETLENSÉGÉÉRT,
SZABADSÁGÁÉRT
ÉS BOLDOGULÁSÁÉRT

Translated from Hungarian: "To the memory of those all who sacrificed their lives for the independence, freedom, and prosperity of Hungary". The Russian-language version of the tribute was removed in its entirety.

After a 2025 renovation, a Christian cross will be placed at the base of the statue.

== From the city ==
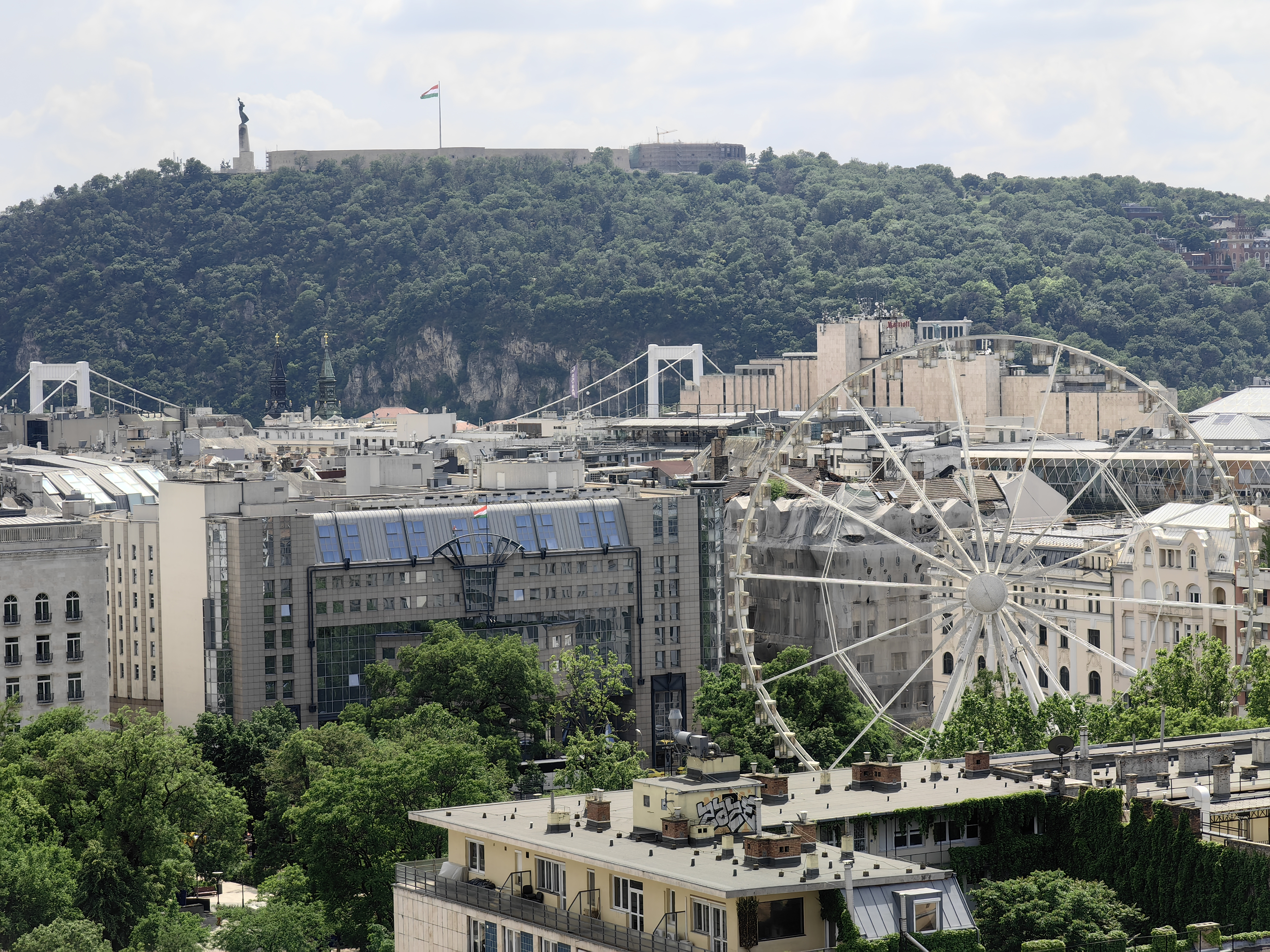
From Saint Stephen's Basilica

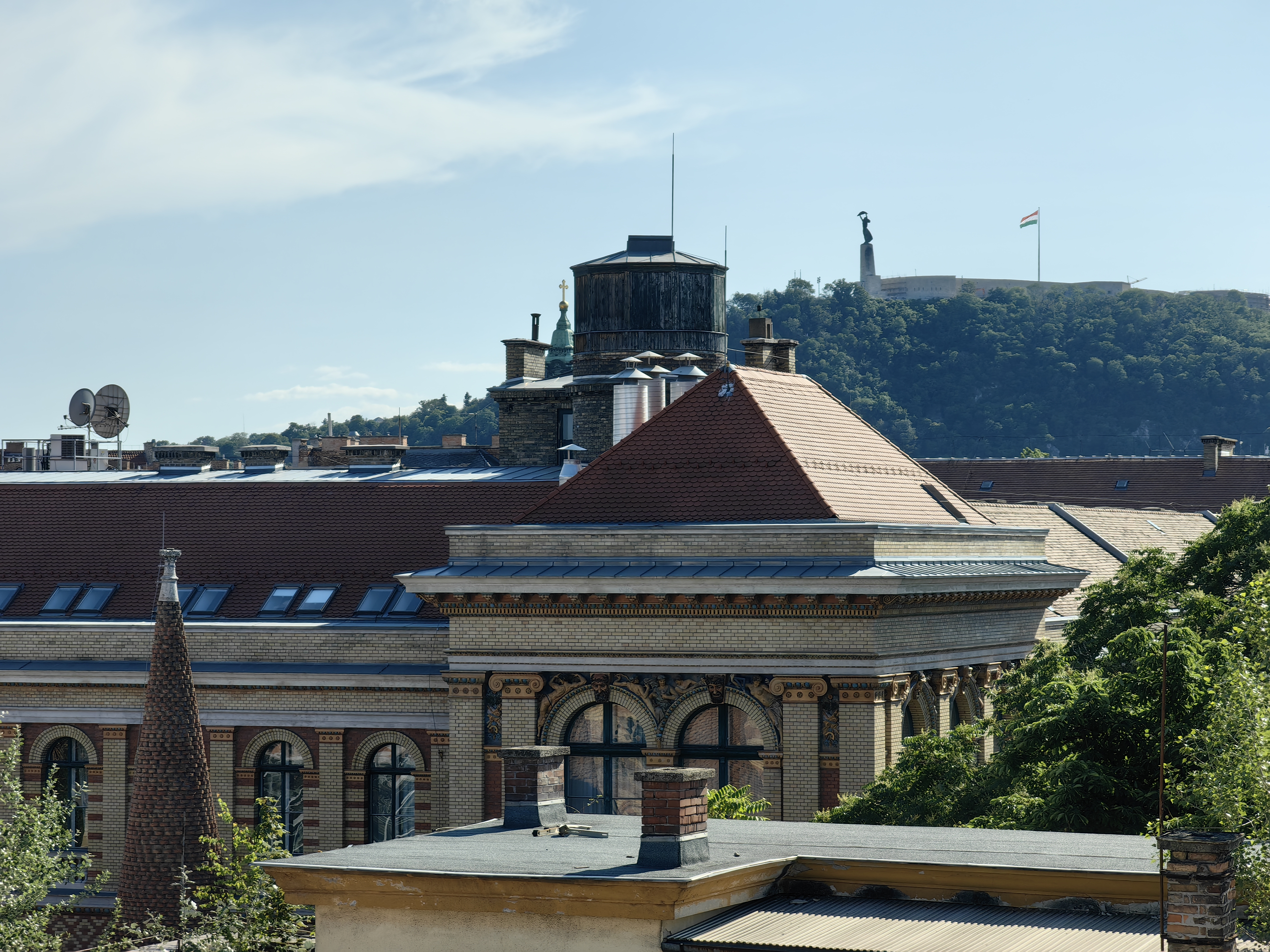
From ELTE Trefort garden

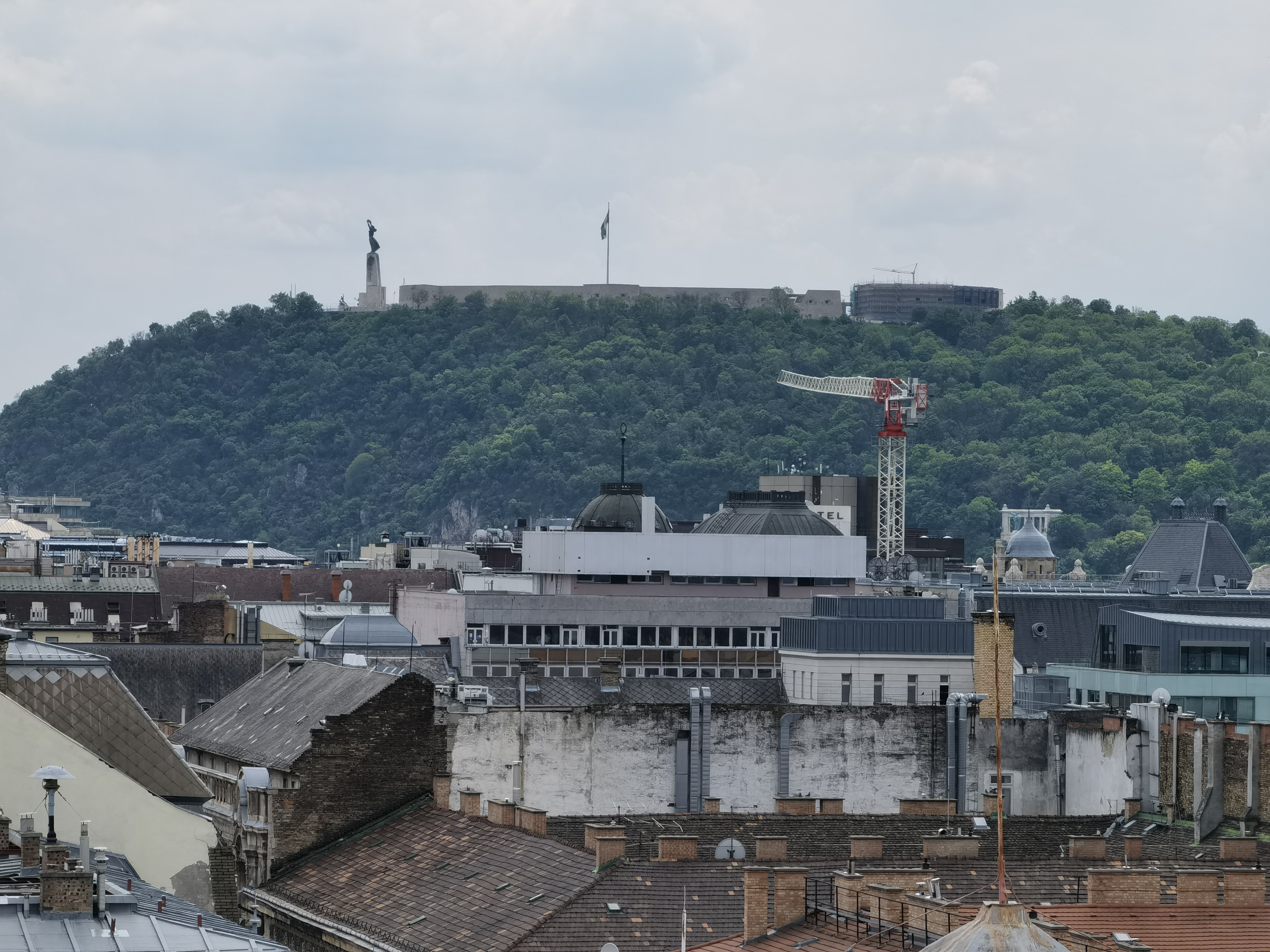
From Stock Exchange Palace

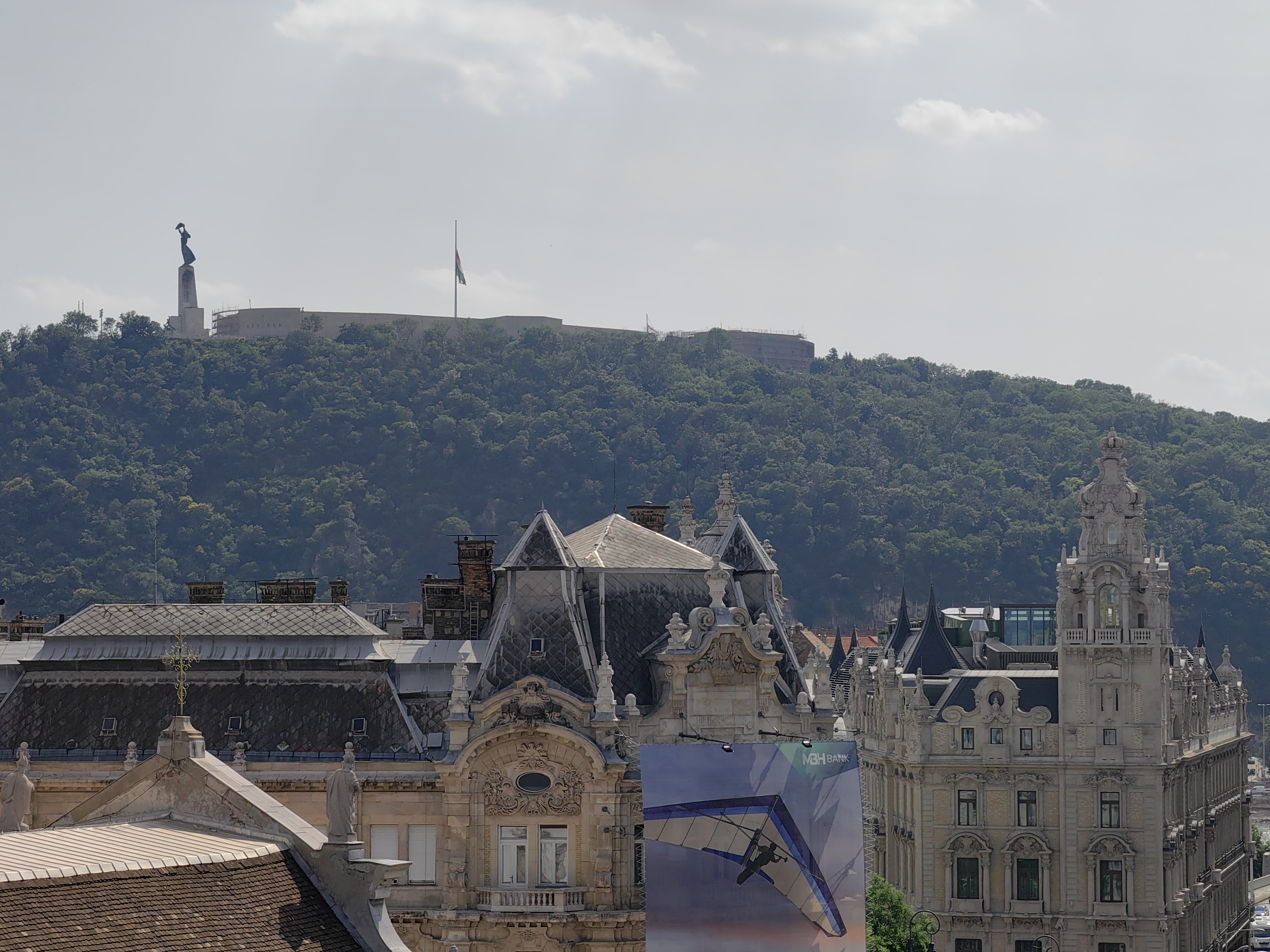
From Városház utca 1.

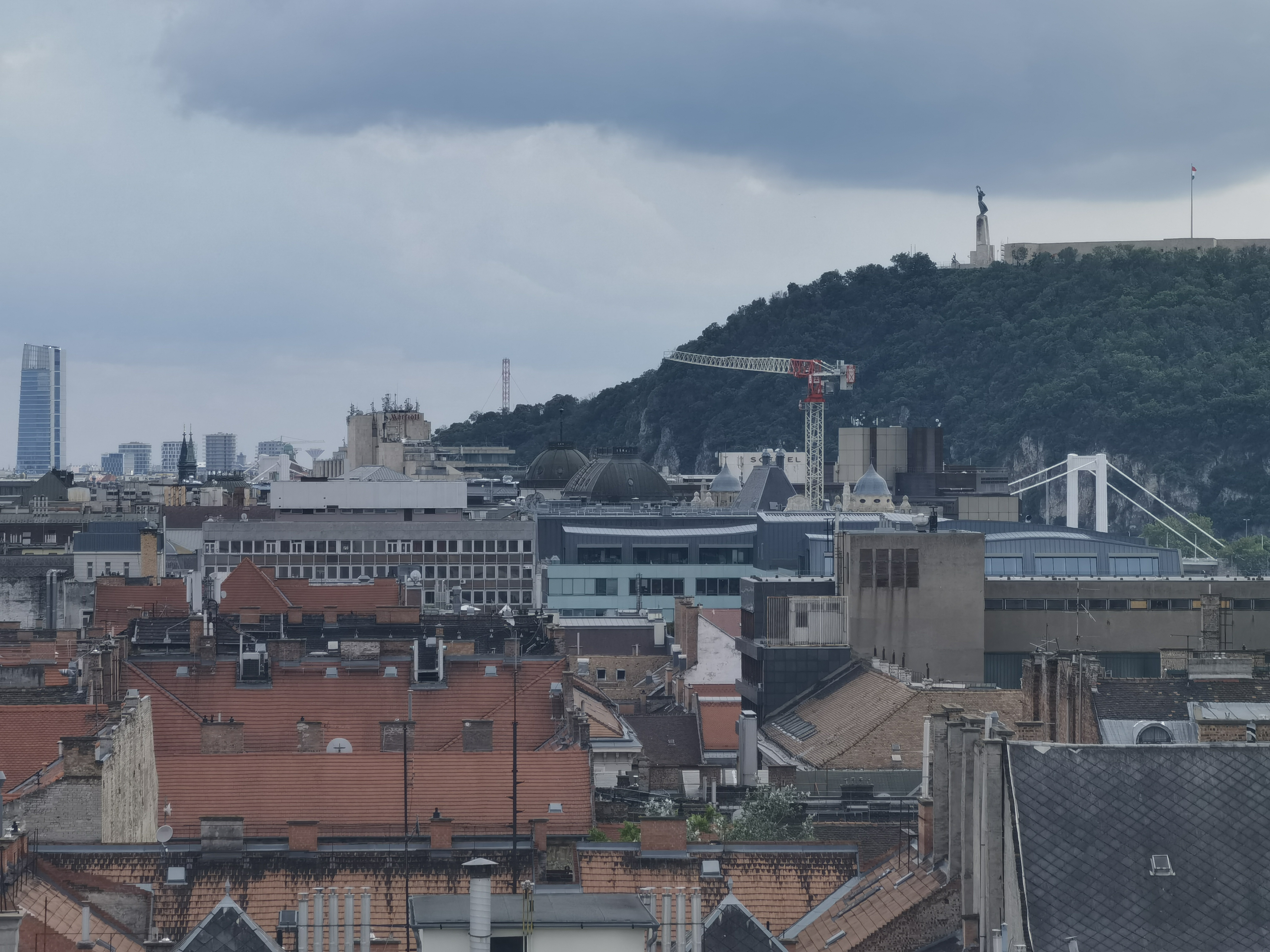
From Vértanúk tere 1.

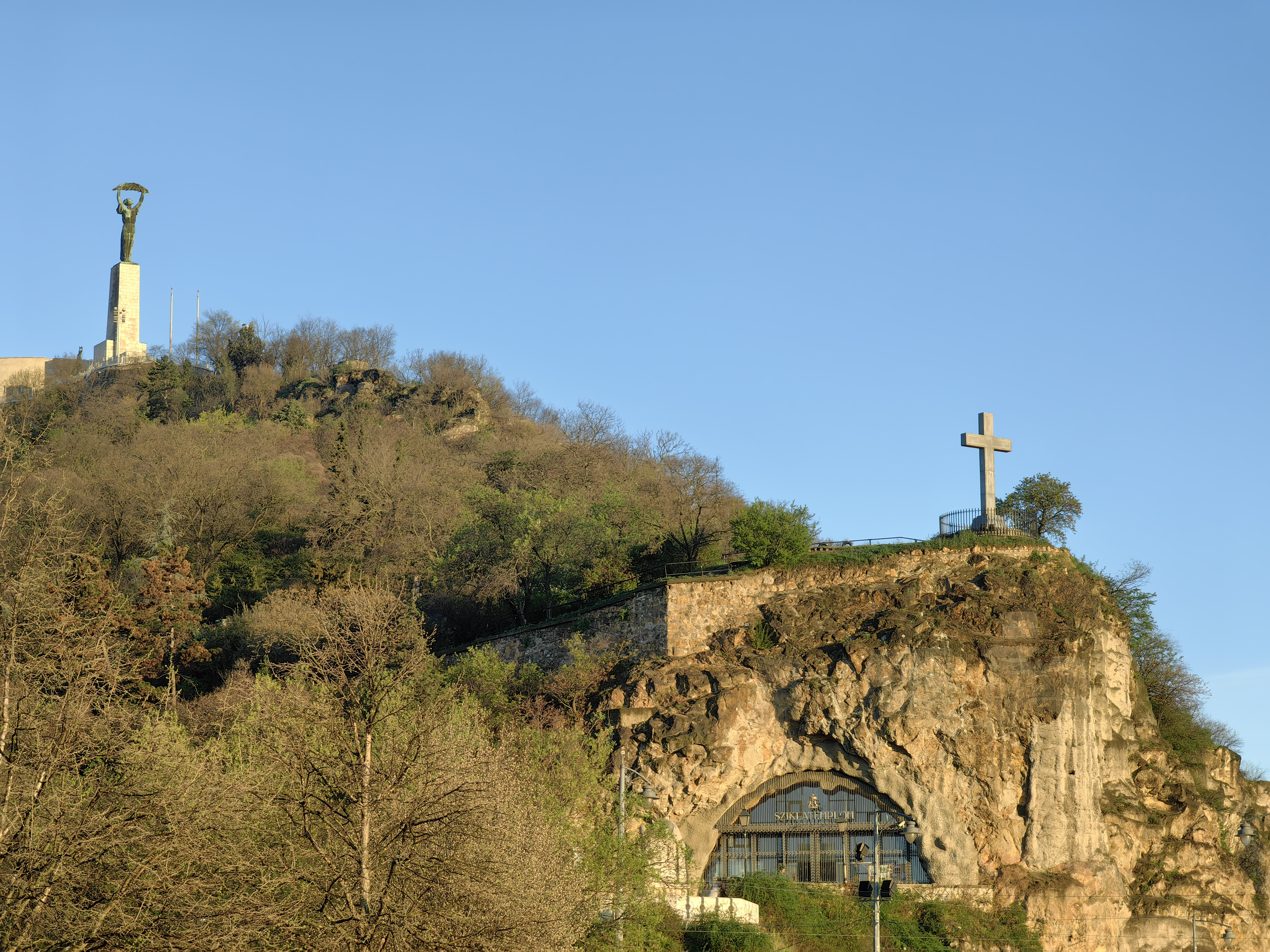
With Sziklatemplom

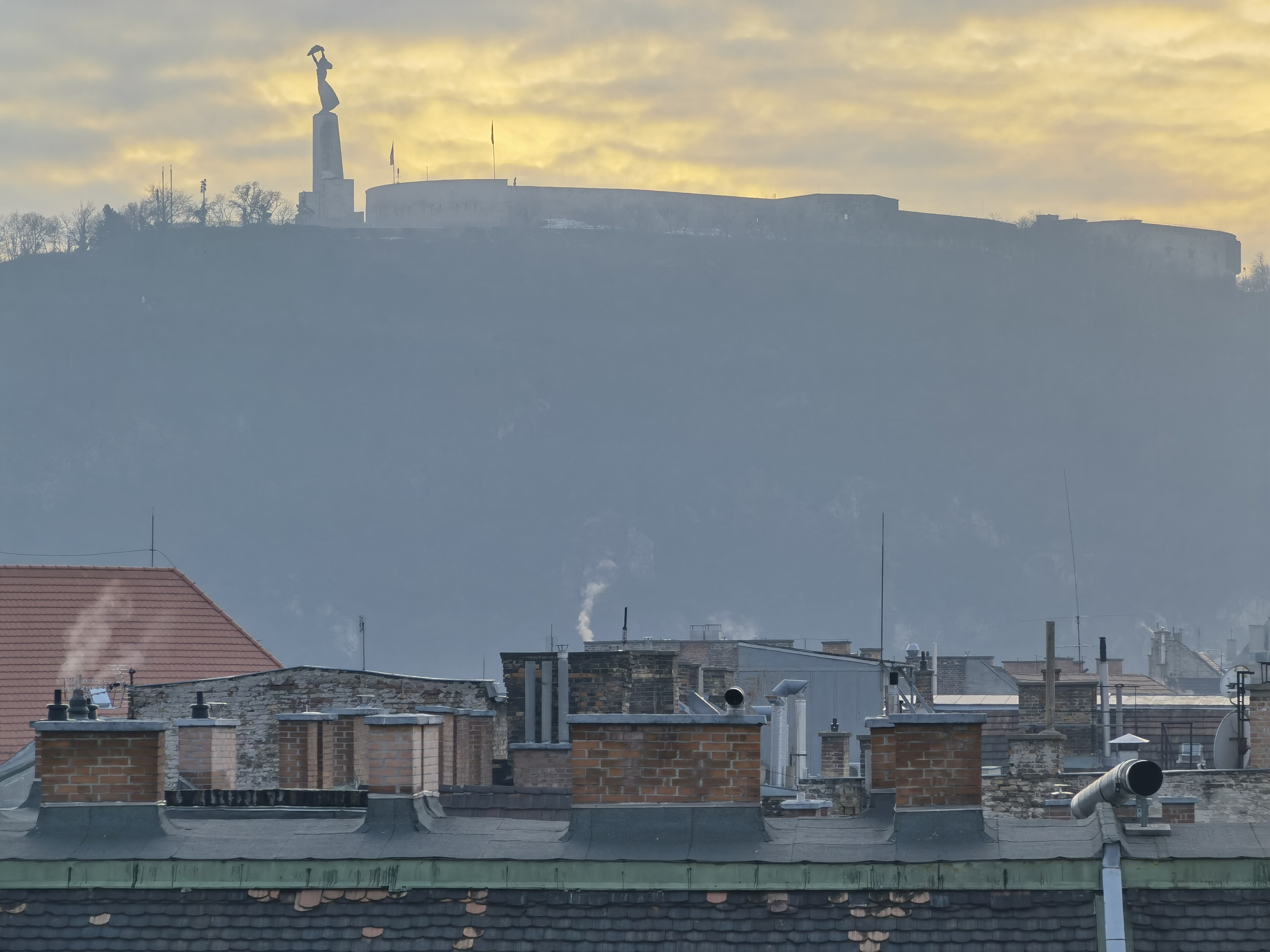
From ELTE library

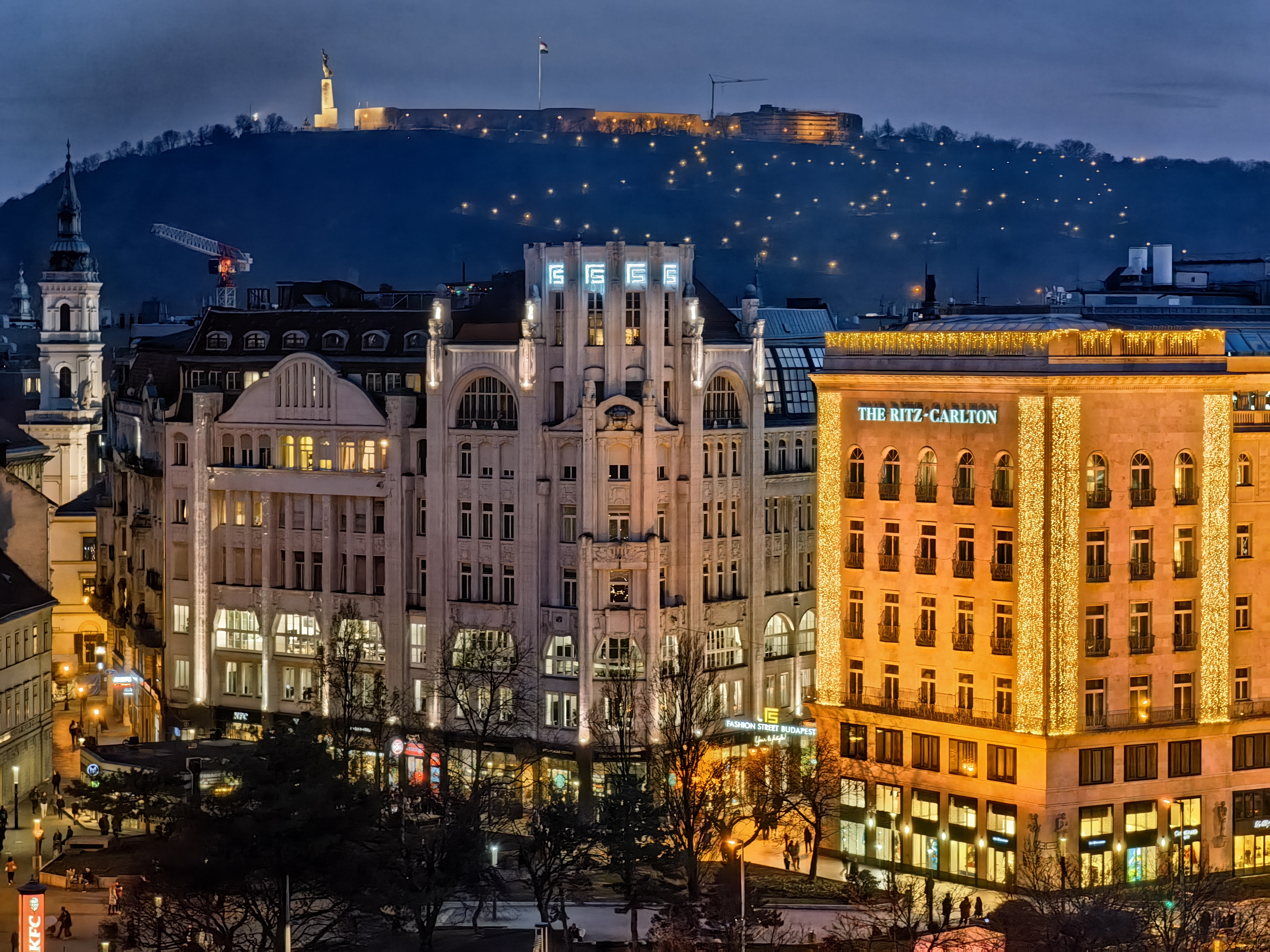
From Bajcsy-Zsilinszky út 9.

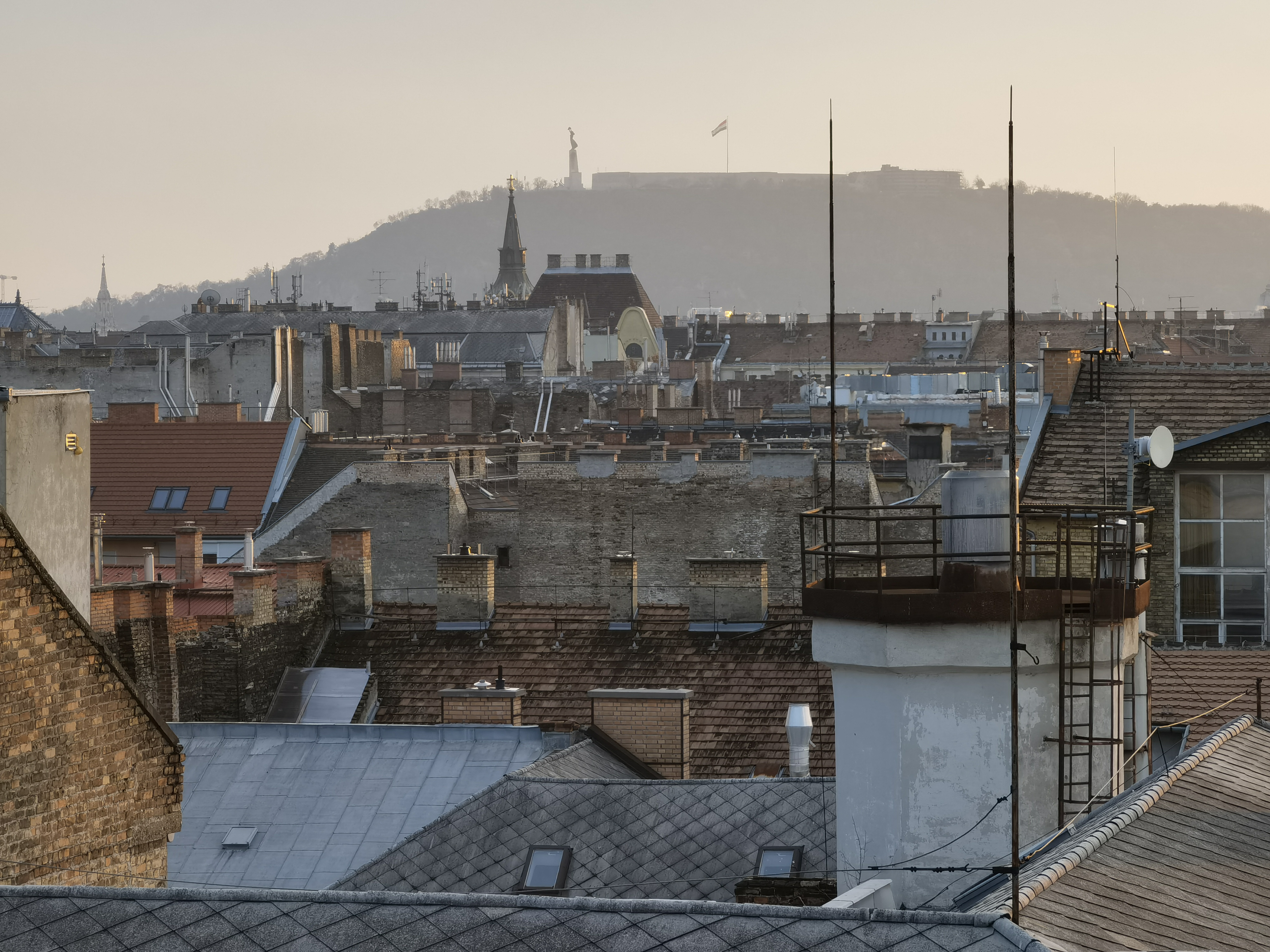
From EX MÁV headquarters

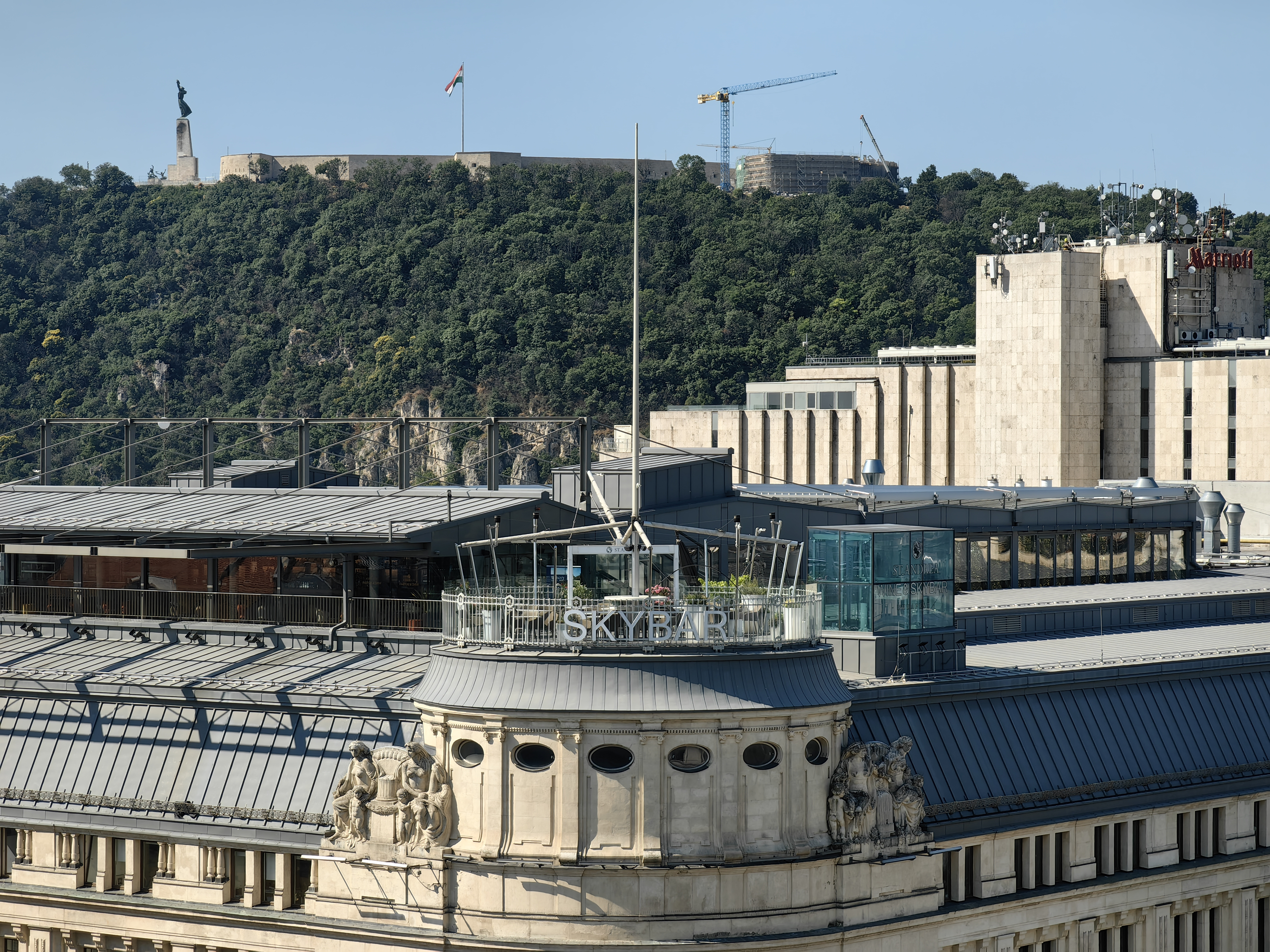
From Vörösmarty tér

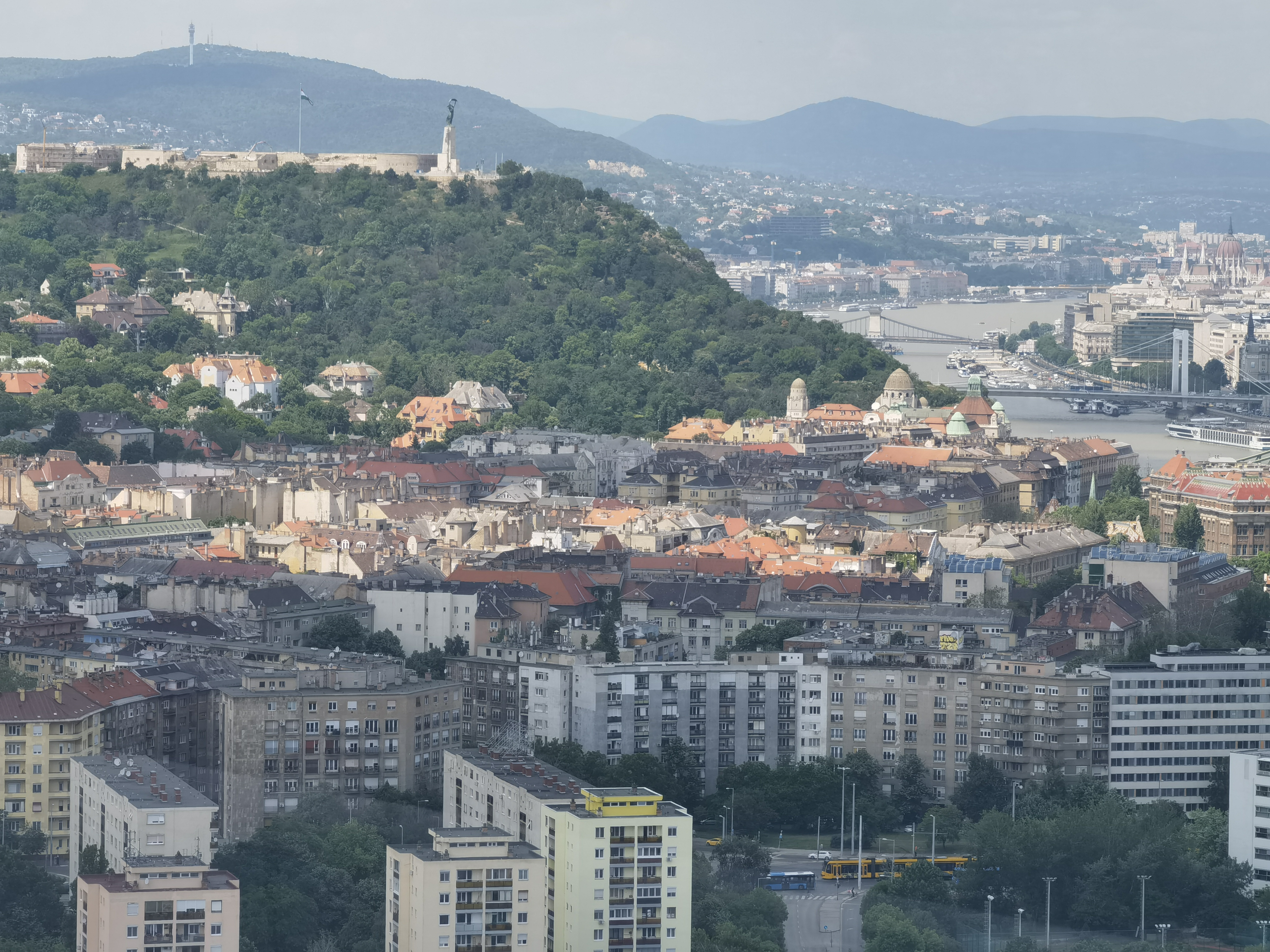
From MOL Campus

== See also ==
- Hungary during World War II
- People's Republic of Hungary
- Hungarian Revolution of 1956
- List of tallest statues
