= Citadella =

Fortification in Budapest, Hungary

Coordinates: 47°29′13″N 19°02′47″E

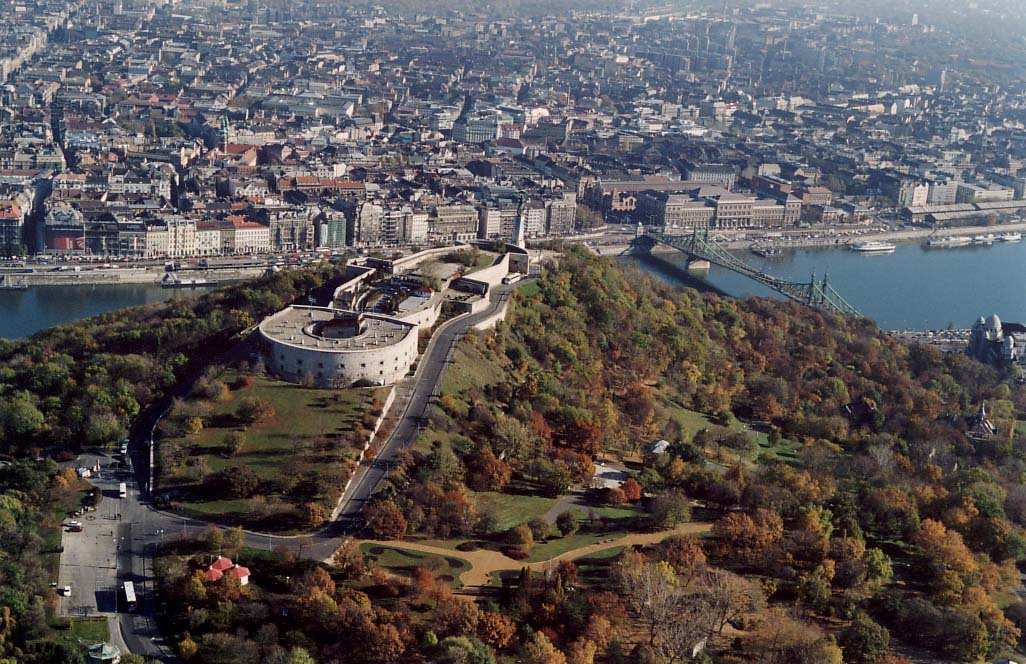
The Citadella upon Gellért Hill, Budapest.

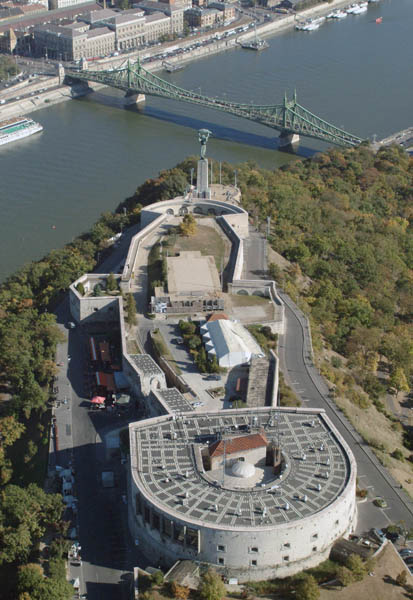
The Citadella from above.

The Citadella (Hungarian pronunciation: [ˈt͡sitɒdɛlːa]) is the fortification located upon the top of Gellért Hill in Budapest, Hungary. Citadella is the Hungarian word for citadel, a kind of fortress. The word is exclusively used by other languages to refer to the Gellért Hill citadel which occupies a place which held strategic importance in Budapest's military history.

== History ==
The fortress was built in 1851 by Julius Jacob von Haynau, a commander of the Austrian Empire, and was designed by Emmanuel Zitta and Ferenc Kasselik, after the Hungarian Revolution of 1848. It occupies almost the entire 235 metres high plateau. The fortress is a U-shaped structure built about a central courtyard, being 220 metres long, 60 metres wide, and 4 metres tall. It had a complement of sixty cannons.

Actually built by Hungarian forced labourers, it was finished in 1854. In June 1854 Austrian troops settled in the citadel. After the Austro-Hungarian Compromise of 1867 and the establishment of Austria-Hungary, the Hungarians demanded the destruction of the Citadel, but the garrison troops left only in 1897, when the main gate was symbolically damaged. It was not until late 1899 when the city took possession of the Citadel. A few months later, in 1900, the walls were demolished.

In the Hungarian Revolution of 1956, Soviet troops occupied the Citadella and fired down into the city during the assault that overthrew the Nagy-led Hungarian government.

On 5 April 2026, the Citadella was reopened following years of renovations.

== Sights ==
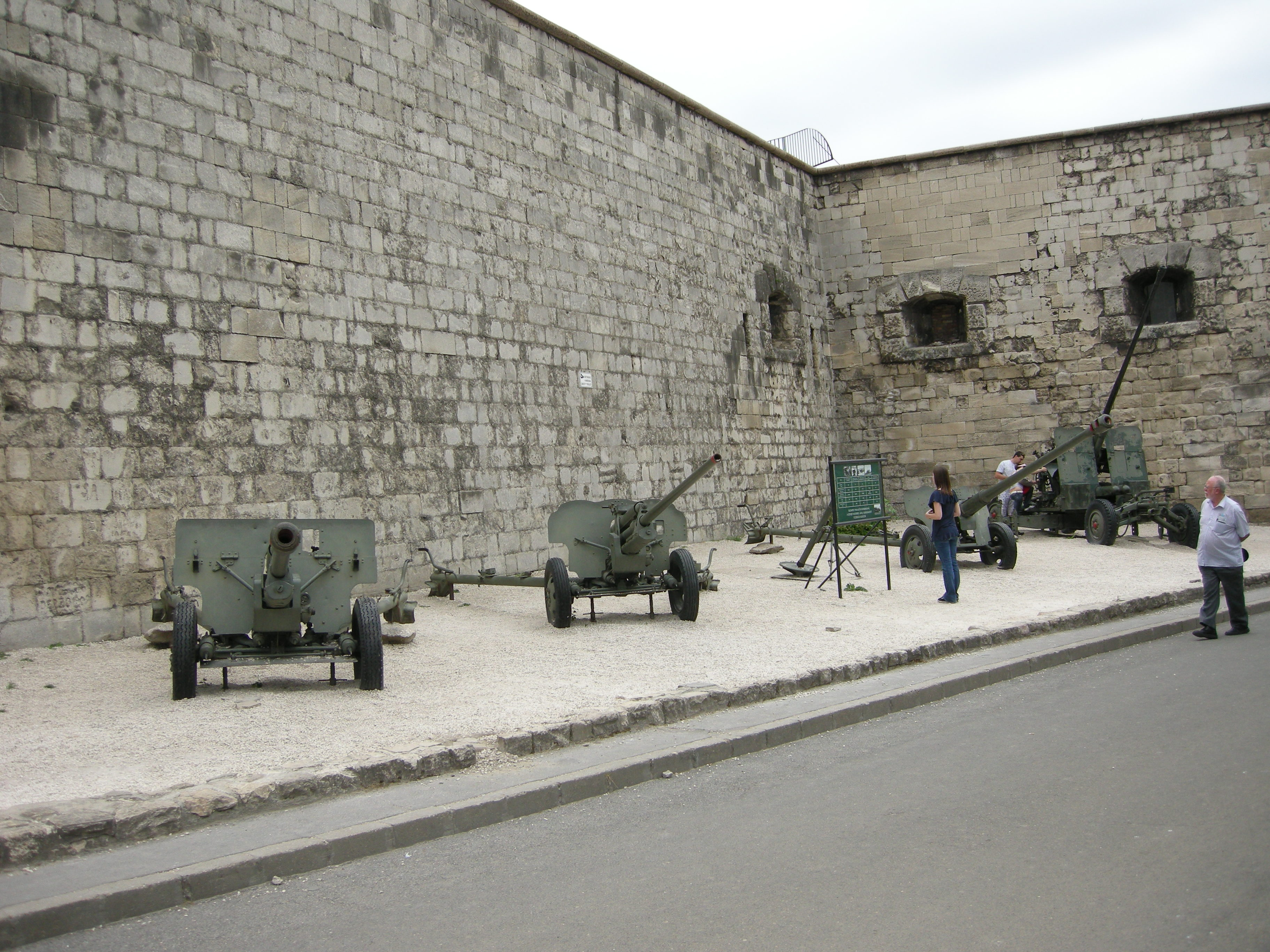
Weapons next to the Citadella.

Next to the Danube-facing longitudinal wall of the Citadella, there is an open-air display of a small collection of Red Army weaponry, most of them from the Second World War. The pieces are the following (going left to right on the picture):

- a 76 mm M1942 divisional gun (ZiS-3), a design from 1942
- a 57 mm M1943 anti-tank gun (ZiS-2), a design from 1943
- an 82 mm BM-37 infantry mortar, a design from 1937
- an 85 mm D-44 divisional gun, a design from 1944
- a 57 mm AZP S-60 anti-aircraft autocannon, a design from 1950

From the top of the Citadel, a panoramic view is available of the city, the Danube and its eight bridges. At the east end of the complex is the Liberty Statue.
