= Gellért Hill Calvary =

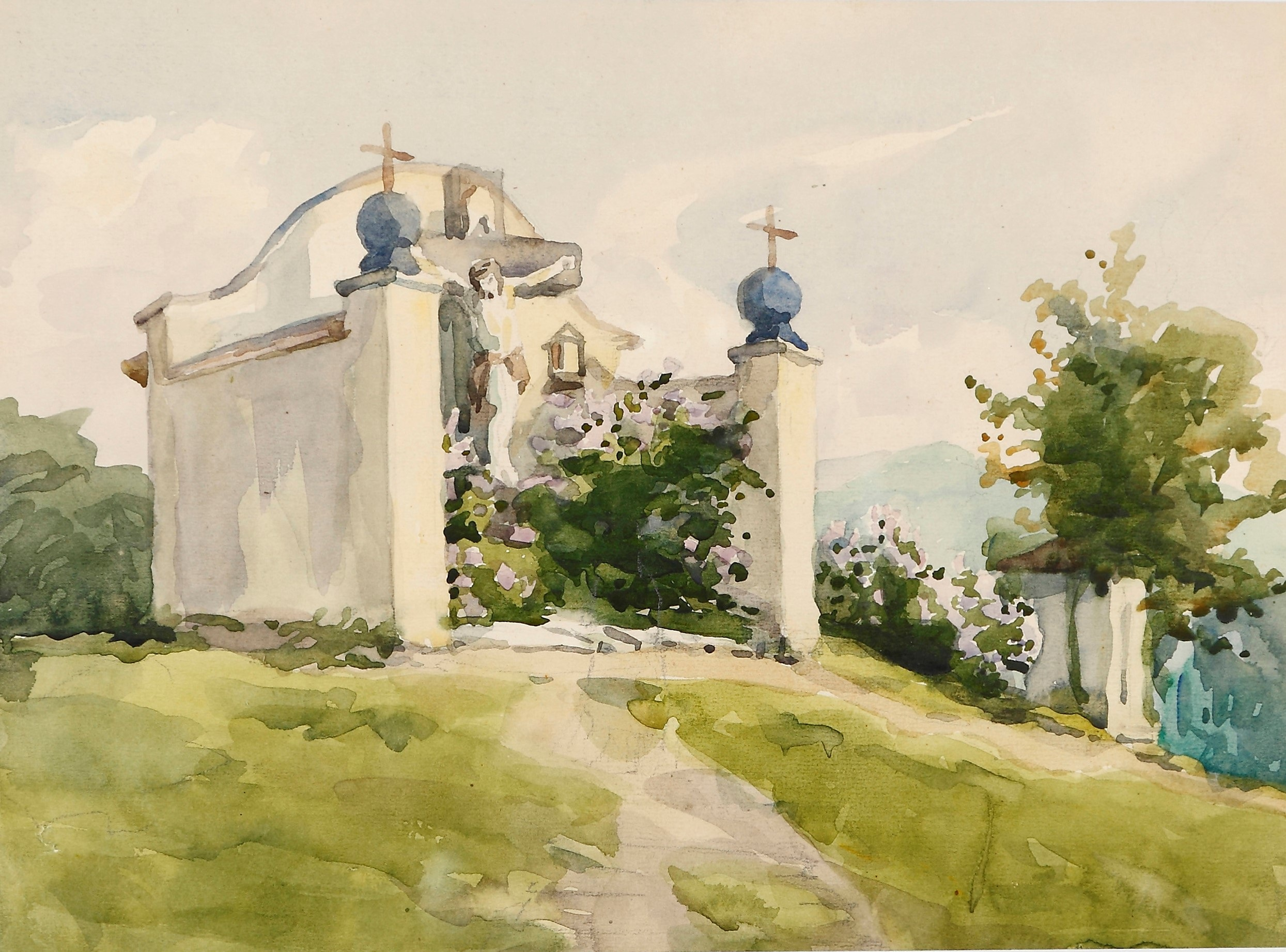
The calvary on György Haller's painting (c. 1910)

Gellért Hill Calvary (Hungarian: Gellért-hegyi kálvária) was a Late Baroque calvary on Gellért Hill, Budapest which was demolished around 1950.

== History ==
The first calvary on Gellért Hill was built in 1715 by a citizen of Buda on the initiative of the Jesuit Order. The simple structure was made up of two stone sculptures and a wooden crucifix. In 1795 Mihály Füll (or Fühl) launched a public fundraising to build a new monument replacing the old one which was already decaying. The magistrate of Buda supported the initiative but it took decades to realize. In 1822 the calvary was described as "recentius a Cive Michaele Fühl exstructa" (recently built by Mihály Fühl). The road to the new sculpture group was lined by stations whose paintings depicted the sufferings of Christ.

On Easter Mondays a procession climbed the steep path leading to the calvary to celebrate Christ's resurrection. Tents and vendors were erected on a nearby meadow. The emmausjárás (Emmaus-walk) or tojásbúcsú (egg feast) was one of the most popular Catholic holidays of the year during the 18-19th centuries. In 1873 the citizens of the Tabán district repaired a few stations and decorated them with new paintings, painted on wood by „C. Sauer”. Many stations were demolished in the 1920s. Only three of them were still standing in the 1930s. The last photo showing the decaying structure was published in 1943. The calvary was demolished around 1950.

== Description ==
The calvary stood in a very small, rectangular courtyard surrounded by brick walls. The front side was closed by a wooden gate between two brick pillars. The pillars were crowned with iron crosses mounted on stone balls. The back wall was arched. The stone crucifix of the calvary was 3.5 m high and it was surrounded by three painted stone sculptures: Mary Magdalene kneeling, the Virgin Mary and John the Apostle standing. There was wooden niche behind the calvary symbolizing the Holy Sepulchre with two wooden angels.

== Sources ==
- Horler Miklós: Budapest műemlékei, 1962
