= Elżbieta Gelert =

Polish politician (born 1955)

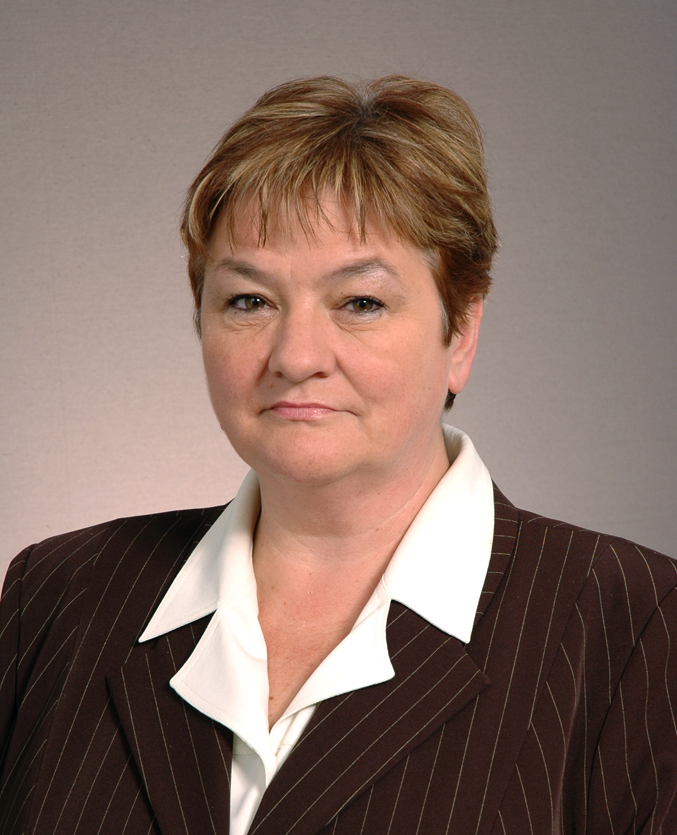
Elżbieta Gelert in 2005

Elżbieta Kazimiera Gelert (born 22 April 1955) is a Polish politician, representing Civic Platform.

== Biography ==
Gelert was born on 22 April 1955 in Gdańsk. In 1984, she graduated from the Faculty of Nursing at Poznań University of Medical Sciences. In 1997, she completed specialization in hospital and public health management at the Jagiellonian University Public Health Institute in Kraków.

From 1992–1993, Gelert was the secretary of the Regional Chamber of Nurses and Midwives in Elbląg. She was also Chairperson of the Union of Hospitals Providing Employment in the Warmia and Mazury Region.

Gelert was member of the Conservative People's Party – a conservative/popular party. After its Elbląg section dissolved, she joined the Civic Platform political party. From 2002–2005, Gelert was a member of Elbląg City Council. From 2005–2006, she was member of Polish Senate for Electoral District No. 33 based in Elbląg.

In 2006, Gelert failed in bid to be elected mayor of Elbląg. However, she was elected to Elbląg City Council. Under current Polish law, specifically the Parliamentary and Senate Representation of the People Act, any member of parliament or senate who is elected to local office must resign their national post. Therefore Ms. Gelert was stripped of her position in the senate and thus a by-election must be held in Electoral District No. 33, the estimated cost of which is 1.8 million PLN (€450,000).
