= Gellért Hill Cave =

Cave in Budapest, Hungary

Coordinates: 47°29′6.38″N 19°3′7.12″E

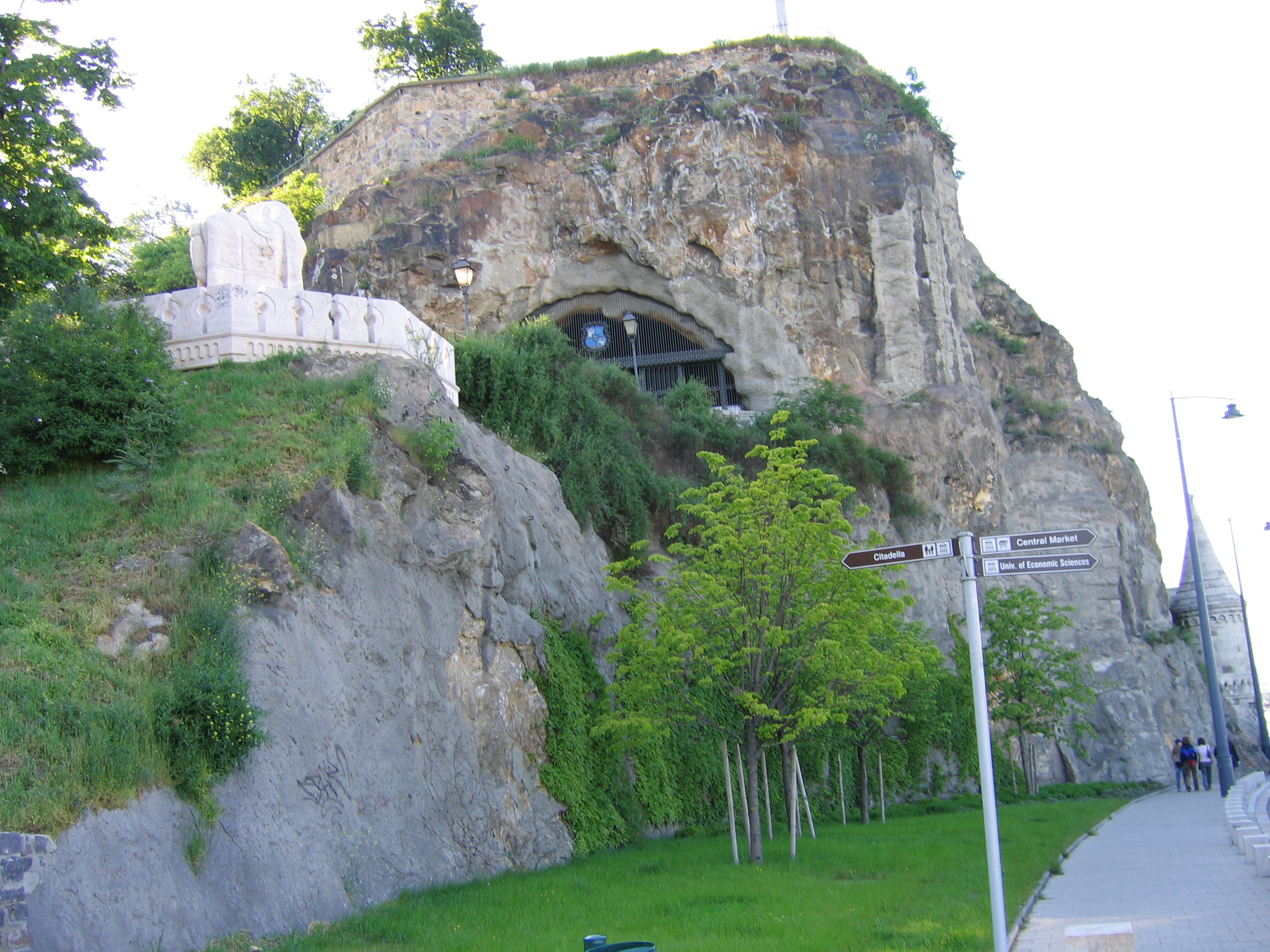
The main entrance to the cave, as viewed from the Danube waterfront

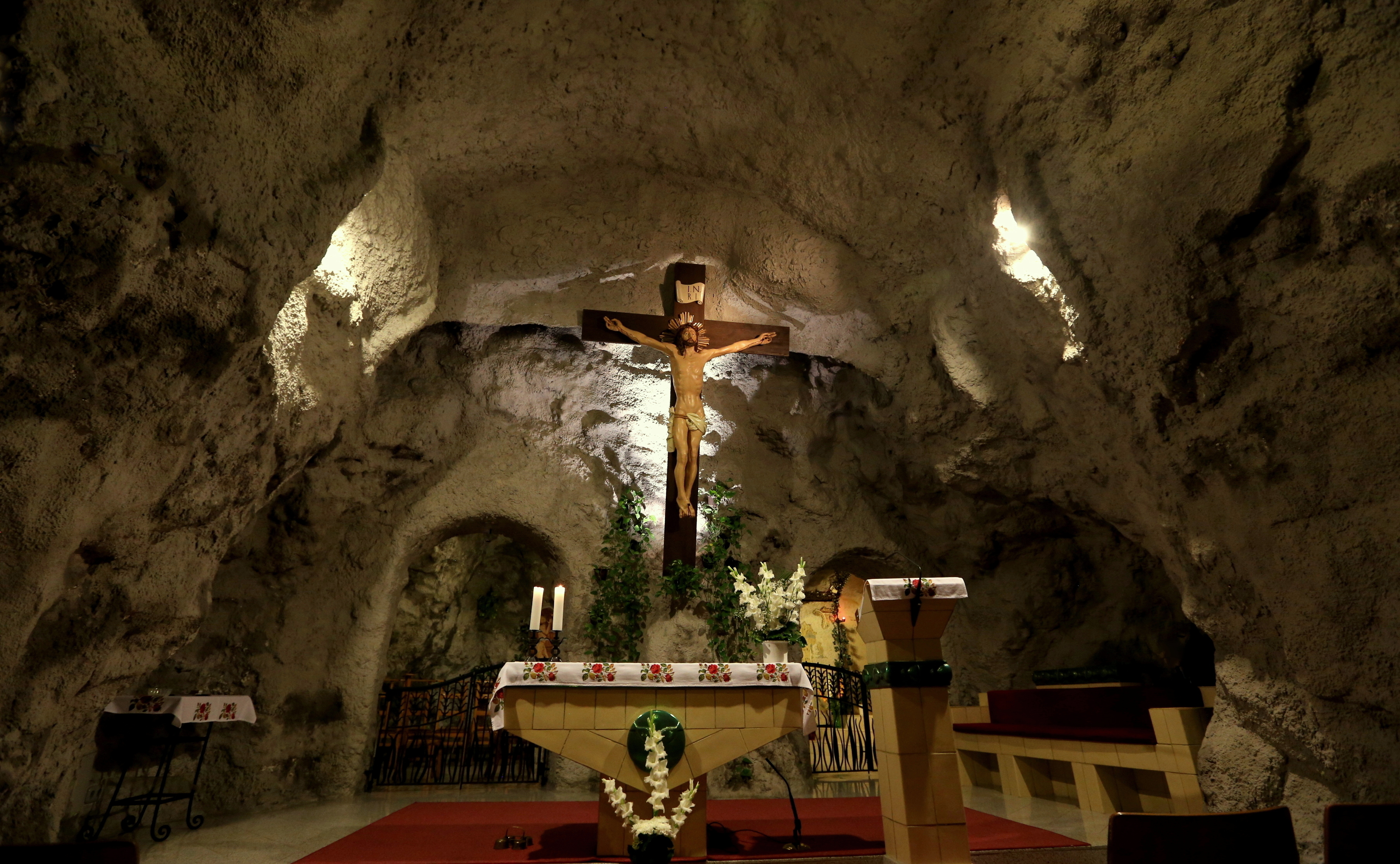
High Altar

The Gellért Hill Cave (Hungarian: Gellérthegyi-barlang) is part of a network of caves within Gellért Hill in Budapest, Hungary. The cave is also referred to as "Saint Ivan's Cave" (Szent Iván-barlang), regarding a hermit who lived there and is believed to have used the natural thermal water of a muddy lake next to the cave to heal the sick. It is likely that this same water fed the pools of the old Sáros fürdő ("Muddy Baths"), now called Gellért Baths.

== Background ==
In the 19th century the cave was inhabited by a poor family who built a small house of sun dried bricks in the great opening. The mouth of the cave was closed off with a planking and it was used as a peasant courtyard. This situation was recorded on a painting by Mihály Mayr (made sometime in the 1860s) and a photograph by György Klösz in 1877.

The first modern entrance for the caves was constructed in the 1920s by a group of Pauline monks who have been inspired by similar rock constructions during a pilgrimage in Lourdes, France. Kálmán Lux, professor at the Technical University, Budapest was the architect in charge. After its consecration in 1926, it served as a chapel (Sziklatemplom English: Cave Church) and monastery until 1951. During this time, it also served as a field hospital for the army of Nazi Germany during World War II.

In 1945, the Soviet Red Army captured Budapest. For six years, the cave continued its religious functions, but in 1951, the State Protection Authority raided the chapel as part of increasing action against the Catholic Church. As a result of the raid, the cave was sealed, the monastery's superior, Ferenc Vezér, was condemned to death, and the remaining brothers were imprisoned for upwards of ten years.

As the Iron Curtain disintegrated, the chapel reopened on 27 August 1989 with the destruction of the thick concrete wall that had sealed the cave. By 1992, the chapel had been restored and the Pauline Order had returned to the cave. Today, the monks continue to perform religious functions within, though the cave is also a common tourist attraction. The church is complemented by a mysterious monastery carved into the rock and decorated with striking neo-gothic turrets. The walls of the cave are formed of natural rock. The church features many rooms, worthy of attention is the one in which all the ornaments have been carved in hardwood by a faithful follower of the Pauline Order. The terrace in front of the entrance is proudly guarded by the statue of Saint Stephen standing beside his horse.
