= Geraltov =

Village and municipality in Prešov District in Slovakia

- Municipality
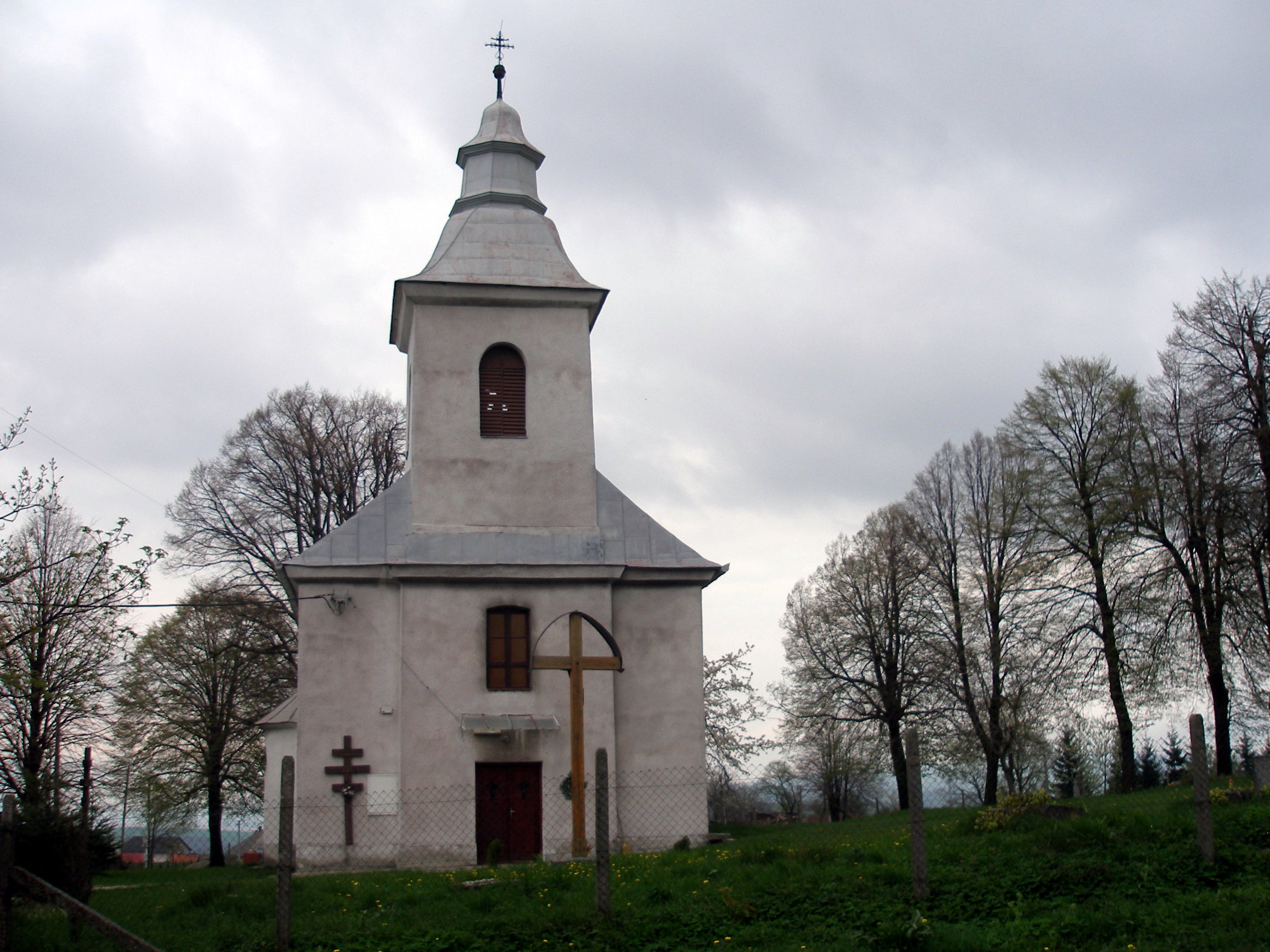

- Flag Coat of arms

- Location of Geraltov in the Prešov Region Location of Geraltov in Slovakia
- Coordinates: 49.13°N 21.27°E
- Country: Slovakia
- Region: Prešov Region
- District: Prešov District
- First mentioned: 1339

Area
  - Total: 10.69 km^{2} (4.13 sq mi)
- Elevation: 518 m (1,699 ft)

Population (2025)
  - Total: 110
- Time zone: UTC+1 (CET)
  - Summer (DST): UTC+2 (CEST)
- Postal code: 826 7
- Area code: +421 51
- Vehicle registration plate (until 2022): PO
- Website: geraltov.sk

Geraltov (Rusyn: Ґералтів, Hungarian: Gellért) is a village and municipality in Prešov District in the Prešov Region of eastern Slovakia.

== History ==
In historical records the village was first mentioned in 1339.

== Geography ==
The municipality lies at an altitude of 518 metres (1,699 ft) and covers an area of 10.69 km^{2} (4.13 sq mi) (2025).

== Population ==
Population statistic (10 years)
Year	1995	2005	2015	2025
Count	152	122	141	110
Difference		−19.73%	+15.57%	−21.98%

Population statistic
Year	2024	2025
Count	110	110
Difference		−1.42%

It has a population of 110 people (31 December 2025).

== Genealogical resources ==
The records for genealogical research are available at the state archive "Statny Archiv in Presov, Slovakia"

- Roman Catholic church records (births/marriages/deaths):1717-1896 (parish B)
- Greek Catholic church records (births/marriages/deaths): 1800–1895 (parish A)

== See also ==
- List of municipalities and towns in Slovakia
