= Jay Gellert =

American businessman

Jay Gellert (born 1954) is the former CEO and president of Health Net, Inc. He joined Health Net in 1996 as president and chief operating officer of one of Health Net's predecessor companies, Health Systems International, Inc. Under his control, Health Net was forced to pay several million dollars in fines, penalties and reimbursements for fraudulent practices, including the denial of care to those covered by Health Net.

== Professional history ==
Jay Gellert was born and raised in New York City, New York. He attended Stanford University and holds a Bachelor of Arts degree. In 1985 he became the senior vice president and chief operating officer of California Healthcare System. He left that company in 1988 to work as president and CEO of Bay Pacific Health Corporation until 1991. In 1996, he became president and COO of Health Systems International, one of Health Net's predecessor companies. He has served as Health Net's president and CEO since August 1998.
