= Gelert's Farm Works =

Railway operating centre in Porthmadog, Wales

Coordinates: 52.93115°N 4.12861°W

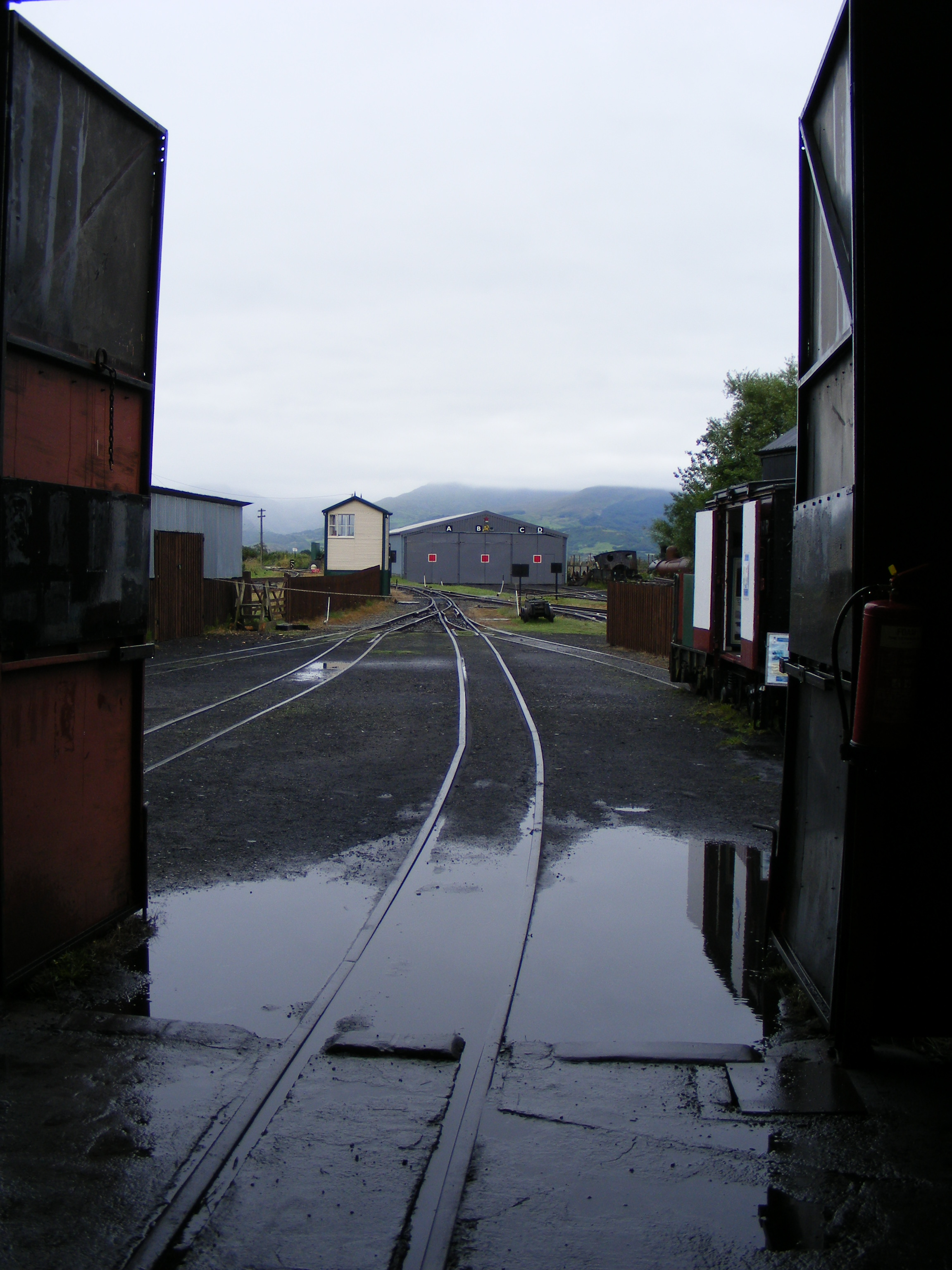
Gelert's Farm Works from the entrance to the big shed. The RED shed can be seen in the middle distance

Gelert's Farm Works is the operating centre for the Welsh Highland Heritage Railway (WHHR). It is located in Porthmadog, Wales, and was, as the name suggests, a working farm.

== History ==
After the WHHR purchased Beddgelert Siding in 1973 from British Rail the ramshackle collection of farm buildings now known as Gelert's Farm came up for sale. The farm, which is situated between Beddgelert Siding and the Cambrian line, was purchased to become the operating centre for the rebuilt Welsh Highland Railway (WHR). After possession of the land was obtained in late 1975 track was laid into the site. Over the next couple of years five sidings were laid into the yard and another back towards Pen-y-Mount. The old hay barn was converted into a locomotive shed and a large pole barn became the Carriage Shed. The stone buildings were converted to workshops and a machine shop.

In 1984 the area between the Carriage Shed and the WHHR main line was cleared and the 'Big Shed', 100 by 40 feet (30 by 12 m), was constructed. The now vacant Carriage Shed was taken over by the Civil Engineer's Department and renamed the Civvies Shed. The yard was remodelled giving four roads (Nos. 1–4) in the Big Shed, two roads into the Civvies Shed (Nos. 5&6), one road into the Loco Shed (No. 7) and a siding (No. 8) alongside the Loco Shed.

The next major development was the construction of the RED (an acronym for Railway Extension Department) Shed north of the main yard alongside Farm Junction. This was in an area of the site known as the Old Man's Area. Between 1990 and 1993 a new shed, 60 by 30 feet (18.3 by 9.1 m), was constructed and fitted out by the Railway Extension Department. Three Sidings (designated A-C) were laid into the new RED Shed (painted grey) and another siding (designated D) was laid alongside the RED Shed. Access was gained from a half lead on No. 8 road alongside the Loco Shed. During this period the shunting neck parallel to the main line was extended to the site of the old trans-shipment wharf where two sidings were laid.

By 2003 the WHHR had decided that its future lay in becoming the heritage centre for the entire WHR. It was realised that more covered accommodation, workshop space and sidings would be needed over the next ten years. The Civvies Shed had ceased to be used as a workshop, had become a depository for junk and was thought to be in imminent danger of collapse. In August 2003 a new siding (No. 9) was laid into the cleared eastern bay of the shed for use as a Wagon repair shop. Over the next six months the roof was repaired and most of the floor concreted. The renamed Carriage & Wagon Workshop (C&W Shop) is now back in use, building and repairing both carriages and wagons.

During June 2005 the north west corner of the C&W Shop was dismantled. One month later during the WHHR's annual Civil's Week the trackwork in front of the Shed was rearranged with two half leads, this resulting in a new siding between the Big Shed and the C&W Shop. The new siding was numbered 5. The two sidings into the C&W Shop were renumbered 6&7. The Loco Shed road was renumbered 8 and the old No. 8 became No. 10. Over the Christmas holiday No. 5 road was extended between the two sheds and alongside the exhibition area. Eventually a new shed (3.4.5 Shed) will cover the exhibition area with Nos. 3&4 roads extended through the back of the Big Shed alongside No. 5 road. No. 6 road was severed alongside the Loco Stores and then slewed 8 ft towards the Joiners Shop and extended 80 ft towards the Cambrian Line. A concrete pad 45 by 10 feet (13.7 by 3.0 m) was laid at the end of the siding for the new Diesel Shed.
