= Gellért Hill =

Hill in Budapest, Hungary

Gellért Hill (J Loop)
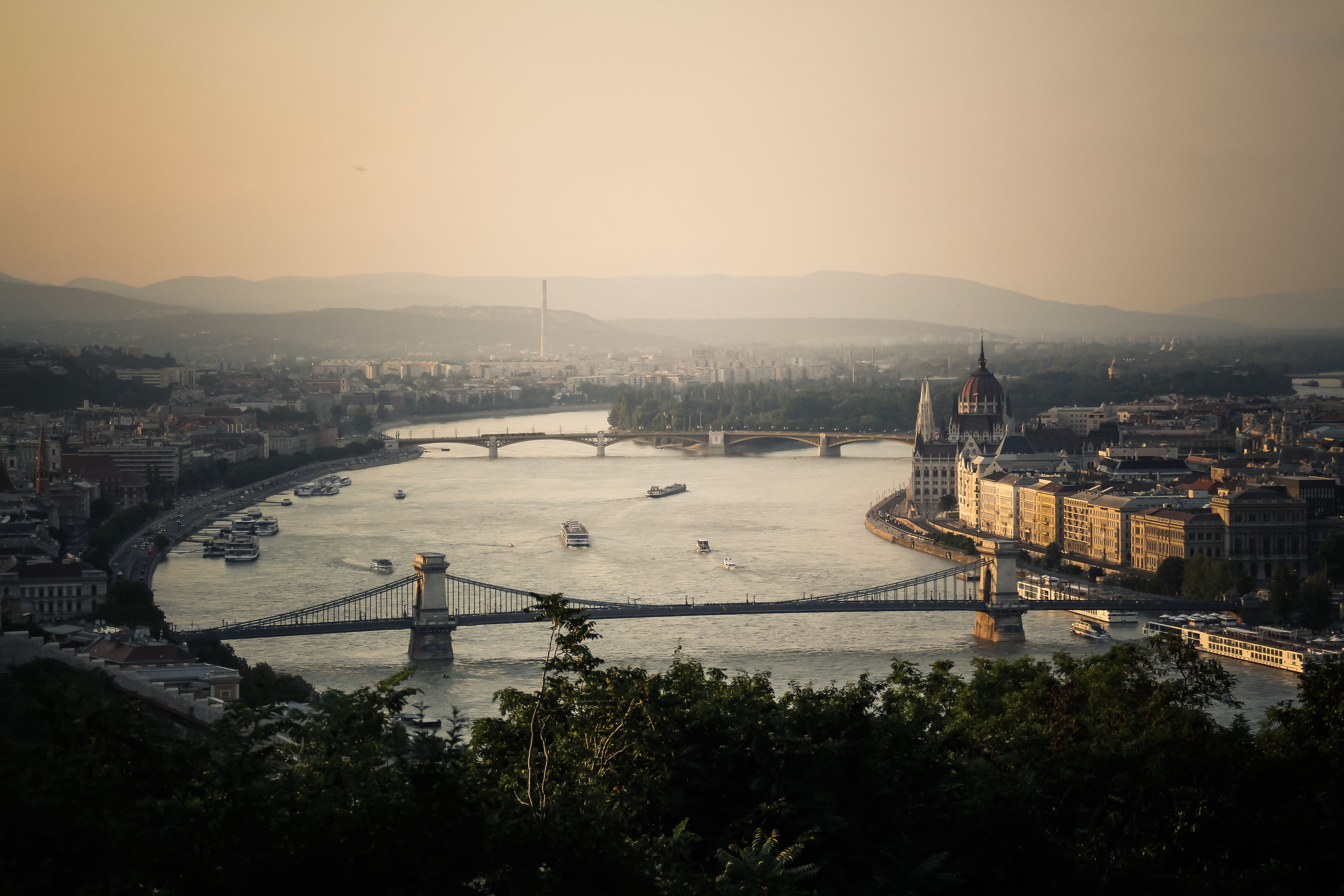
- Skyline of Budapest from Gellért Hill. Danube River which separates Buda and Pest.

Highest point
- Elevation: 771 ft (235 m)
- Coordinates: 47°29′11″N 19°02′45″E

Geography
- Location: Budapest, Hungary

Climbing
- Easiest route: Hike

Gellért Hill (Hungarian: Gellért-hegy; German: Kelenberg, Osterberg or Blocksberg; Latin: Mons Sancti Gerhardi Turkish: Gürz İlyas Bayırı) is a 235 m (771 ft) high hill overlooking the Danube in Budapest, Hungary. It is located in the 1st and the 11th districts. The hill was named after Saint Gerard who was thrown to death from the hill. The famous Hotel Gellért and the Gellért Baths can be found in Gellért Square at the foot of the hill, next to Liberty Bridge. The Gellért Hill Cave is also located on the hill, facing the hotel and the Danube.

At the top of the hill, about 140 metres (460 feet) above the river, the Citadella (English: citadel) can be found with a nice panoramic view of the city.

== Origin of the name ==
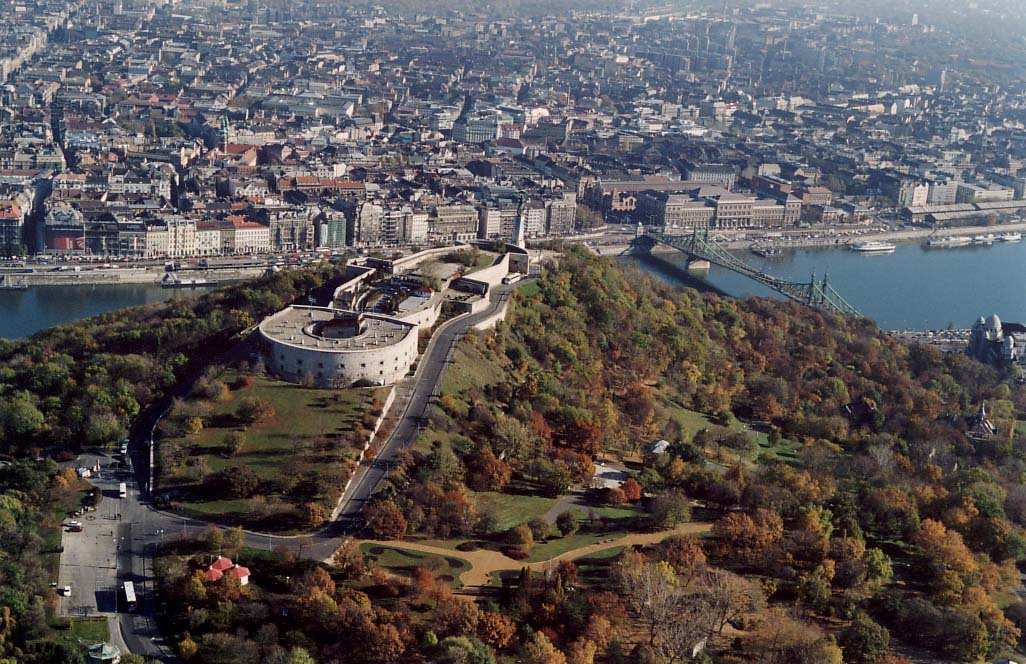
The Citadella.

The first recorded names of the hill in the Middle Ages were Kelen-hegy, Pesti-hegy (English: Pest Hill) and Blocksberg. Since the 15th century, it has been called Szent Gellért hegye (lit. the hill of St. Gerard), in reference to the legend of the death of St. Gerard (Hungarian: Szent Gellért), Bishop of Csanád. The bishop was assassinated by the pagans during the great pagan rebellion in 1046. He was allegedly put in a barrel and rolled down from the top of the hill.

The former name, Pesti-hegy (Latin: Mons Pestiensis) referred to the large cave (now Gellért Hill Cave) in the hillside. The word is probably of Slavic origin and means oven or cave.

The Ottoman Turks called the hill Gürz Elyas bayiri. Gürz Elyas was a holy man from the Bektashi order whose shrine and grave on top of the hill was a place of pilgrimage in the 17th century.

== Geology ==
The hill belongs to the Buda Hills but, in a narrow sense, it connects to the southern Buda range consisting also Sashegy. These hills are based on main dolomite from the Late Triassic epoch, although the hills themselves arose later in the Pleistocene along a tectonic breakline. This explains also the origin of the hot springs all around the area. The caves are the result of the breaklines and the springs. The most significant among them is the Gellért Hill Cave with the Sziklatemplom (English: Cave Church).

== History ==
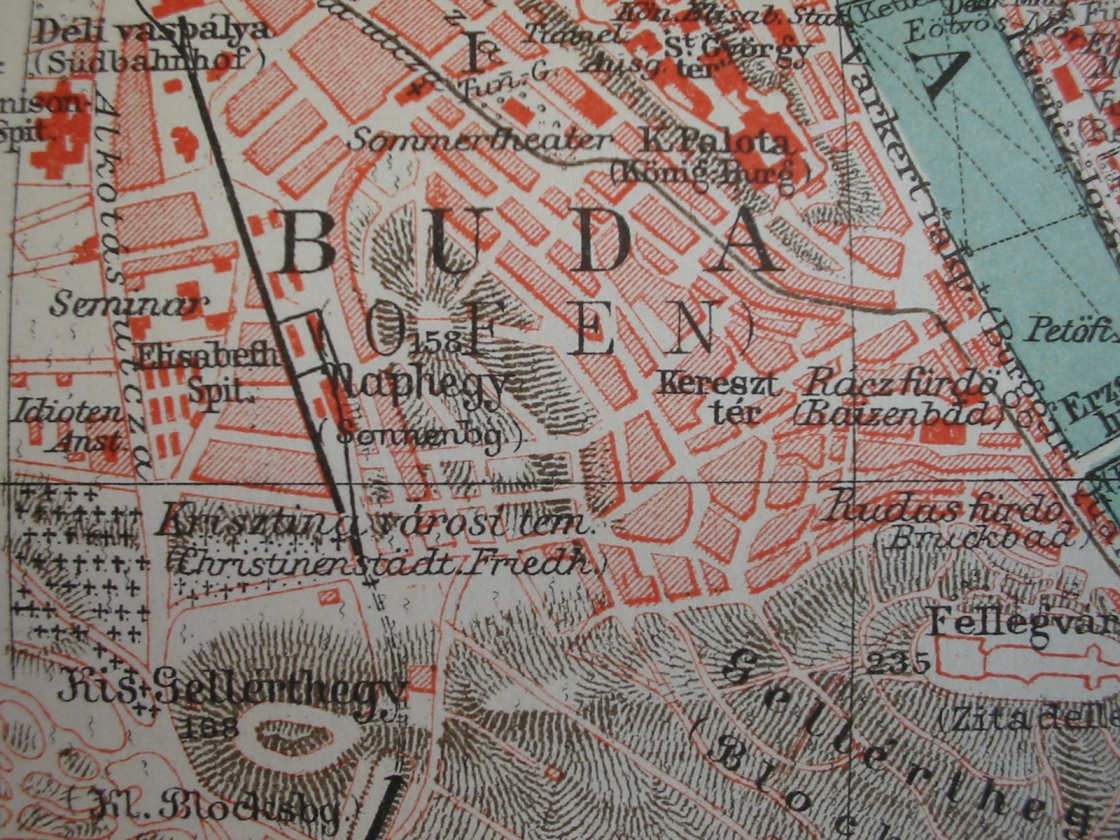
Naphegy and Tabán in Budapest 1905 Meyers Lexikon

After the assassination of St. Gerard, the hill was not populated. The dense forest and rocks gave way to legends of witches holding their ceremonies on the hill.

From the 18th century the hillsides were covered with vineyards. The Tabán district at the foot of the hill was an important centre of winemaking in Buda. According to the 1789 land register vineyards covered 128 hectares (316 ac) on the hill (only 7.62 hectares or 18.8 ac were used as pastures).

A small calvary was built on the top of the hill which was rebuilt around 1820. On Easter Mondays a procession climbed the steep road leading to the calvary to celebrate the resurrection of Christ. Many tents and vendors were erected on the nearby meadow. Emmausjárás (En: Emmaus-walk) or tojásbúcsú (En: Egg Feast) was one of the most popular Catholic holidays of the year during the 18th–19th centuries.

The Citadella was built after the 1848–49 Hungarian uprising by the ruling Habsburgs, as it was a prime, strategic site for shelling both Buda and Pest in the event of a future revolt.

Gellért Hill also saw action in the Second World War and the 1956 Hungarian Revolution, when Soviet tanks fired down into the city from the hill. Indeed, battle scars still pockmark some buildings in Budapest. There is a small military museum in the Citadella’s grounds. At the end of the Citadella is the Liberty Statue (Szabadság Szobor in Hungarian), a large monument erected by the Soviet Red Army to commemorate their victory in World War II.

== Today ==
Now an affluent residential area, a number of embassies and ambassadorial residences line the streets that wind up the hill. Since 1987, the area has been a UNESCO World Heritage site as part of "the Banks of the Danube".

A large proportion of the hill consists of parkland. Bats and hedgehogs are commonly observed on summer nights.

In January 2007, a new cave was discovered under Gellért Hill during private construction. The cave is 60 by 18 m (200 by 59 ft) with three rooms. The interior is covered with white crystals composed of gypsum, calcite, and aragonite. The cave was created 300,000–500,000 years ago by a now disappeared thermal spring. The crystal cave was immediately placed under legal protection.

== Gallery ==
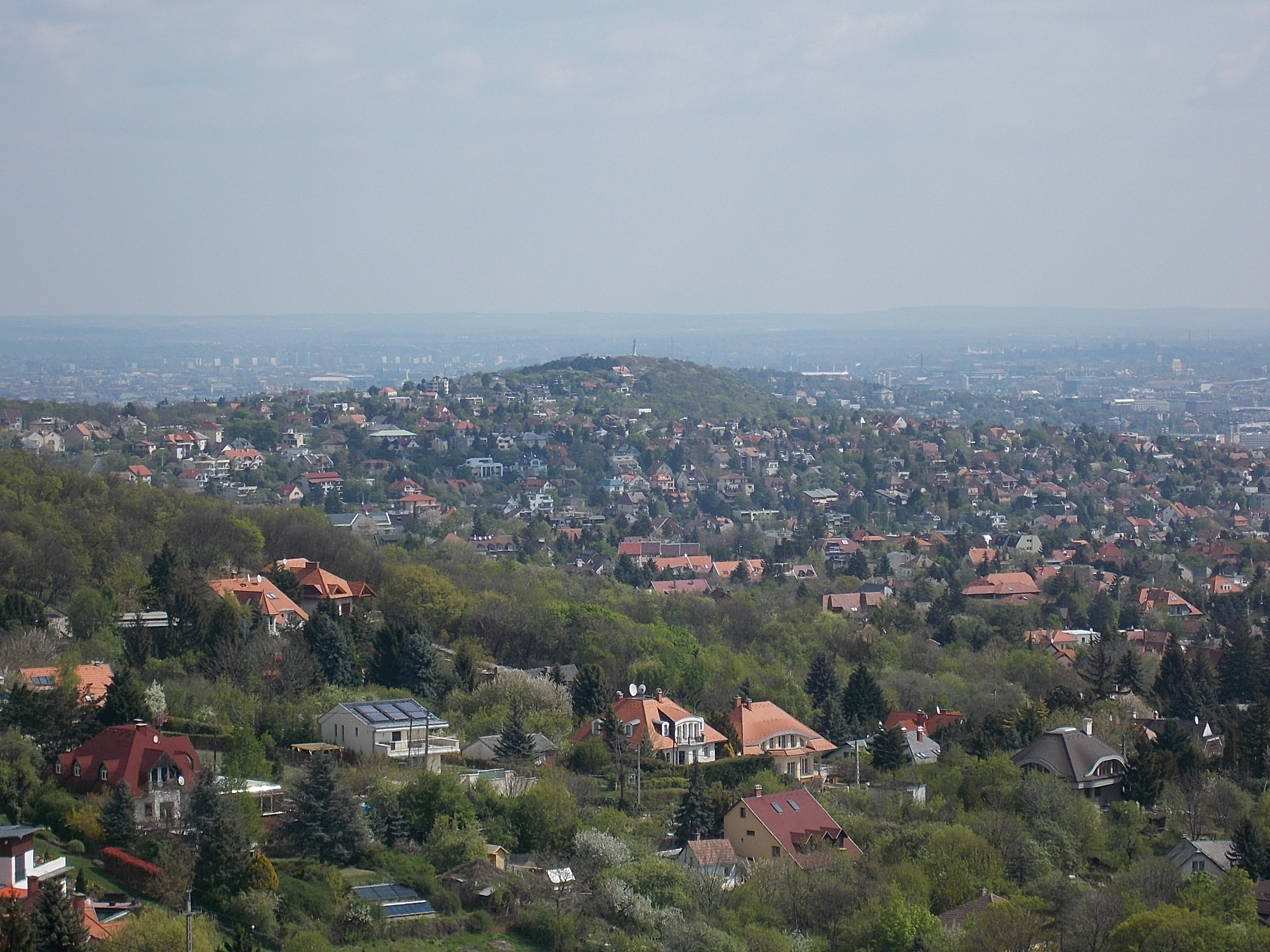
Gellért Hill from Tűzkő Hill

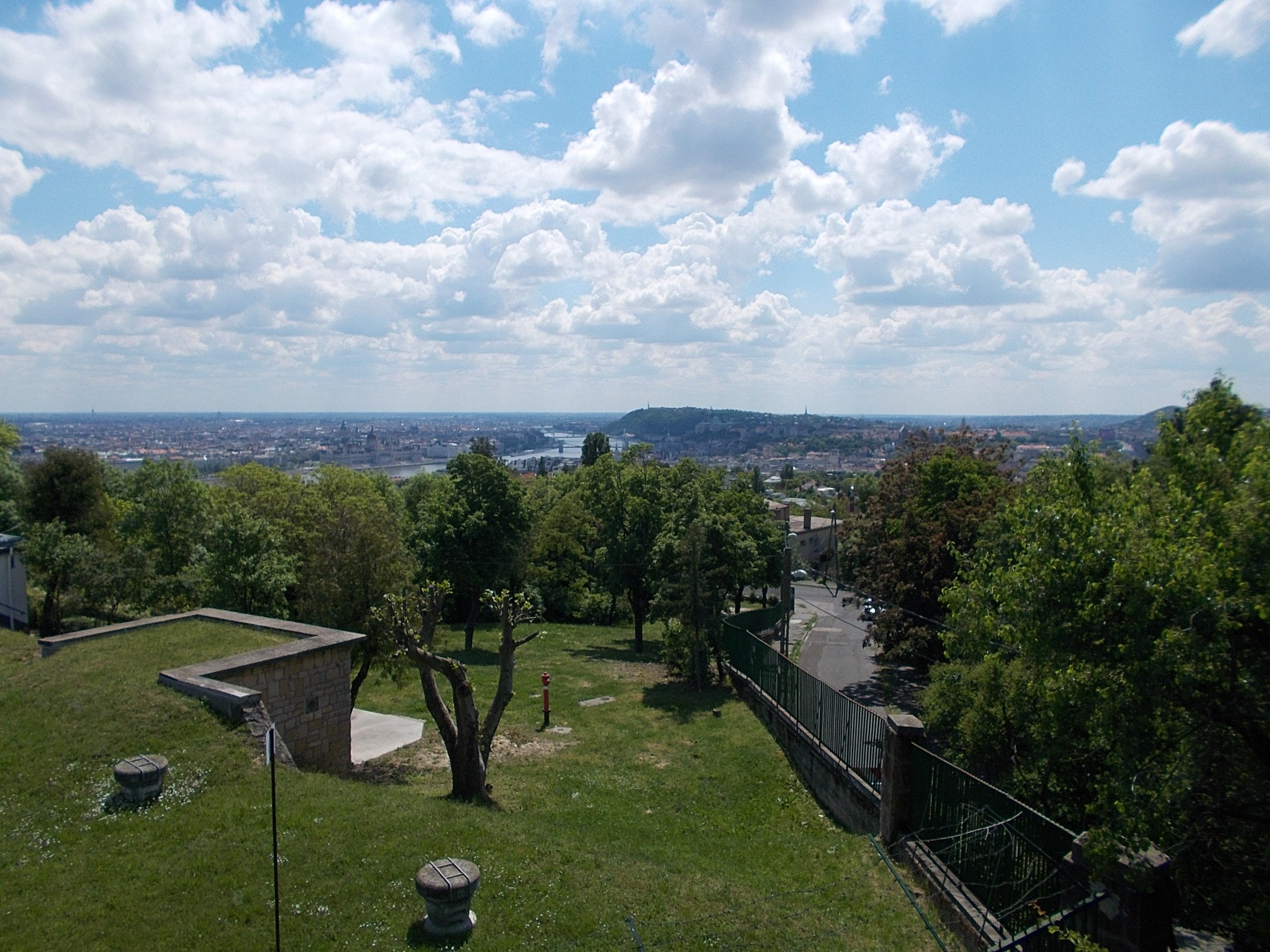
View toward Gellért hill from József-hegy lookout tower

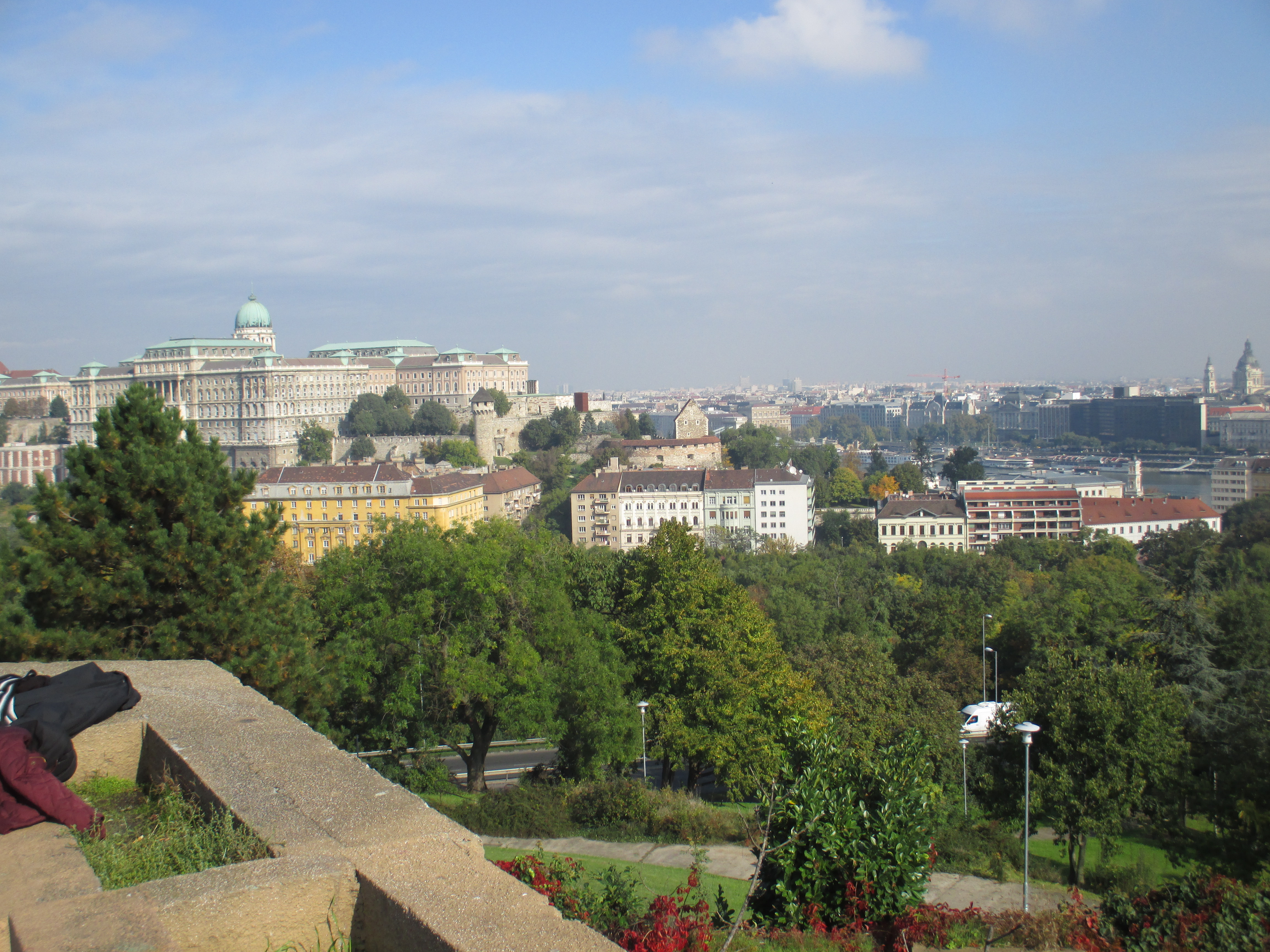
View from the hill I.

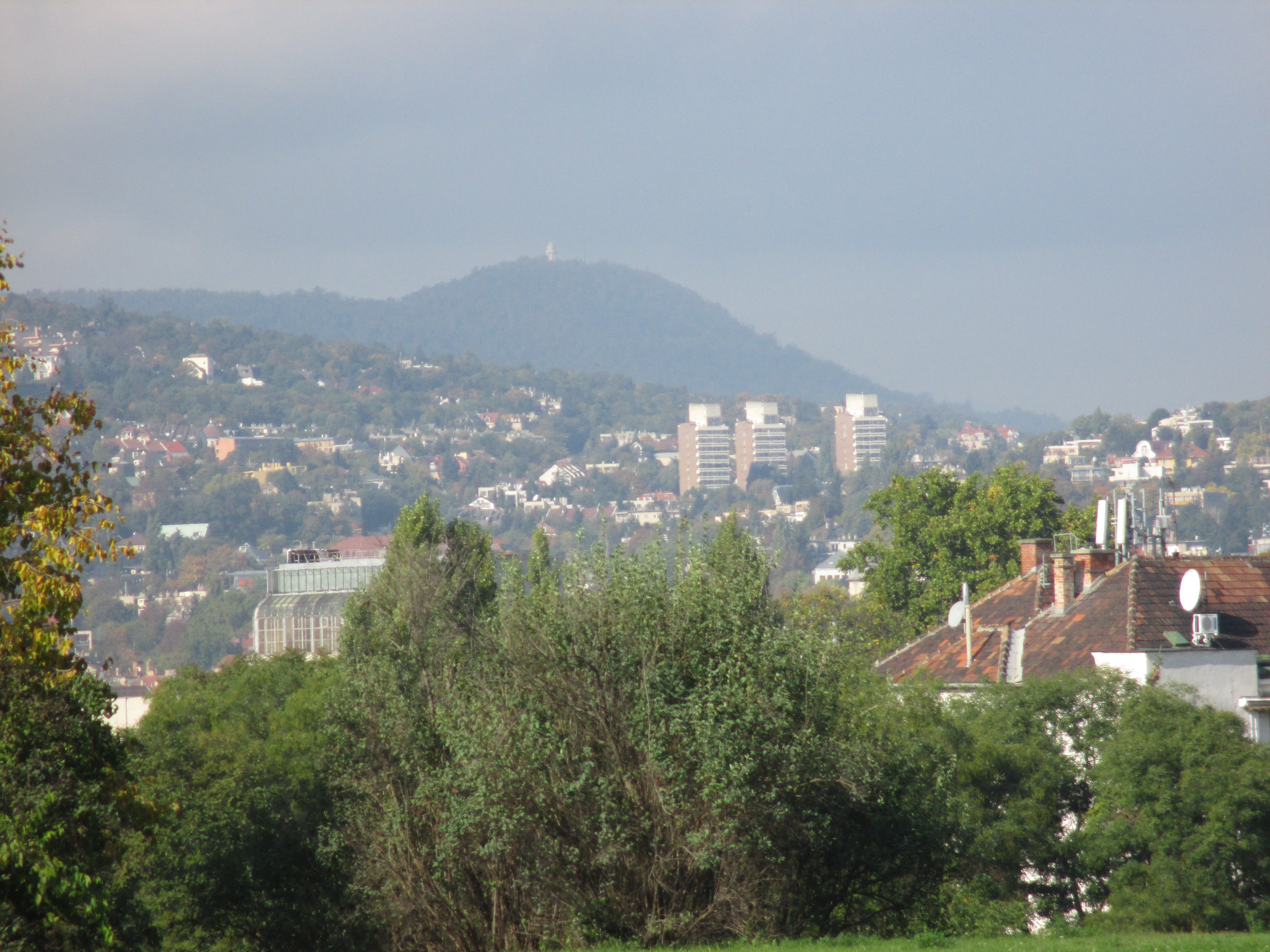
View from the hill II.

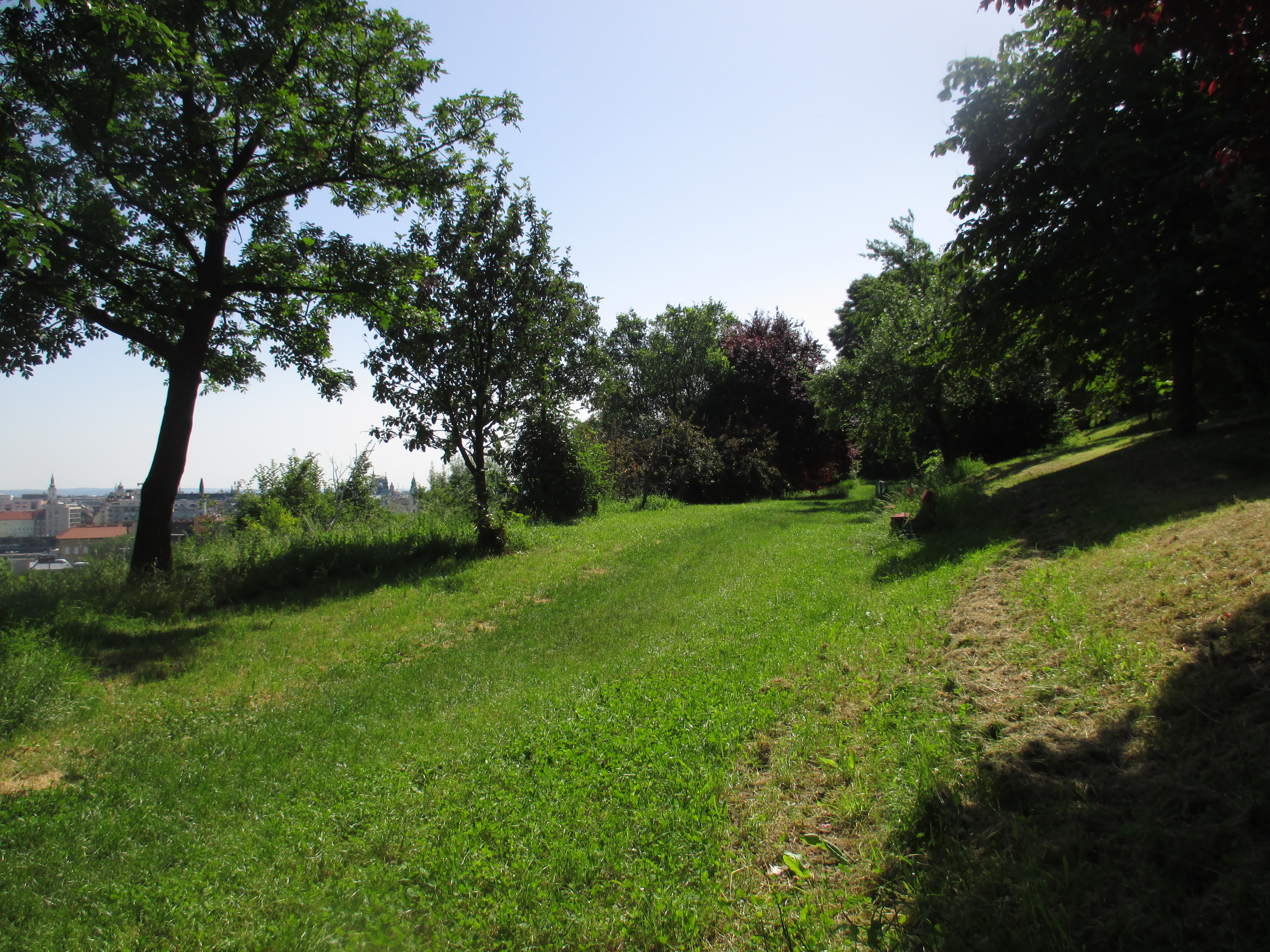
Nature on Gellért Hill

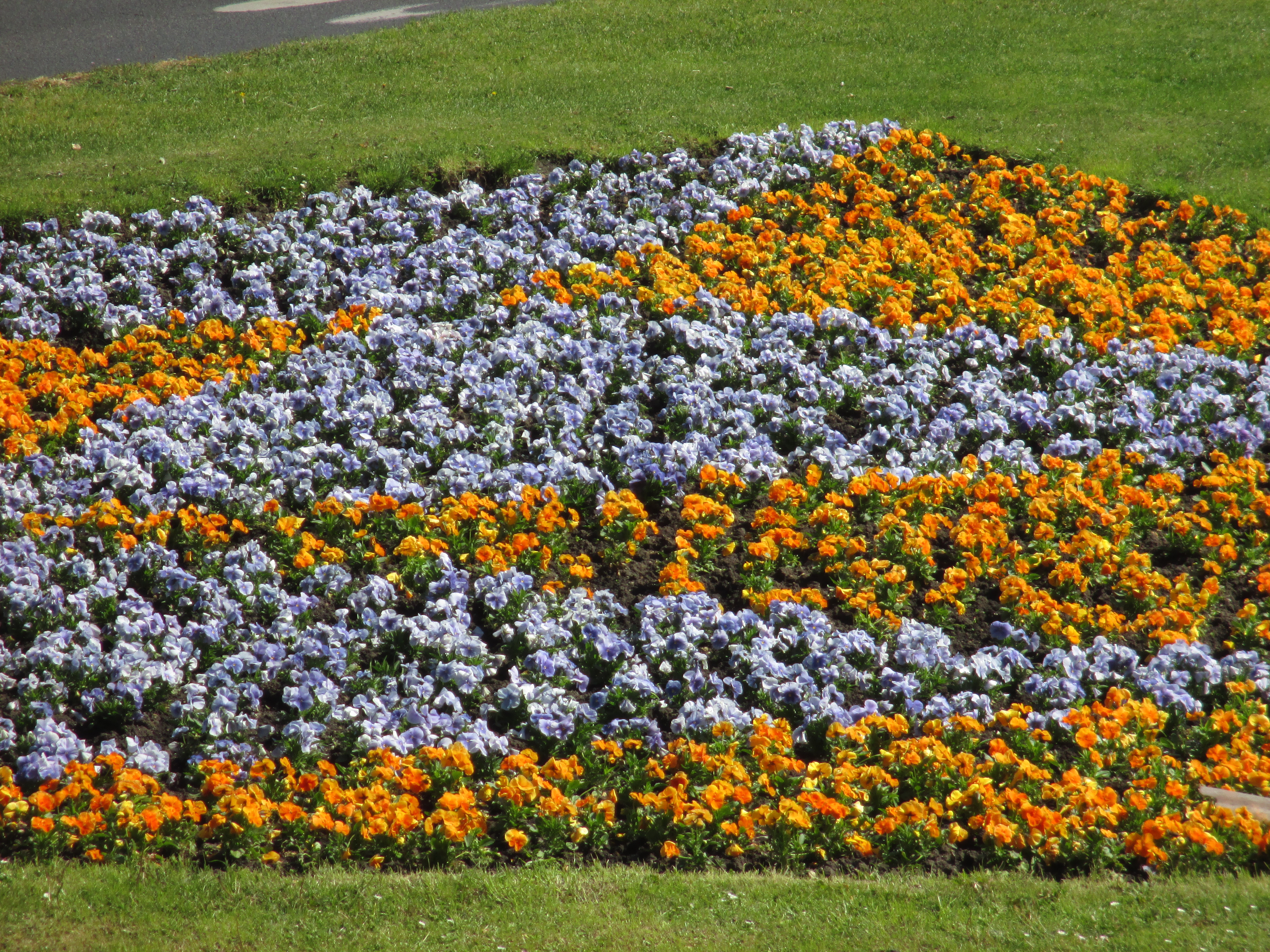
Bloom garden on the top of the hill

== See also ==
- Naphegy
- Tabán
- Gellért Hill Calvary
