= List of tourist attractions in Budapest =

Budapest attractions

This List of tourist attractions in Budapest lists the most important sights of Budapest by district and date of construction.

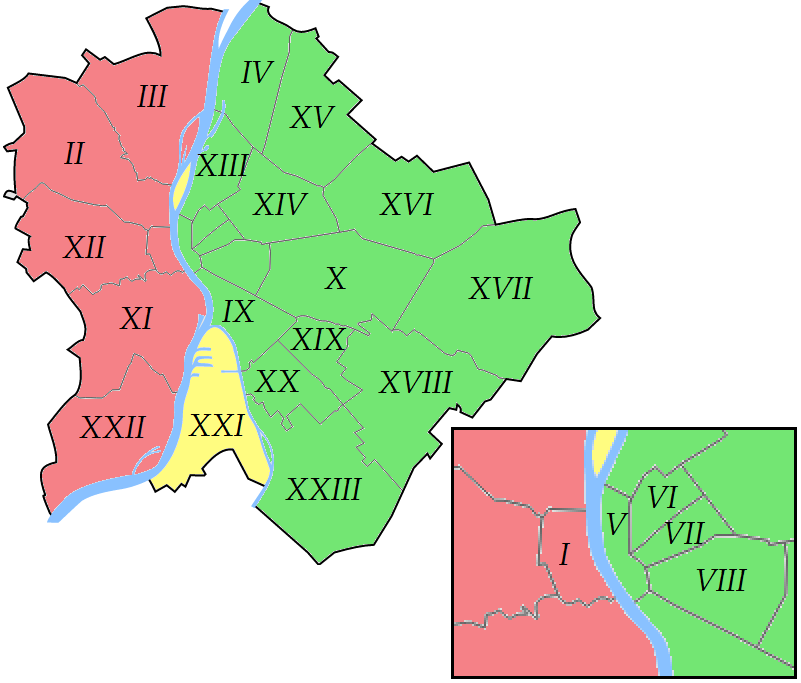

== Sights by list ==
=== Churches, religious buildings ===
- Matthias Church, the oldest church (1015)
- Saint Peter of Alcantara Franciscan Church (ca. 1241)
- Church of Mary Magdalene, ruins of the oldest churches (ca. 13th century)
- Inner City Parish Church in Pest (ca. 14th century)
- Palace Chapel (ca. 15th century)
- Tomb of Gül Baba, northernmost Islamic pilgrimage site in the world (1543–1548)
- Our Lady of the Snows Parish Church (1694)
- University Church (1715–1771)
- St. Catherine of Alexandria Church (1749)
- Church of Stigmatisation of Saint Francis (1757)
- Saint Anne Parish (1761)
- Lutheran Church of Deák Square, the biggest Protestant church (1799–1808)
- Reformed Church of Kálvin Square, the most famous Reformed church (1816–1830)
- St. Stephen's Basilica, the biggest church (1851–1905)
- Dohány Street Synagogue, largest synagogue in Europe (1854–1859)
- Rumbach Street Synagogue (1869–1872)
- Szilágyi Dezső Square Reformed Church (1894–1896)
- Lutheran Church of Budavár, the oldest Lutheran church of Buda (1895)
- St Elizabeth of the House of Arpad Parish Church (1895–1901)
- Gellért Hill Cave, national chancel (1931)
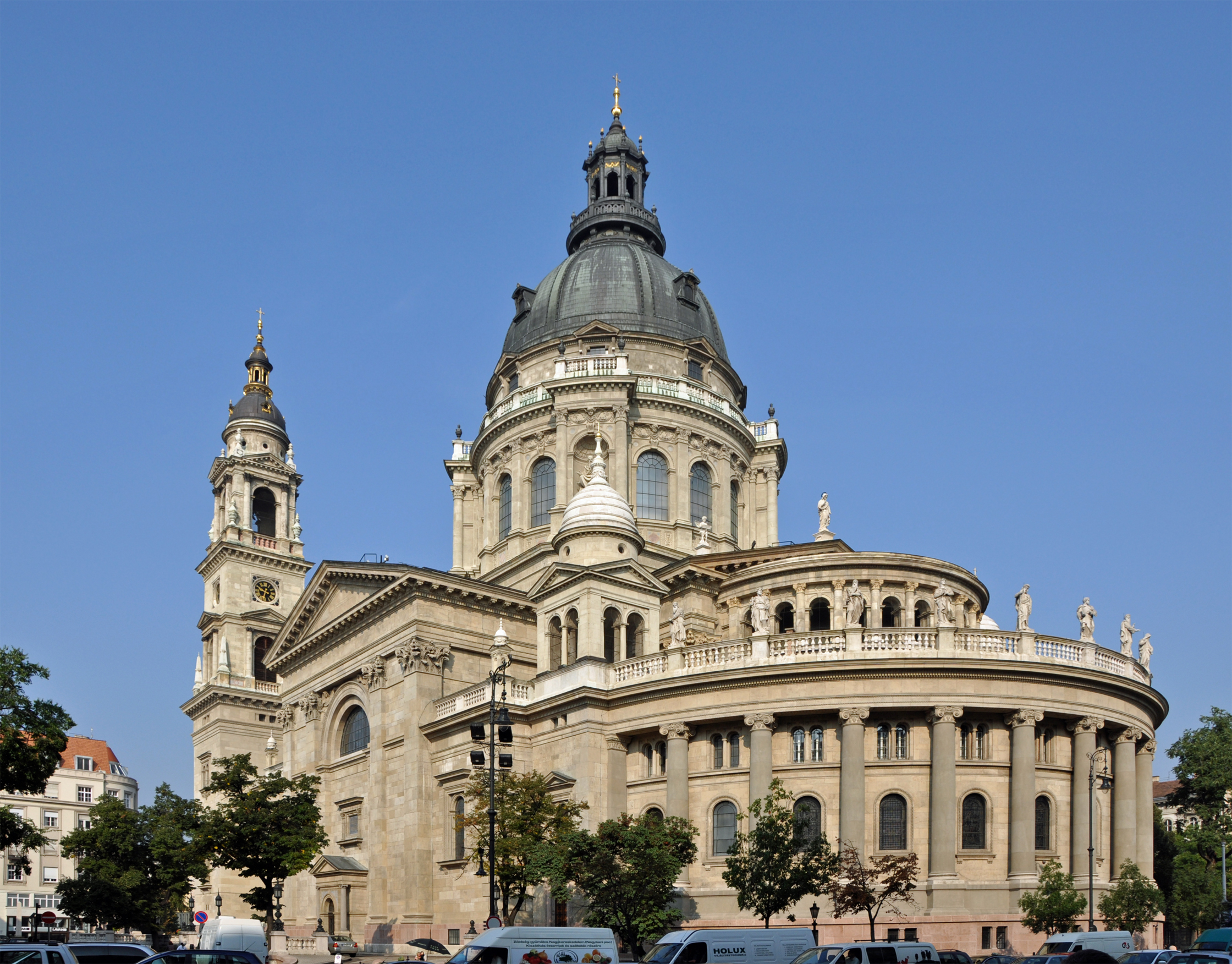
St. Stephen's Basilica

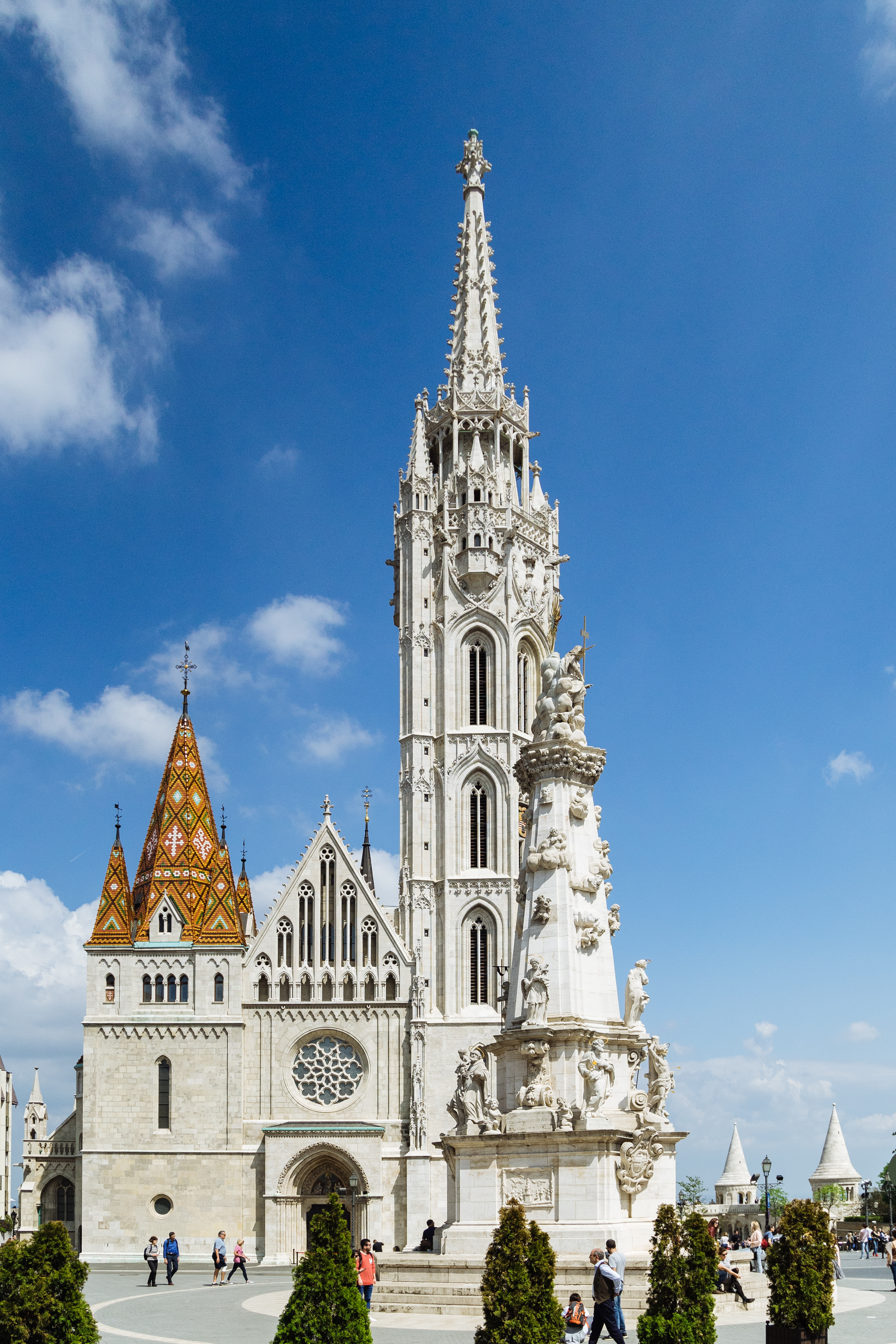
Matthias Church

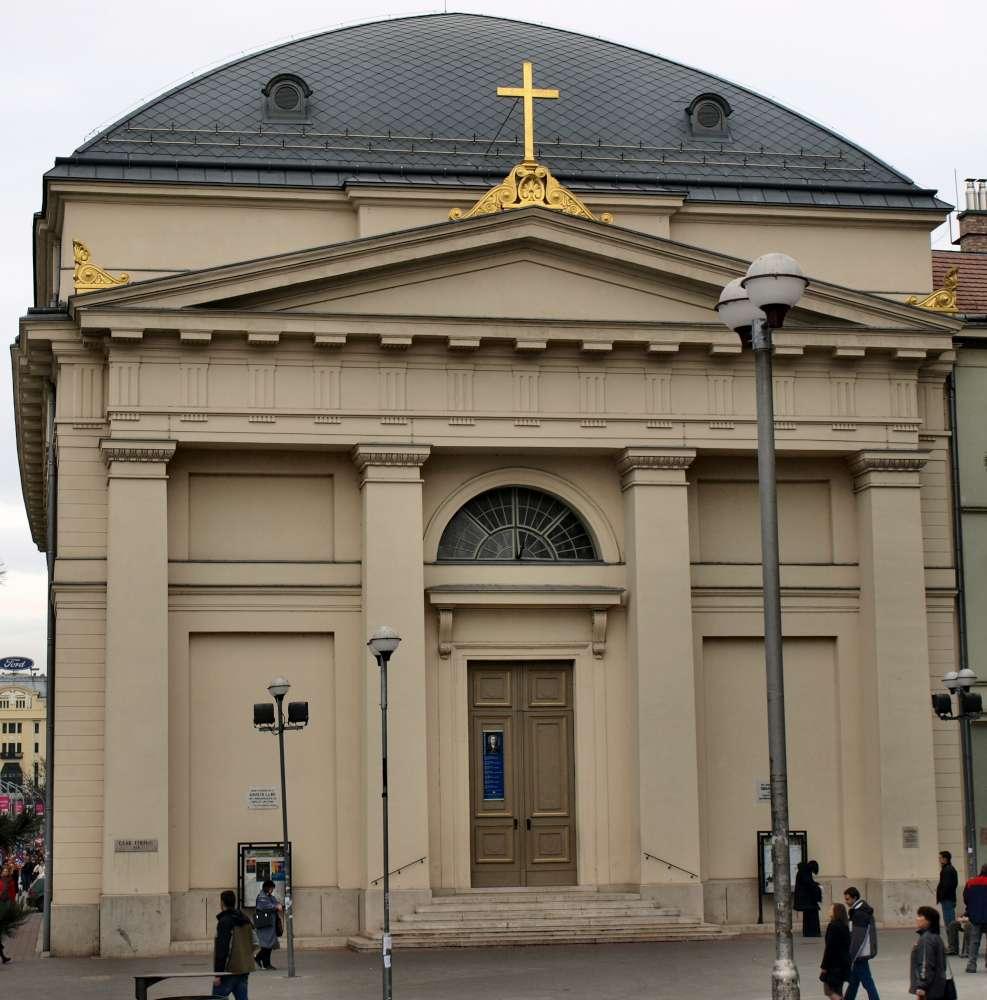
Deák Square Church

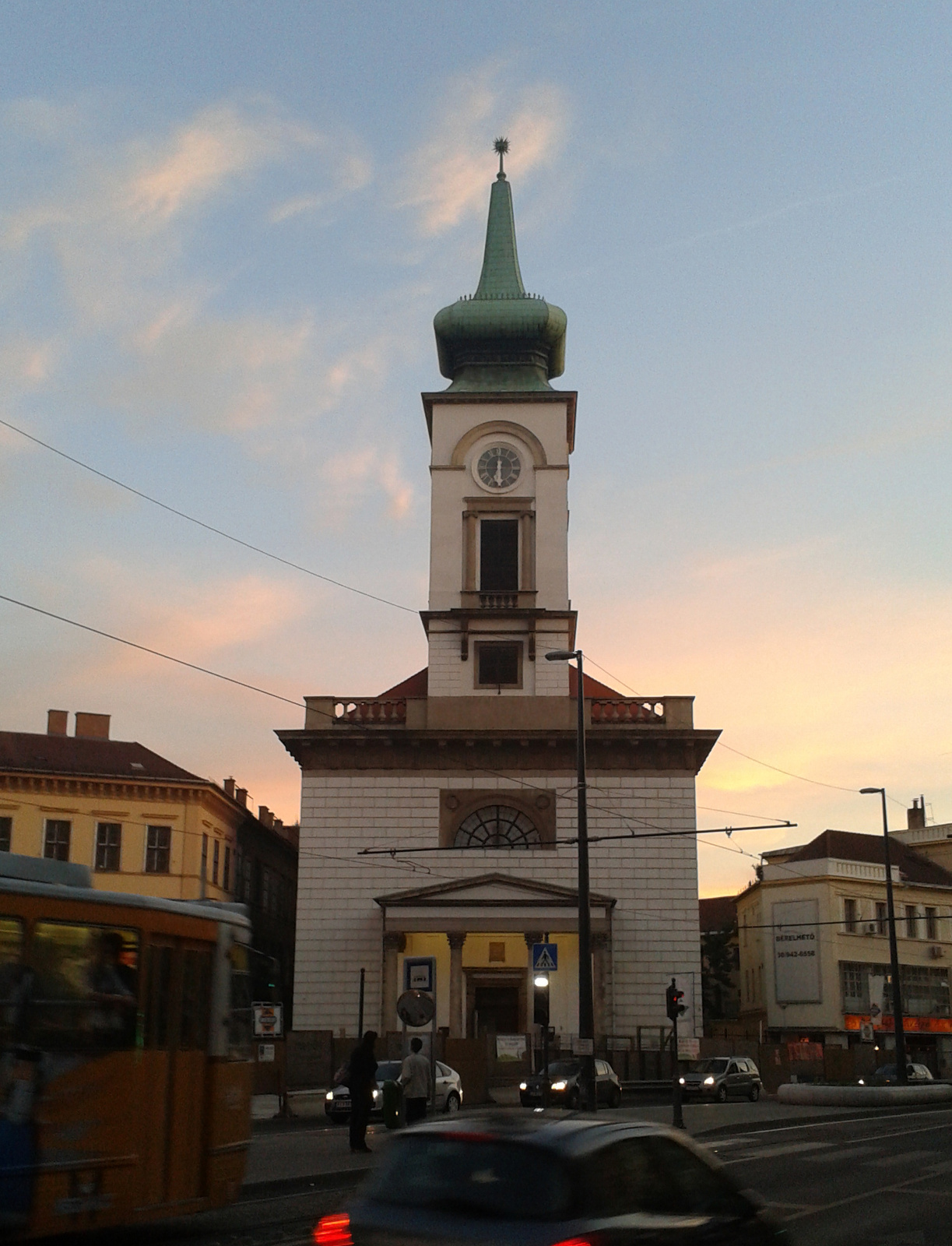
Kálvin Square Church

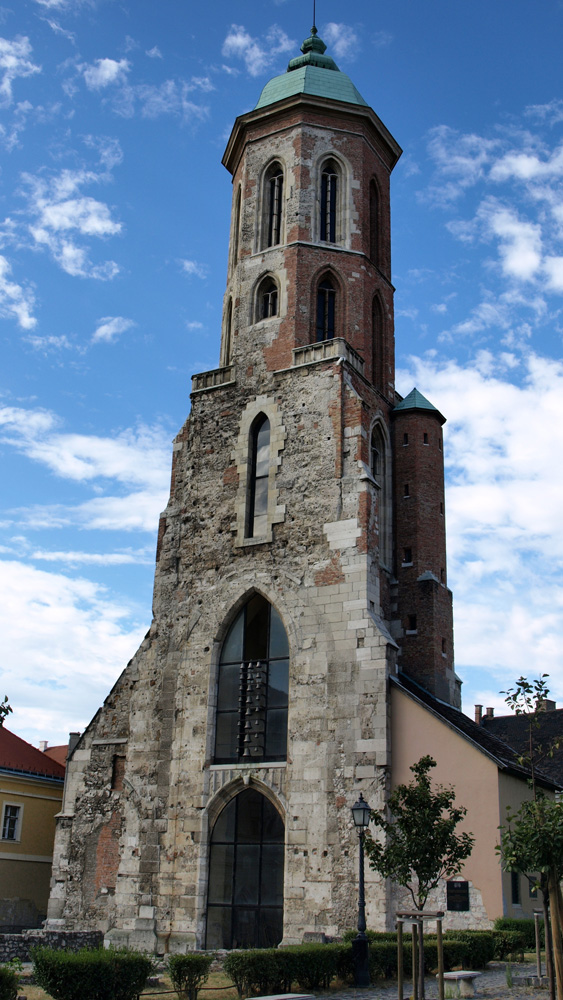
Church of Mary Magdalene

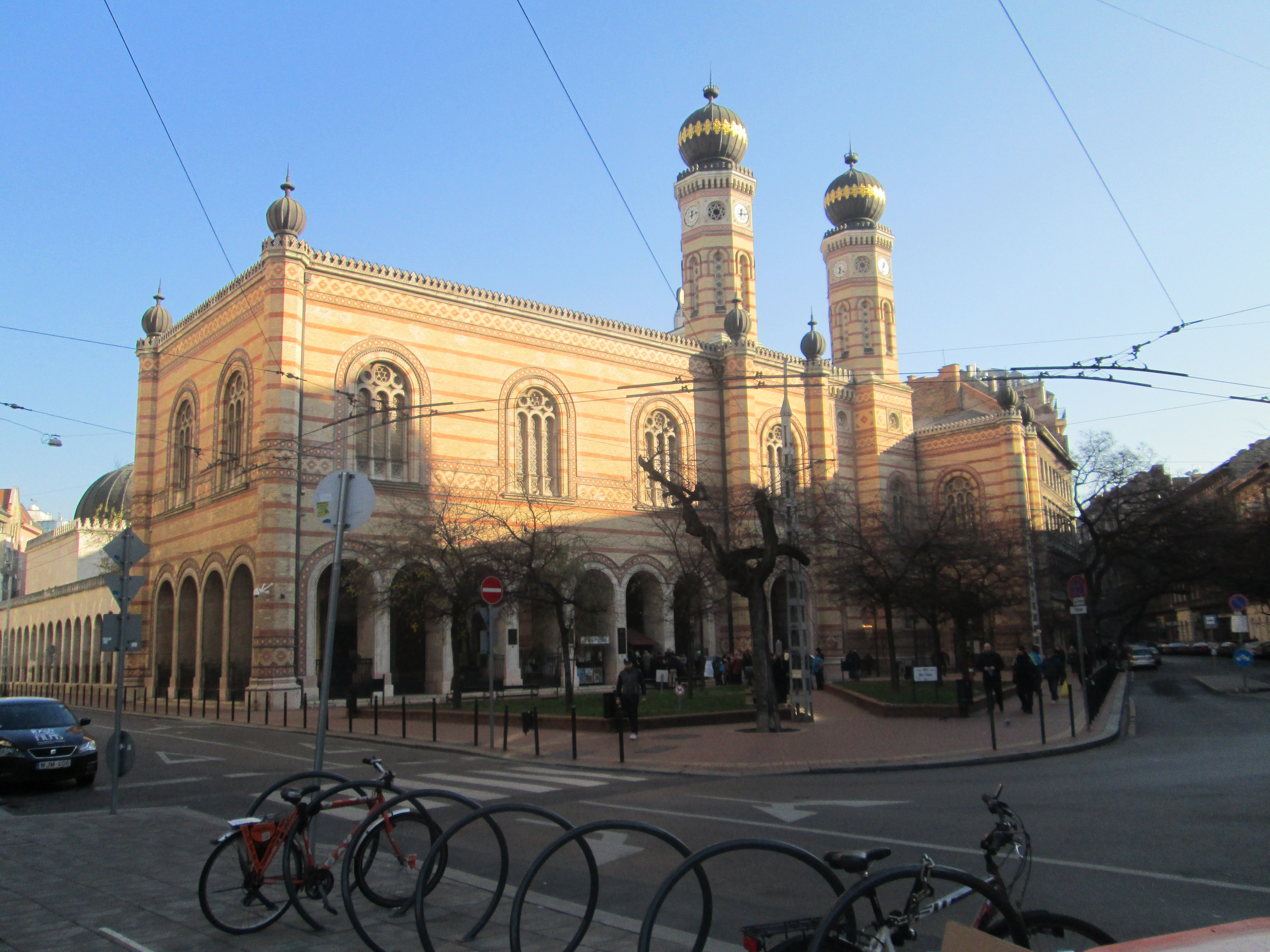
Dohány Street Synagogue

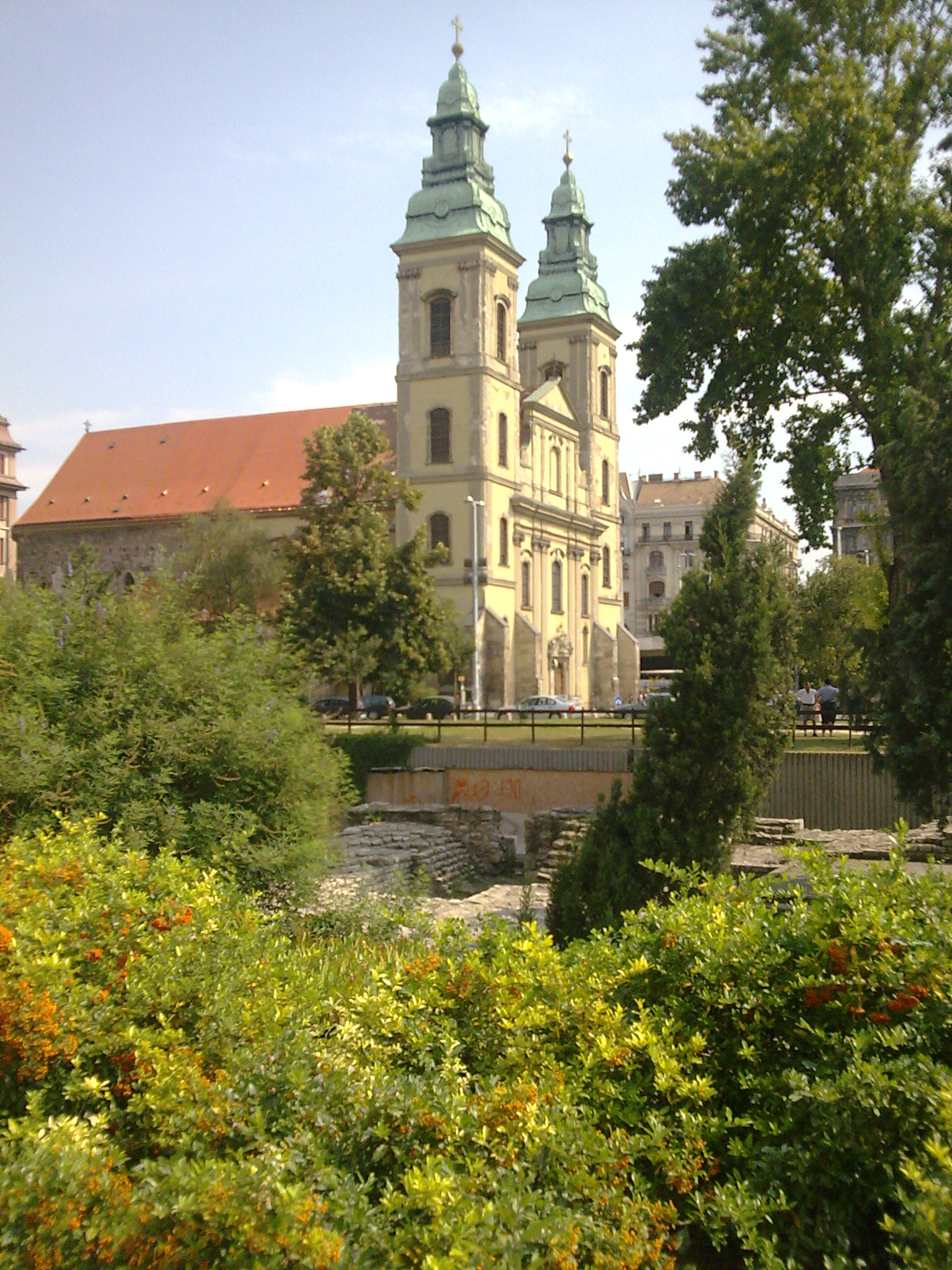
Inner City Parish Church

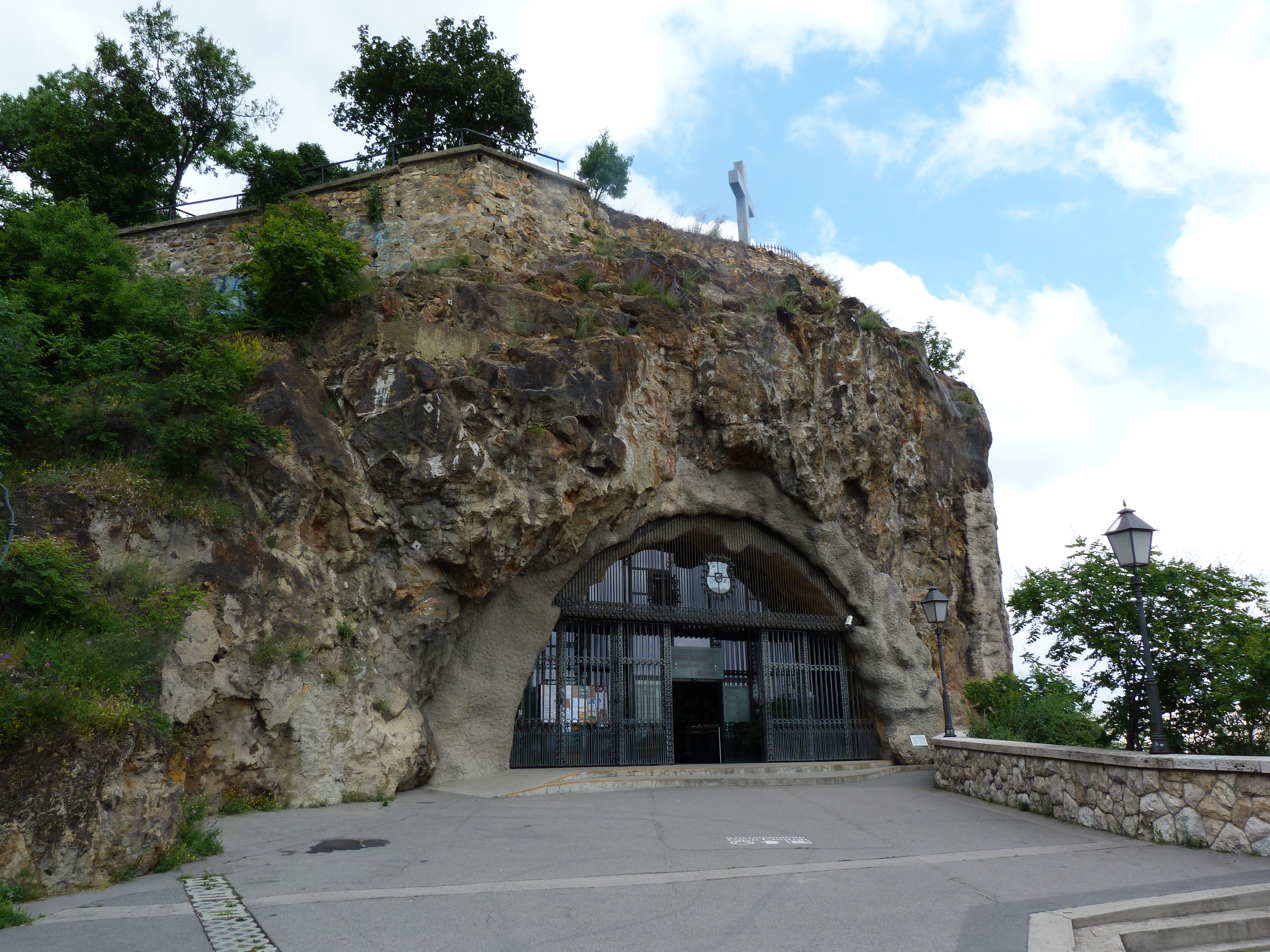
Gellért Cave Church

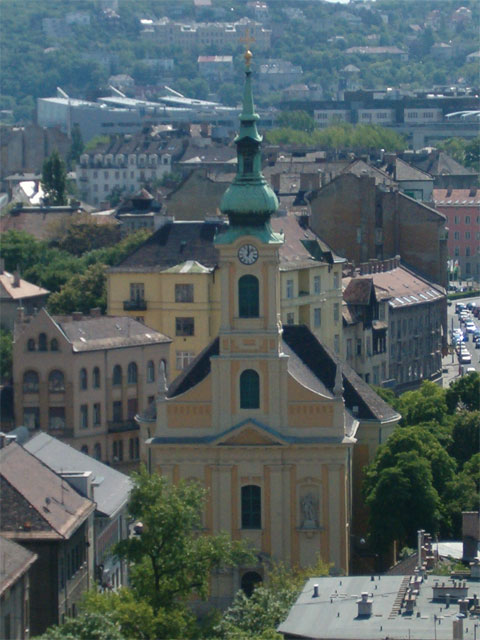
St Elizabeth Parish Church

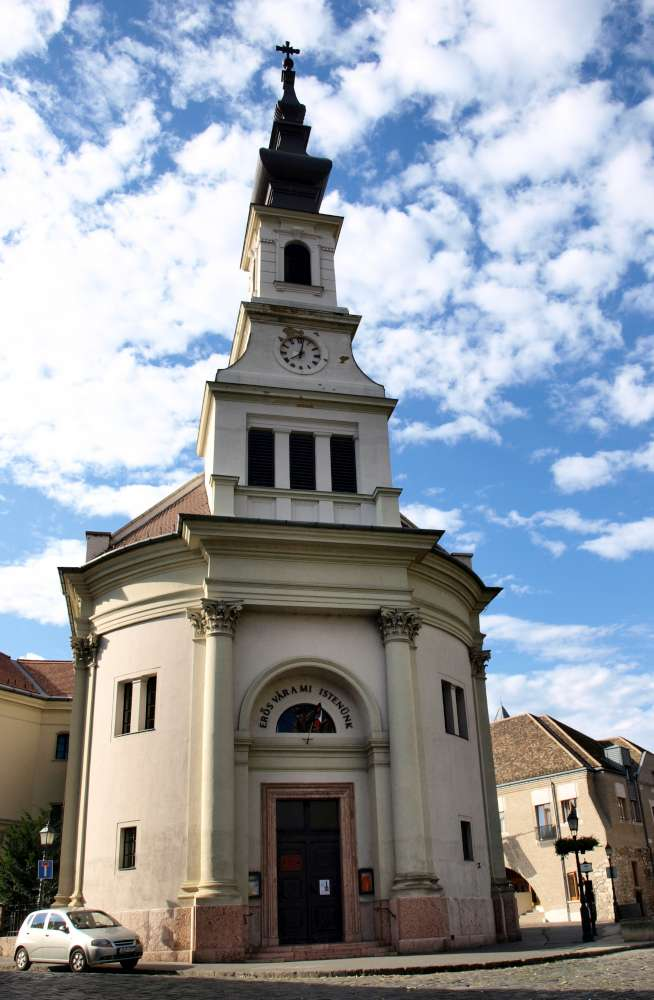
Our Lady of the Snows Parish Church

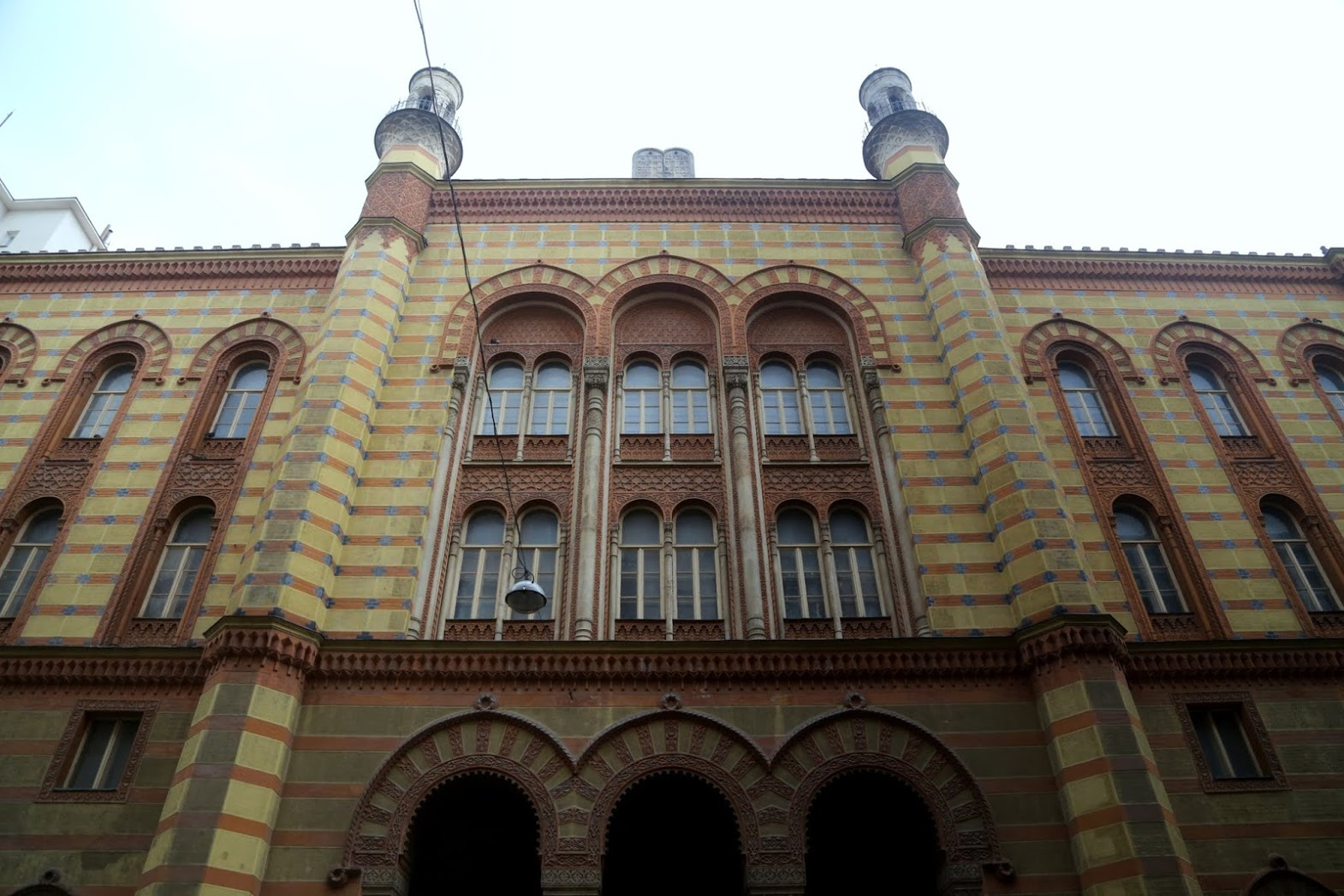
Rumbach Street Synagogue

=== Bridges ===
- Árpád Bridge, the busiest bridge (1950)
- Margaret Bridge, the second oldest bridge (1876)
- Széchenyi Chain Bridge, the oldest and most famous bridge (1849)
- Elisabeth Bridge, built across the narrowest part of the Danube (1903)
- Liberty Bridge, the third oldest bridge (1896)
- Petőfi Bridge (1937)
- Rákóczi Bridge (1995)
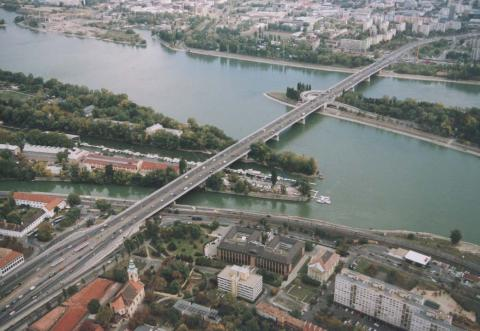
Árpád Bridge

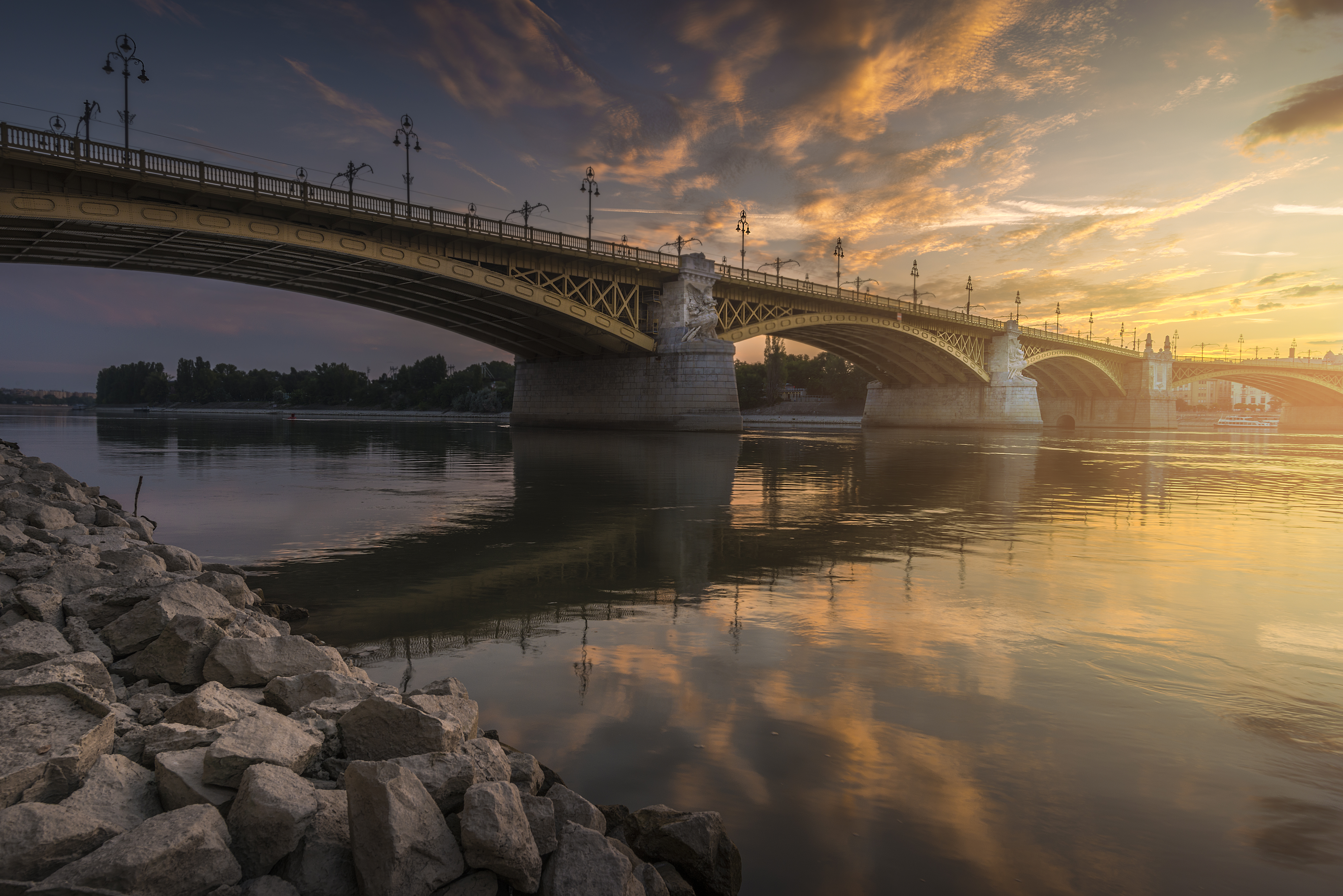
Margaret Bridge

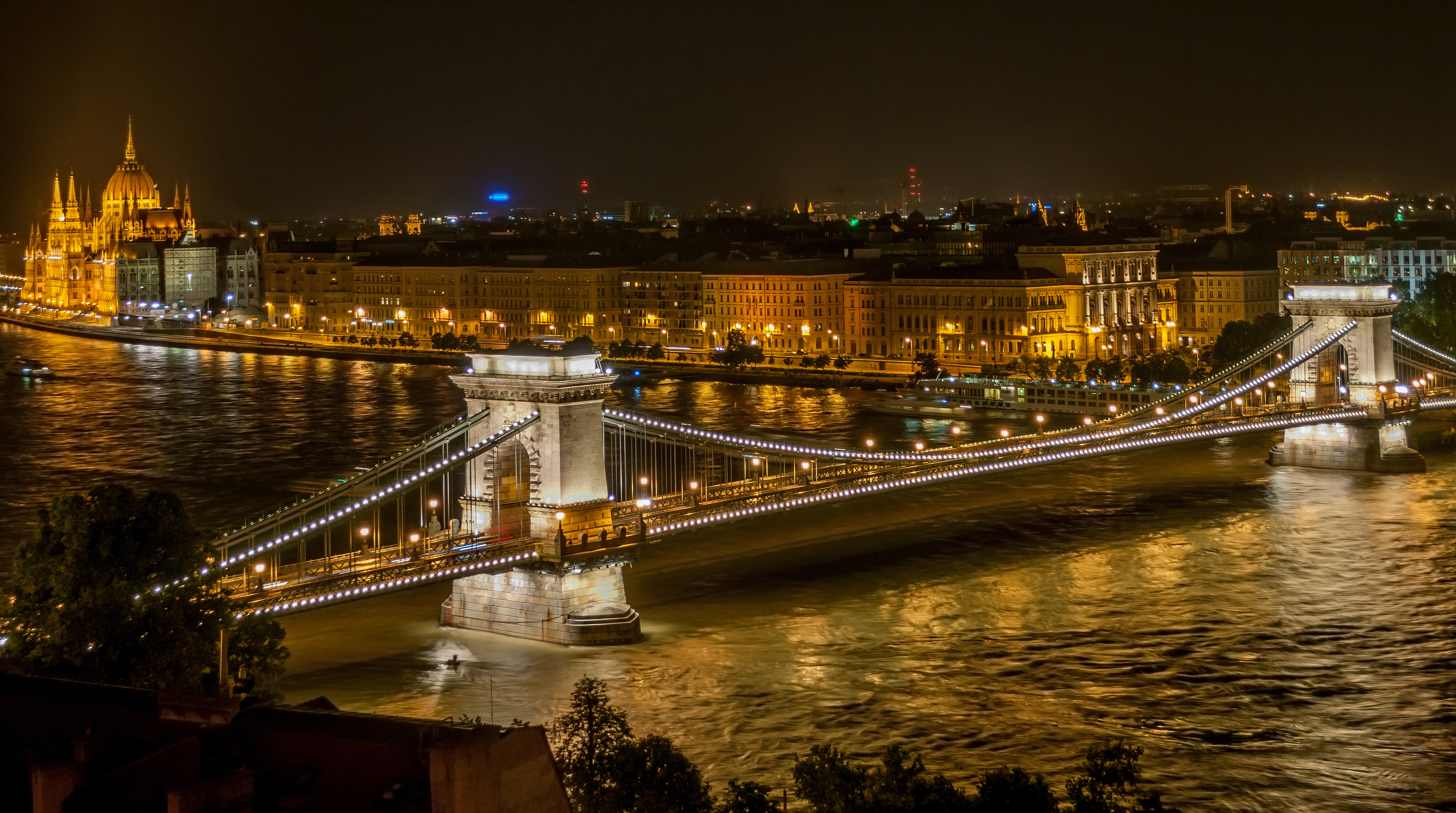
Chain Bridge

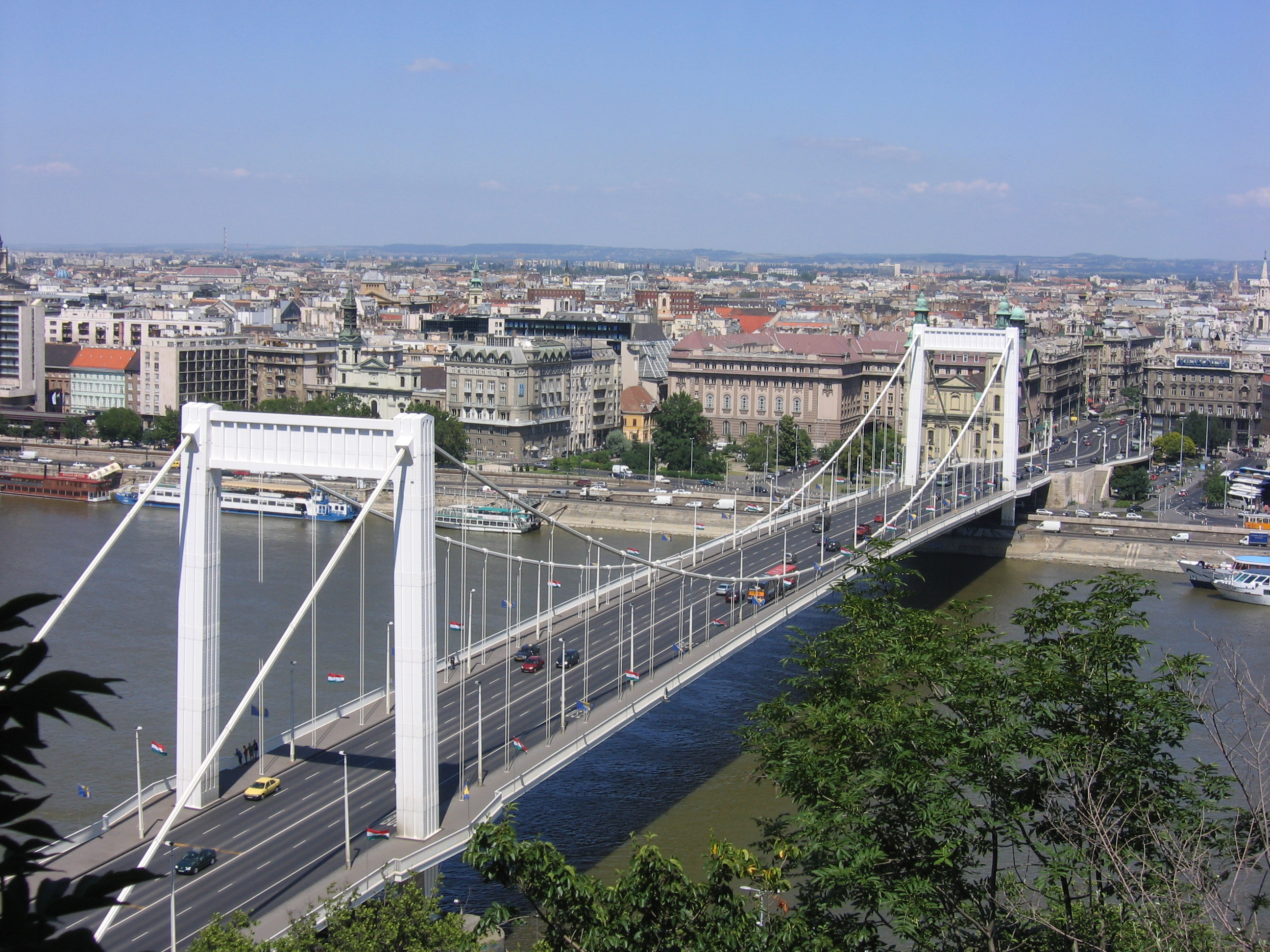
Elisabeth Bridge

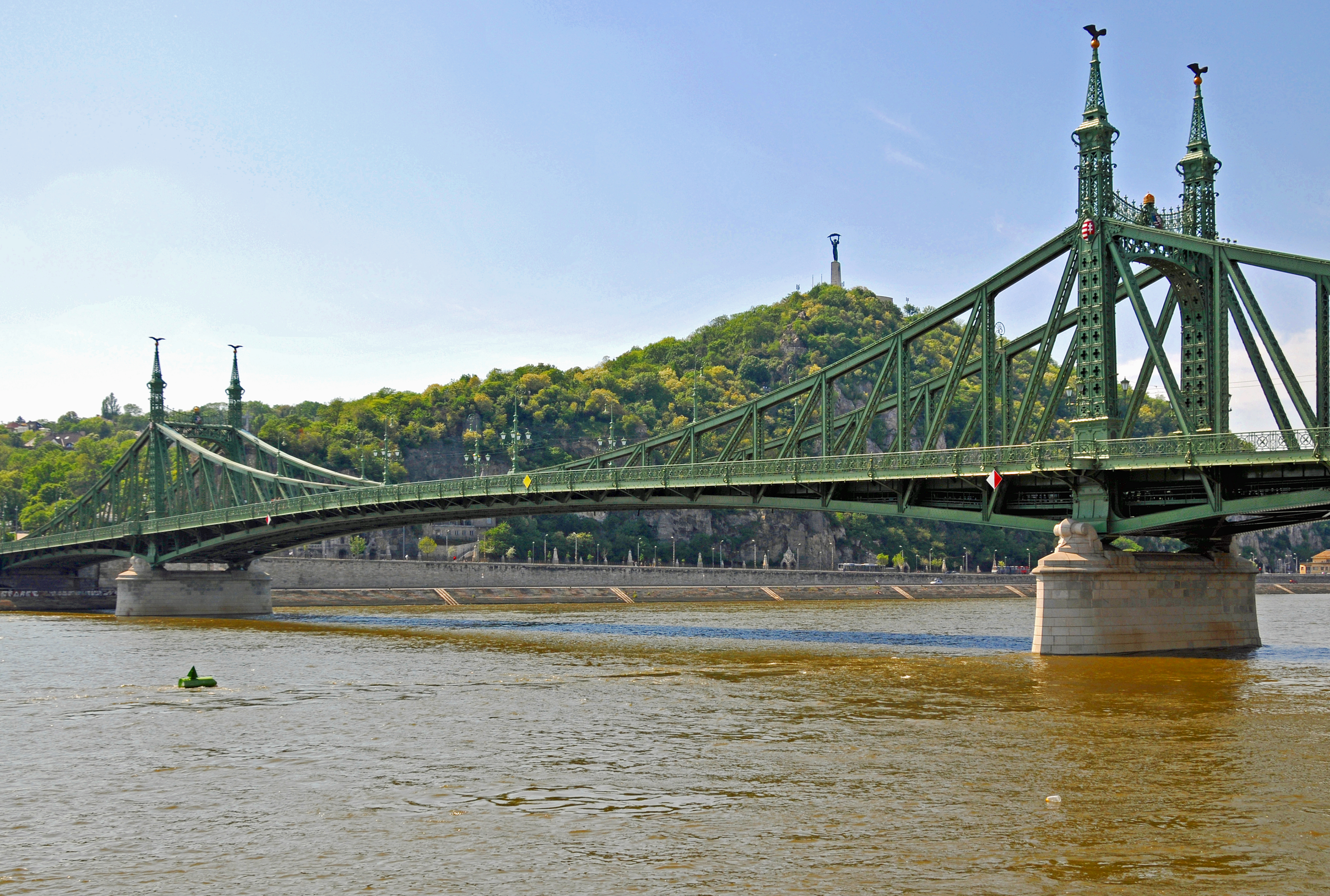
Liberty Bridge

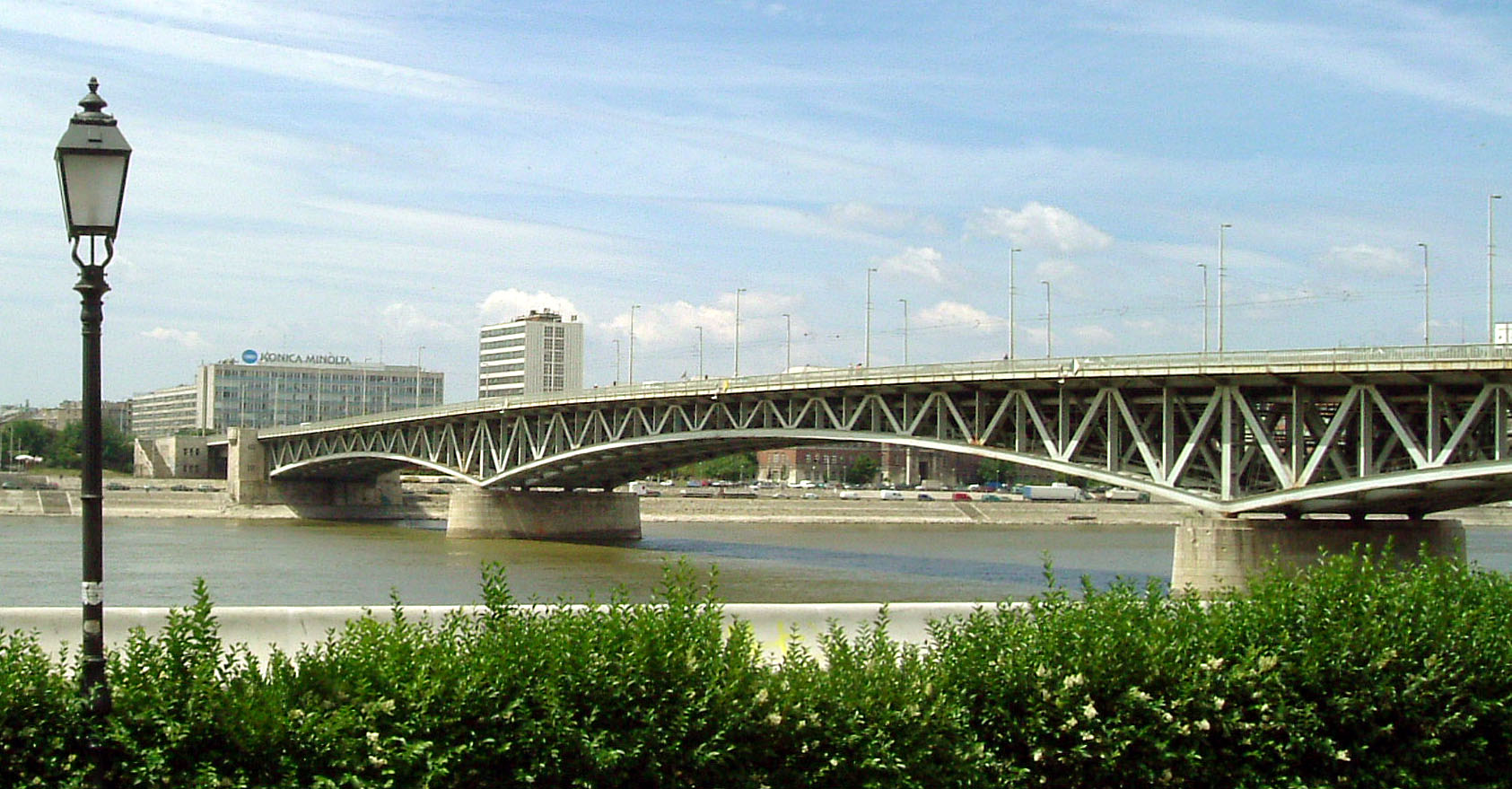
Petőfi Bridge

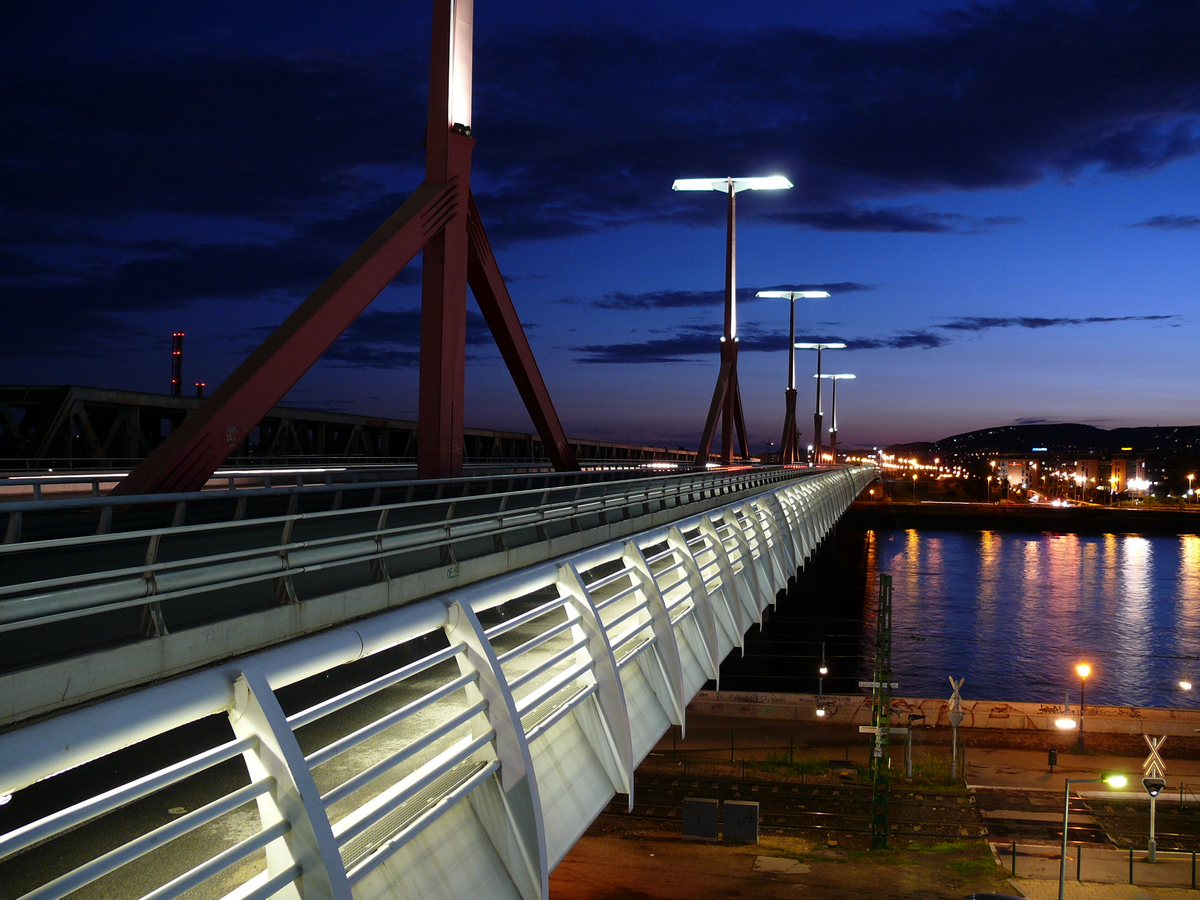
Rákóczi Bridge

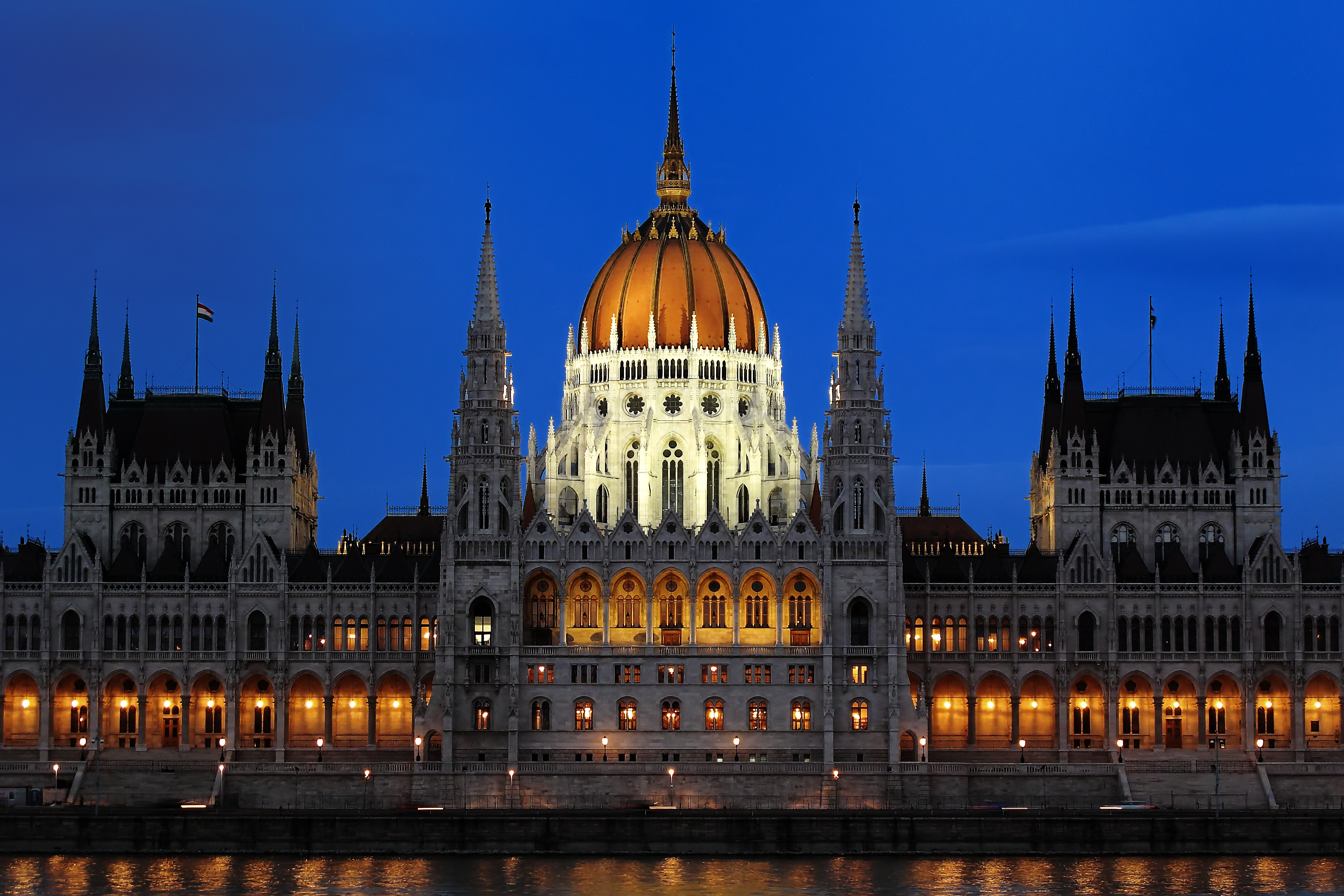
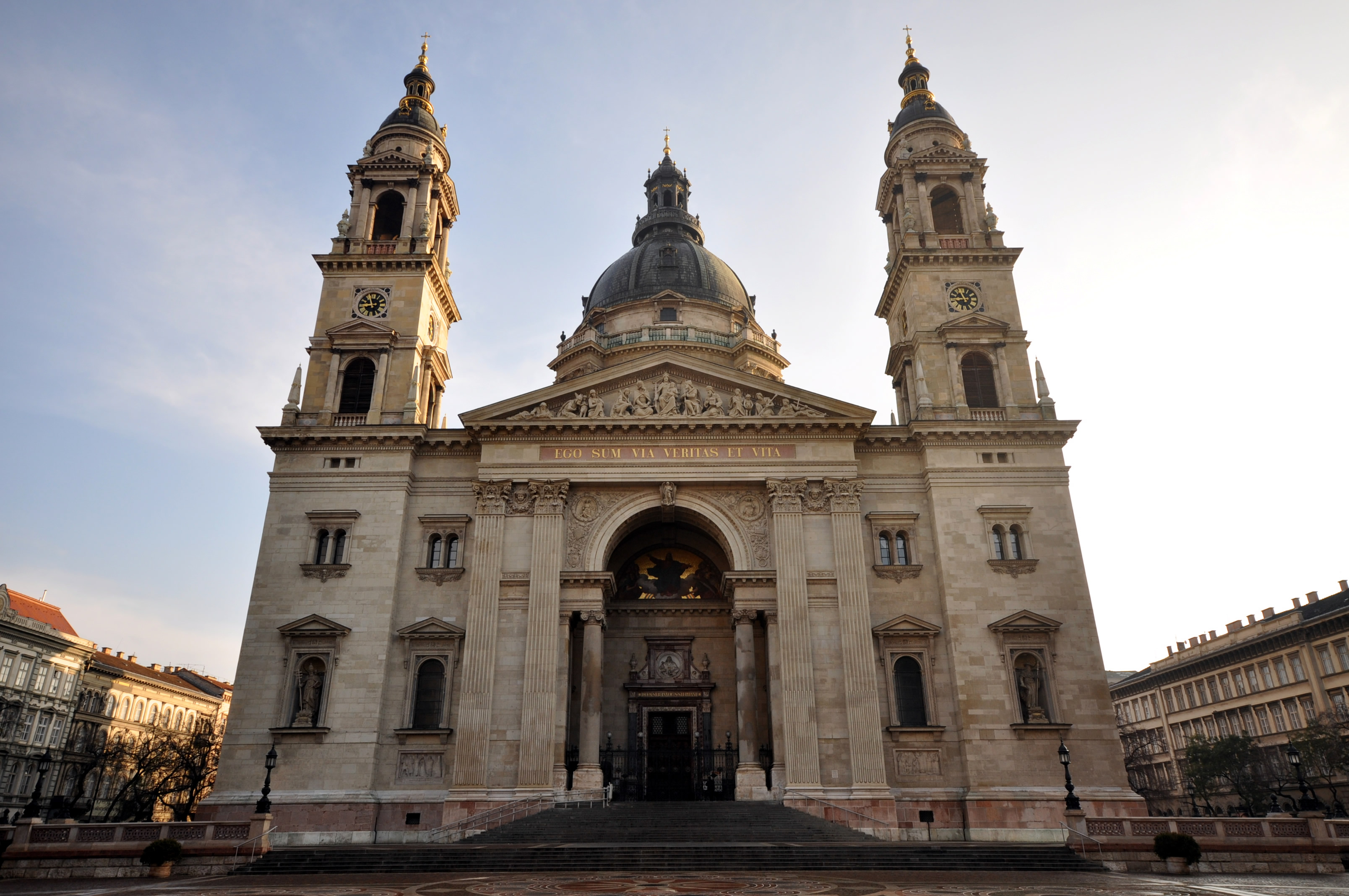
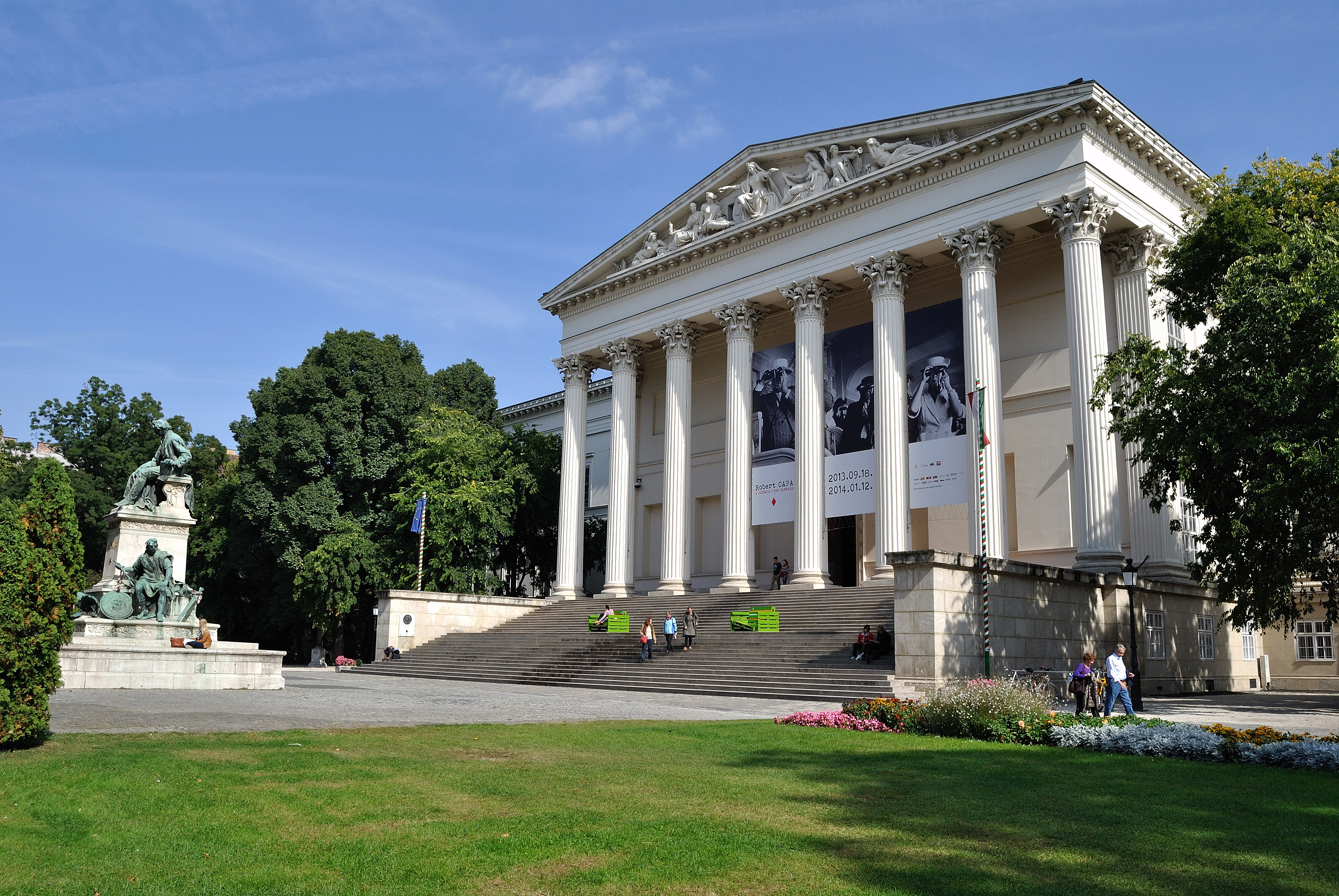
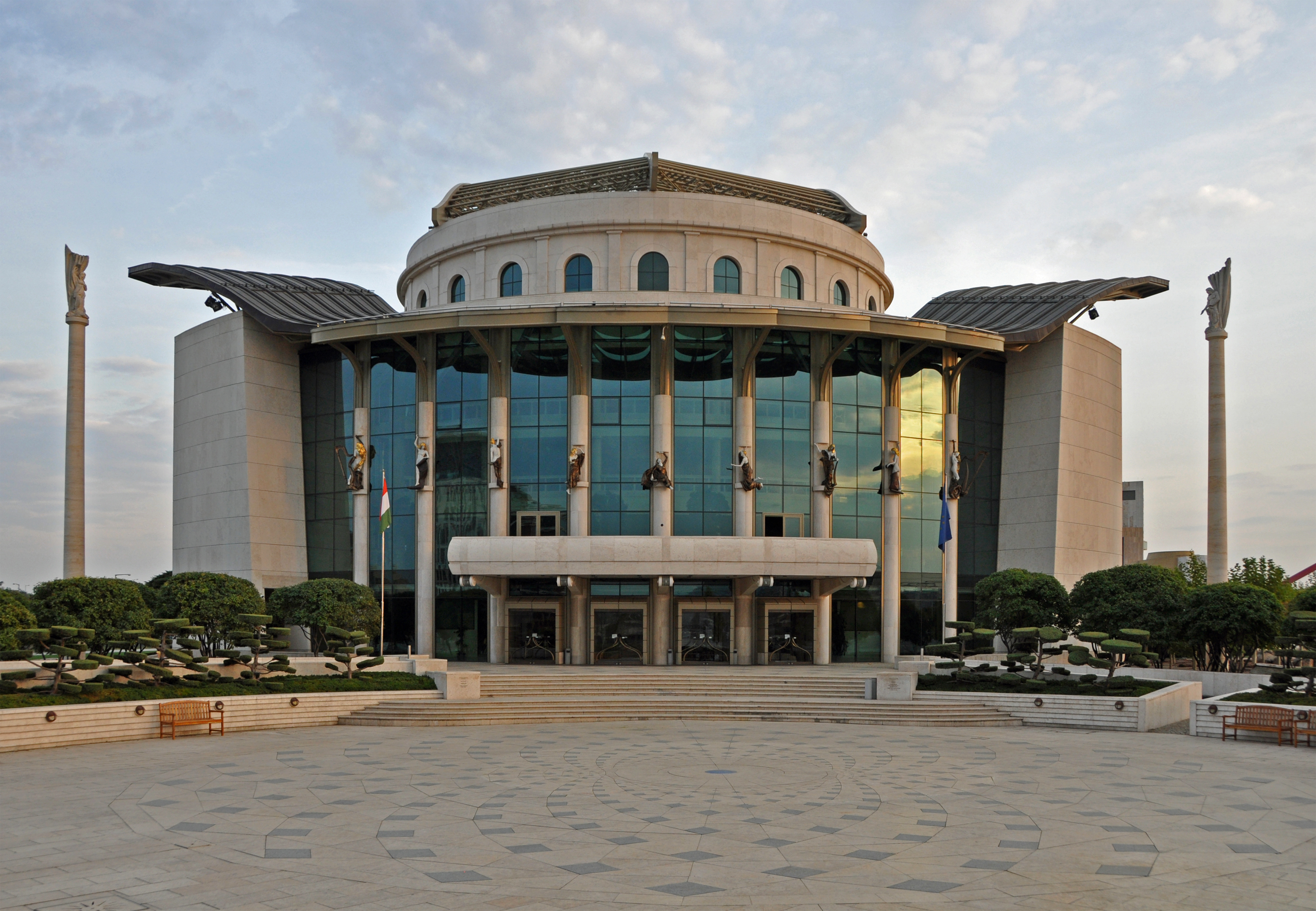
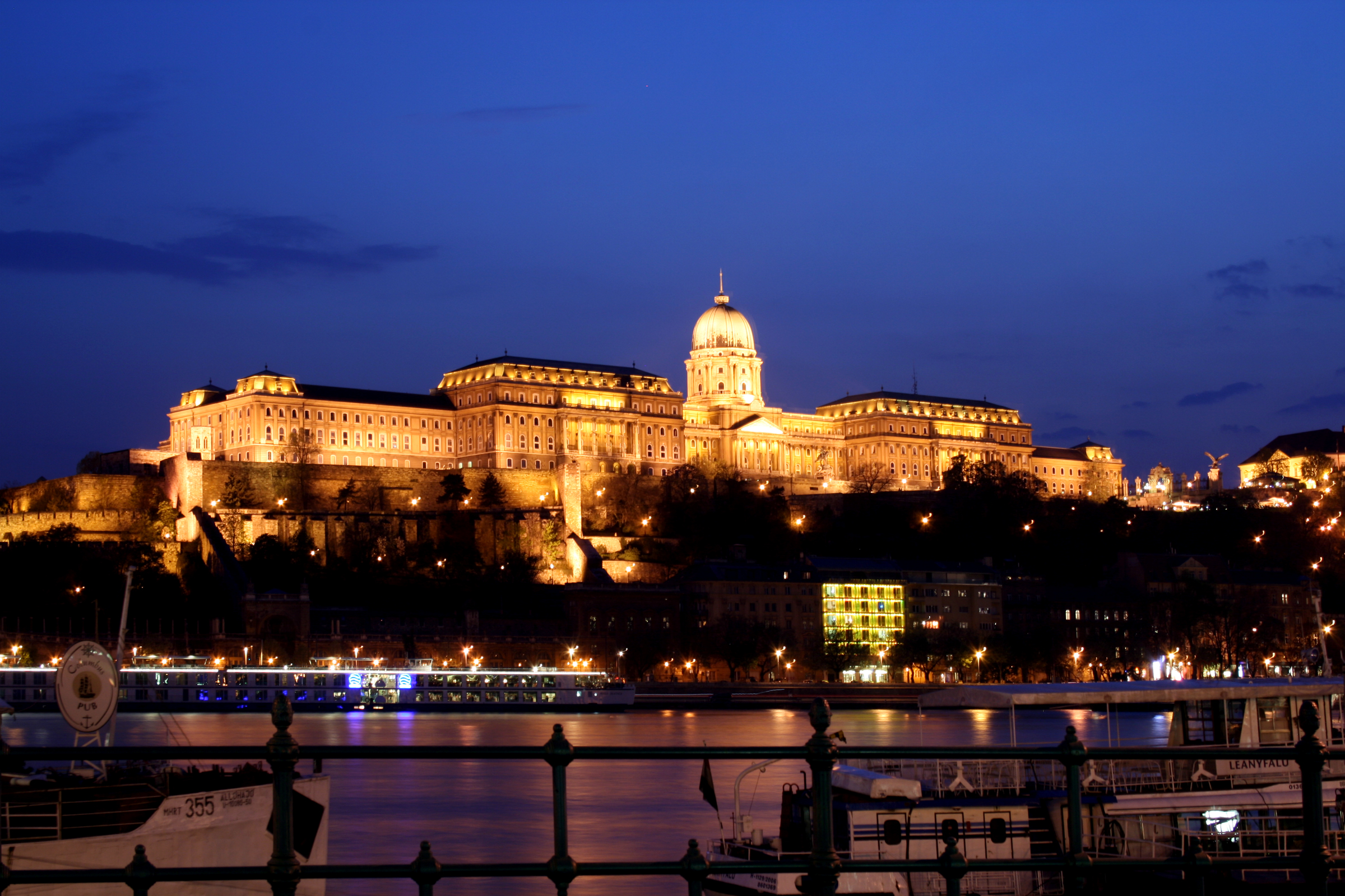
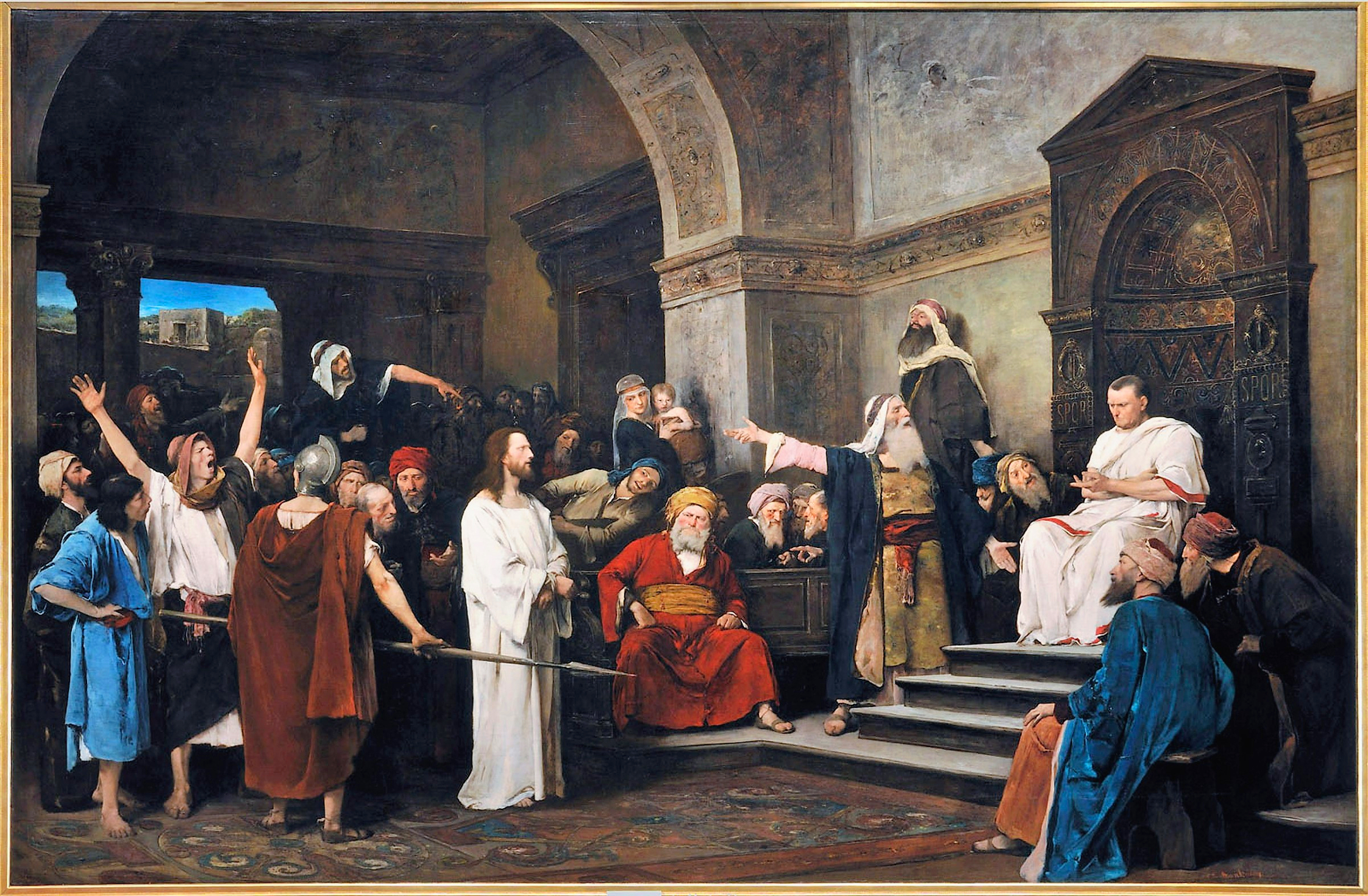
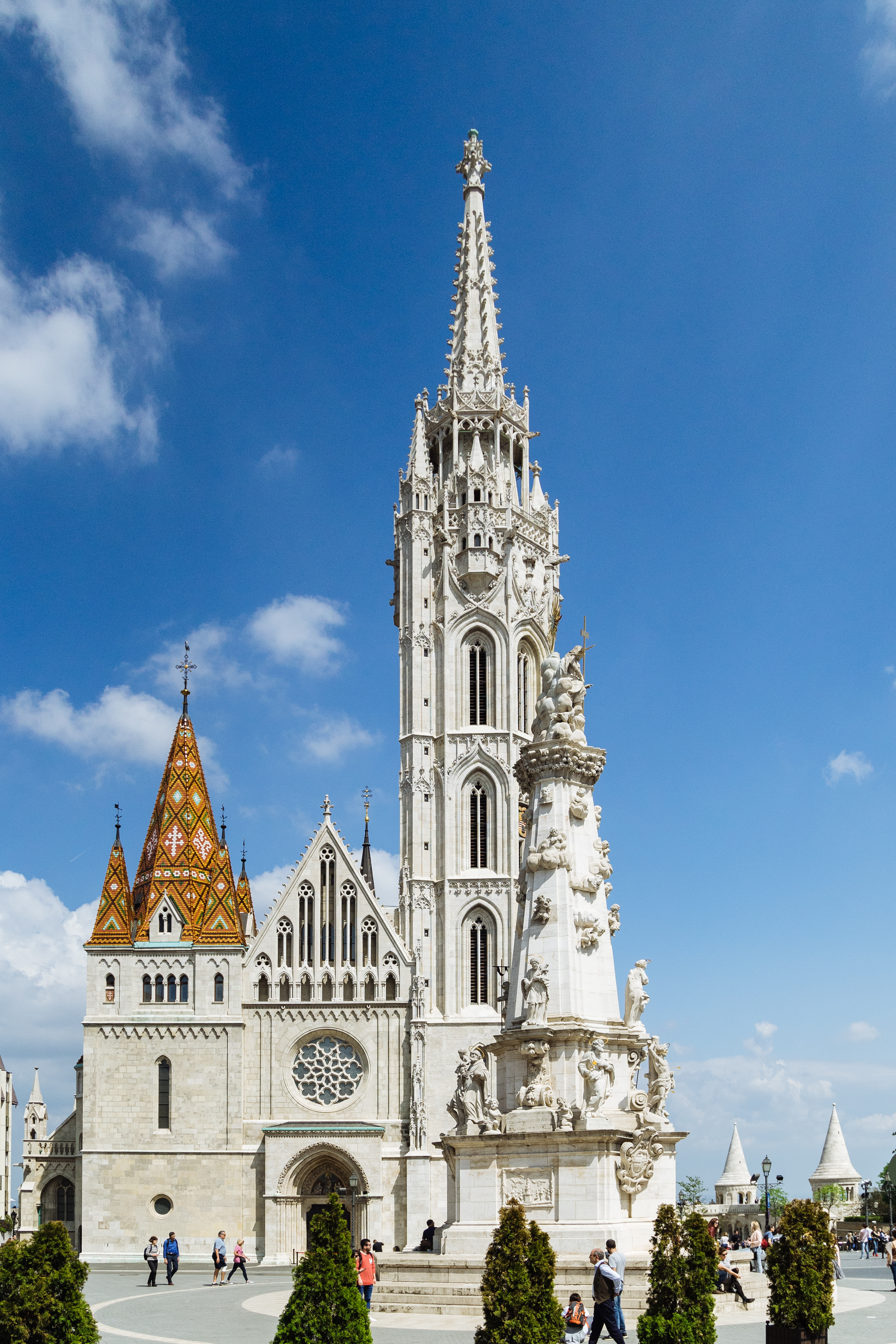
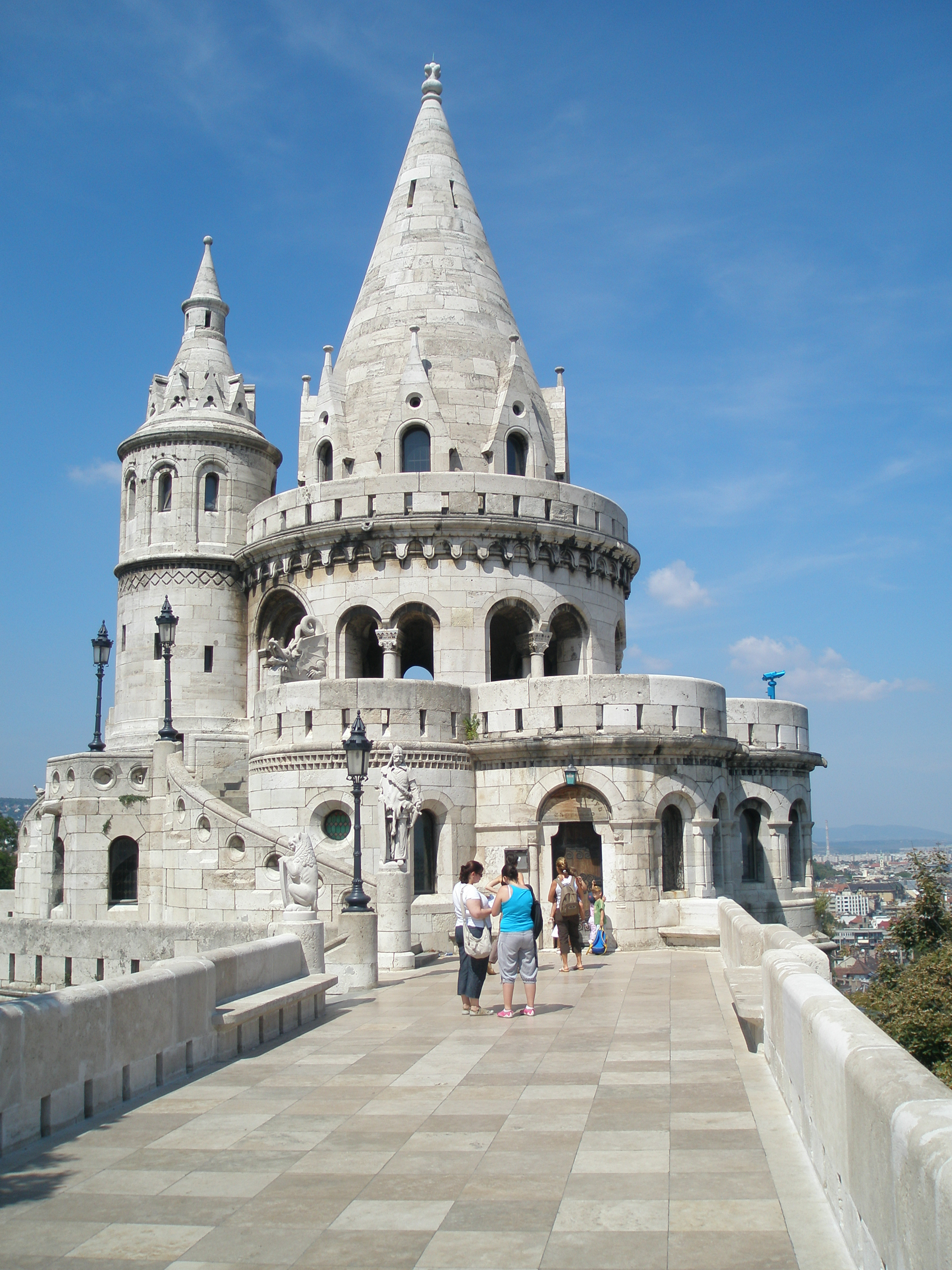
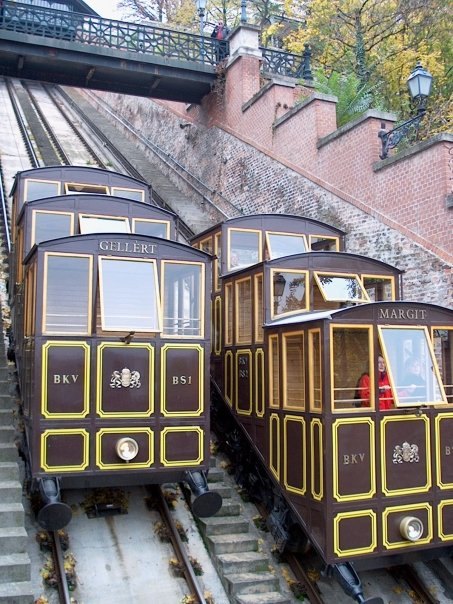
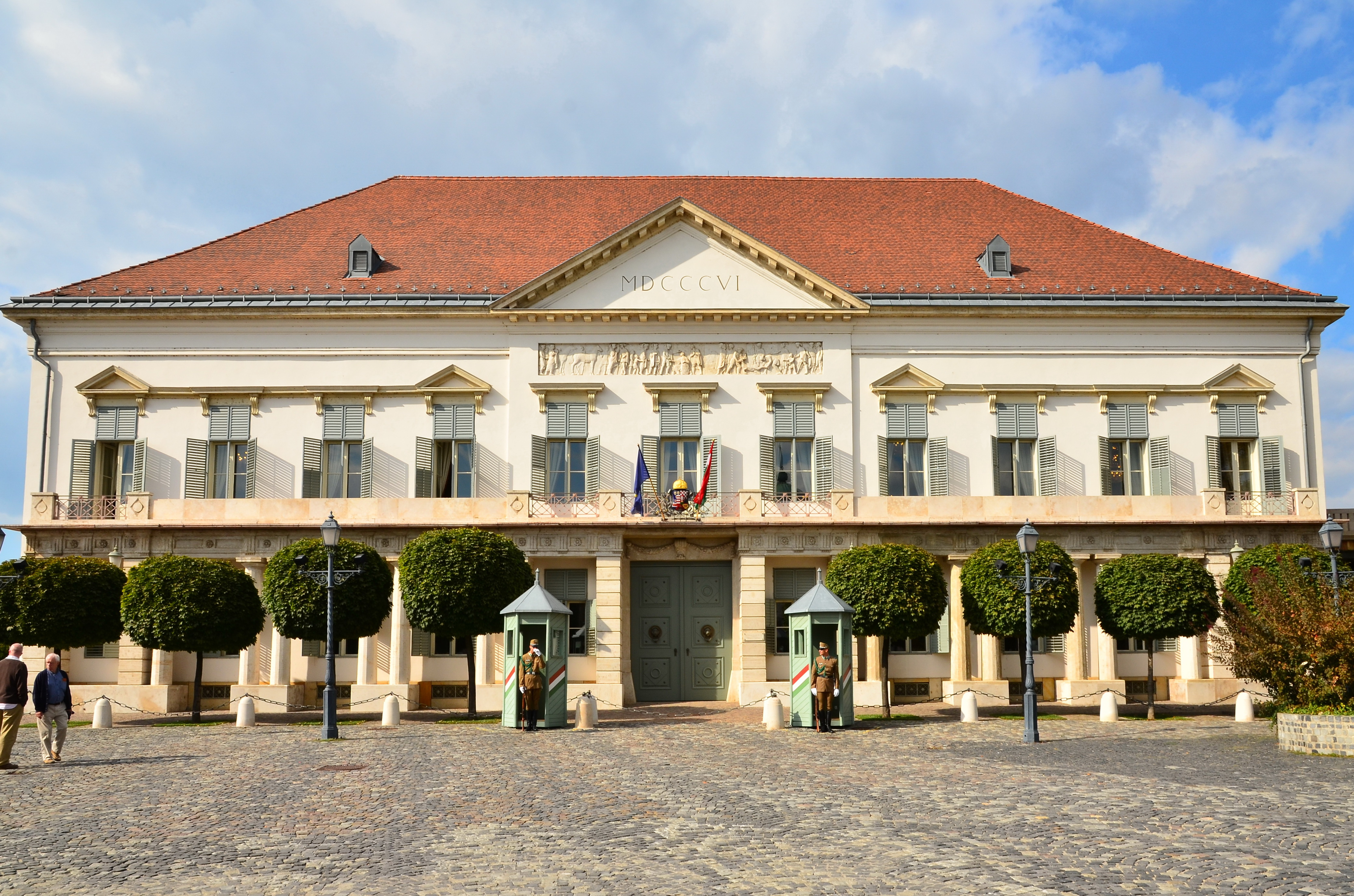
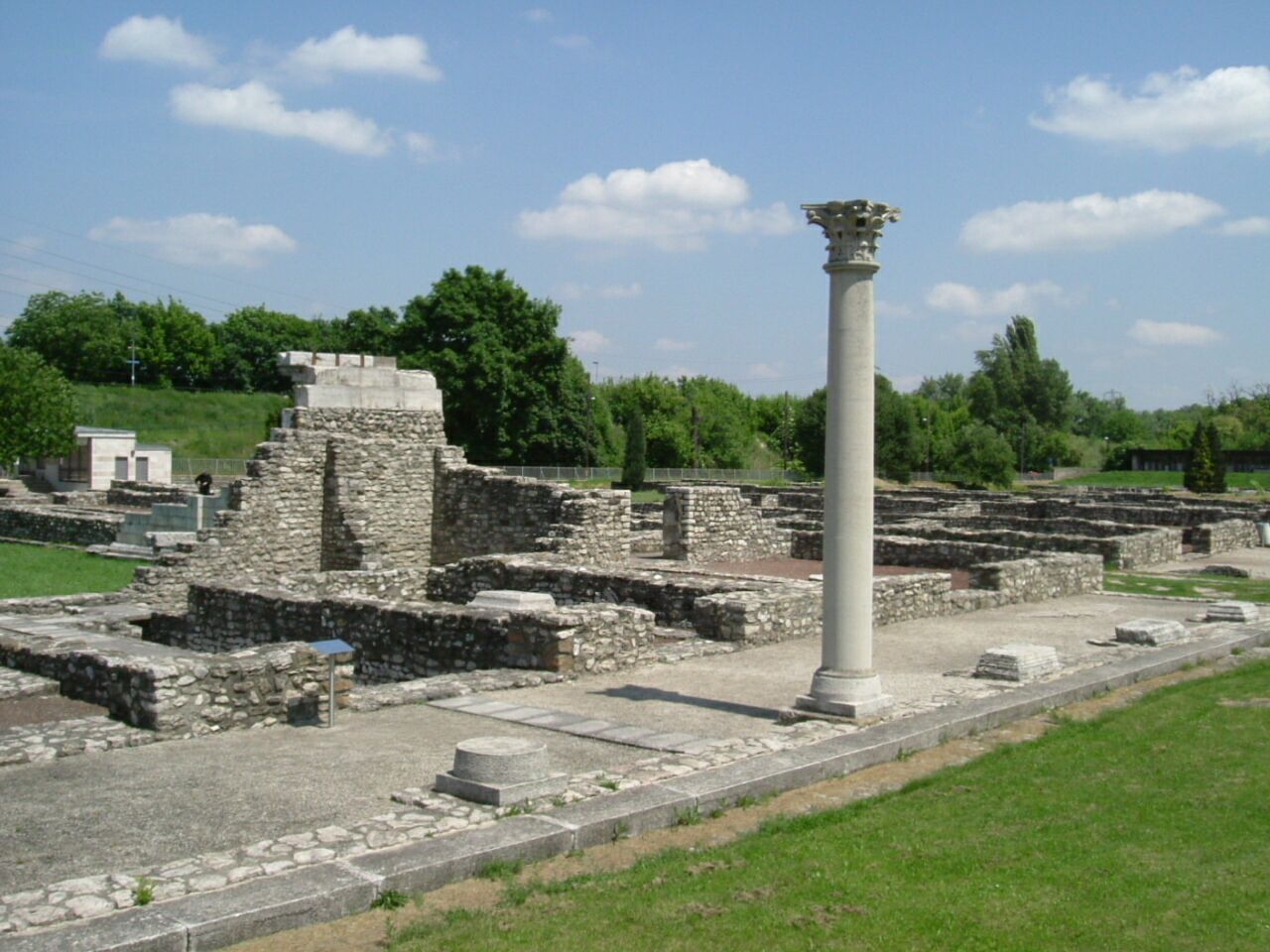
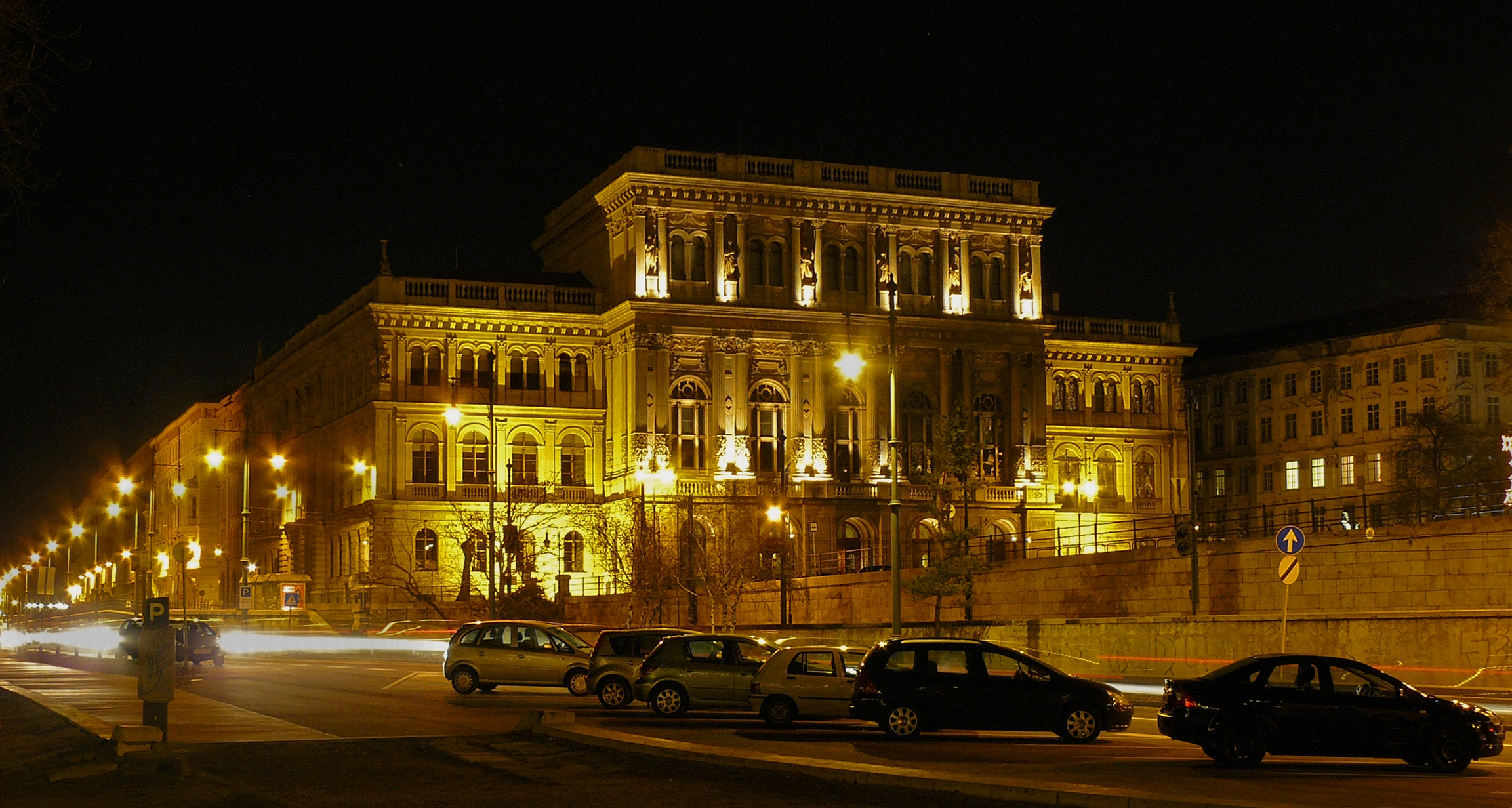
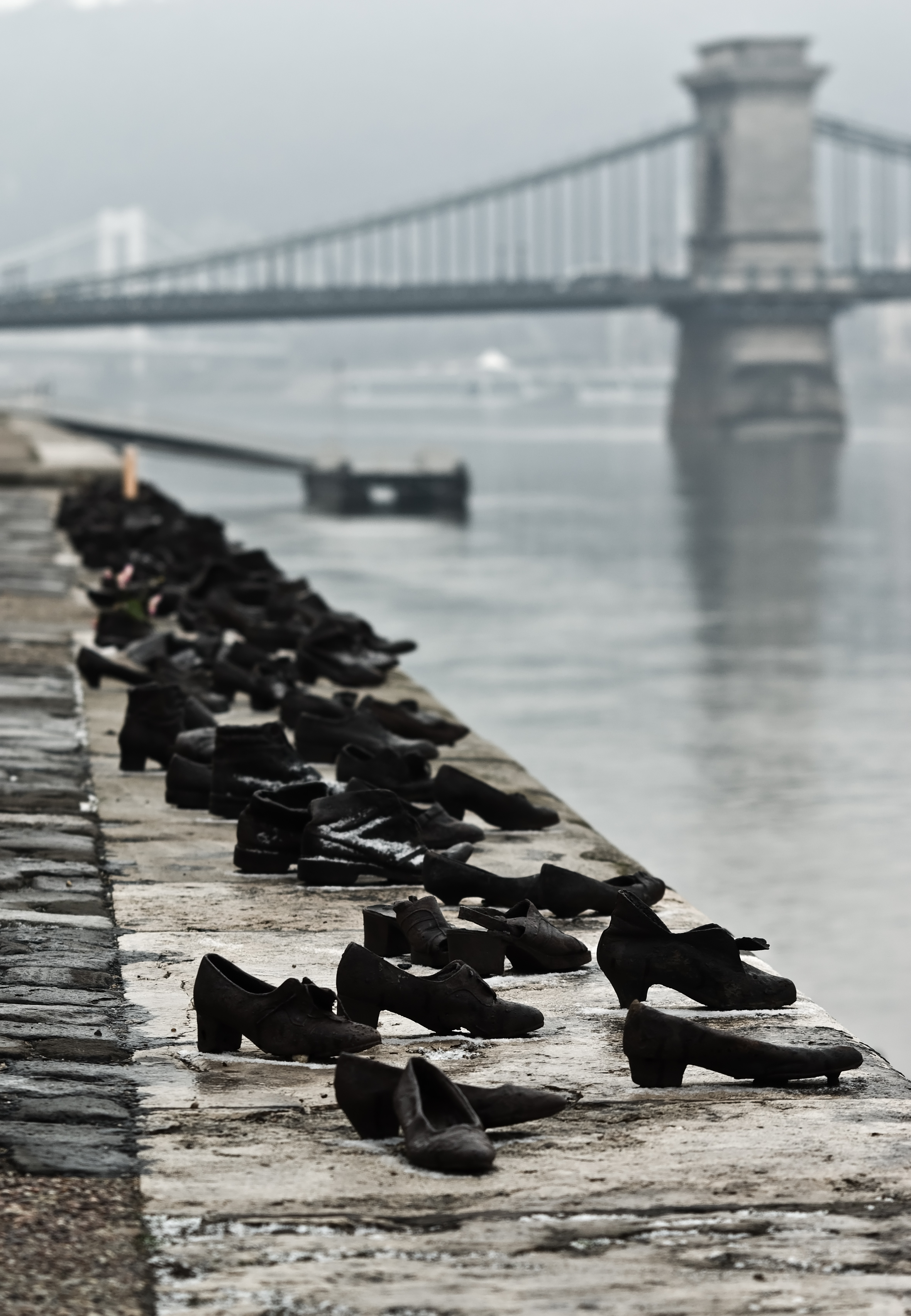
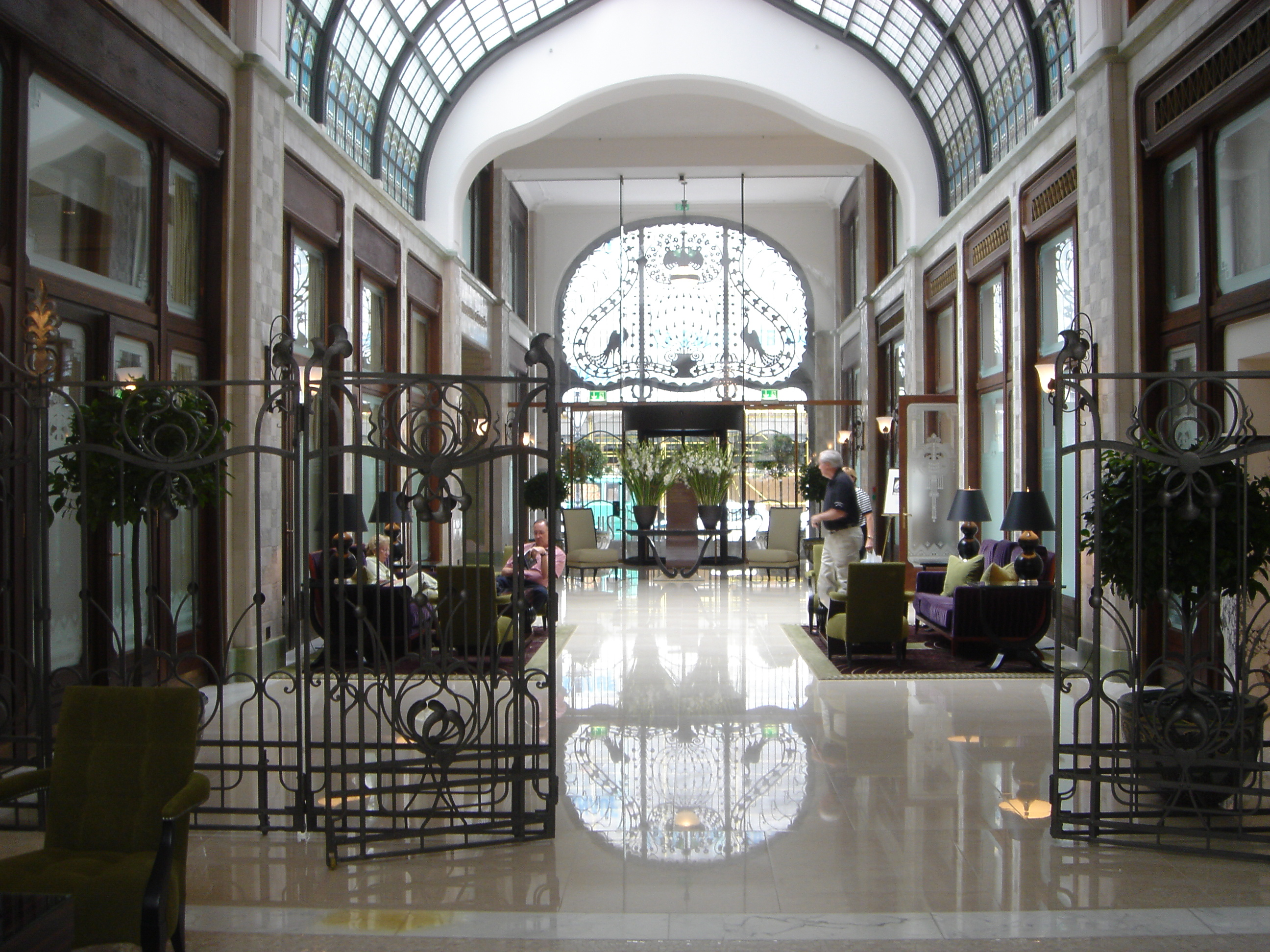
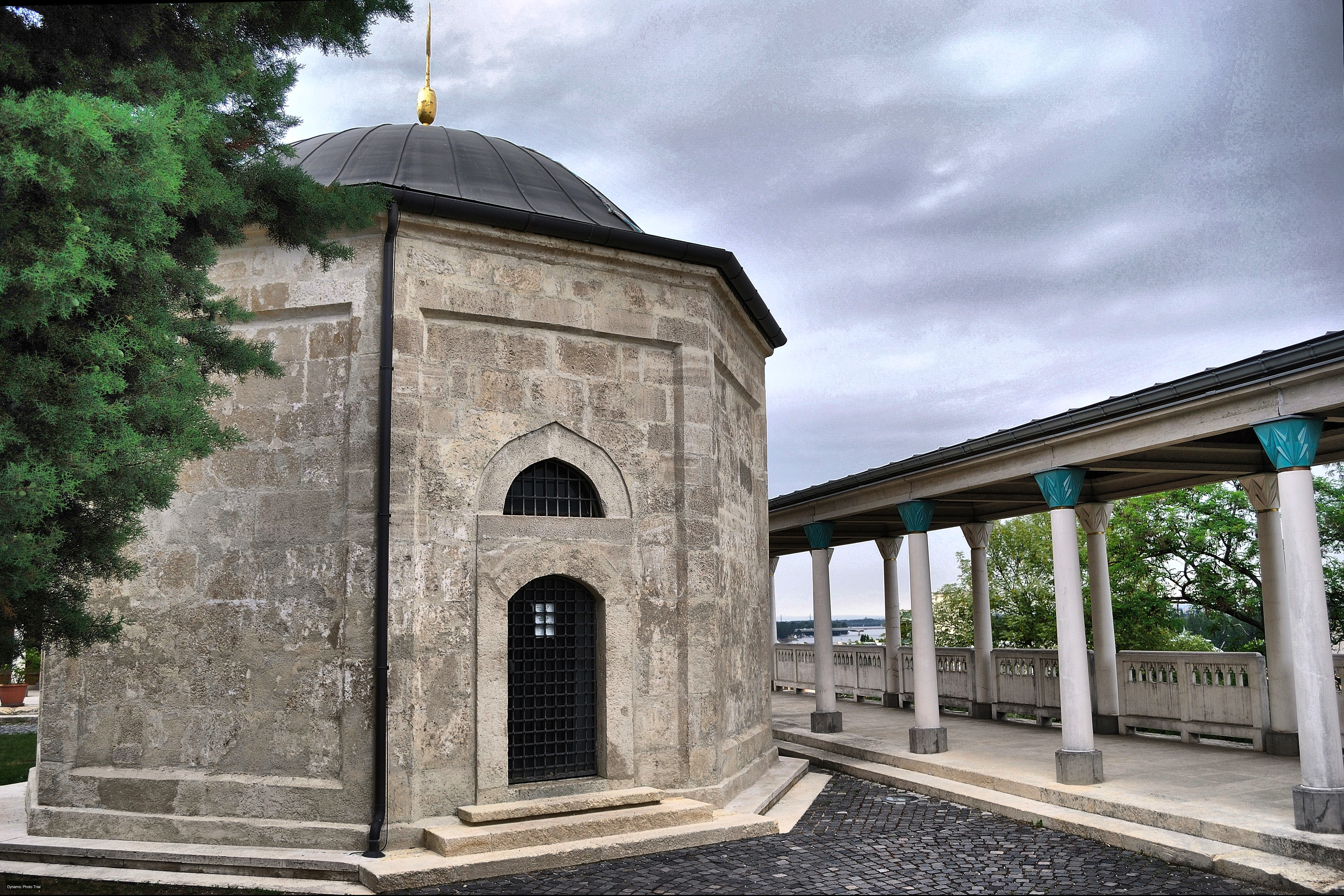
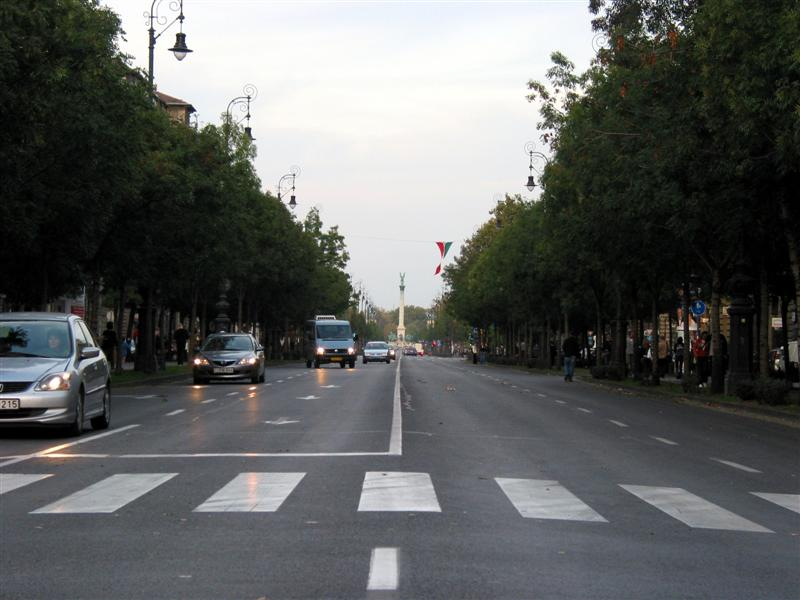
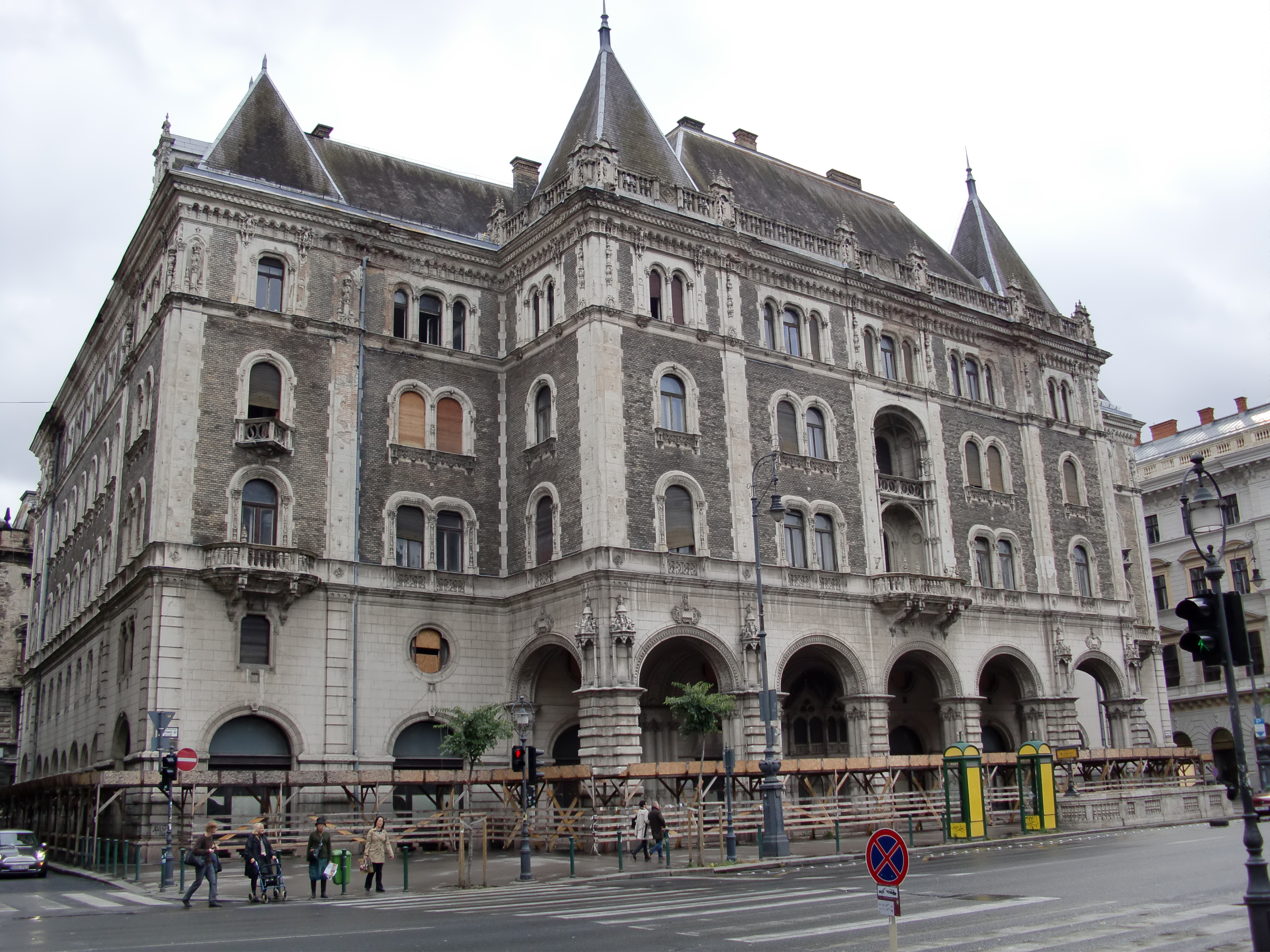
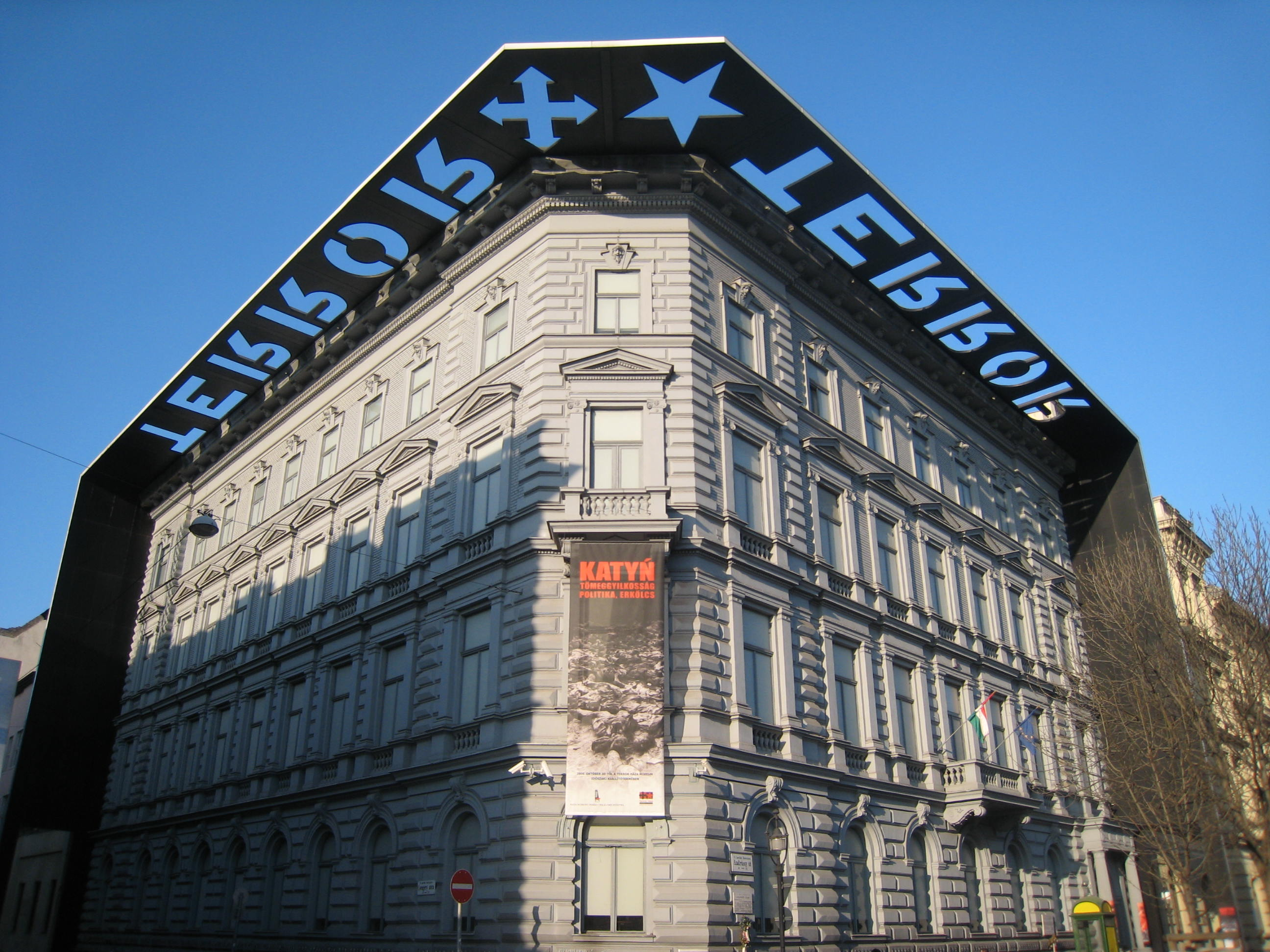
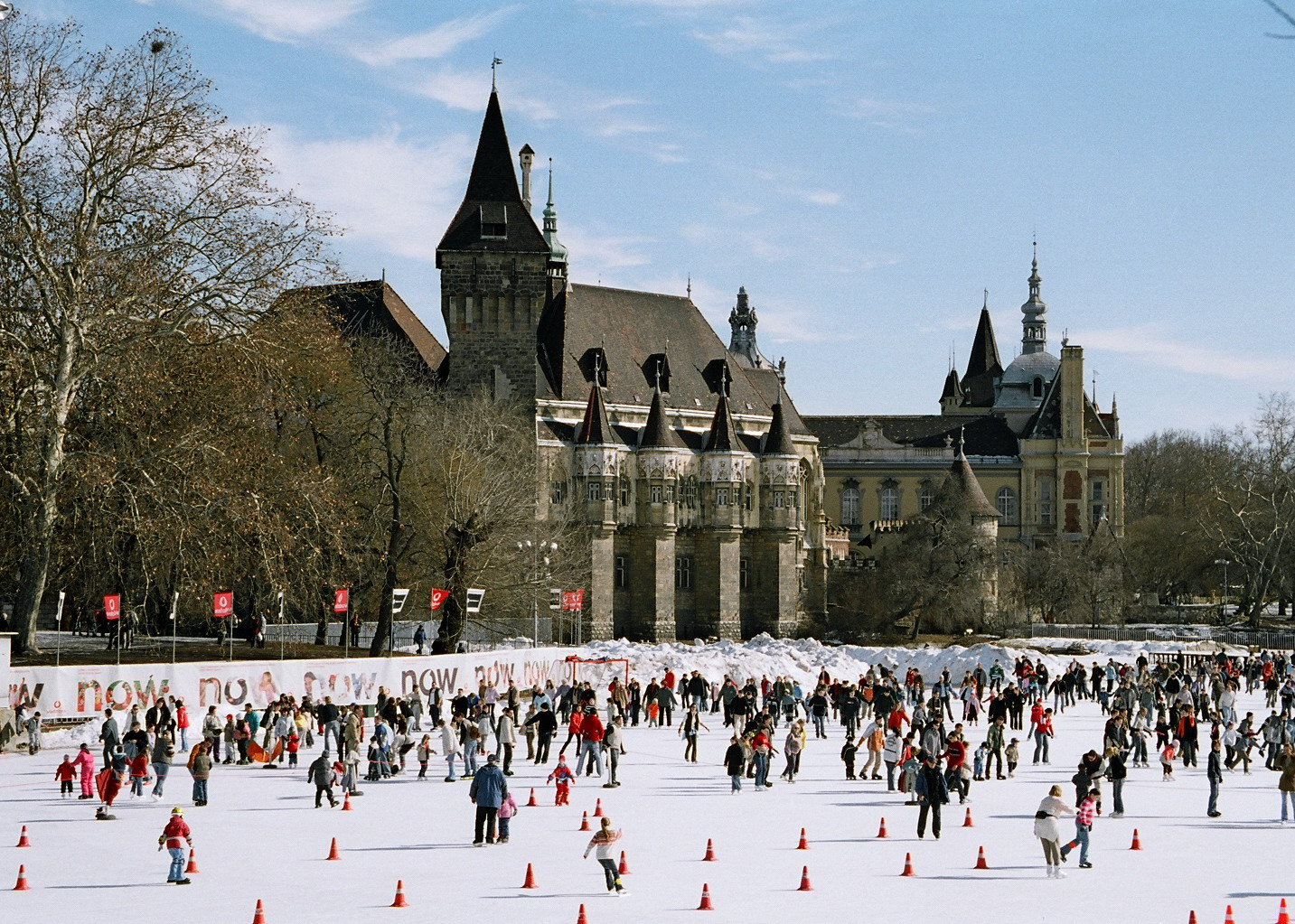
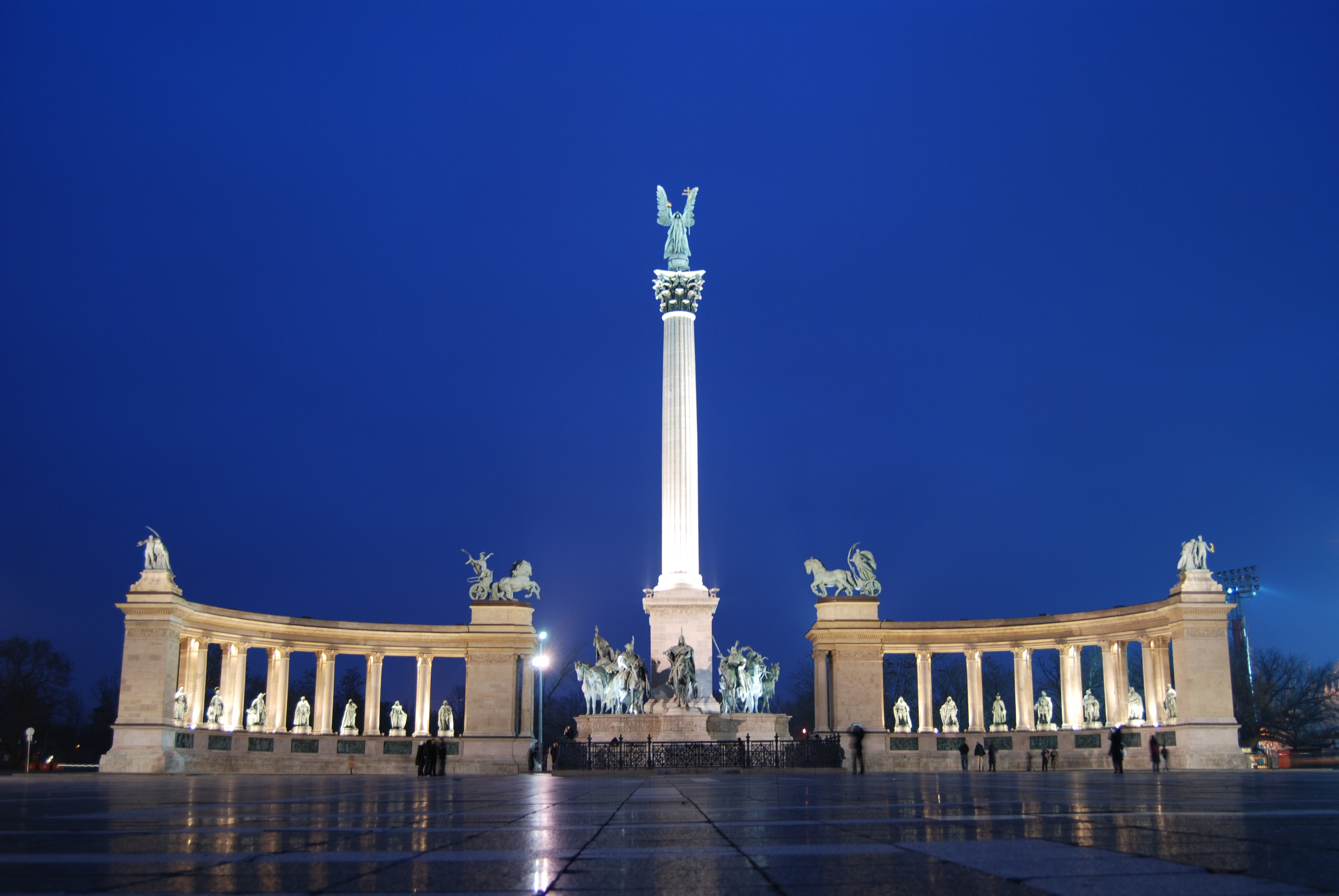
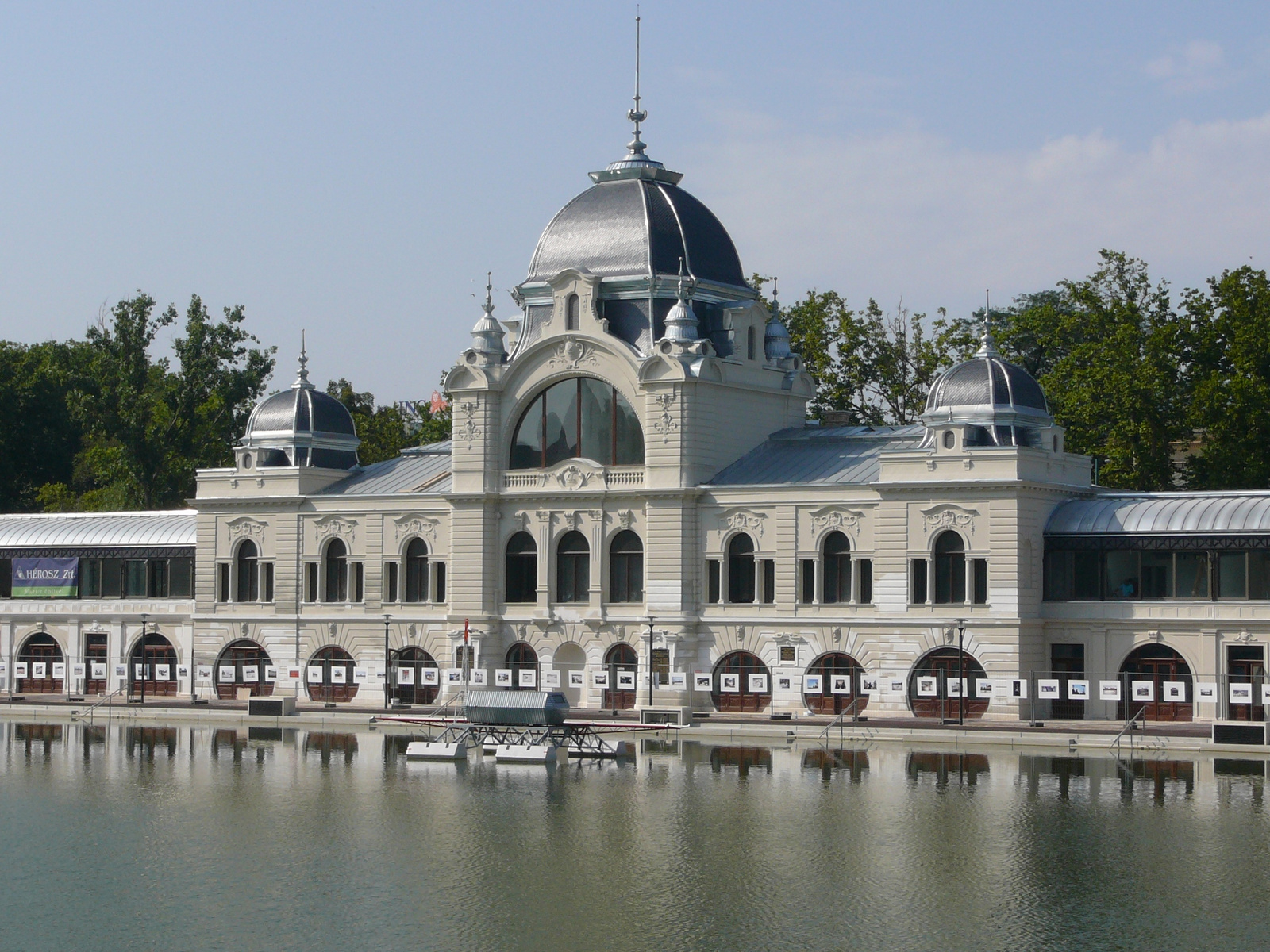
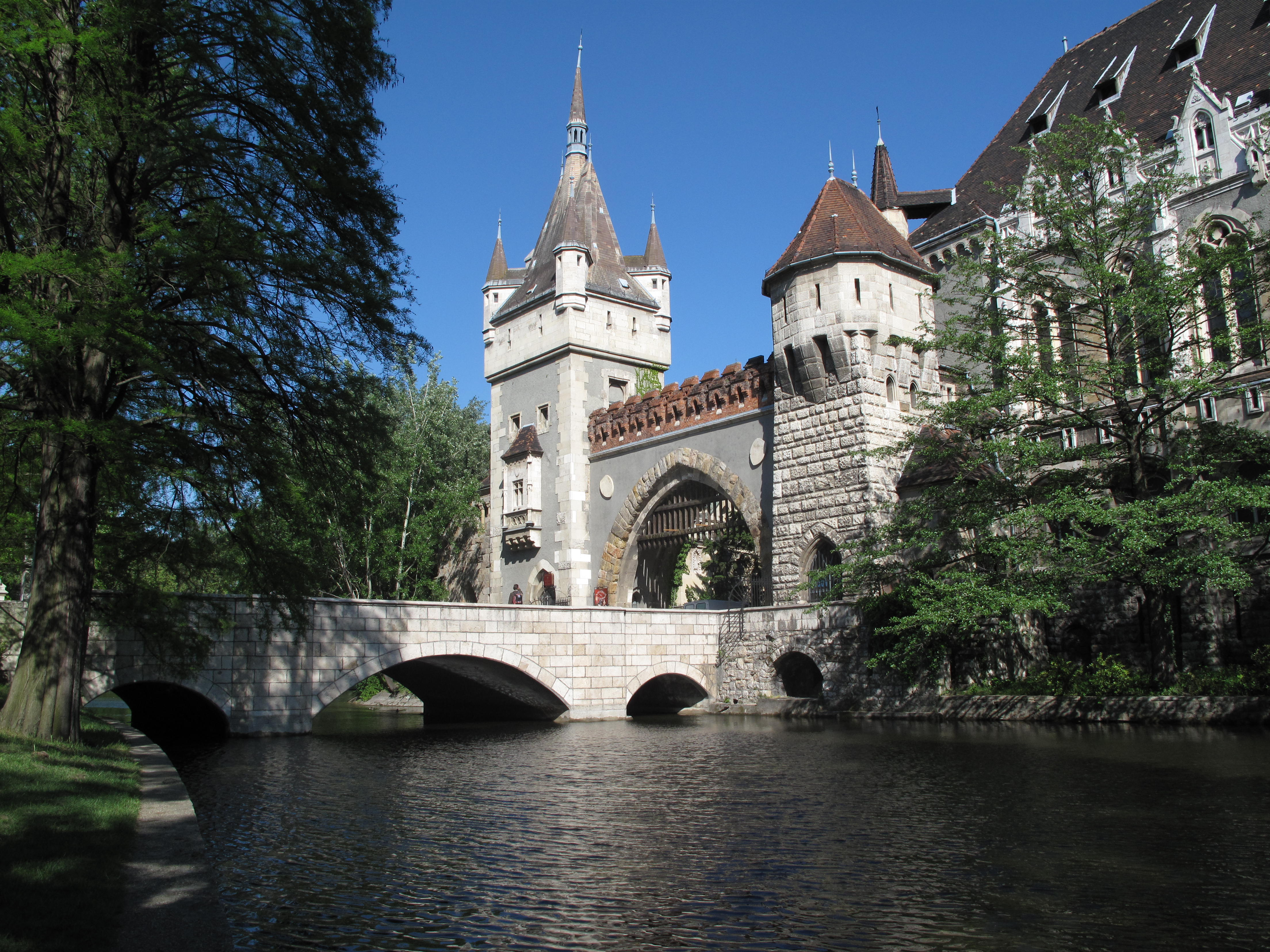
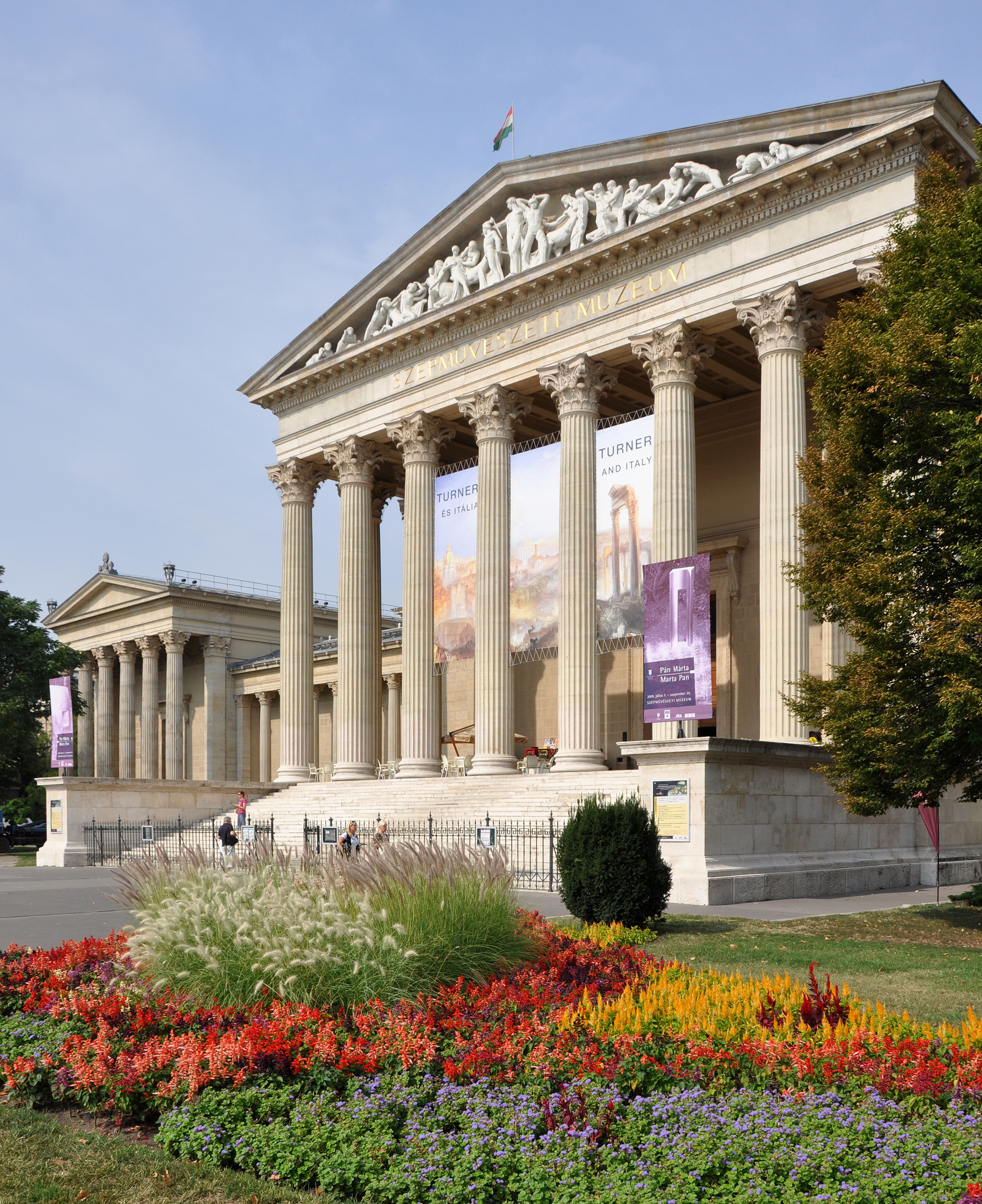
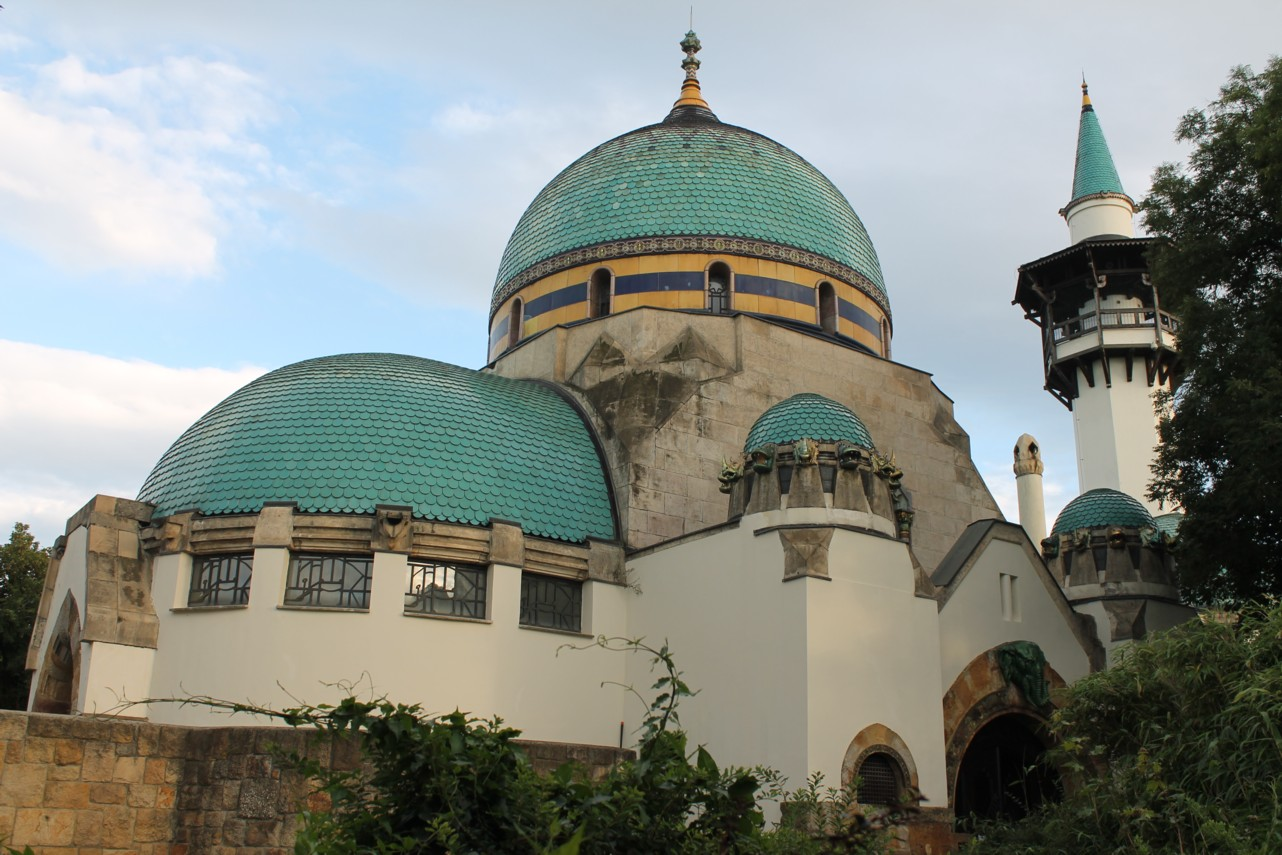
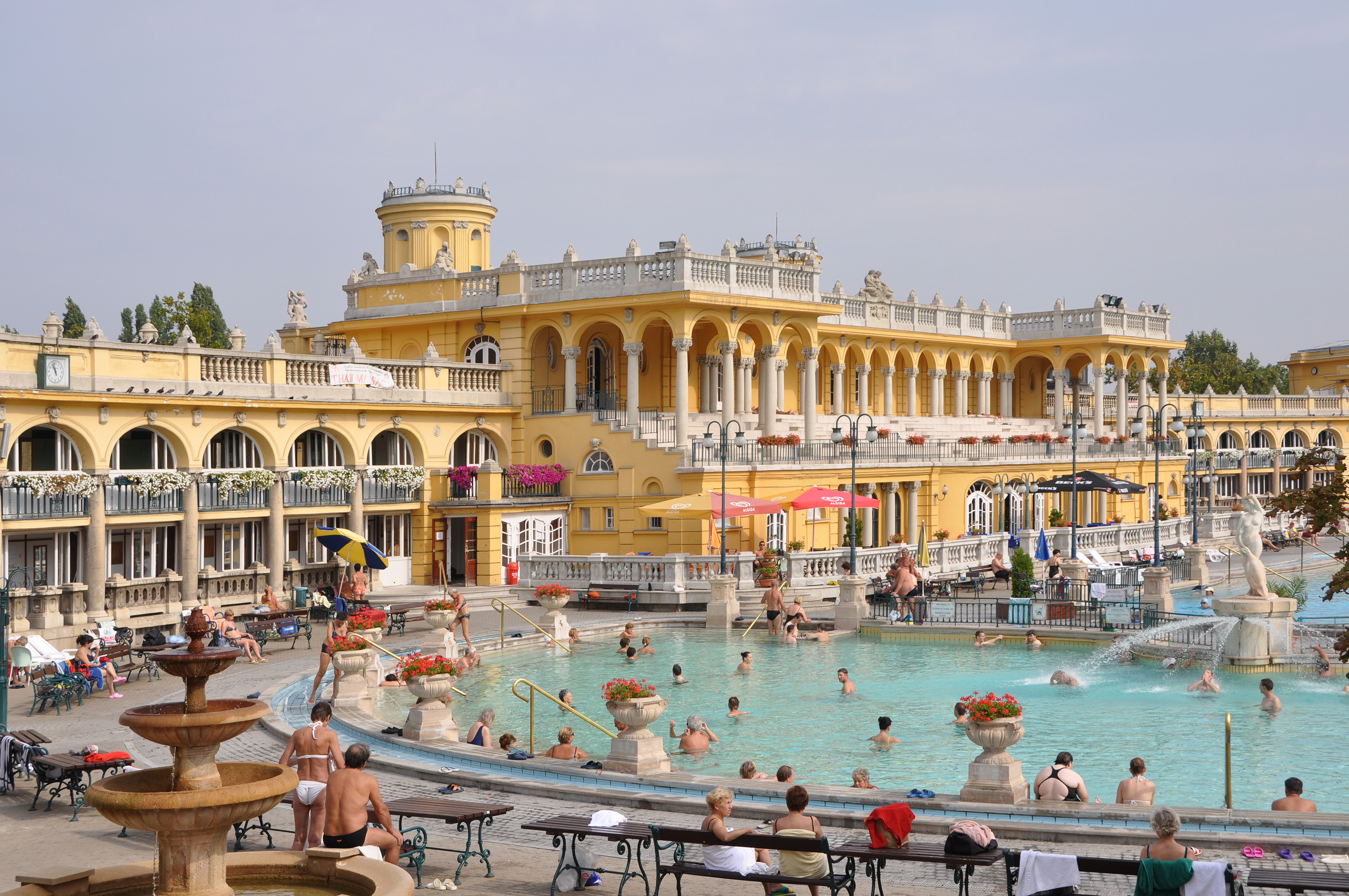
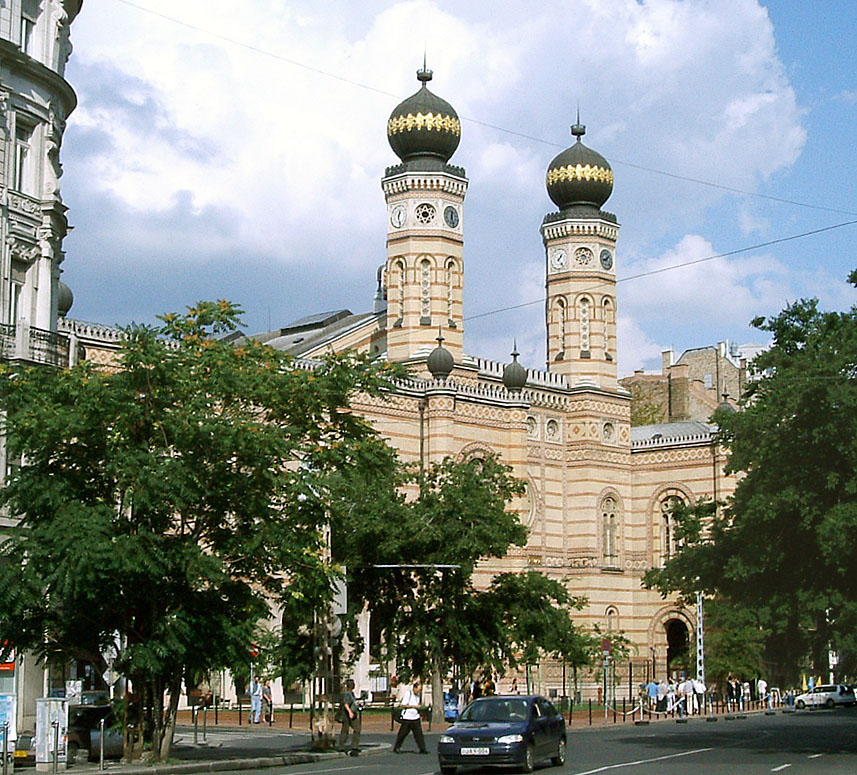
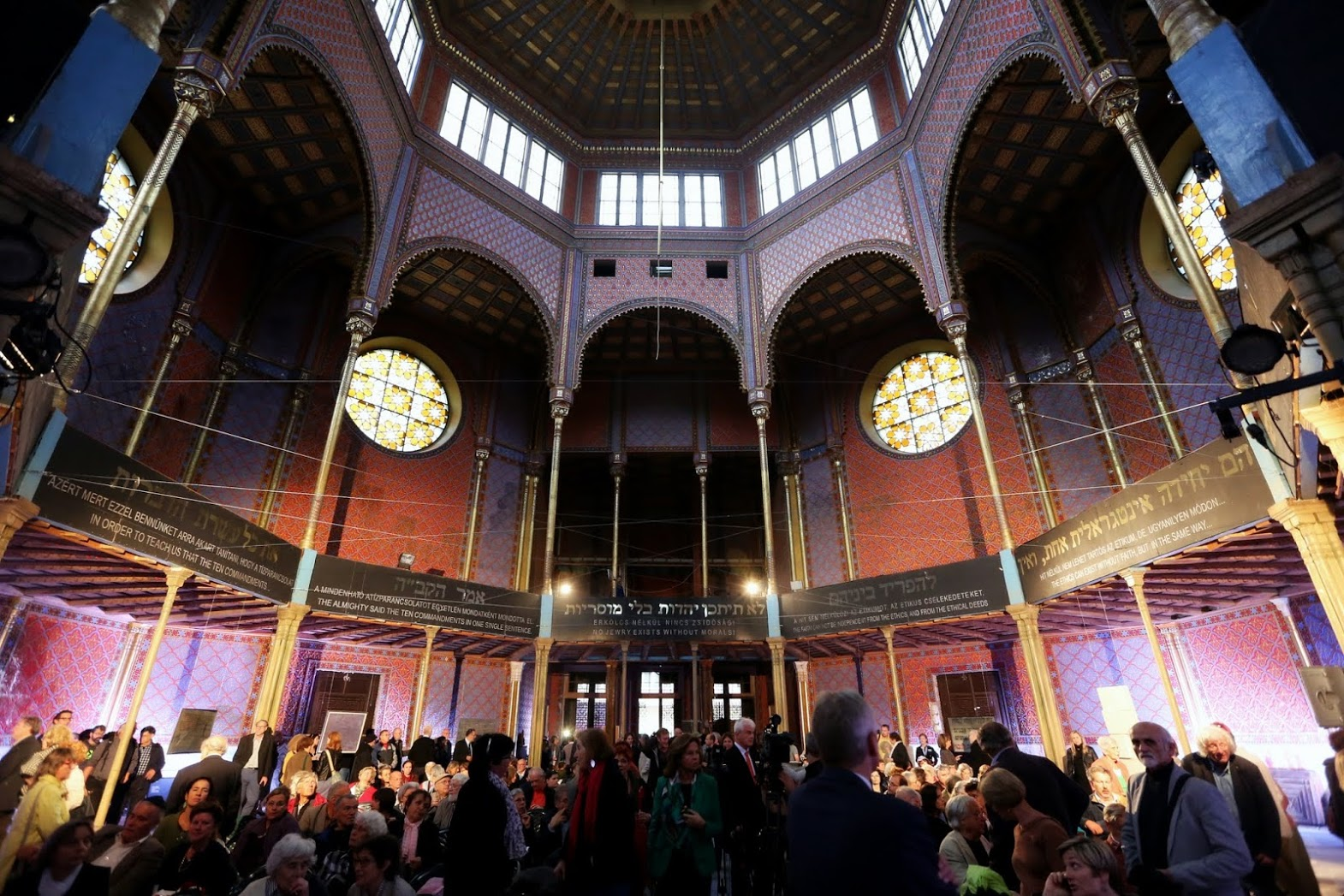
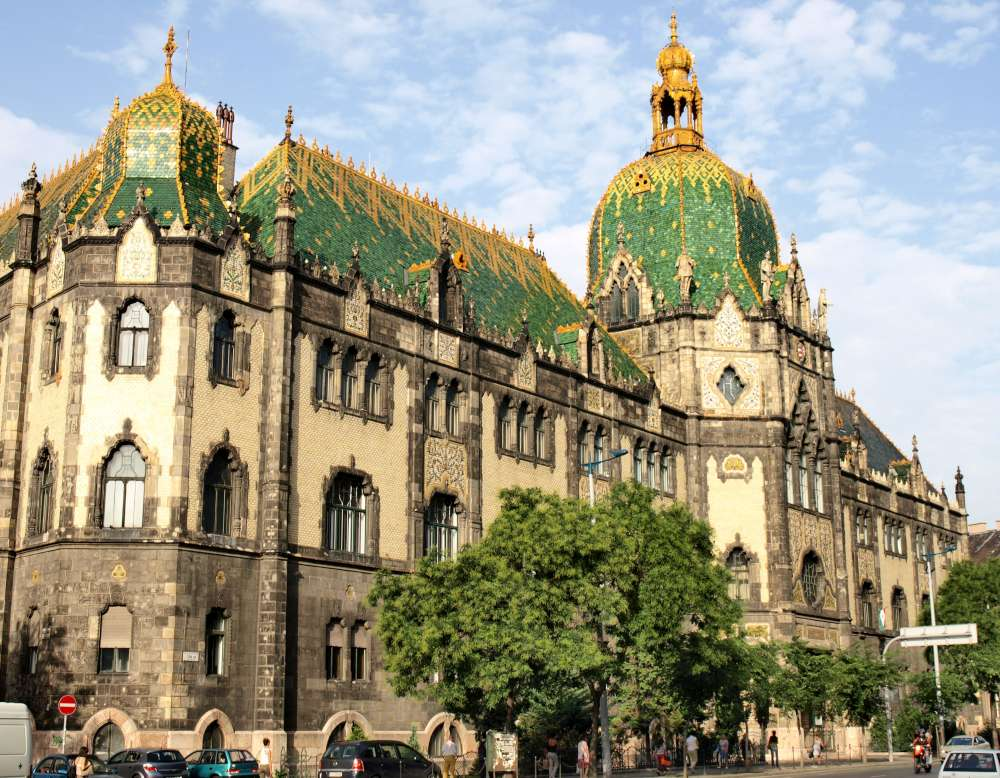
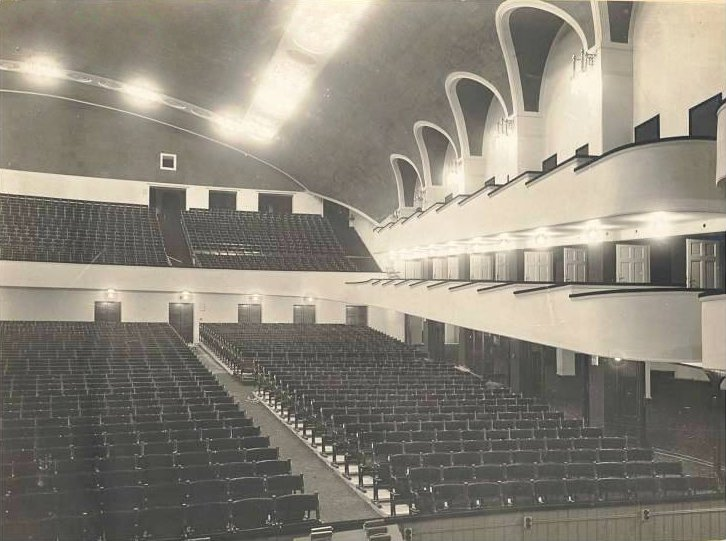
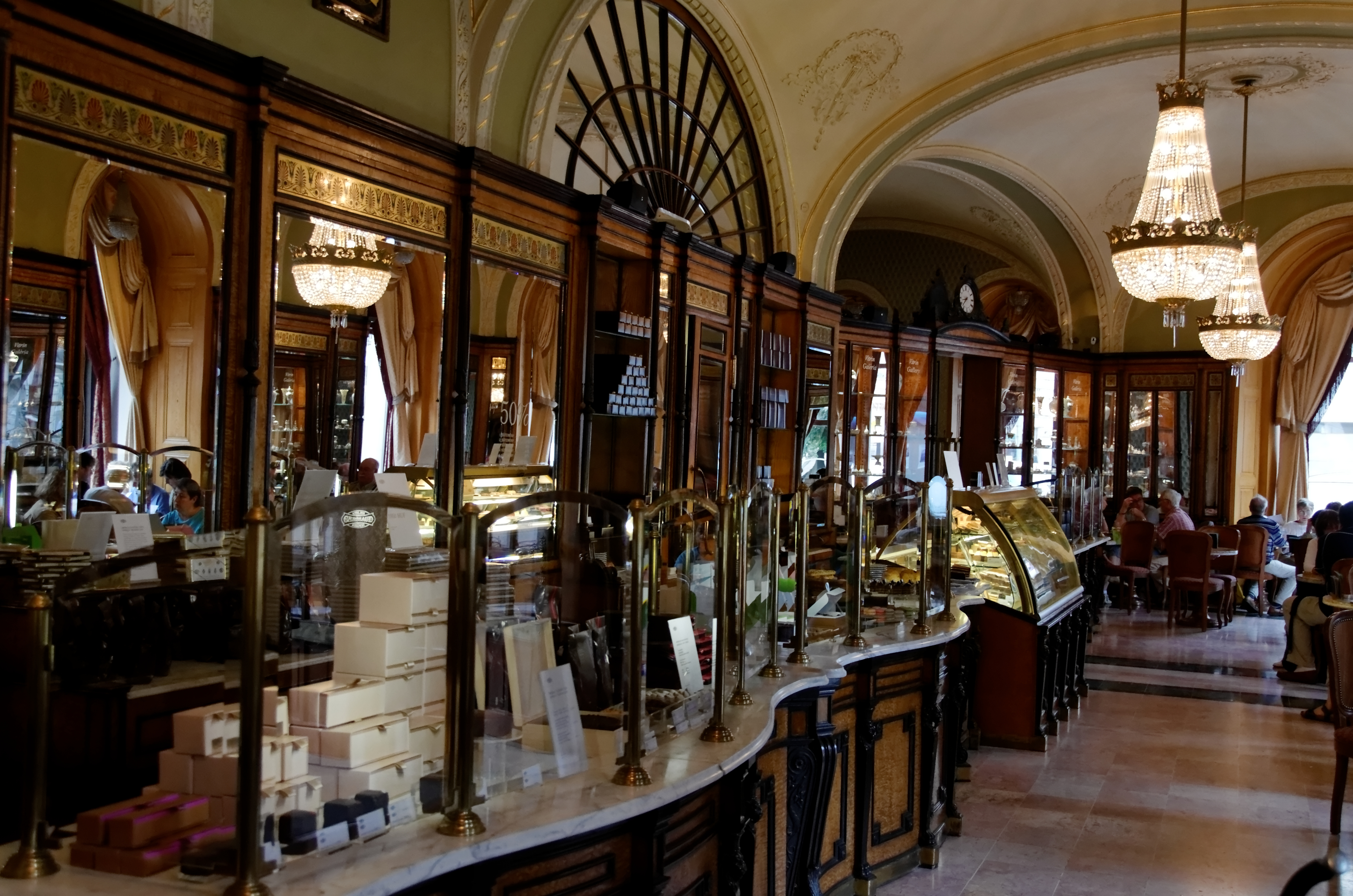
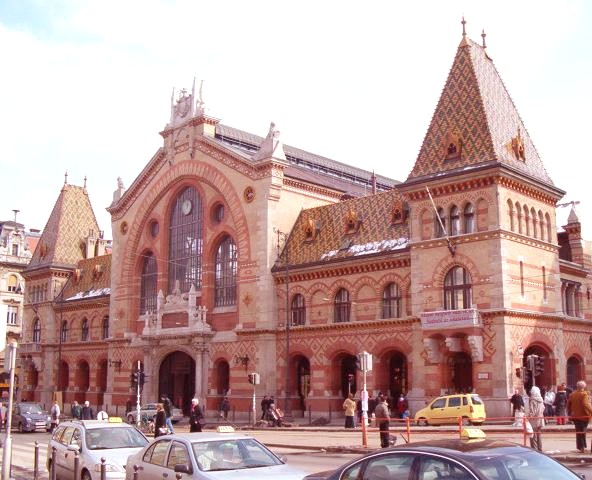
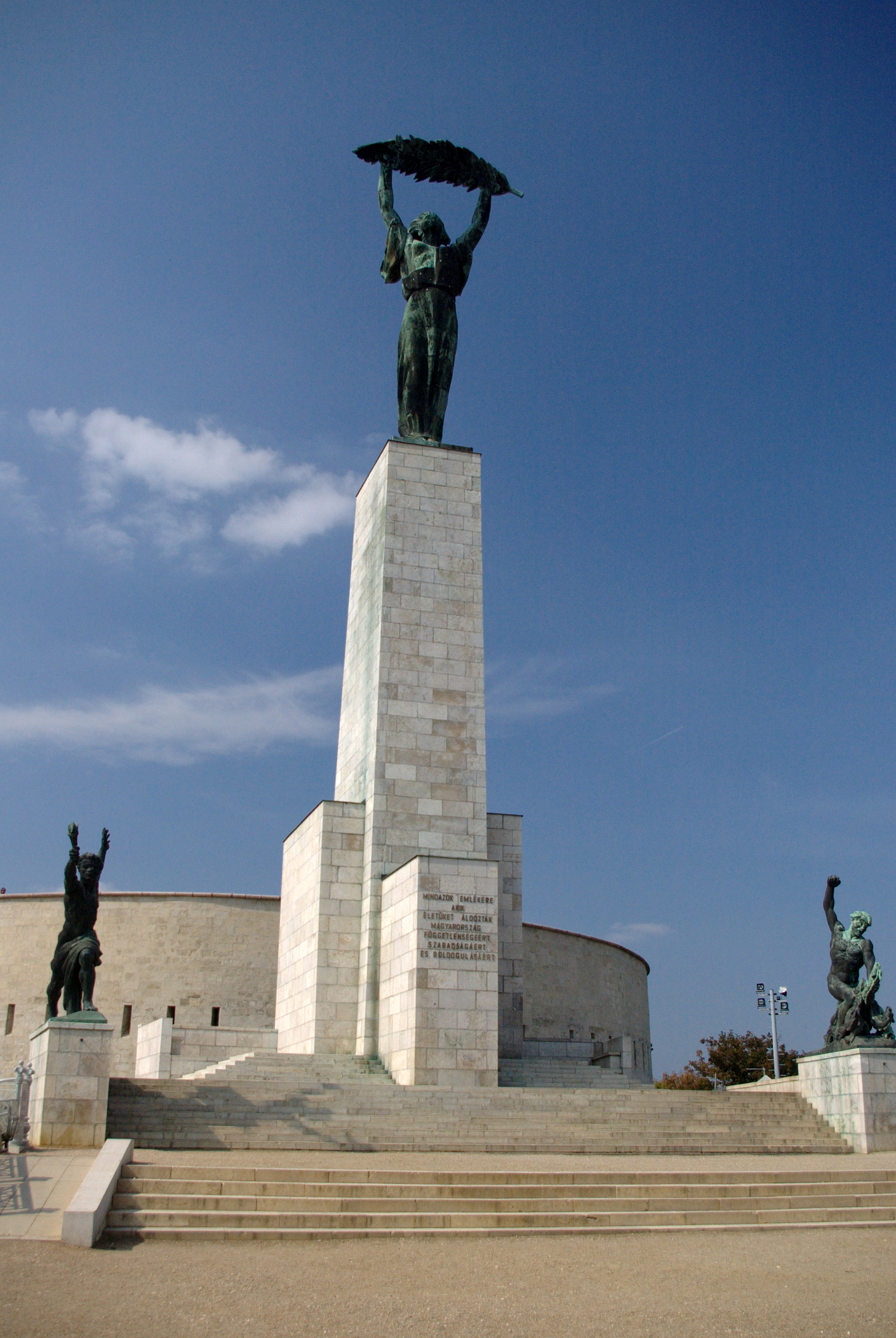
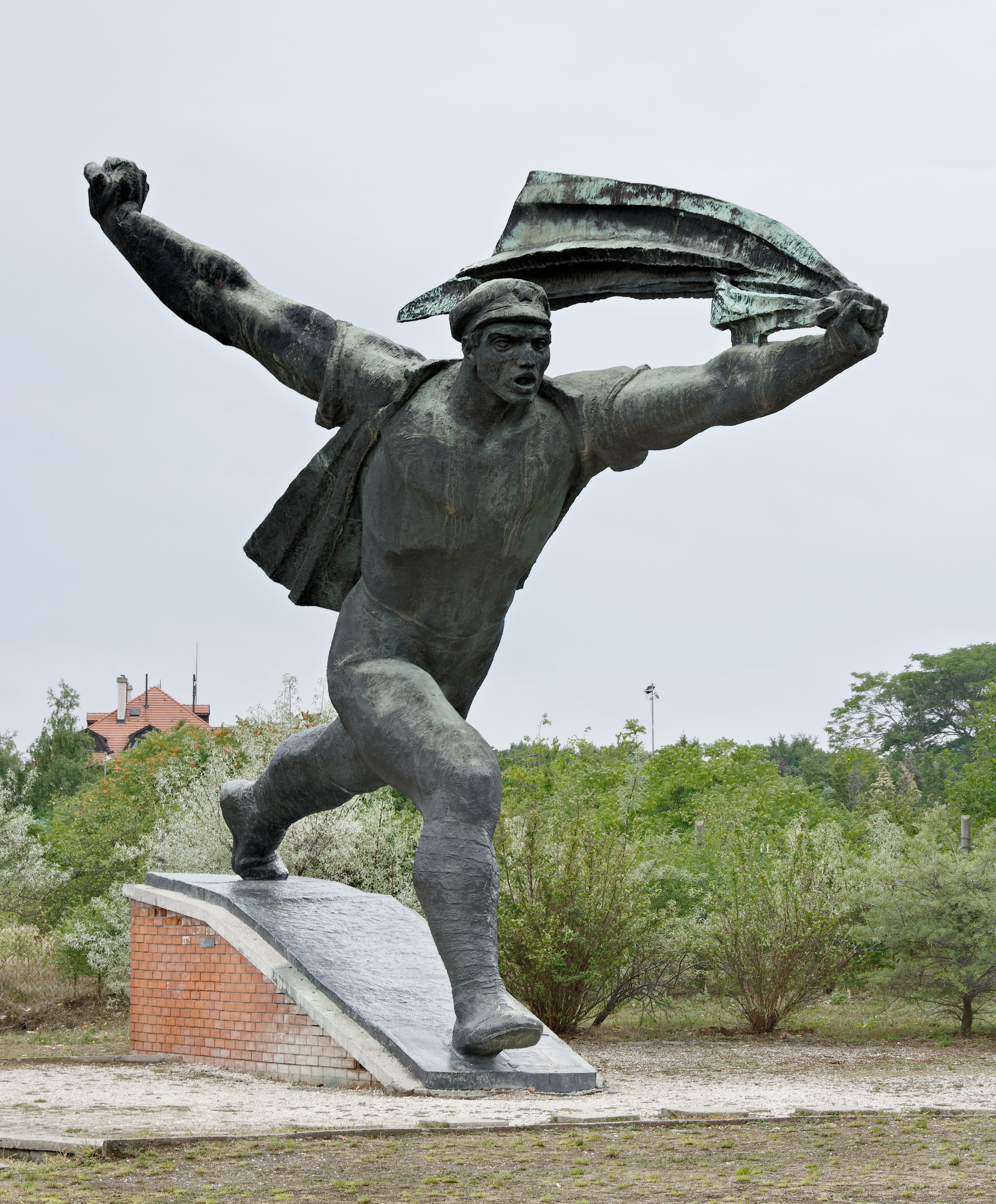
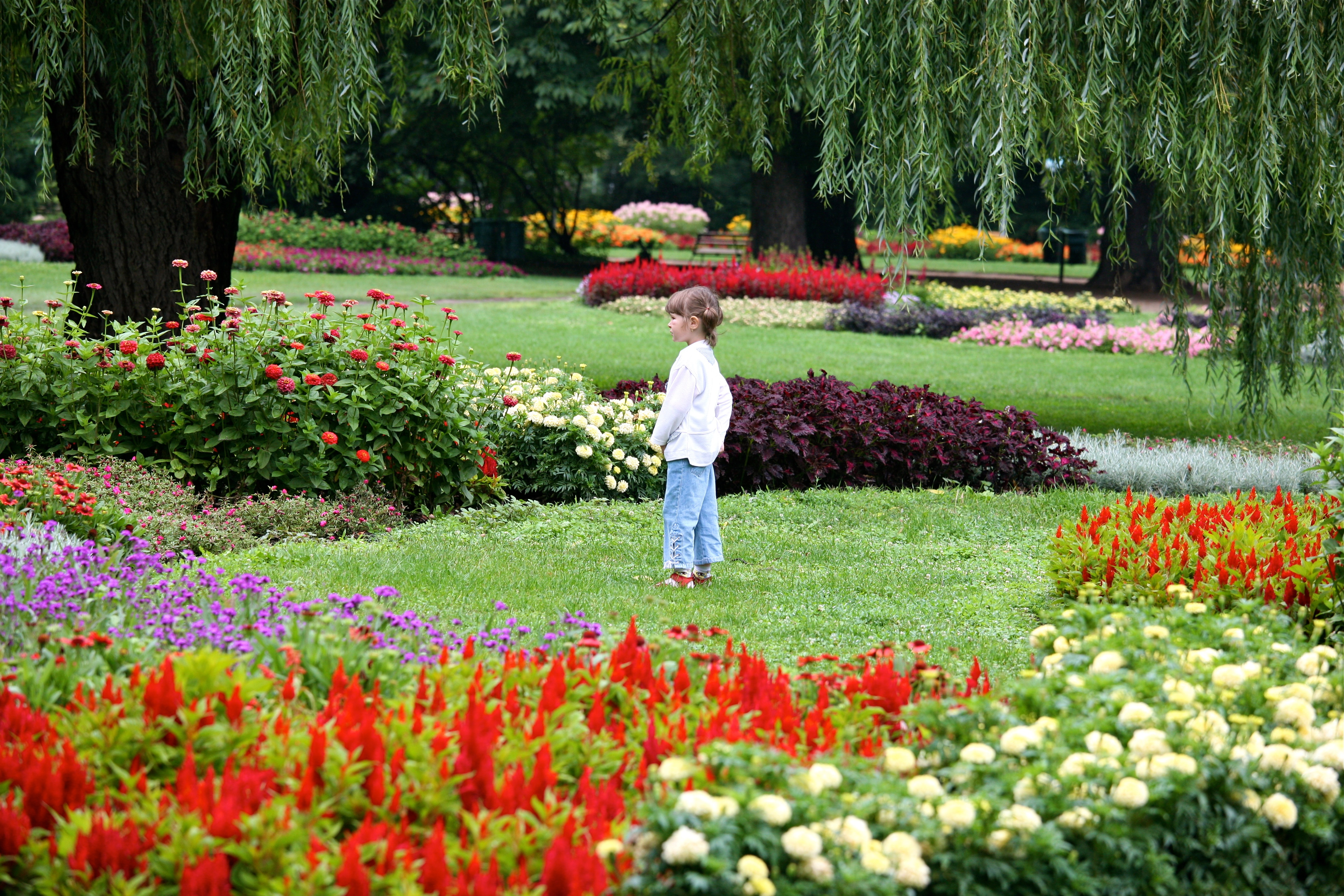
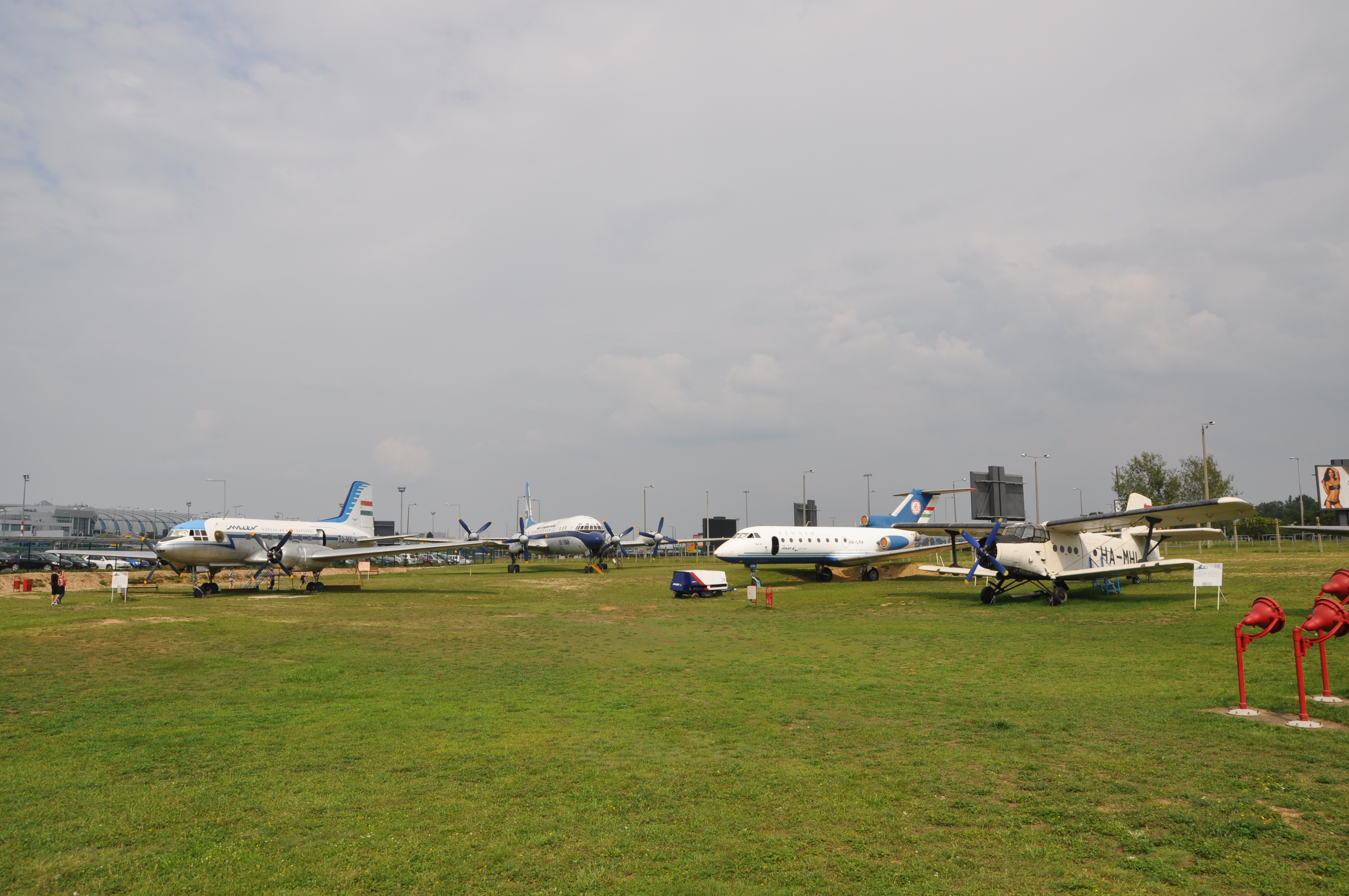
Picture	Sight name	District	Built	Information
	Parliament	V	1885 - 1904
	St. Stephen's Basilica	V	1851 – 1906
	Hungarian National Museum	VIII	1837 – 1847
	National Theatre	IX	2002
	Buda Castle	I
	Hungarian National Gallery	I
	Matthias Church	I	1015
	Fisherman's Bastion	I	1899 – 1902
	Castle Hill Funicular	I	1868 - 1870
	Sándor Palace	I	1803 – 1805
	Aquincum Military Amphitheatre	III	AD 89
	Hungarian Academy of Sciences	V	1862 - 1865
	Shoes on the Danube Bank memorial	V	2005
	Gresham Palace	V	1907
	Tomb of Gül Baba	II	1543 - 1548
	Andrássy Avenue	VI	18th century
	Hungarian State Opera House	VI	1875 - 1884
	House of Terror Museum	VI	2002
	City Park	XIV	1811
	Heroes' Square	XIV	1896 – 1906
	City Park Lake (ice skating rink in winter)	XIV
	Vajdahunyad Castle	XIV	1904 – 1908
	Museum of Fine Arts	XIV	1906
	Zoo	XIV	1865 - 1866
	Széchenyi Medicinal Bath	XIV	1909 - 1913
	Dohány Street Synagogue	VII	1854 - 1859
	Rumbach Street Synagogue	VII	1869 - 1872
	Museum of Applied Arts	IX	1897
	Erkel Theatre	VIII	1911
	Café Gerbeaud	V	1897
	Great Market Hall	IX	1897
	Liberty Statue	XI	1947
	Memento Park	XXII	1993
	Margaret Island	none
	Aeropark	XVIII

== Sights by districts ==
District	Sights
I. Várkerület	Buda Castle, Matthias Church, Hungarian National Gallery, Castle Hill Funicular, Sándor Palace, Fisherman's Bastion, Gellért Hill, Labyrinth of Buda Castle, Vienna Gate
II.	Tomb of Gül Baba, Mechwart Park, Cave of Szemlő Hill, Stalactite Cave of Pál Valley, Lukács Bath
III. Óbuda-Békásmegyer	Aquincum Military Amphitheatre, Zichy Castle
IV. Újpest	Queen of Heavens Church, Synagogue of Újpest, Water Tower of Újpest
V. Belváros-Lipótváros	Parliament, Hungarian Academy of Sciences, Gresham Palace, St. Stephen's Basilica, Vigadó Concert Hall, Ethnographic Museum, Hungarian National Bank, Shoes on the Danube Bank memorial, Károlyi Garden
VI. Terézváros	Andrássy Avenue, Hungarian State Opera House, House of Terror Museum, St. Theresa of Ávila Church.
VII. Erzsébetváros	Dohány Street Synagogue, Rumbach Street Synagogue, Kazinczy Street Synagogue, St. Elizabeth of Árpád House Church, Reformed Church of Fasor, Madách Theatre, Gozsdu udvar, Franz Liszt Academy of Music, Hungária Bath (today: Continental Hotel Zara), New York Palace (today: Boscolo Budapest Hotel)
VIII. Józsefváros	Hungarian National Museum, Erkel Theatre, Orczy Garden, Botanic Garden, Hungarian Natural History Museum, Metropolitan Ervin Szabó Library
IX. Ferencváros	National Theatre, Palace of Arts, Kálvin Square Reformed Church, Assisi St. Francis Church, Zwack Unicum Museum, Ráday Street, Holocaust Memorial Center, Museum of Applied Arts, Central Market Hall
X. Kőbánya	Népliget (People's Park), Planetarium, St. László Church, Csősztorony (Keeper Tower)
XI. Újbuda	Gellért Hill, Citadella, Liberty Statue, Budapest University of Technology and Economics St. Gellért Church, Kopaszi Dike
XII. Hegyvidék	Elizabeth Lookout Tower, Normafa
XIII.	Comedy Theatre, St. Margaret of Árpád House Church, Our Lady of Mount Carmel Church
XIV. Zugló	City Park, Heroes' Square, Zoo, Széchenyi Medicinal Bath, Gundel Restaurant, Vajdahunyad Castle, Petőfi Hall, Museum of Fine Arts, Hall of Art, Transport Museum, Municipal Grand Circus, Petőfi Hall, Ferenc Puskás Stadium
XV.	Water Tower
XVI.	Mátyásföld Airport,
XVII. Rákosmente	Statue of Heroes, Statue of Pope John Paul II, Rákos Stream, Merzse Marsh
XVIII. Pestszentlőrinc-Pestszentimre	Ferenc Liszt Airport, Sándor Petőfi Statue, Aeropark
XIX. Kispest	Our Lady Church of Kispest
XX. Pesterzsébet	St. Elizabeth of Árpád House Church, Statue of Lajos Kossuth
XXI. Csepel	Little Our Lady Church, Tamariska Hill
XXII. Budafok-Tétény	Czuba-Durozier Castle, Nagytétény Castle, Sacelláry Castle, Törley Castle, Törley Mausoleum, Memento Park
XXIII. Soroksár	Heroes' Statue, Molnár Island
Margaret Island	Dominicans' Monastery ruins, Francisian Monastery ruins, Premontrean Convent, Water Tower, Japanese Garden, Alfréd Hajós National Swimming Stadium, Palatinus Swimming Pool, Musical Fountain
