= Zuzu-Vető =

Artist duo

Zuzu-Vető are two artists composed of Lóránt Méhes Zuzu and János Vető NahTe, who work together as a collaborative art duo.

They are the initiators of the "postmodern social-impressionist neobarbar" style. Their painting and installations were of great significance for the contemporary Hungarian art scene. From 1981 to 1986, they participated in many shows in their native Hungary and abroad.

== Work ==
Lóránt Méhes Zuzu, and János Vető NahTe, started working together during a New Year's Eve party in 1980, where they collaboratively drew a series titled Más (Different) on A-4 paper with felt-tip pens.

Their first performance art took place in an apartment in 1981, with the pair wearing cardboard boxes on their heads and miming in front of a painted set. Their performance was recorded on video and photographed. The photographs were then painted over and turned into a work titled Neutrin-ócska. A prop in the performance – a painted square shaped wheel called the "squared wheel of socialism" – became a symbol and leitmotif in their work.

Their first show (Bam, bam, bam a little softer / All this fake snow for nothing ) took place in October 1981 at Bercsényi Club, in Budapest, where they exhibited in artificial snow – felt-tip pen drawings on paper, acrylic spray painted canvases, colored and painted over photographs and sculptures made from cardboard boxes.

In October 1981, they performed at the Window Dressing and Decoration Vocational High School’s Club, spray painting in front of an audience a work titled Color TV Twist, for which they won a prize from The Young Artist’s Studio (Live Painting Action). They did a similar public performance artwork at Glasgow’s Third Eye Center New Art Gallery in 1985.

During the same month, they had a second show at Bercsényi Club, titled New Tractor-factory office (Impossible pictures, in impossible places) in which they displayed their work on radiators, on doors, and on the floor. Their work TV news carpet, composed of felt tipped pen drawings and text based on television news, was censored by the arts committee jury responsible for the exhibition.

Their next show Tibetan Fall Camping at the Young Artist’s Club, opened in November 1981. They built tents out of radiators, barbed wire, black and white plastic foil. During their opening performance, they improvised on duck whistles and cymbals, lying down and wearing cardboard boxes on their heads. They displayed their artwork on the club’s old news bulletins, littered the camp with materials such as blue vitriol, sulfur, gasoline, magnesium, hypodermic needles. They made their first flag: triangular shaped pieces of cardboard displaying the plan of the exhibition, mounted on a broomstick fixed into a Christmas tree stand enveloped with barbed wire. The use of new and found objects – refrigerator, vacuum cleaner, barbed wire, globe, thumb tacks, transistor, electric fan, Christmas lights, candy pocket knife, axe, hair comb – became typical for their exhibitions, so was the use flags (ex. New Flags, New Winds exhibition at the Young Artists’ Studio in Budapest, in 1983).

From 1982 onwards, their artwork and installations became more colorful and decorative. On top of acrylic paint on canvas and they glued, or stitched pearls and objects such as a folding ruler, colored shiny paper (ex. Grandfather, Grandmother, Piroska, Zuzu-Vető double portrait), or embroidered the frame of the painting (ex. Open this way ). They decorated their installations with blue vitriol, baby powder, pearls, powdered pigment (ex. Cellar statue exhibit, Skin and Bone, Tulip Carpet, Seismograph exhibitions)

From 1983, their sculptures out of pebble, bone, transistor, feather, wire, pearl, or chicken bone (Űrkőkorszaki szoborportrék /Cellar Statue portraits from the Space-Stone Age) became regular components of their installations (ex. Skin and Bone, Picnic on Mars exhibitions).

Both artists worked independently as well, integrating their work in collaborative installations, from 1984 on. Vető’s color painted black and white photographs, and Zuzu’s small statuettes (votive figures) or colored pencil mandalas were part of collaborative artworks (Flags, obo obosutras, Himalaja taxi exhibitions ).

Socialist symbols (red star, hammer, sickle, factory, housing project, tractor, Trabant) were paired with other symbols (heart, skull, bone, tulip, Eiffel Tower, pyramid, Statue of Liberty, genitalia, musical instruments). The images were narrative, the symbols were to be read together. They described actual events, or dreams, aiming to influence the future in a positive direction with magical thinking. They considered their major influence the works of Tamás Szentjóby, János Baksa-Soós and Tibor Hajas. In 1983, they discovered the works of Milarepa, an 11th century Tibetan saint whose work had great impact on them.

In 1984, Lóránt Zuzu Méhes’ personal experience led him towards spirituality, and János Vető NahTe turned towards music (Trabant, Balaton, Európa Kiadó musical groups). Their last installation was in 1986, at the Saint Stephen King Museum of Székesfehérvár.

They started working together again regularly after 2002 and continue to exhibit and sign collaborative artwork together.

== Selected solo exhibitions ==
2014 • Méhes Lóránt Zuzu retrospective, Kiskunfélegyháza, Culture house

2013 • We’re reborn – New works, Zuzu-Vető exhibition, Neon Gallery, Budapest

2007 • Méhes Lóránt Zuzu retrospective, Ernst Museum, Budapest • Mari and Évike, Zuzu- Vető exhibition, Memoart, Budapest

2006 • Zuzu-Vető exhibition, Kis Terem, Budapest

1985 • Post-traditionelle Kunst, Mana Galerie, Vienna

1984 • Tulip carpet, Lágymányos Community house, Budapest • Flags, Obo, Obosutras, Studio Gallery, Budapest • Gud and Grammatic, (in collaboration with: János Szirtes) Charlottenburg, Copenhagen

1983 • New flags, new winds, Young Student’s Club, Budapest • The first three rocks, Youth Club, Székesfehérvár

1982 • Cellar statue exhibition, Vajda Lajos Studio, Szentendre • This day is beautiful, Rabinext artist studio, Budapest

1981• Bam-Bam, a little softer, (All this fake snow for nothing), Bercsényi Club, Budapest • New Tractor-factory office (Impossible pictures, in impossible places), Bercsényi Club, Budapest • Tibetan Fall Camping, Young Student’s Club, Budapest

== Selected group exhibitions ==
2019 • Epoch treasures, Danube Museum, Esztergom

1986 • In parentheses, Csók István Képtár, Székesfehérvár • Rajz/Drawing ’86, Pécsi Galéria, Pécs • Aspekte ungarischer Maierei der Gegenwart, Leverkusen, Halle, Münster

1985 • 101 Objects, Óbuda Gallery, Budapest • XI. Prezentacja Malarzy Krajów Socjalistycznych, Szczecin • Hungarian Arts in Glasgow – Eighteen Artists, Glasgow Art Center, Glasgow • Tropic of Cancer, Ernst Museum, Budapest • Drei Generationen ungarischer Künstler, Neue Galerie am Landesmuseum Graz • Snapshot, Kunsthalle, Budapest • Picnic on Mars, Csók István Képtár, Székesfehérvár • Unkarin Maalaustaidetta 1945-85, Kaupungin talon Ala-Aula Helsinki

1984 • Stúdió ’83, Havanna • Young Hungarian Artists, Galerie Szajna, Warsaw • Grenzzeichen ’84, Landesgalerie im Schloss Esterházy, Eisenstadt • Image ’84 III., Fészek Gallery, Budapest • Plánum ’84, Almássy téri Szabadidő Központ, Budapest • KB 50515253 CCA, Pécsi Galéria Pincéje, Pécs • Freshly Painted, Ernst Museum, Budapest • Rajz/Drawing ’84, Pécsi Galéria, Pécs és Budapest Gallery, Budapest

1983 • Dream beautiful pictures, Budapest Gallery, Budapest • Rabinext Műterem, Budapest • Skin and Bone, Vajda Lajos Stúdió, Szentendre • Stúdió ’83, Ernst Museum, Budapest

1982 • Stúdió ’82, Kunsthalle, Budapest

== Sources ==
- Gyetvai, Ágnes: Új hullám – új traktor / 1981. Artpool.
- Simon, Zsuzsa: Zuzu más, Jánoska más. Mozgó Világ, 1982/6, 26-28.
- Beke, László: Tíz kortárs magyar képzőművészeti kiállítás, 1982 második feléből. Művészettörténeti Értesítő, 1982/4, 323-327.
- Galántai György beszélgetése Beke Lászlóval a Vető–Zuzu kiállítás kapcsán. Artpool Levél,1983/2.
- Galántai György beszélgetése Vető Jánossal. Artpool Levél,1983/2.
- Röpkeség, Baksa-Soós Jánossal beszélget Vető János, Kecskés Kriszta, Méhes Lóránt és Kozma György. Artpool Levél,1983/3.
- Gyetvai, Ágnes: Birkás Á., Károlyi Zs., Kelemen K., Méhes L. és Vető J. közös műterem kiállítása,1983 ápr. 19. (RABINEXT Stúdió). Artpool Levél,1983/4.
- Kistamás, László: „Ölj meg ma is pár órára”. Artpool Levél,1983/4.
- Kozma, György: Pinceszobortárlat. Cápa (Bölcsész Index), 1983. 68-71.
- Szőke, Annamária: Vető-Méhes riport. Cápa (Bölcsész Index), 1983. 73-94.
- Gyetvai, Ágnes: Fix-Pax - Tartós Béke. (Bölcsész Index/Jó Világ),1984. 43-46.
- dr. P. Horváth: Méhes Lóránt és Vető János kiállítása a Stúdió Galériában. Artpool Levél. 1984/1.
- Hegyi, Lóránd: Picture 84, Exhibitions in the Fészek Gallery, New Hungarian Quarterly No.96., 1984. 177-179.
- Perneczky, Géza: The Emergence of Painting in Hungary, New Hungarian Quarterly, No. 96., 1984 171-176.
- Forián Szabó, Noémi: Nyugi, nyugi a szociálimpesszionista neobarbár kerék forog. iArtmagazin 2006/6.
- Forián Szabó, Noémi: Méhes Lóránt Zuzu retrospektív kiállítása az Ernst Múzeumban, 2007/ Lóránt Méhes Zuzu - A Retrospective Exhibition, 2007. (English text adapted from the Hungarian by Philip Barker) Kunsthalle, Budapest, official website.
- Simon, Zsuzsa: Méhes Lóránt Zuzu a festő. Balkon, 2008/6. 10-21.
- Kürti, Emese: Zuzu-Vető: Feltámadtunk - új képek. Magyar narancs 2013/11.
