= Robert Capa Contemporary Photography Center =

Photography center in Budapest

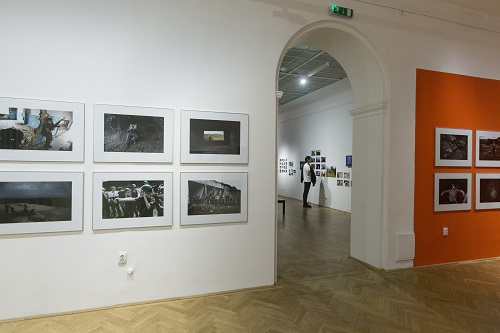
- Interior of the Capa Center
- Established: 2013
- Location: Budapest, Hungary
- Coordinates: 47.5022°N 19.0611°E
- Type: photography museum
- Website: capacenter.hu

The Robert Capa Contemporary Photography Center is a visual arts institute and exhibition space in Budapest, Hungary. The Center organises national and international photography exhibitions and workshops, and awards the annual Robert Capa Photography Grand Prize for Hungarian photographers. It was named after the Hungarian-American photographer, Robert Capa, and opened in 2013, on the centennial anniversary of his birth.

== Collection and exhibitions ==
The Center's collection consists of more than 900 prints of Capa's photographs and 48 vintage prints, spanning his entire career. The prints were selected from the negatives by his brother, Cornell Capa, and the author Richard Whelan. Three sets were made; the others are housed at the International Center of Photography in New York and at the Fuji Art Museum in Hachiōji, Tokyo. The Center's permanent exhibition, Robert Capa, the Photojournalist, presents a selection of 140 prints. In 2024, some of the photographs were used in an anti-war media campaign launched by the Center and shown throughout Europe.

Temporary exhibitions hosted by the Center include Euphoria? Stories of a System Change from Hungary (2019–20), Crossing Lines. Politics of Images (2023) and Eastern European Beauty – Contemporary Fashion Photography & the Eastern European Aesthetic (2024). Its recent exhibitions have included European Kinship – Eastern European Perspective, a collaboration with the Adam Mickiewicz Institute in Warsaw, presenting works dealing with modern European identity by artists from Poland and Hungary.

== History ==
After the Hungarian State purchased Robert Capa's legacy in 2008 and brought it back to Hungary, establishing an institution dedicated to Hungarian photography became a priority. A selection of approximately 30 images from the acquired collection was first exhibited at the Hungarian National Museum from March 6 to 15, 2009. Later that year, the collection was also presented at the Ludwig Museum of Contemporary Art in Budapest.

On July 12, 2013, the Hungarian State established the Robert Capa Contemporary Photography Center and the Center was opened on December 3, 2013.

=== Building ===
The Center is in an Art Nouveau house built in 1912, designed by architect Gyula Fodor, which has a large stained glass window in the staircase made by artist Miksa Róth, based on the designs of painter József Rippl-Rónai, and stone benches designed by the architect Ödön Lechner. The building was commissioned by art collector and patron of the arts Lajos Ernst. It was the first five-story building in Budapest, and, among other functions, housed a museum exhibiting Ernst’s private collection and hosting temporary exhibitions.

After Ernst’s death in 1937, the cultural institution in the building continued to operate under frequently changing names. Later it functioned as a branch of the Kunsthalle for decades, hosting exhibitions and art events. Until August 2013, it housed the Ernst Museum.
