= Vető =

Vető is a Hungarian surname. Notable people with the surname include:

- Gábor Vető (born 1988), Hungarian boxer
- György Vető (1898–1977), Hungarian Jewish merchant and religious leader
- János Vető (born 1953), Hungarian visual artist part of Zuzu-Vető
- Lajos Vető (1904-1989), Hungarian Lutheran bishop
- Miklós Vető (1936–2020), Hungarian-born French philosopher
- Tamás Vető (born 1935), Hungarian-born Danish conductor
