= Veto (disambiguation) =

Veto is the power to stop an action

Veto may also refer to:

== Places ==
United States

- Veto, Alabama
- Veto, Mississippi
- Veto, Ohio
- Veto, West Virginia

== People ==
- Gabor Veto (born 1988), Hungarian boxer
- Vető, Hungarian surname

== Music ==
- Veto (band), a Danish rock band
- Veto (album), a 2013 extreme metal album by Heaven Shall Burn

== Other uses ==
- Veto (card game), a Polish collectible card game
- Coincidence method, in physics used to eliminate what would otherwise be false positive events
