= Trabant (disambiguation) =

The Trabant is an East German automobile.

Trabant may also refer to:

- Trabant (military), a life guard and servant of the Middle Ages and Early Modern Period
- Trabant (Icelandic band), formed 2001
- Trabant (Hungarian band), a 1980s group
- Wipeout (ride) or Trabant, an amusement ride
- Hildegard Trabant (1927–1964), victim of the Berlin Wall

== See also ==
- Trabantenstadt, German for commuter town
