= János Vető =

Hungarian visual artist (born 1953)

János Vető (born 14 December 1953) is a Hungarian visual artist, photographer, video artist, musician, songwriter, singer and composer. He has been involved with non-conformist photo art, visual art and alternative music culture since the late '60s.

== Biography ==
Vető was born in Budapest in 1953. He was a child actor at Madách Theater in Budapest. He has been active in photography, film and music since the late 1960s. In 1962 he met János Baksa Soós, singer of the band Kex. He collaborated with Kex on some of their concerts in 1969-70. He was an intern at the Hungarian News Agency (Hungarian Telegraphic Office) where he worked together with Gergely Molnár, singer of the band Spions. Vető was the photographer, assistant, cameraman, and permanent co-worker of the performance artist Tibor Hajas from 1976 until Hajas's death in 1980. In the '80s, he created paintings, sculpture and installations with the painter Lóránt Méhes Zuzu using the name Zuzu-Vető. He founded the band Trabant with Gábor Lukin and Marietta Méhes in 1981. Vető has been living in Denmark and Sweden since the early '90s. He deals with digital image making, writes lyrics and music, sings, and plays the ukulele and the kaossilator.

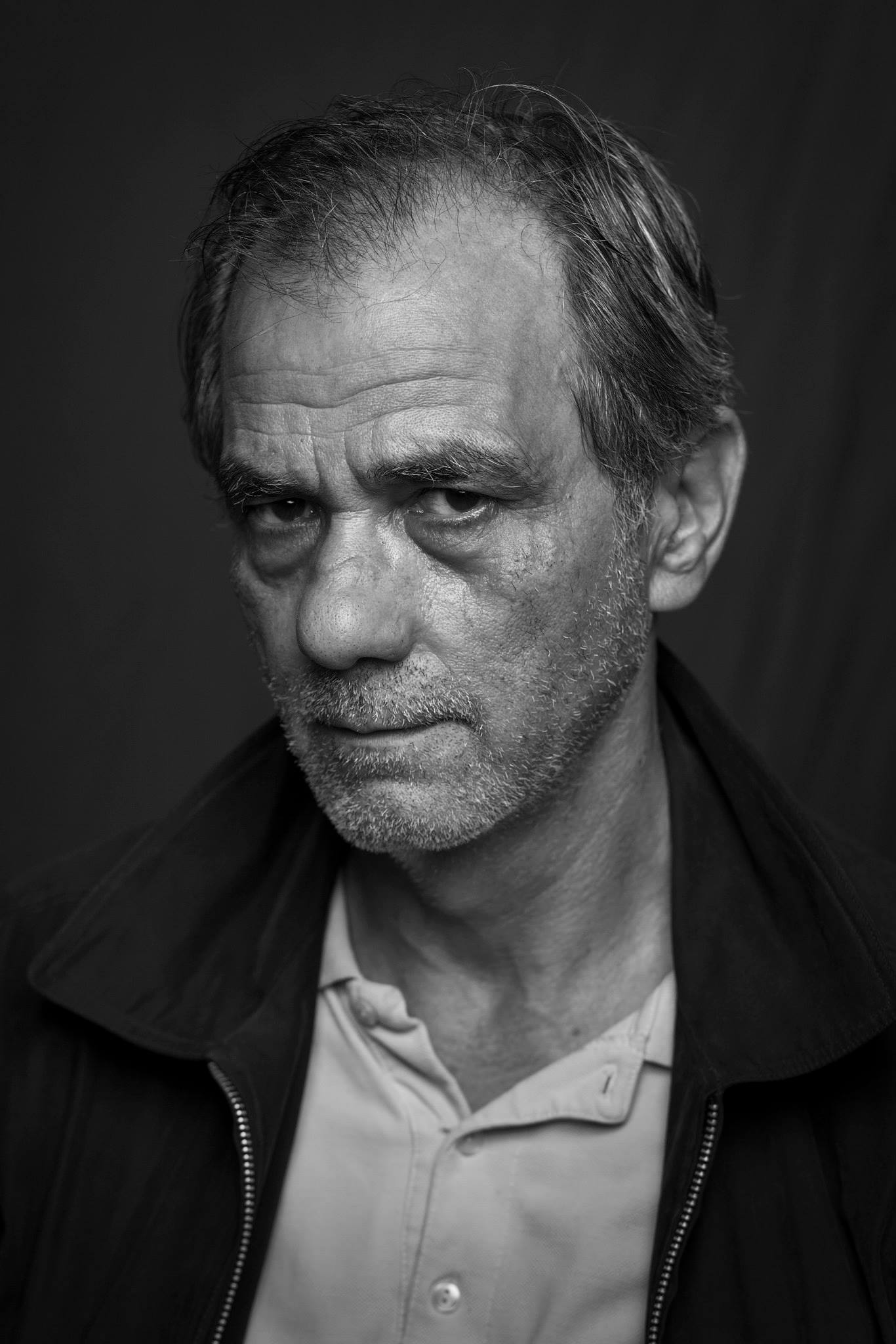

Since 1990 he is from time to time collaborating with the Swedish artist Maria Lavman Vetö. They have made several installation- and musicprojects. They are married and are living together.

== Career ==
Vető founded the Apropos Film Photo experimental film and photo studio with his friends around 1966-67 and the art action group KOMMUNART in 1972. His experimental music bands, playing intuitive music, are Kec-Mec, Apropos Filmphoto Cartoonband (Apropó Film Fotó Rajzfilmzenekar) and Hymnus. His first solo photography exhibition, Spárgatárlat, was held at Bercsényi Club in Budapest in 1974. His photographs are considered to be exceptional because of their progressivity and sensitivity.

"...his photographic work that radically challenged the conventions of portraits, self-portraits, and nudes..."

Vető collaborated with the body artist Tibor Hajas. Between 1976 and 1980, as Hajas's photographer, co-worker and friend, Vető participated in the preparation and implementation of Hajas's performances as well as in the creation of works (photo series) based on the performances which were published under both of their names. These works were featured in the Central Pavilon, Giardini at the 57th Venice Biennale at the invitation of the chief curator, Christine Macel.

Vető founded "postmodernist social-impressionist neo-barbaric" art with painter Lóránt Méhes Zuzu in 1981. They created drawings, paintings, sculpture and textile works using the name Zuzu-Vető. They applied markers, coloured pencils, brushes and spray and decorated their paintings (Two Hearts are a Couple, 1983) and textile works (Work Flag and Love Flag) with beads, feathers and various everyday objects. Stones, bones and transistors were applied on their sculptures (Űrkőkorszaki szoborportrék/Cellar Statue portraits from the Space-Stone Age), and they named their extremely colourful installations made by using blue vitriol and powder paint as "gardens" (Űrkőkorszaki pinceszoborkert/Basement Sculpture Garden from the Space-Stone Age, 1982, Szentendre, Vajda Lajos Studio). Each of their solo exhibitions is an installation that consists of their works and impromptu sculptures, their personal belongings as well as found objects (Tibeti Őszi Tábor/Tibet Autumn Camp, 1981, Budapest, Young Artists Club; Új zászlók, új szelek/New Flags, New Winds 1983, Budapest, Young Artists Club).

Vető founded the band Trabant with Gábor Lukin and Marietta Méhes in 1981, providing the script ideas and the characters for film director and screenwriter János Xantus' film Eskimo Woman Feels Cold. His other ensembles/groups: Malter és Vödör (Mortar and Bucket), Gagarin Pilótazenekar (Gagarin Pilot Band), Európa Kiadó. He founded I.M.A. (International Music Association) with Ivan E. Vincze in Copenhagen in 1998.

Since the '90s Vető has also been dealing with digital music and digital image making. He creates digital prints and videos using the name NahTe (Pixelvideos). One of his favorite materials is the bubble wrap used for packaging that he adopts as a base for paintings, sculptures, photos and videos.

In the summer of 2018 Vető created the Jó idő (Good Time) album with the members of the band Balaton.

Between 2007-2019, he created the Duo, Fluo Trio series from his digital images using the iron printing technique, the pastel and zinc painting, the scanning and the Ferrari printing.

The first two iron print paintings, IPP (Iron Print Paintings), were made in 2013, followed by a large series of paintings and several videos in 2020-2021.

He publishes his videos on his own YouTube video channel NahTe53.

== Exhibitions ==
=== Selected solo exhibitions ===
- 2025 Iron Print Paintings, Platz Galeria, Komárno
- 2024 Bercsényi 28-30 1970-2024, Móricz Zsigmond körtéri aluljáró, Budapest
- 2022 Found Images, Nemdebárka, Horány-Szigetmonostor • Domän#2 (with Dániel Erdély and Maria Lavman Vető), galeri ffrindiau, Budapest
- 2021 Domän (with Dániel Erdély and Maria Lavman Vető), Galleri Rostrum, Malmö
- 2020 Narcissus and Psyche and various new old pieces, Gallery Pegazus, Szentbékkálla
- 2020 Duo, Trio, Fluo, aqb Project Space, Budapest
- 2019 Introduction, Galleri Rostrum, Malmö
- 2018 Vintage, Bubble Wrap, Pixel, galeri ffrindiau, Budapest - Colored Old Air, Höörs Konsthall, Höör
- 2016 Vigil, acb NA, Budapest
- 2013 Witty, Budapest Gallery, Budapest RELAX (with Maria Lavman and Lotte Tauber Lassen), Malmö Nordic 2013, Malmö - We Are Resurrected (Zuzu-Vető), Neon Gallery, Budapest
- 2012 Public art, Verzó online Gallery
- 2009 Photographs 1975-1986, Vintage Gallery, Budapest
- 2008 Beautiful nothing, Me-Mo-Art, Budapest - NahTe 14 videohaiku and other electro-doodling, Pixel Gallery, Budapest - Tibor Hajas latest works in collaboration with János Vető, Vintage Gallery, Budapest
- 2007 Mari és Évike (Zuzu-Vető), Me-Mo-Art Gallery, Budapest - Zuzu-Vető works – Méhes Lóránt Zuzu retrospective, Ernst Museum, Budapest - Fotografi i fokus, ADDO, Malmö
- 2006 Zuzu-Vető, Kisterem Gallery, Budapest
- 2005 Tibor Hajas (1946-1980): Emergency Landing, Ludwig Museum, Budapest
- 2003 Colored Old Air, Hungarian House of Photography-Mai Manó House, Budapest
- 1997 In memoriam Tibor Hajas, Ernst Museum, Budapest
- 1996 Hang on Vision in collaboration with Maria Lavman Vetö, Politiken, Copenhagen - Hommage to the holy light-bulb, Articsók Gallery, Budapest
- 1995 Hommage to the holy light-bulb (with Maria Lavman Vető), Overgaden - Institute for Contemporary Art, Copenhagen - Ultimate pictures, Vizivárosi Gallery, Budapest
- 1994 Invisible Unhearable Unbelievable in collaboration with Maria Lavman Vetö, Újlak Gallery, Budapest
- 1991 Make babies not art in collaboration with Maria Lavman Vetö, Liget Gallery, Budapest
- 1989 Galerie Notuno, Geneva - Méhes Lóránt, Vető János, Gasner János, Kiss László, Margitszigeti Víztorony, (Margaret Island Water Tower) Budapest
- 1988 Liget Gallery, Budapest - Guitar lesson for Aliens, Almássy Hall, Budapest
- 1987 Photographs with artificial light, Almássy Hall, Budapest - New York-New York, Liget Gallery, Budapest - Budapest-New York, Kunstlicht Galerie, Frankfurt
- 1986 Photos, Liget Gallery, Budapest
- 1985 Post-traditionelle Kunst, (Zuzu-Vető), Galeria Mana, Vienna
- 1984 Flags, obo, obosutras, (Zuzu-Vető), Stúdió Gallery, Budapest
- 1983 New flags, New Winds, (Zuzu-Vető), Young Artists Club, Budapest - The First Three Stones, (Zuzu-Vető) Ifjúsági Ház (Youth House), Székesfehérvár
- 1982 Cellar Sculpture Garden, (Zuzu-Vető), Vajda Lajos Studio, Szentendre - It's beautiful today, (Zuzu-Vető), Rabinext Gallery, Budapest
- 1981 Tibet Autumn Camp, (Zuzu-Vető), Young Artists Club, Budapest - Zelfportret en Dialog, Galerij Micheline Swajcer, Antwerp - New Tractor Operating Agency, (Zuzu-Vető), Bercsényi Club, Budapest - Bam-Bam, Just A Little Louder, (Zuzu-Vető),1981, Bercsényi Club, Budapest
- 1979 Excavation, Bercsényi Club, Budapest
- 1977 Galerie Schweidebraden (with Gusztáv Hámos), Berlin
- 1976 Galerie Toldi, Budapest
- 1975 Young Artists Club, Budapest
- 1974 ’Spárgatárlat’, Bercsényi Club, Budapest
- 1973 Concept art (with KOMMUNART), Tomb of Gül Baba, villa Wágner, Budapest

=== Selected group exhibitions ===
- 2026 Here I Am - The Viennese Actionist And Contemporary Performative Art, Ferenczy Museum, Szentendre
- 2021 Paris Photo (acb Gallery and Einspach Fine Art & Photography Gallery), Paris
- 2020 ORD SOM BILD /BILD SOM ORD 2020 – Artists Books inspirerat av Lasse Söderbergs poesi, Galleri Rostrum, Malmö
- 2019 Epoch Treasures, Danube Museum, Esztergom
- 2018 Promote, Tolerate, Ban: Art and Culture in Cold War Hungary, Wende Museum, Culver City, California
- 2017 Viva Arte Viva (with Tibor Hajas), Central Pavilon, Giardini, 57th Venice Biennale, Venice - Summer Show, acb Gallery, Budapest - Two-way movement Focus: Hungary, viennacontemporary, Vienna - With the Eyes of Others, Elizabeth Dee Gallery, New York - Hungarian Gaze, National Museum, Warsaw
- 2016-2017 Progressive Intentions, The Hungarian Institute in Istanbul, Istanbul
- 2016 Lights of the Night. Cooperation and Interaction with Tibor Hajas, Cabaret Voltaire, Zürich - The Freedom of the Past, Mai Manó Ház, Budapest
- 2014 Waldsee 1944 and Cruel mailing – Anti-Semitic postcards 1895-1930, 2B Gallery, Budapest - Fetish, Taboo, Relic, Vajda Lajos Studio, Szentendre - 1, 2, ! ? „Itt jelentkezzen öt egyforma ember” – Concept ’palimszeszt’ or the Hungarian conteptualism, Art Gallery, Paks - Hungarian Hippies, Karton Gallery, Budapest
- 2013 The Naked Man, Ludwig Museum, Budapest
- 2010-2012 Global All Stars concerts, Islands Brygge, Copenhagen
- 2012 The Other Half of the Sky. Selection from the Ludwig Museum's Collection, Ludwig Museum, Budapest
- 2009 Karneval-Karneval, Erlangen / Berlin - Gallery Night Budapest, Mucius Gallery, Budapest - NOW, Gödör Terasz Gallery, Budapest - Kontor Orkester Rostrum, Malmö - „Brännaren 2”, Malmö - Björn Ross Micro Art Festival, Rostrum, Malmö - Berlinale special on Central European Cold War Films, Berlin
- 2008 Beautiful Nothing, MeMoArt Gallery, Budapest -14 Videohaiku and other electro-scratch, Pixel Gallery, Budapest - Karneval-Karneval, Fleet Street Theater, Hamburg - János Vető – Photographs 1975-1986, Vintage Gallery, Budapest - Neo-avantgarde tendencies, Zichy Castle, Budapest
- 2007 „Mari és Évike” (Zuzu-Vető), MeMoArt Gallery, Budapest
- 2006 Karneval-Karneval, Fleet Street Theater, Hamburg - Urban Contact Zone: Sharing Areas – Using Places, Hamburg
- 2005 What's Next? – Neighborhoods and Artistic Practices, Copenhagen - Neofoton, Szentendre - FMK – those 80s’, Kogart, Budapest
- 2001 Regard Hongrois – Hungarian Gaze, Palais Royal, Paris
- 2002 New works, Liget Gallery, Budapest
- 2000 Media Modell - Interactive technics, Kunsthalle, Budapest
- 1999 Documentum, Kunsthalle, Budapest
- 1995 Encuentro en Copenhagen – Reencuentro en Bilbao, (with Maria Lavman Vetö, Ada Ortega Camara, Peter Lind) La Brocha, Bilbao
- 1994 Group picture, Vigadó Gallery, Budapest -’80s – Fine Arts, Ernst Museum, Budapest- Variations for Pop Art, Ernst Museum, Budapest
- 1994 Panel (with Maria Lavman Vető, Lotte Tauber Lassen), Liget Gallery, Budapest
- 1993 Panel (with Maria Lavman Vető, Lotte Tauber Lassen), Fotografisk Galleri, Copenhagen
- 1993 "The Hungarian Epigon Exhibition 2", in collaboration with Maria Lavman Vetö Kampnagel, Hamburg
- 1992 "Ung Skulptur", in collaboration with Maria Lavman Vetö, Skovlunde Bypark, Köpenhamn
- 1991 "The general art-strike exhibition Perpeetum Mobile" in collaboration with Maria Lavman Vetö, Genéve, Antwerp
- 1991 Still Life (with Maria Lavman Vető and Szerencsés János) Fészek Gallery, Budapest
- 1990 TRIUMF det ubeboelige, Charlottenborg, Kobenhaven / Kunsthalle, Budapest
- 1989 Junge Ungarische Fotografen, Galerie Treptow / Galerie Pumpe, Berlin - The Metamorphic Medium : New Photography from Hungary, The Allen Memorial Museum, Oberlin, Ohio
- 1988 Zeitgenössische Ungarische Fotografie. Fotogalerie Wien, Vienna
- 1987 Ungarsk samtids forografi, Museet der Fotokunst Out of Eastern Europe: Private Photography, MIT Visual Arts Centre, Cambridge, Massachusetts
- 1986-87 Aspekte Ungarischer Malerei der Gegenwart, Erholungshaus der Bayer AG, Leverkusen / Stadhalle Hagen / Stadthaus Galerie, Münster
- 1986 1ère Biennale Internationale pour la Photographie d`Art et de Recherche, Galerie Dongue, Paris - In Quotes, Csók István Képtár, Székesfehérvár
- 1985 101 objects, Óbuda Gallery, Budapest - Unkarin maalaustaidetta 1945-1985, Kaupungin talon Ala-Aula, Helsinki - Hungarian Arts in Glasgow – Eighteen Artists, Glasgow Art Center, Glasgow - Drei Generationen Ungarischer Künstler, Neue Galerie am Landesmuseum, Graz - Caption, Kunsthalle, Budapest
- 1984 Newly painted, (Zuzu-Vető), Ernst Museum, Budapest - Plánum ’84 Art Festival, (Zuzu-Vető), Almássy Hall, Budapest - Gud & Gramatik, (Zuzu-Vető), Charlottenborg, Kobenhaven - Grenzzeichen ’84, (Zuzu-Vető), Landesgalerie im Schloss Esterházy, Eisenstadt
- 1983 "Álomi szép képek", (Zuzu-Vető), Óbuda Gallery, Budapest
- 1982 Egoland Art, Fészek Gallery, Budapest
- 1981 Tendencies 1970-1978, Óbuda Gallery, Budapest - Fact-picture – The History of Hungarian Photography 1840-1981, Kunsthalle Art und Telekomunikation, Vienna-Berlin-Budapest
- 1980 6 Hongaarse kunstenaars, Museum Hedendaagse, Antwerp
- 1979 Biennale of Sydney, The Art Gallery of New South Wales, Sydney - Works and Words, De Appel Arts Centre, Amsterdam
- 1978 Moderne Fotografie aus Ungarn, Galerie Schwaindebraden, Berlin
- 1976 Exposition, Hatvany Lajos Museum, Hatvan
- 1975 Montage, Young Artists Club, Budapest
- 1974 Comic, Young Artists Club, Budapest

== Discography ==
- Zuzu-Vető: Új zászlók, új szelek/ New Flags new Winds. in: Radio Artpool No.3, Cassette-radio, radio-work. Budapest-Vienna Concert over the Phone, 1983.
- Trabant: Eszkimó asszony fázik (Eskimo Woman Feels Cold), 1984
- Európa Kiadó: PopZENe, 1987
- Európa Kiadó: Koncert a Zichy kastélyban / Concert at Zichy Castle, 1986/1990
- Az Éjszakák Egyesült Álma / United Dream of Night's: A Hymnus én vagyok avagy az Apropó film-fotó rajzfilm zenekar igaz története, 1988
- Apropófilmfotórajzfilmzenekar: A forradalom után / After the revolution
- Mia Santa Maria (Maria Lavman Vetö) and Kina Herceg: Kézimunka / Handwork, 1990
- Mia Santa Maria (Maria Lavman Vetö) and KINA Herceg: Johnny gitár, 1991 (soundtrack for Sándor Sőth's movie)
- Mia Santa Maria (Maria Lavman Vetö) and KINA Herceg: Mosolyszünet / Smiling Pause, 1994, cassette, Bahia Music
- IPUT/NahTe: NEWNEEFLUGREEZ HYMNS, 2002
- The Intuitiv Trio: Concert, 2004
- NETRAF-music: NETRAF-titok (száj- és körömfájás). Műzene műfényben / NETRAF-secret (hoof and mouth disease) - Mock-Music in Mock-Light
- BHGIM Intuitive records
- Tapintat band: Jó idő / Good time. János Vető aKína herceg NahTe CsendVan (pronounced: XendFan) with Balaton, 2018.
- NahTe: Süss fel Nap! VillanyNahTe 2018. október /Let the sun shine! ElectricNahTe 2018 October
- trabant (release date: 7/10/2024, format: vinyl LP, edition number: 300), purgexxx

== Filmography ==
- Apropo Film Photo productions (experimental films by Dr. Putyi Horváth, Alfréd Járai, János Vető, 1967-1987) - director, cameraman, actor
- Öndivatbemutató (short film by Tibor Hajas, 1976) - cameraman
- Az éjszaka ékszere (video by Tibor Hajas, 1976) - cameraman
- Vendég (video of Tibor Hajas, 1976) - cameraman
- Női kezekben (short film by János Xantus, 1981) - actor
- Trabantománia (BBS short film by János Vető, 1982) - director, cameraman
- Anna Müller (short film by István Antal, 1982) - actor
- Eszkimó asszony fázik (feature film by János Xantus, 1983) - actor, lyricist
- Ex-kódex (feature film by Péter Müller Sziámi, 1983) - actor
- A szobáról (experimental film by János Vető, 1984) - director, cameraman
- Spirál (experimental film by János Vető, 1984) - director, cameraman
- A fekete macska (experimental film by István Antal, 1987) - composer
- Forradalom után (feature film by András Szirtes, 1990) - composer
- Johnny Gitár (feature film by Sándor Sőth, 1991) - screenwriter, protagonist, composer
- Blue Box (feature film by Elemér Káldor, 1992) - actor
- Elszállt egy hajó a szélben I-II. - KEX (documentary film by András Kisfaludy, 1998) - character

== Books ==
- NahTe (János Vető, Prince Kína): ColourOld Air. NahTe presents the Photographic Works of János Vető and Prince Kína on Digital Prints + a Few Original Silver Gelatins. A catalogue and CD-ROM that accompanied an exhibition held in Hungarian House of Photography (Mai Manó House) Budapest between 24 May and 8 July 2003. Hungarian House of Photography-Institute of Art History, Hungarian Academy of Sciences. ISBN 963-210-378-5 (in Hungarian and English)
- Image whipping. Tibor Hajas' (1946-1980) photo works with János Vető / Képkorbácsolás. Hajas Tibor (1946-1980) Vető Jánossal készített fotómunkái. Ed: László Beke, Transl.: Csaba Kozák; MTA Művészettörténeti Kutatóintézet Bp., 2004 ISBN 963-738-179-1 (in Hungarian, in English)
- Géza Bereményi – János Vető : Antoine és Désiré. Fényképregény az 1970-es évekből; photo: János Vető; Corvina, Bp., 2017. Antoine and Désire. Photoromance from '70. ISBN 9789631364705 (in Hungarian)

== Writings ==
- János Vető: A fény éjszakái (Hajas Tiborról)/ Nights of Light (About Tibor Hajas); in: Orpheus, 1999/21.
- János NahTe Vető (Vető Kína Herceg): Photoessay, 1999
- NahTe: PHOTOGRAPHY: The Art of Astonishment, 2003
- NahTe: Neon mese / Neon tale, 2013
- János Vető NahTe: IPP, 2025, Platz Galéria, Komárno (exhibition catalogue)

== Awards ==
- 2010 Munkácsy Award
- 2009 Major János Award NEWNEEFLUGREEZ Jesus Christ Award
- 1987 Derkovits Gyula Award (with Méhes Lóránt)

== Sources ==
- Sándor Szilágyi: Neo-Avant-Garde Trends in Hungarian Art Photography 1965-1984. Art+Text, Budapest, 2017
- Paula Ely: János Vető Nahte. Photoculture 1 August 2018
- Tibor Hajas: Töredékek az „új fotóról”-ról. Mozgó Világ. 1977
- Emese Kürti: János Vető: Vigil, acb NA, Budapest, 2016
- Noémi Forián Szabó: Nyugi, nyugi a szociálimpesszionista neobarbár kerék forog. in: Artmagazin 2006/6.
- „NahTe videohaikui és elektrofirkái” – Vető János videóinak kiállítása. est.hu, 2008
- Kata Balázs: Színezett régi levegõ. NahTe bemutatja Vetõ János és KINAherceg fényképmunkáit in: Balkon 2003/6-7.
- Carolina Söderholm: En ungersk bubblare. János Vető aka NahTe: Colored old air, Höörs konsthall, t o m 18/11. Sydsvenskan 10 November 2018
- Galántai György beszélgetése Beke Lászlóval a Vető–Zuzu kiállítás kapcsán. in: Artpool Letters, 1983/2. (February)
- Endre Rózsa T.: Vető János. Egy elsüllyedt kontinens túlélője; in: Fotóművészet, 2015/3.
- Noémi Forián Szabó: Vető János NahTe: Duo-Trio-Fluo. in: Balkon.art 2020/2.
- Michael Diemar: The Hungarian Neo-Avante-Garde. in: The Classic 2021/5.
- Vera A Fehér: „Szerintem a digitális fénykép egyedül képernyőn életképes…” – beszélgetés Vető Jánossal. in: PUNKT 2021/05!11.
- Noémi Forián Szabó: Vető János: Iron Print Paintings. in: Artmagazin 2021/9.
- Carolina Söderholm: Hä är konsten du inte ska missa. Carolina Söderholm guidar till utställningar värda ett besök. Sydsvenskan 25 September 2021
- Noémi Forián Szabó: Domain. An interview with Dániel Erdély, Maria Lavman Vető and János Vető. Újművészet / Art today, 02 February, 2023.
- Tibor Legát: Bercsényi lemegy az aluljáróba. in: énbudapestem 2024. ápr. 27
