= Lajos Kolozsváry =

Hungarian painter

- Born: Lajos Kolozsváry; 1871
- Died: 1937 (aged 65–66)

Lajos Kolozsváry (1871–1937) was a Hungarian Painter whose works were exhibited in the Műcsarnok (Art Gallery).
