= Lóránt Méhes Zuzu =

Hungarian painter (b. 1951)

Lóránt Méhes (born 5 January 1951, Szabadszállás) is a Hungarian visual artist and painter. He has been involved with non-conformist visual art and alternative culture since the early '70s.

== Career ==
"Lóránt Zuzu Méhes was born in 1951 in the small town of Szabadszállás, which can be found in Bács-Kiskun County, Hungary, 80 kilometres south of Budapest by rail. He grew up in the nearby town of Kiskunfélegyháza, where his elementary school teacher encouraged him to take up art. In his early teens he moved to Budapest to enroll at the Török Pál Technical College for Fine and Applied Arts, where he was to study for the next five years. His young teacher, Ákos Birkás, remembers that "Zuzu" was a magnetic personality, free-spirited, and headstrong, "just like Jim Morrison". Whilst at college, Zuzu made a number of friends who were to play an important role in his life, including the highly-regarded film director Gábor Bódy. It was through Bódy that he was introduced to the avant-garde art scene of Budapest in the late 60s. He befriended the painter and graphic artist László Méhes in 1971, and painted two black and white photorealist works inspired by an art album that introduced American Photorealism. Following this he created a number of portraits, including a painting of his own identity card.

Before attending the Hungarian Academy of Fine Arts he was conscripted to the army, where he met his wife-to-be Marietta. When released, he studied art restoration at the Academy, and produced photorealist pictures for his exams. After two years he took a year off, and when he returned he switched to study graphic art. His years studying graphic art are best characterized by a plan for a billboard advertisement entitled Energiatakarékossági plakátterv [Billboard Advertisement for Saving Energy]. The work depicts the element inside a light bulb as a burning 100 forint note. Zuzu also participated in the Rózsa presszó [Rose Presso] action art group, and in 1976 he created Fáklya [Torch], along with the artist András Koncz. Both men dipped their hands in petrol, and set fire to them, posing as models for each other's camera.

== The "Zuzu-Vetõ Era" ==
Zuzu befriended János Vetõ in the early 1970s. Vetõ was an experimental artist, photographer, poet, and lyricist, and worked for a number of well-known contemporary Hungarian bands. In 1980, on New Year's Eve, the two began drawing together on A4 paper with a felt tip pen. This led to a series of now-lost drawings entitled Más [Different]. They performed their first piece of collaborative action art in 1981, which was videoed by their friend Szabolcs Szilágyi. The search is still underway for a copy of that video. However, the work Neutrin-ócska [roughly "Neutrin-orrible"], which consists of a number of photos that have been painted on, also documents this work. The two artists mime an event before a pre-produced background with masks and boxes on their heads. They stuck a painted circle with "corners" cut out of paper on the background. This was to become a recurring motif in later works. Zuzu and Vetõ often based their concepts on witticisms, associations, and conversations, but the works themselves were realized without communication or restriction. "I drew a line, János finished it", as Zuzu said, and of course, the opposite was also true. They mixed Socialist symbols with those of ancient or religious cultures, used objects to create their own symbols, and used words in an emblematic way (e.g. "red star", "sickle", "hammer", "factory", "tractor", "heart", "skull", "bone", "magnet", "antenna", "rocket", "spaceship", "man", "woman", "school", "pyramid", and "altar"). The pair worked together until 1986, using the names Zuzu-Vetõ, Zuzu-Ska and ZuzuKína at both national and international exhibitions in Austria, Germany, Great Britain, Poland, Finland, Denmark, and Cuba.

== "Mystical" Pictures ==
Az isteni szeretet oltára [The Altar of Devotion to God] is a work that was created following a visual phenomenon experienced during a house party in 1984, and expresses the search for God. The wings of the gilded altar consist of twelve colour pencil drawings in golden frames which represent "mandalas". The drawings were created over a period of seven years as works of meditation. We may see "objects of worship" lined up on the altar's shelves, including a "peace pipe"; the work represents a hierarchy of religious conviction which was developed during a period studying Krishna consciousness, Tibetan Buddhism, and the esoteric and mystical doctrines of Catholicism. Other types of mystical imagery include "visions", represented in a realistic, almost plastic way, and "concepts", which have undergone a process of abstraction to form symbols.

== "New" Pictures ==
Many of the "new" pictures are self-explanatory, and require no explanation. They often represent fashionable or well-known figures. However, the photographs used for the paintings are "transformed" during the work process; following this, they are given titles, and the frozen images that originate from the restructured painted compositions become "living icons". This does not happen due to the mere omission of particular details or the alteration of the original picture, but due to Zuzu's characteristic way of seeing, and his unique mode of expression. We see self-confident models; there are fashionably-dressed, young, innocent females who are famous actresses; and then there is Zuzu, a well-groomed, young, but romantically poor painter in his socks - he is the great conjurer, a wizard. Both the smooth transitions between the brilliant colours and the perfectly uniform picture surfaces are the result of the artist applying pigment with the smallest of brush-strokes. This disguises all trace of the painting process and the image's photographic past; instead, what we see are reflections of a "mystical" present tense, frozen images that glow softly with timeless brilliance."

Hungarian text: Noemi Forian-Szabo

English text adapted from the Hungarian by: Philip Barker

== Exhibitions ==
=== Selected solo exhibitions ===
- 2023 To Put On Glasses, The Space Contemporary Art Gallery, Budapest
- 2021 Lóránt Méhes Zuzu 70, Galeria K.A.S., Budapest
- 2016 New photos, Galeria Byart, Budapest - Lóránt Méhes exhibition, Léna & Roselly Gallery, Budapest
- 2015 Photos From The Seventies, Neon Gallery, Budapest
- 2014–2015 Constellation (Balázs Fekete, Pál Gerber, Lóránt Méhes), Supermarket Gallery, Budapest
- 2014 Lóránt Méhes Zuzu: A retrospective exhibition, Kiskunfélegyháza, Művelődési Ház
- 2013 We Are Resurrected (Zuzu-Vető), Neon Gallery, Budapest
- 2010 Lóránt Méhes Zuzu, Memoart Gallery, Budapest
- 2009 Lóránt Méhes Zuzu, Mono Gallery, Budapest
- 2008 Lóránt Méhes Zuzu, Memoart Gallery, Budapest
- 2007 Lóránt Méhes Zuzu: A retrospective exhibition, Ernst Museum, Budapest - Mari és Évike (Zuzu-Vető), Memoart Gallery, Budapest
- 2006 Zuzu-Vető, Kisterem Gallery, Budapest
- 2002: Little Pictures (1982-2002), Blitz Gallery, Budapest
- 2000: Memorial-Light-Picture, Vizivárosi Gallery, Budapest
- 1993 Lóránt Méhes exhibition, Fészek Gallery, Budapest
- 1991 An Altar of Divine Love, Dorottya Gallery, Budapest
- 1989 Altar In The Black Exhibition Space, Young Artists Club, Budapest - Méhes Lóránt, Vető János, Gasner János, Kiss László, Margitszigeti Víztorony, (Margaret Island Water Tower) Budapest
- 1988 Tales to Csilla, Liget Gallery, Budapest
- 1985 Post-traditionelle Kunst, Galeria Mana, Vienna
- 1984 - Flags, obo, obosutras, Stúdió Gallery, Budapest
- 1983 New flags, New Winds, Young Artists Club, Budapest - Ifjúsági Ház (Youth House), Székesfehérvár
- 1982 Cellar Sculpture Garden, Vajda Lajos Studio, Szentendre - It's beautiful today, Rabinext Gallery, Budapest
- 1981 Tibet Autumn Camp, (Zuzu-Vető), Young Artists Club, Budapest - New Tractor Operating Agency, Bercsényi Club, Budapest - Bam-Bam, Just A Little Louder... Bercsényi Club, Budapest

=== Selected group exhibitions ===
- 2022 Synthesis 2022, Széphárom Közösségi Tér, Budapest
- 2021 Standby exhibition, Budapest - Synthesis 2021, Széphárom Közösségi Tér, Budapest
- 2020 Art Market, Budapest
- 2019 Epoch Treasures, Danube Museum, Esztergom - The Freedom Of The Past, Magma Contemporary Art Space, Sfântu Gheorghe - Public Private Affairs, MűvészetMalom, Szentendre
- 2015 More Light! Light Environments, New Budapest Gallery, Budapest
- 2014 Hungarian Hippie, kArton Gallery, Budapest
- 2011 East of Eden - Photorealism, Ludwig Museum, Budapest - Group Exhibition, G13 Gallery, Budapest
- 2004 Freshly Painted, Hall of Art, Budapest
- 2003 Cream II., MEO Contemporary Art Collection, Budapest
- 2001 Cream I., MEO Contemporary Art Collection, Budapest
- 1998 Rose Presso, Ernst Museum, Budapest
- 1997 Oil/Canvas, Hall of Art, Budapest
- 1995 Circle and Light, Hungarian Culture Institute, New Delhi
- 1991 Contemporary Art, Hungarian National Gallery, Budapest
- 1989 Contemporary Hungarian Art, National Gallery, Prague and House of Arts, Bratislava
- 1987 Magical Artworks, Budapest Galéria, Budapest
- 1986-87 Aspekte Ungarischer Malerei der Gegenwart, Erholungshaus der Bayer AG, Leverkusen / Stadhalle Hagen / Stadthaus Galerie, Münster
- 1986 In Quotes, Csók István Képtár, Székesfehérvár
- 1985 101 objects, Óbuda Gallery, Budapest - Unkarin maalaustaidetta 1945-1985, Kaupungin talon Ala-Aula, Helsinki - Hungarian Arts in Glasgow – Eighteen Artists, Glasgow Art Center, Glasgow - Drei Generationen Ungarischer Künstler, Neue Galerie am Landesmuseum, Graz - Caption, Kunsthalle, Budapest - XI. Prezentacja Malarzy Krajów Socjalistycznych, Szczecin
- 1984 Newly painted, Ernst Museum, Budapest - Plánum ’84 Art Festival, Almássy Hall, Budapest - Gud & Gramatik, Charlottenborg, Kobenhaven - Grenzzeichen ’84, Landesgalerie im Schloss Esterházy, Eisenstadt
- 1983 "Álomi szép képek", Óbuda Gallery, Budapest
- 1982 It's beautiful today, Rabinec Atelier, Budapest - Egoland Art, Fészek Gallery, Budapest
