= Lajos Ernst =

Hungarian collector (1872–1937)

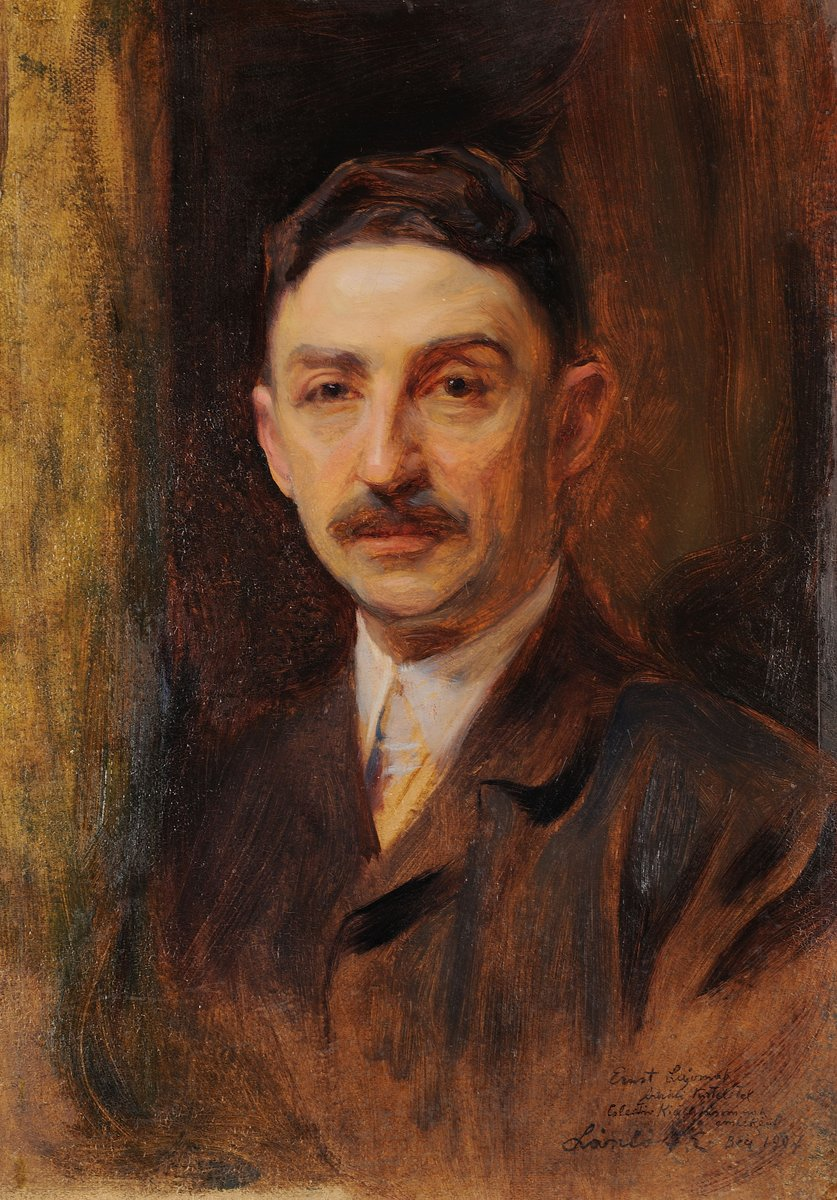
Portrait by Philip de László, 1907

Lajos Ernst (also spelled Ernszt; April 20, 1872 – April 1937) was a Hungarian collector, patron, museum director, member of the Szinyei Merse Pál Society.

== Biography ==
Lajos Ernst came from a wealthy Jewish family, the son of Mór merchant and Róza Steiner. He was 15 when he started collecting graphics, then other artwork. By 1894 he had lent a significant amount of paintings to exhibitions. In the same year he founded an exhibition. He had good contacts with the Hungarian painters. He recognized that the sketches were also valuable, so he collected them as well. In the following years he often arranged exhibitions.

By 1894 he had founded of the National Salon, and from 1901 to 1909 he was its executive director. In this capacity, he organized several oeuvre exhibitions (Pál Szinyei Merse, Mihály Zichy, Viktor Madarász, János Vaszary). After being removed from his position, he founded the first private museum in Hungary. In 1912 he founded the first Hungarian private museum. From 1917 he held auctions. He had good relations with the artists (including Viktor Madarász, Bertalan Székely, Mór Than, Oszkár Glatz).

The tomb of Lajos Ernst in Budapest. Israelite Cemetery on Kozma Street: 4-10-3. In May 1912, the Ernst Museum was opened in Budapest, at Nagymező u. Under 8, on the first floor of an apartment building built at the time. There were permanent exhibitions in 14 halls, and temporary exhibitions were held in the others. Ernst continued to organize retrospective exhibitions. Demanding catalogs of the exhibitions - edited by Béla Lázár - were published.

At the time of the boom in works of art, he began organizing auctions in 1917. They held an auction twice a year, until the end of Ernst's life. The economic situation changed dramatically in the late 1920s - as a result of the economic crisis and excessive purchases, Lajos Ernst collapsed financially.

His collection was encumbered with a mortgage, so an exhibition of works deposited in the Hungarian National Museum in 1933 was presented.

His wife was Erzsébet Ekler, with whom she married in Budapest on September 8, 1901. They divorced in 1918.

In the late 1920s he went bankrupt.

He killed himself in April 1937. After his death, his collection was auctioned off and his name was almost forgotten outside the narrow professional circles of art historians and cultural historians, even though his institution has surprisingly weathered all the storms of history and still bears the name of its founder. His life's work, his career in its entirety, has not been fully explored.

== Selected works ==
- A magyar történeti festészet (1910)
- Petőfi arcképei (1922)
- hungarlingva biografio
- hungarlingva biografio
