= Kazinczy Street Synagogue, Budapest =

Orthodox synagogue in Budapest, Hungary

Kazinczy Street Synagogue
- Hungarian: Kazinczy utcai zsinagóga
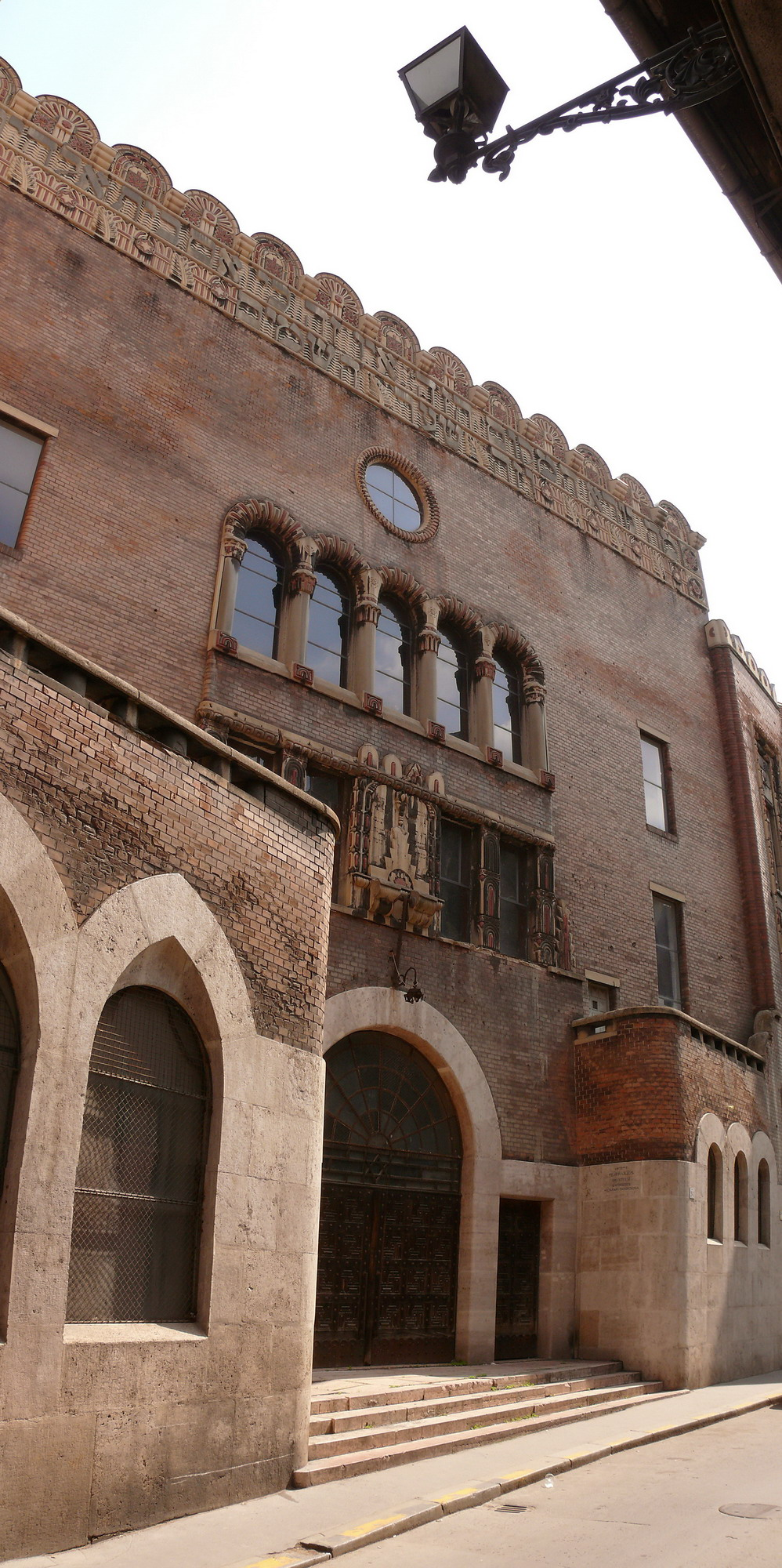
- The synagogue façade in 2008

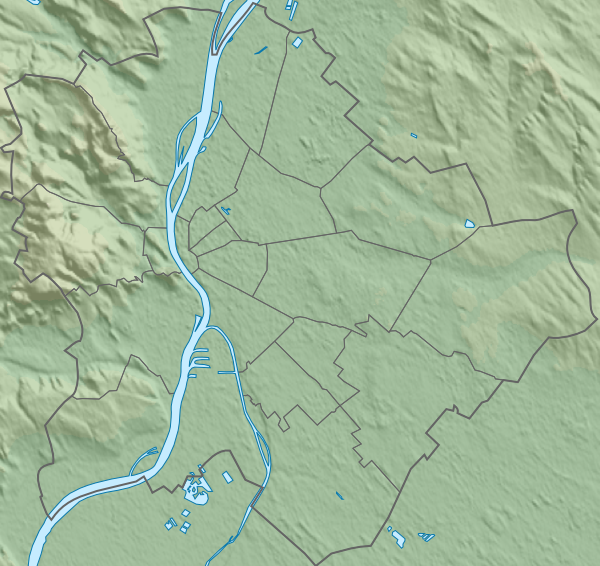
- Location of the synagogue in Budapest

Religion
- Affiliation: Orthodox Judaism
- Rite: Nusach Ashkenaz
- Ecclesiastical or organizational status: Synagogue
- Status: Active

Location
- Location: 29–31 Kazinczy Street, Pest, VII district, Budapest
- Country: Hungary
- Interactive map of Kazinczy Street Synagogue
- Coordinates: 47°29′54″N 19°3′45″E

Architecture
- Architects: Löffler, Béla and Sándor
- Type: Synagogue architecture
- Style: Art Nouveau
- Groundbreaking: 1912
- Completed: 1913
- Materials: Brick

Website
- kazinczyutcaizsinagoga.hu (in Hungarian)

The Kazinczy Street Synagogue (Hungarian: Kazinczy utcai zsinagóga), variously called the Sasz-Chevra Synagogue and the Great Orthodox Synagogue is an Orthodox Jewish congregation and synagogue complex, located at 29–31 Kazinczy Street, in Pest, in the VII district of Budapest, Hungary. The congregation worships in the Ashkenazi rite.

Completed in 1913, the synagogue is one of the most characteristic works of Hungarian synagogue architecture before World War I. The complex includes the synagogue, beit midrash, a residence for the rabbi, a Jewish school, offices, restaurant and a kitchen.

== History ==
=== Construction ===
In 1868, the Hungarian Jews of Pest split into three groups: Orthodox, Conservative, and Progessive. After the split, an Orthodox synagogue in Elizabeth City was built, starting in 1909. Kazinczy Street, owned by the Pest Autonomous Orthodox Jewish Community, was designated as a suitable site for construction. On June 25, 1909, the application for the design of a complete building complex was announced. The building would include, in addition to the synagogue, beit midrash, a community headquarters, a kindergarten, a school, and a public kitchen. Among the entries received by the deadline of November 1, the jury selected the designs of architects József Porgesz and Sándor Skultetzky, Emil Ágoston, Sándor Löffler and Béla Löffler.

At the end of the second round of the competition in April 1910, the committee recommended the work of Porgesz and Skultetzky to be carried out. In May, the community overruled the decision, and instead accepted the application of the Löffler brothers. 650,000 crowns were set aside for the construction costs, and the detailed design documentation was approved on November 8, 1910.

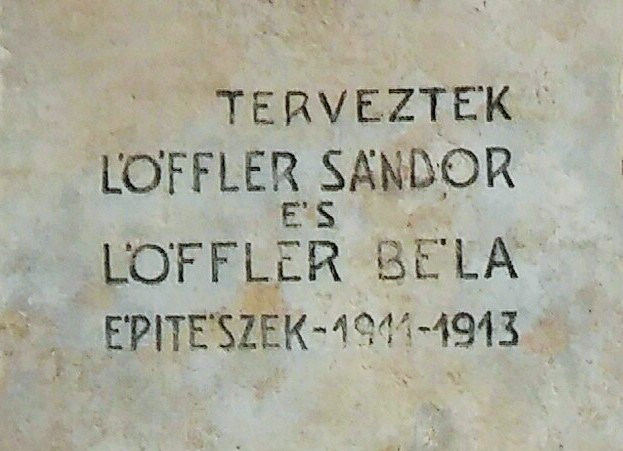
Plaque in honor of the Löffler brothers

The school and communal headquarters on the back of the plot were completed in 1911 and handed over in 1912. Construction of the synagogue began in the spring of 1912, but due to construction delays and unexpected costs, in July 1913 the Löffler brothers submitted a design change to a more ornate and less demanding main facade. The building was completed and the official commissioning permit was issued on September 29, 1913, in time for Rosh Hashanah.

=== World War II ===
The Kazinczy Street Synagogue has become the religious-cultural center of the Orthodox branch of Pest Jewry. Between 1928 and the 1940s, the mikveh (ritual bath) functioned in the building. The ritual bath was reopened in 2004. The building was located in the area of the Pest ghetto between 1944 and 1945, and was severely damaged by World War II.

=== Modern day ===
After 1945, the building complex was restored and the equipment was reconstructed. Over the following decades, the physical facade of the Great Synagogue deteriorated, becoming unfit for use by the end of the 20th century. The Israeli community received the ground floor tract of ELTE's adjacent Teacher Training College. A small, modern house of worship, the Sas-Chevra Synagogue, was built here by Sándor Bokor, a community engineer.

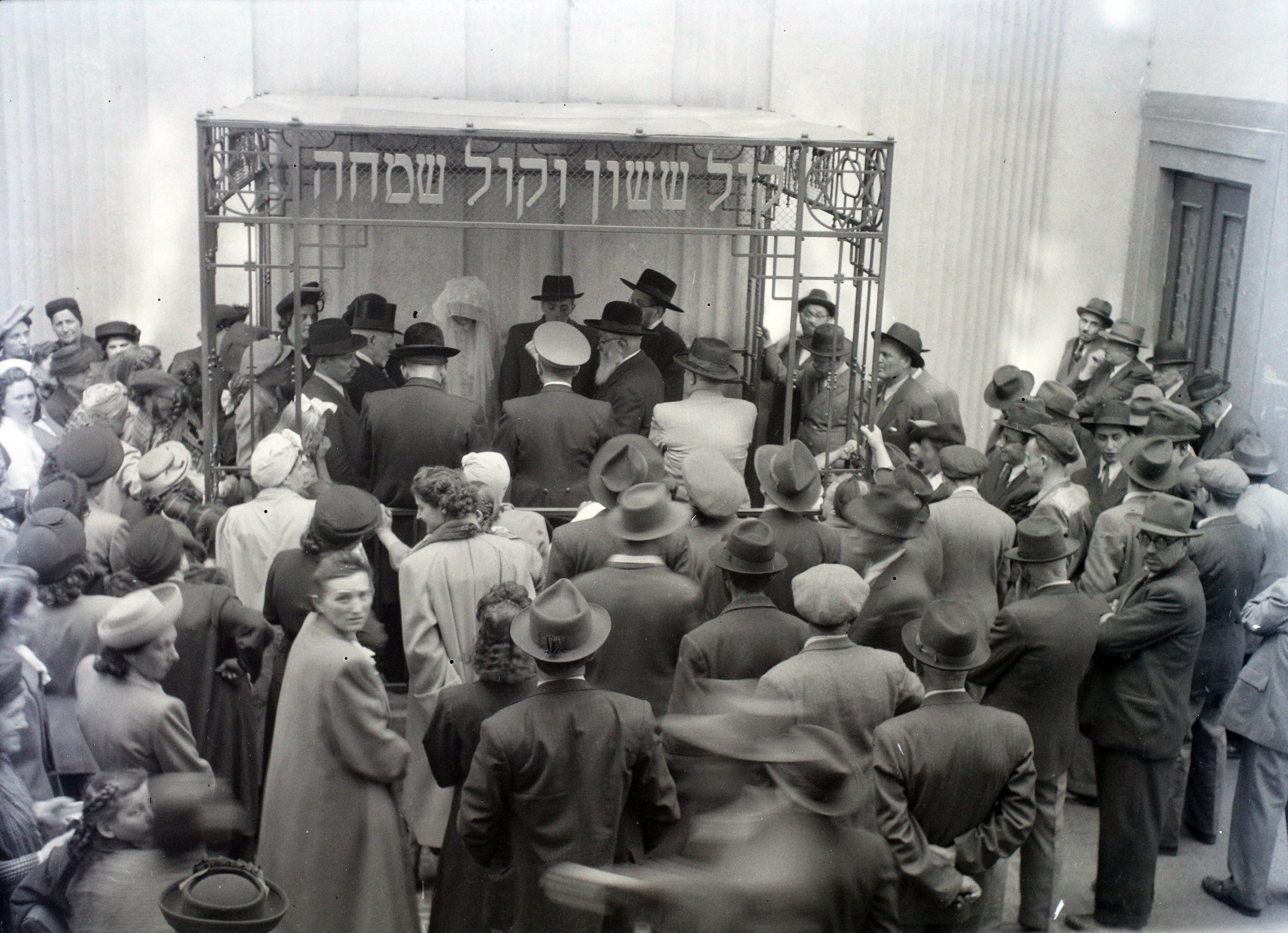
A marriage ceremony taking place in the synagogue in 1946

The Hungarian Orthodoxy officially reformed in 1993. Today, the Great Synagogue can be visited for an entrance fee of 13 euros and since 2012, it is a state-recognized historical building of Hungary. It can house approximately one thousand congregants.

The Great Synagogue is in need of repairs. The exterior facade is at risk of collapsing, and the roof is no longer water-tight. Air conditioning and heating do not work. There is currently a fundraising project to raise money for these renovations.

In 2023, congregants wishing to pray were locked out of the building due to renovations.

== Architecture ==
The Great Synagogue is Hungary's only Art Noveau synagogue. The Löffler brothers' building designs were inspired by both Ödön Lechner's Art Nouveau nationalist architecture of the post-World War I era and the formal influence of the late Viennese Art Nouveau.

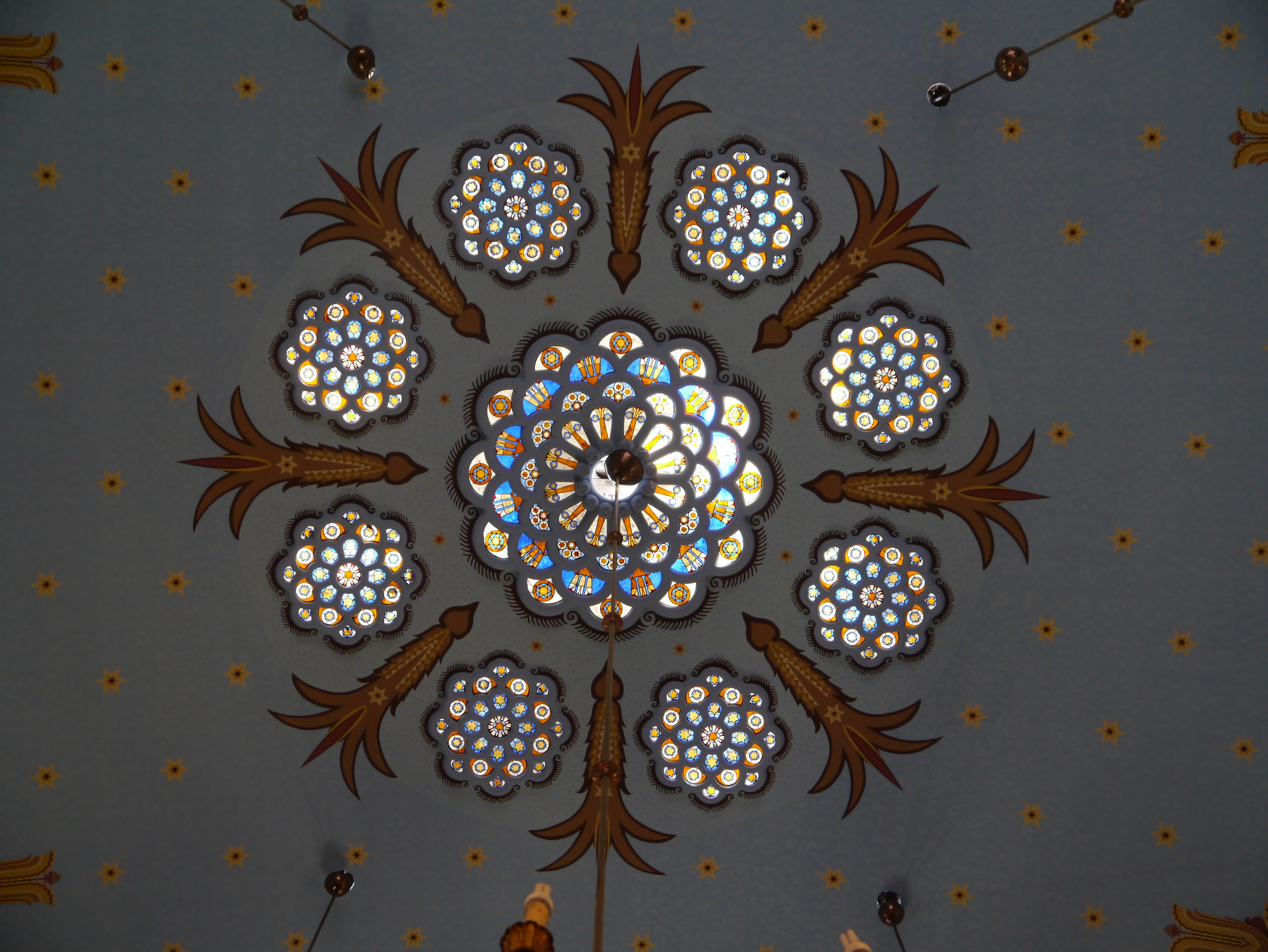
Stained glass windows designed by Miksa Róth

The monumental block features elegant facades and sparingly decorated details. The site designated for construction was rather narrow to carry out such a grandiose design, so the wing buildings flanking the main façade were terraced. The divided mass of the façade (approaching Rákóczi Street) seems to dominate over Kazinczy Street.

The colorful stained glass windows were designed by Miksa Róth. It also features Zsolnay porcelain decorations.

Located on a two-story, patio-fronted main façade at four steps, the wrought-iron main gate with two smaller side entrances. Upstairs there are rectangular and semicircular windows with a rose window on top. The unity of the raw brick façade is sometimes broken by colorful artificial stone decoration. Above the travertine-covered ground floor, a double stone table was placed between the first-floor windows. The influence of the Viennese Art Nouveau on the stained-glass windows of David's star and menorah is illustrated. During the high-rise bidding, there is a two-line Hebrew quotation from the Old Testament throughout the facade ("What awe is this place: this is God's house and this gate of heaven", Gen 28:17).

== Clergy ==
Reich Jakov Koppel was the chief rabbi from 1890 to 1929, when he passed away.

== Gallery ==
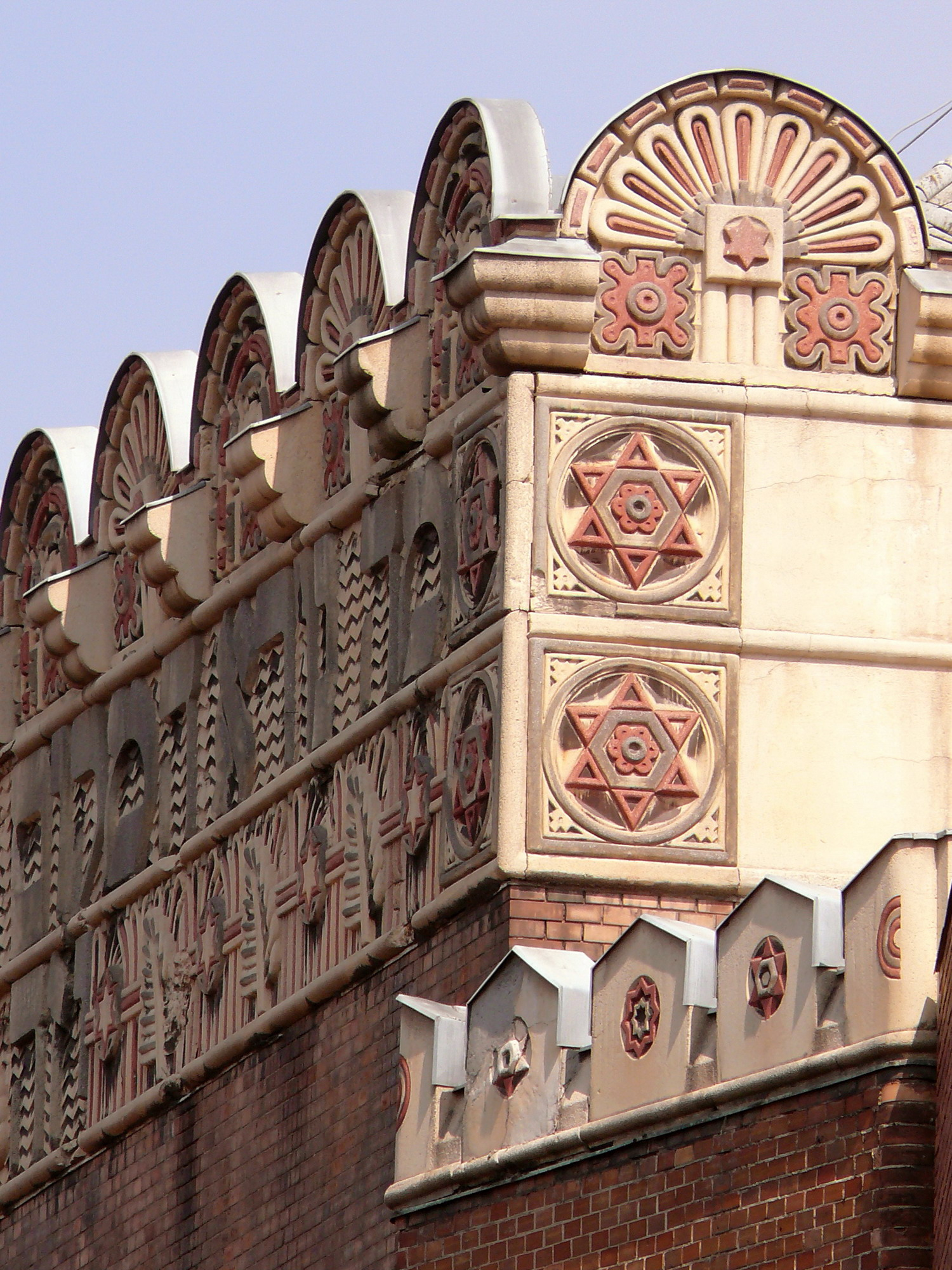
The crenel of the Kazinczy Street Synagogue

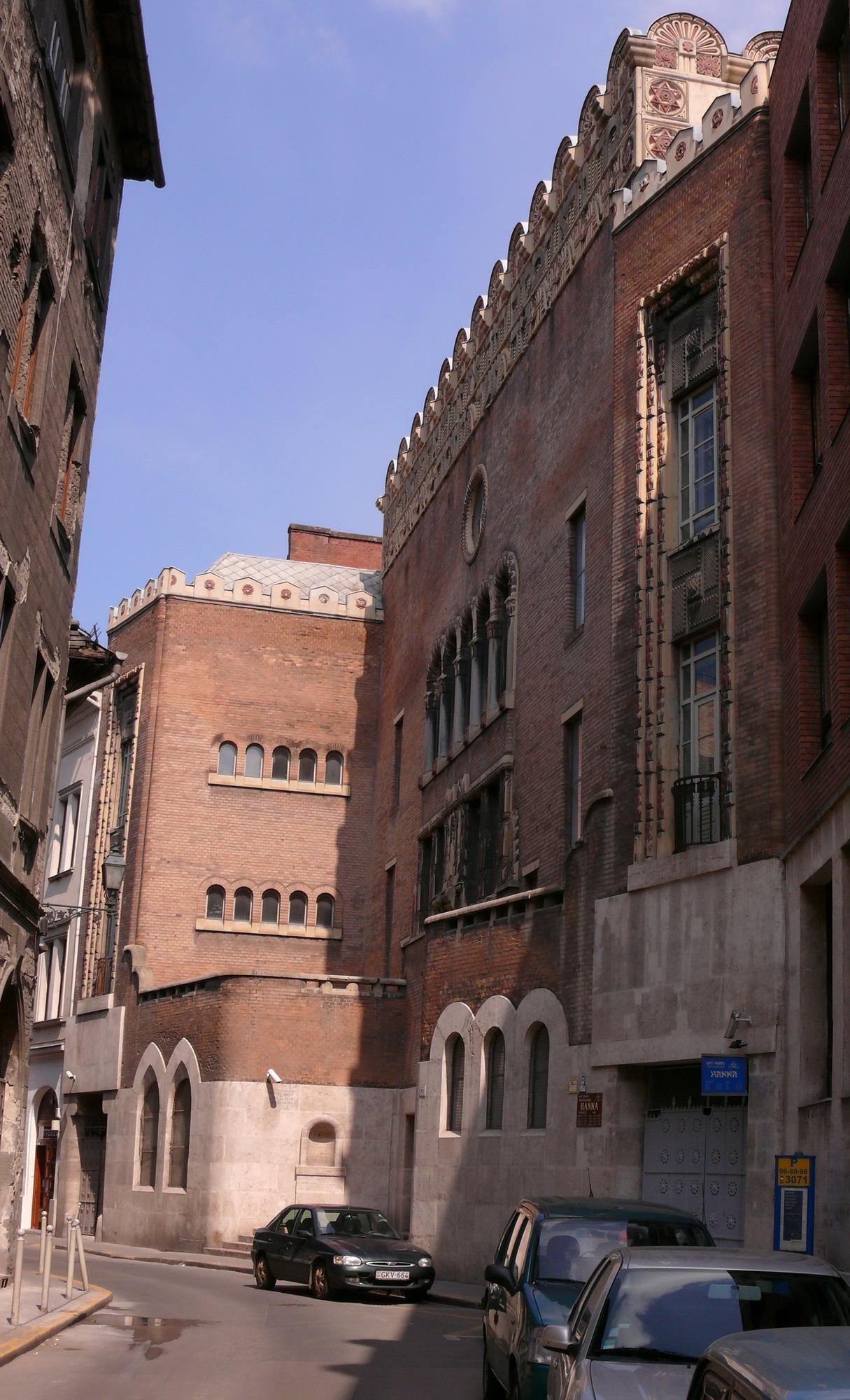
Kazinczy Street Synagogue from the street

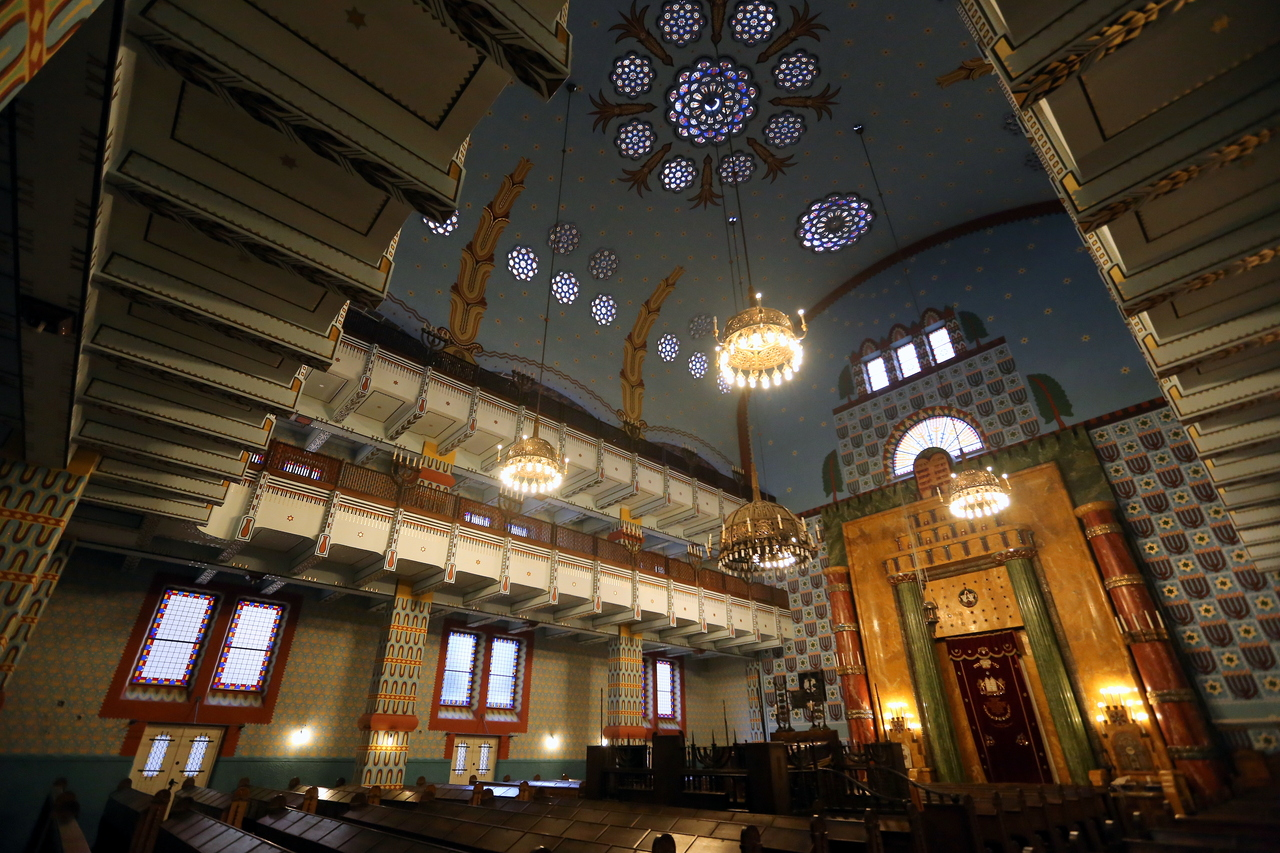
The interior roof with its stained glass windows

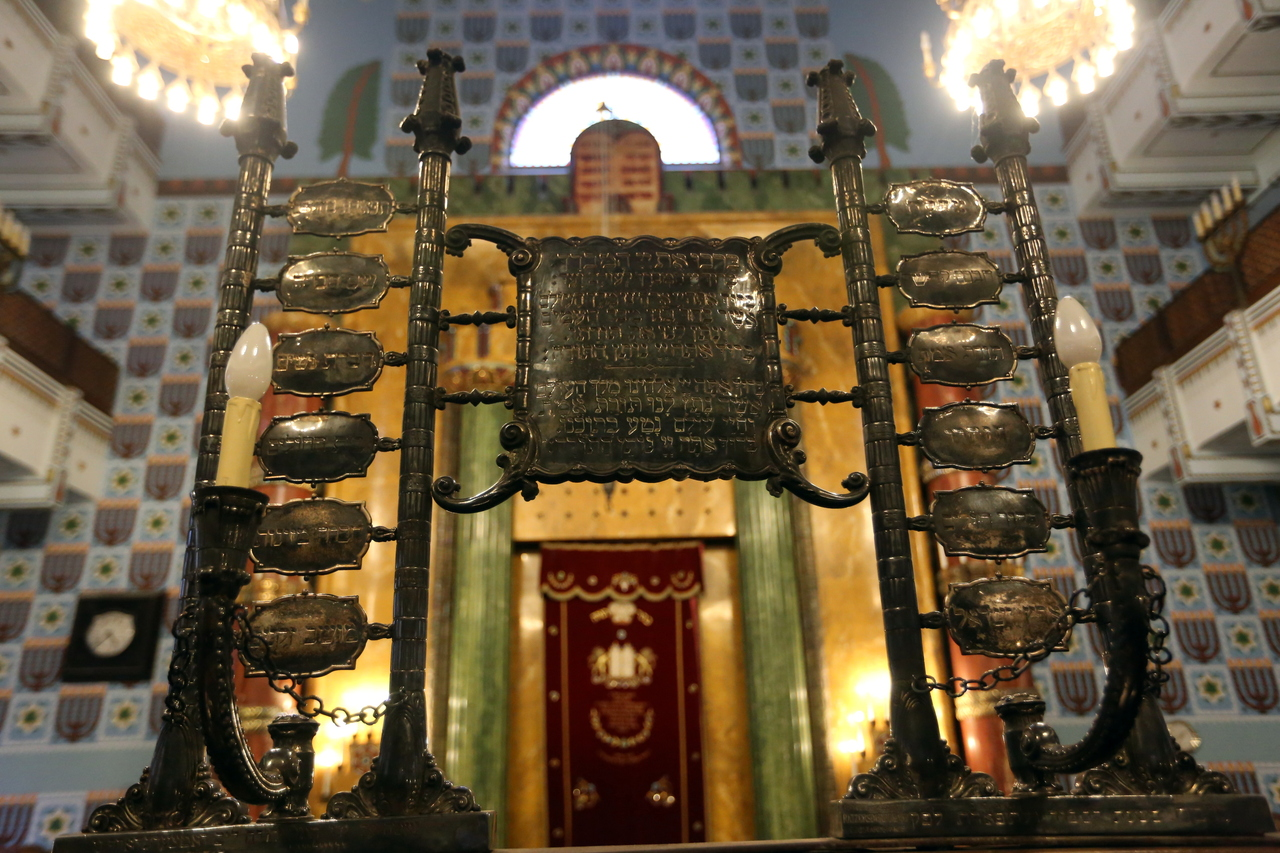

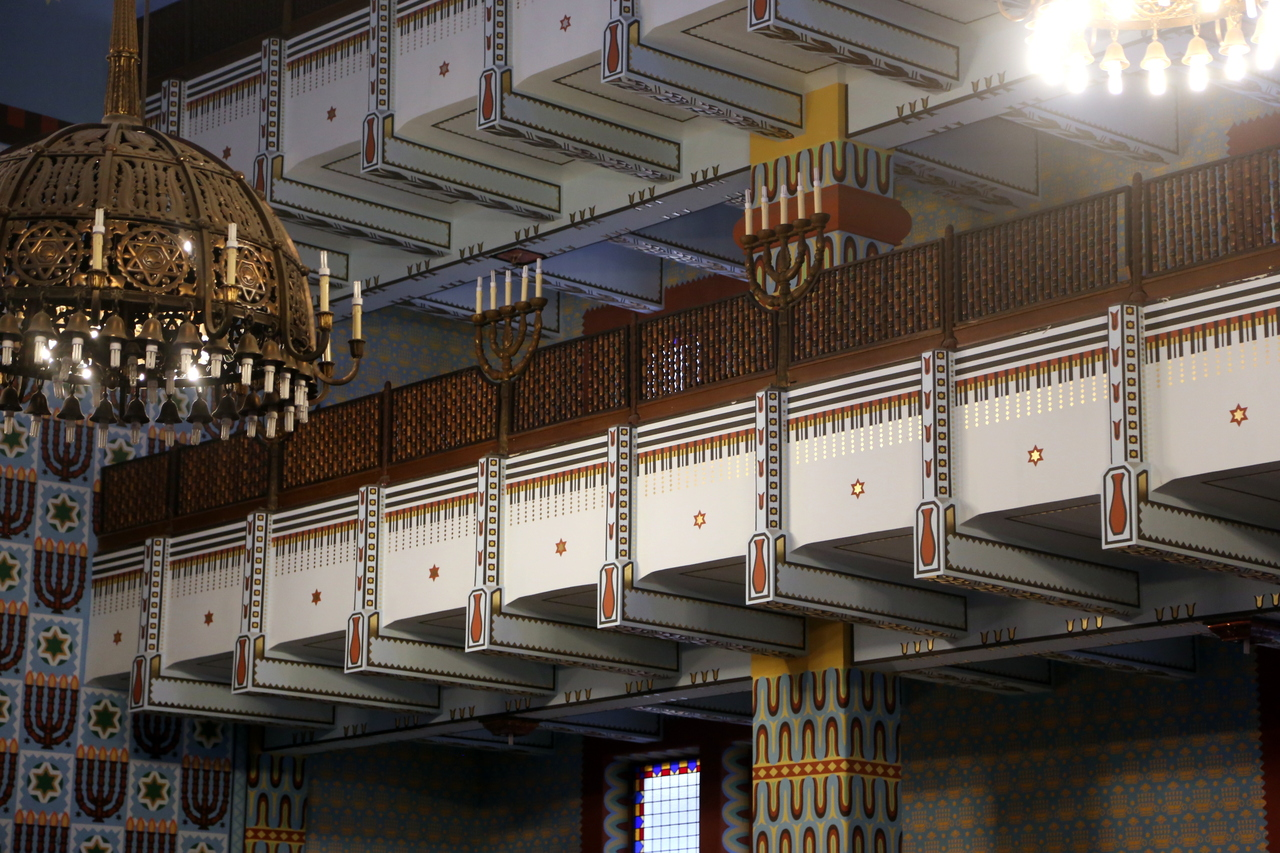
Balcony with Art Nouveau designs

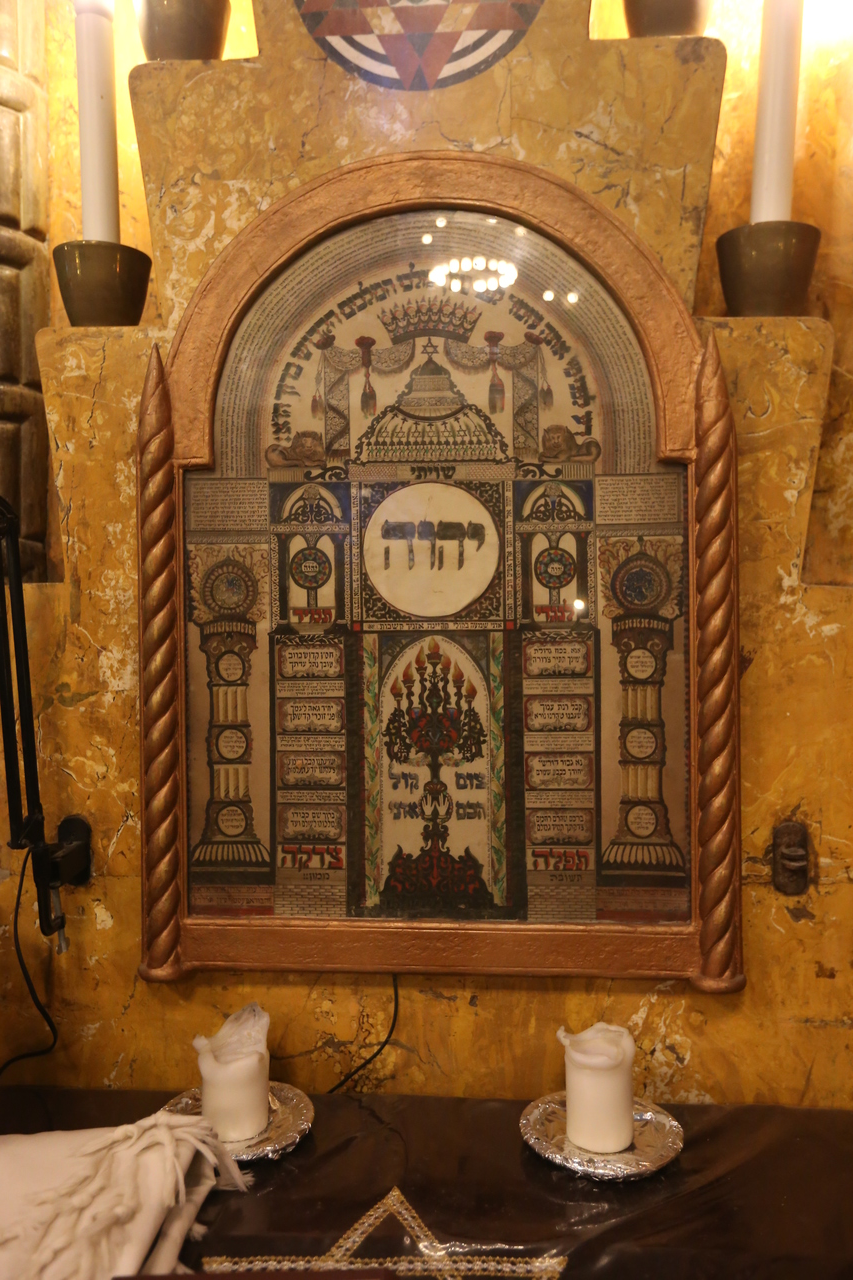

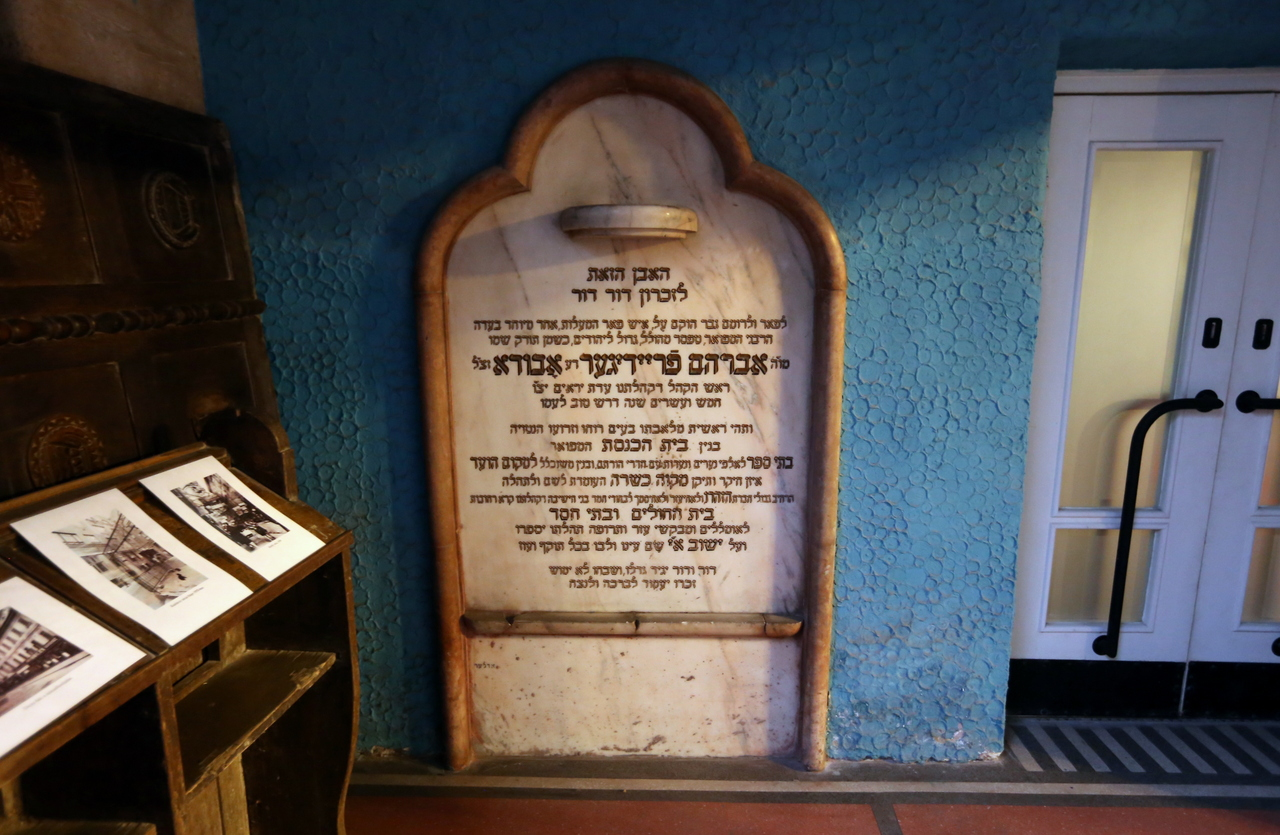

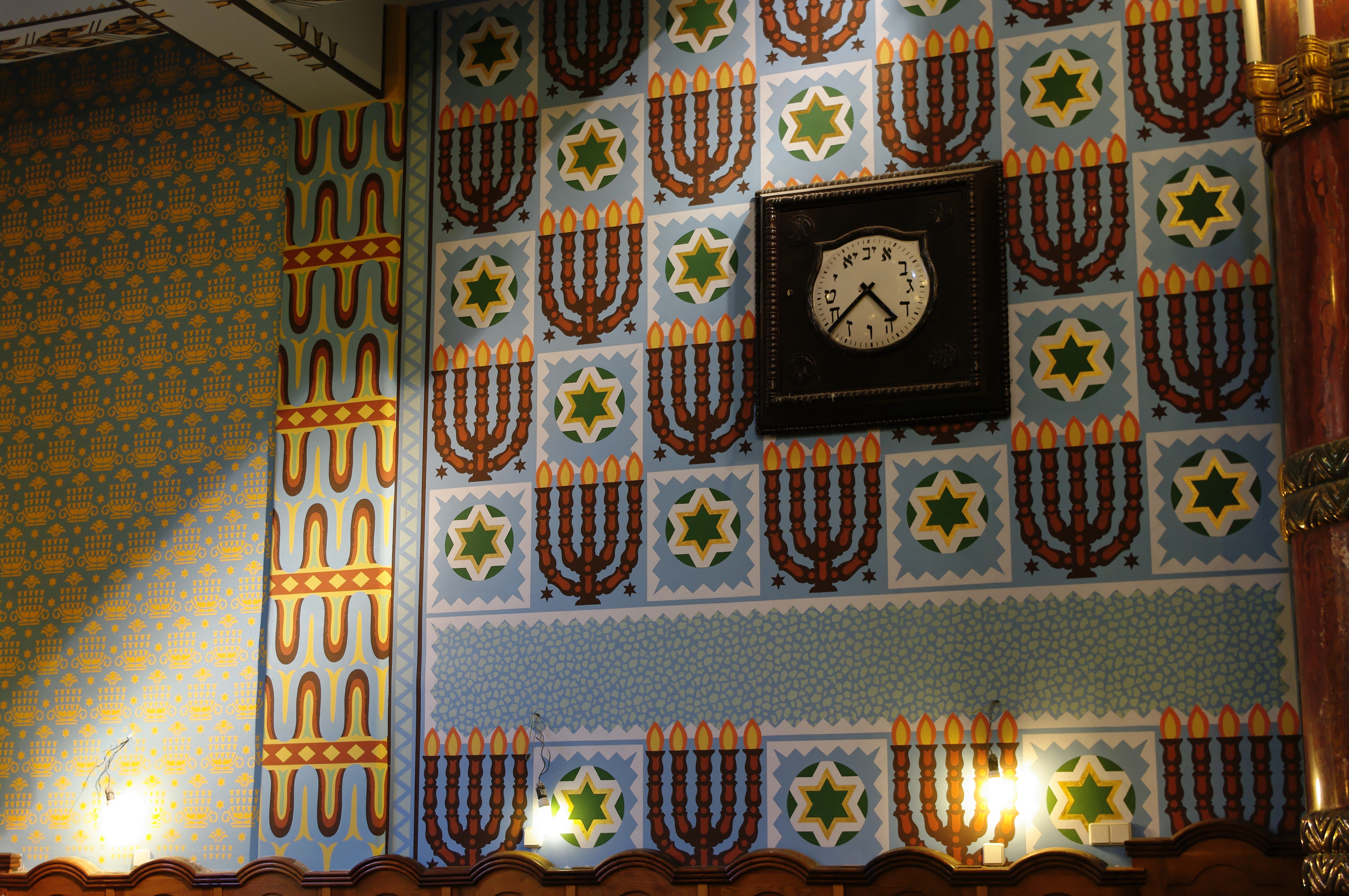
Painted designs

== See also ==
- History of the Jews in Hungary
- List of synagogues in Hungary
- List of tourist attractions in Budapest
