= Trabant (Hungarian band) =

Hungarian band

Trabant was a circle of young songwriters and amateur musicians coworking as a band between 1981 and 1987. Most of the music and words were written by Gábor Lukin, János Vető and Mihály Víg, while minor contributions came from György Kozma, Károly Hunyady, János Xantus and József Dénes "Dönci". The two main voices were visual artist and actress Marietta Méhes and Mihály Víg, occasionally Tamás Pajor, Mariann Urbán and Attila Grandpierre. Among other musicians were János Másik and Jenő Menyhárt of Európa Kiadó. Apart from a few film appearances the band seldom performed publicly and never worked in studio; they focused on writing songs and instantly recording them one by one under lo-tech domestic circumstances. Their texts are best described by the words enigmatic, intertextual, grotesque and absurd; their musical style does not fall into any of the known musical categories.

János Vető is one of the band's founders and lyricist, as well as a photo and video artist. He photographed the band members from the 1970s. He made several videos for the songs of the band Trabant. His video channel is NahTe53, including the Trabant playlist.

== Filmography ==
While Trabant does not have a discography in the proper sense, the body of hundred-and-some individual recordings is being collected, organised and prepared by Gábor Lukin, for future release, and part of it has been merged into other bands' repertoires in various covers and arrangements. The band, however, appears in a number of feature and documentary films.

- Időt töltök (Zoltán Gazsi, documentary on the band filmed 1982-1984, released 1993)
- Eszkimó asszony fázik (János Xantus 1984)
- Diorissimo (János Xantus 1980)
- Members with A. E. Bizottság: Kutya éji dala (Gábor Bódy 1983)

== Discography ==
- Trabant - Eszkimó asszony fázik, 1984, vinyl, Hungaroton
- 1.2.3...Start: Új hullám (1981), 2000, vinyl, Hungaroton
- trabant, 2024, vinyl, purgexxx (300 ed.)
- trabant II, 2025, vinyl, purgexxx (500 ed.)
