= Veto, West Virginia =

Veto
- Unincorporated community
- Location within the state of West Virginia Veto (the United States)
- Coordinates: 39°36′42″N 80°50′32″W
- Country: United States
- State: West Virginia
- County: Wetzel
- Elevation: 620 ft (190 m)
- Time zone: UTC-5 (Eastern (EST))
  - Summer (DST): UTC-4 (EDT)
- GNIS ID: 1555887

Veto is an unincorporated community in Wetzel County, West Virginia, United States.
