= Lajos Vető =

Hungarian Bishop (1904–1989)

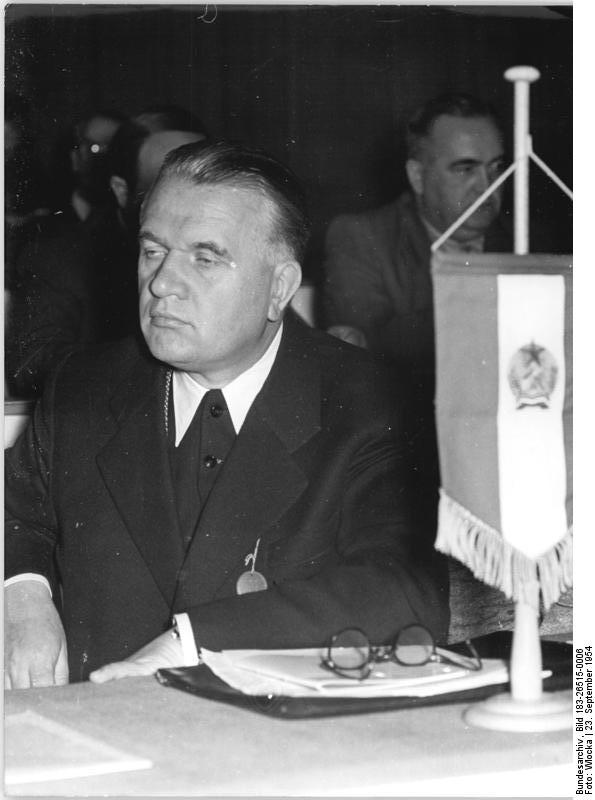
Lajos Vető in Weimar

Lajos Vető (1904–1989) was a Hungarian Lutheran bishop sympathetic to the communist leadership. The communist government replaced Bishop Lajos Ordass as head of Hungary's Lutherans with Lajos Vető following Ordnass' "anti-communist address" at the International Lutheran assembly in Minneapolis. Lajos Vető resigned his position after the Hungarian revolt, but returned to post in December 1957.
