= Miksa Róth =

Hungarian mosaicist and stained glass artist

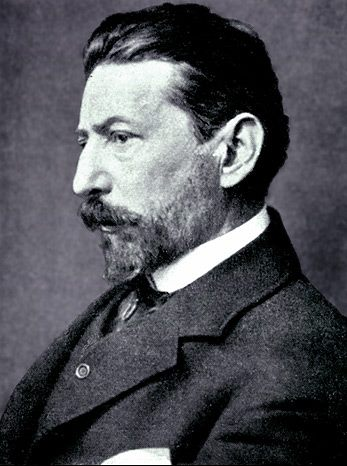
- Born: 26 December 1865
- Died: 14 June 1944 (aged 78); Budapest
- Resting place: Törökbálint
- Occupation: Glass painter, artist

Miksa Róth (26 December 1865 – 14 June 1944) was a Hungarian mosaicist and stained glass artist responsible for making mosaic and stained glass prominent art forms in Hungarian art. In part, Róth was inspired by the work of Pre-Raphaelite artists Edward Burne-Jones and William Morris.

Róth apprenticed at his father, Zsigmond Róth's leaded stained glass studio. Starting a business in 1885, he would make commissions for a number of buildings, largely in Budapest, including the Hungarian Parliament Building and the Buda Castle. Róth also received a number of commissions outside the country as well, for example the National Theatre of Mexico.

Róth started his first workshop in 1885, but he didn't become famous until ten years later when the Hungarian Millennial Exhibition took place in 1896. During that time, he was given the important task of creating stained-glass artworks for the Parliament building. The talent for working with glass was something Róth inherited from his family, who had been skilled in this art for many generations.

The young boy worked as an apprentice in his father's workshop, where he learned how to stain glass and make tempered glass. The first buildings he worked on were the Bobula Palace on Andrássy út and the Hall of Industry for the Millennial Exhibition. Unfortunately, these buildings were later destroyed during World War II.

Róth designed the Art Nouveau stained glass windows of the Kazinczy Street Synagogue.

== Early life ==
Miksa Róth was born in Pest in 1865. Both his father and grandfather were glassworkers, and Miksa followed in their footsteps. To enhance his skills, he traveled to different countries on a study tour to learn from renowned glass masters. At the age of 20, he began working independently while also collaborating with famous artists from various fields. In recognition of his talent, he was honored by the Emperor and King and became a Royal Court artist. In 1911, he established his own studio at Nefelejcs Street 26, which is now the Memorial House where he and his family resided.

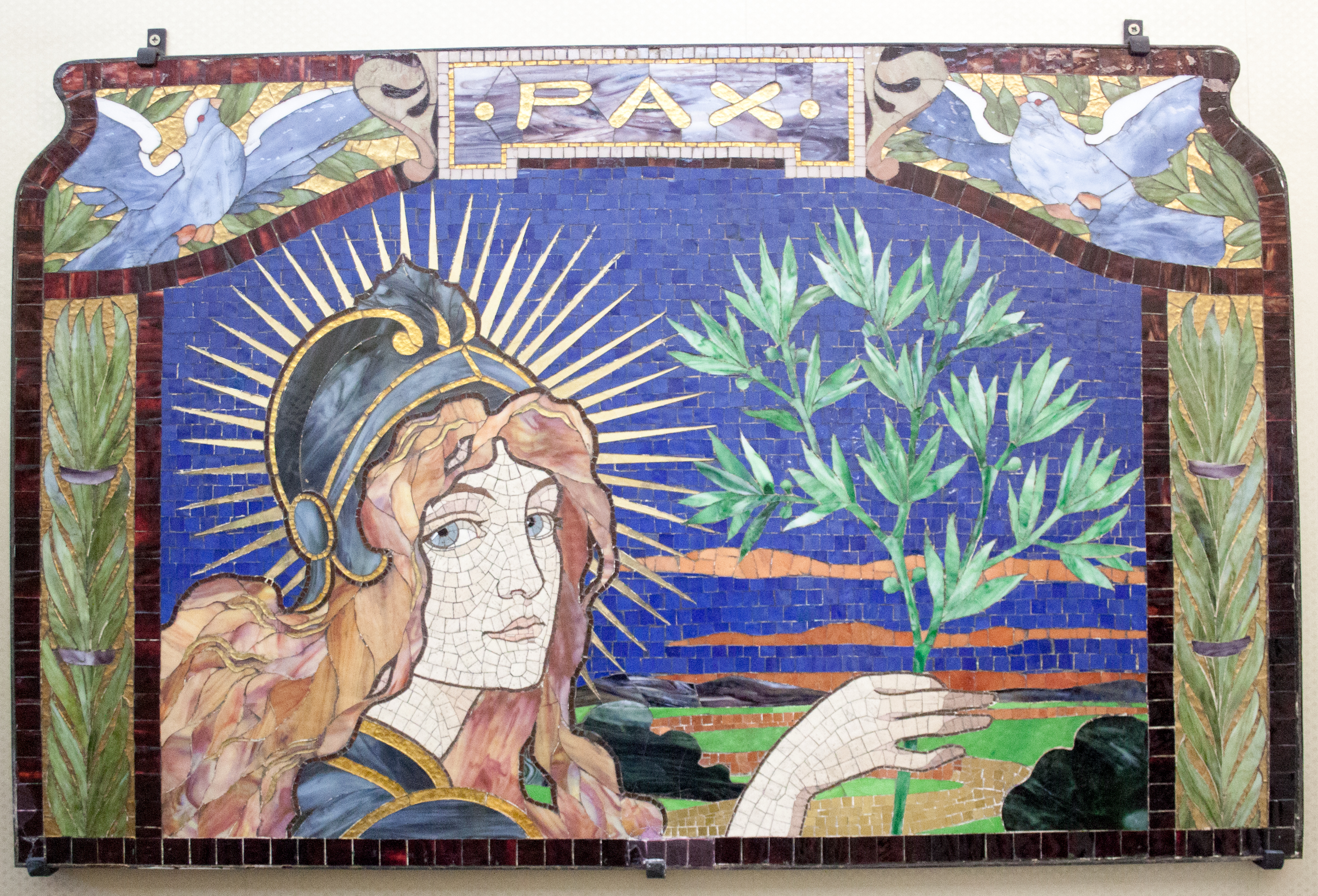
Pax, received silver medal of the Paris World Exhibition in 1900

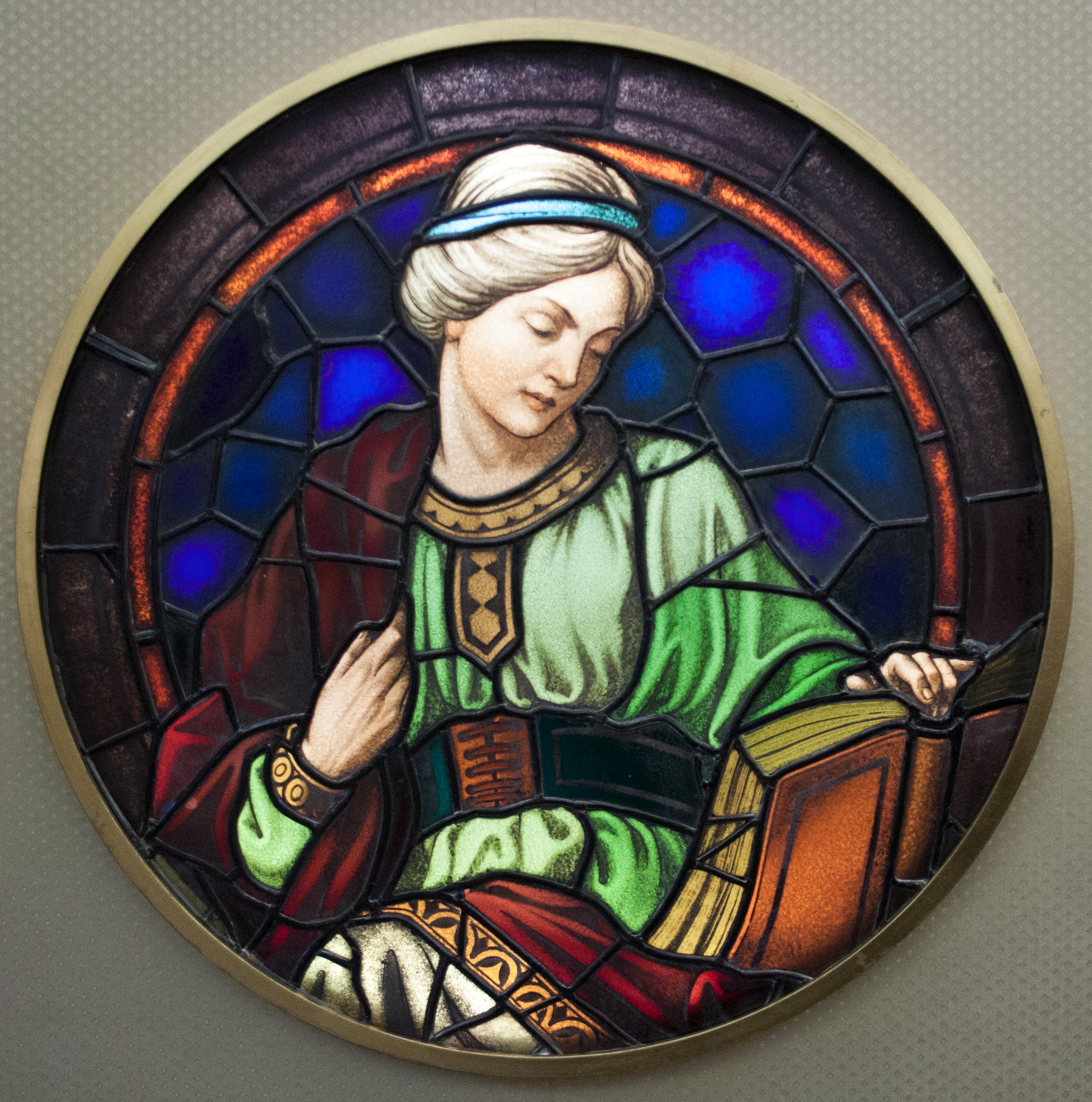
The Allegory of Erudition, 1910

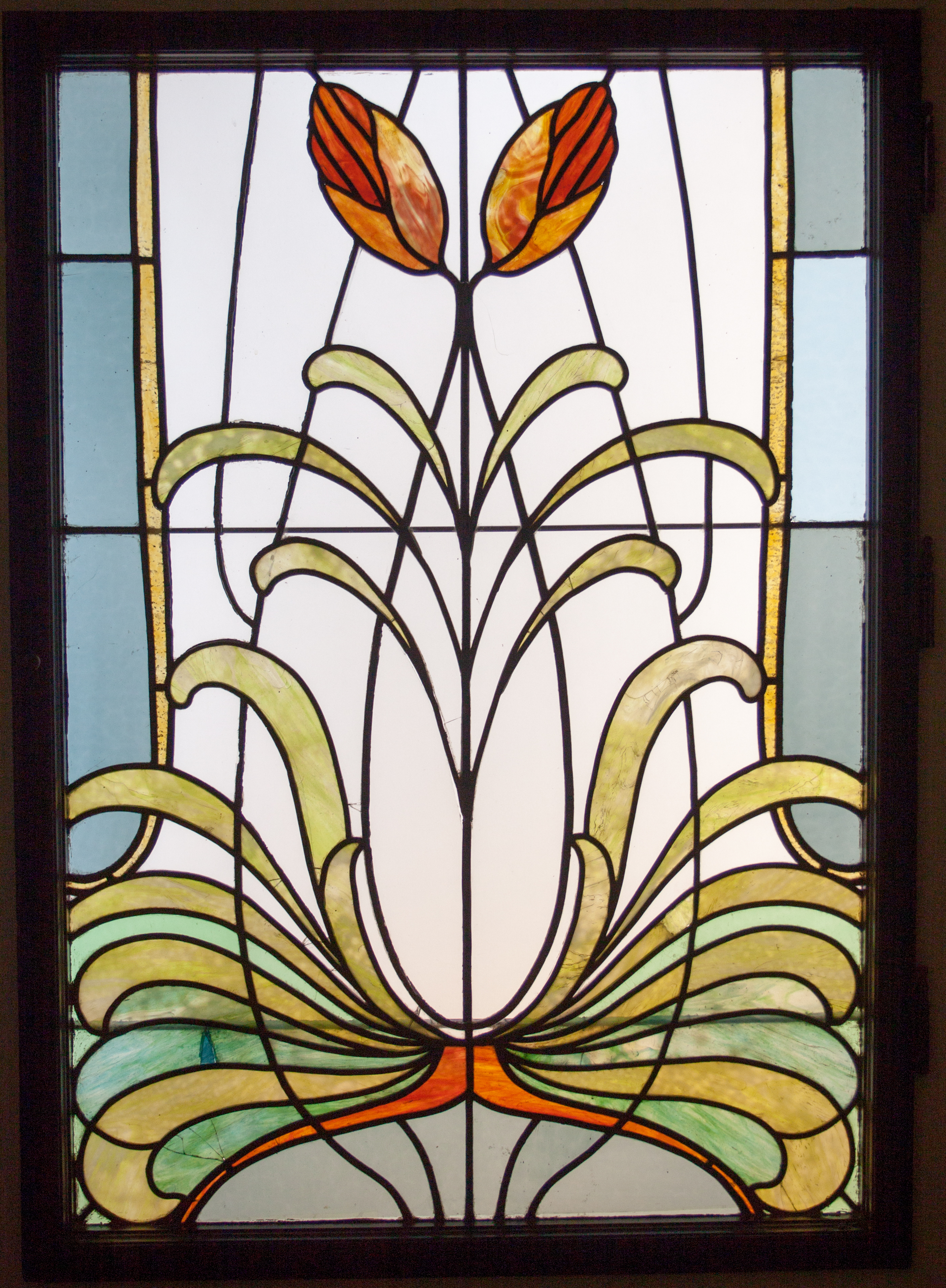
Window with flower motives from the Villa Alpár, 1903

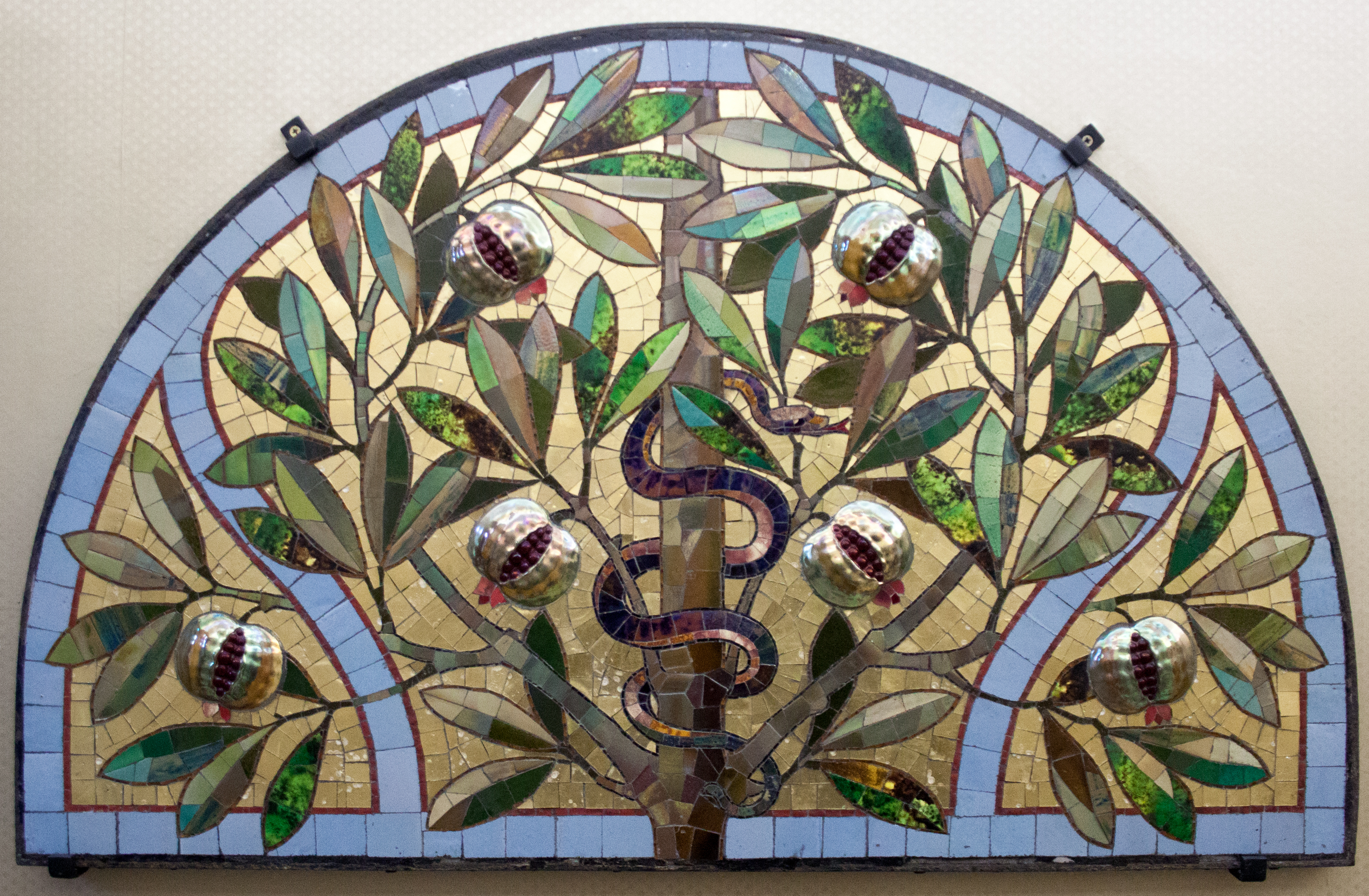
Mosaic with pomegranates, 1898
