= Európa Kiadó =

Hungarian band

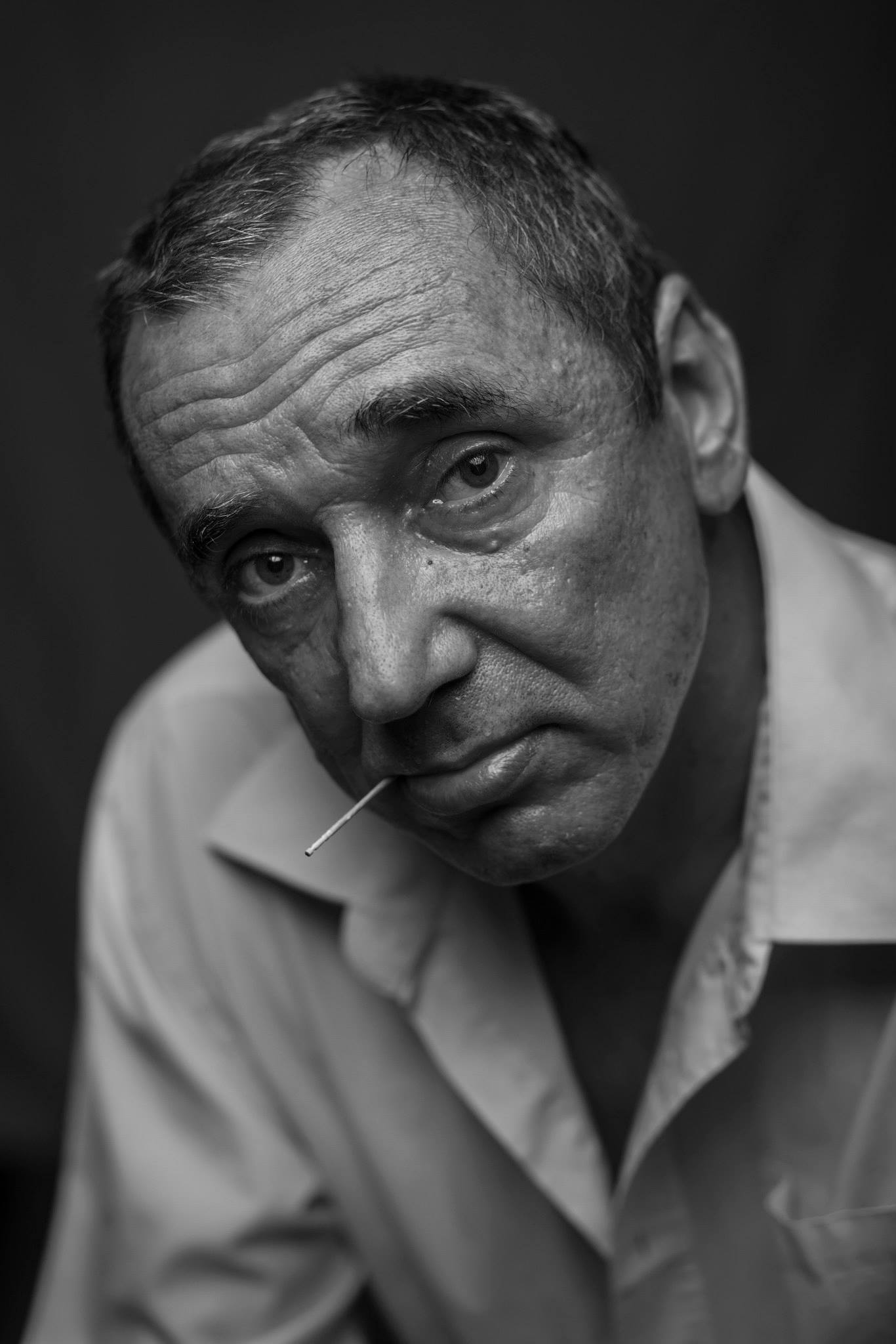
- Jenő Menyhárt

Background information
- Origin: Budapest, Hungary
- Genres: Underground, new wave
- Years active: 1981–present
- Labels: Profil; EMI Quint; Bahia Music
- Spinoff of: URH
- Members: Jenő Menyhárt; János Másik; Péter Kirschner; Lajos Gyenge; Bence Fülöp; Benedek Darvas
- Past members: András Salamon; József Dénes; Péter Magyar; András Gerő; László Kiss; Orsolya Varga

Európa Kiadó is a Hungarian underground rock band formed in 1981 in Budapest from the members of the then freshly disbanded URH: László Kiss, András Salamon and lyricist-composer-guitarist-singer Jenő Menyhárt, joined by József Dénes and András Gerő. Soon keyboardist Gerő and drummer Salamon parted, and got replaced by János Másik and Péter Magyar. Európa Kiadó was, and is on the verge of breaking up all through its lifetime with many pauses and farewell concerts, the first being in 1983, two years after its foundation. On releasing their first studio album, Popzene in 1987 (which was preceded by many other recordings and concert programs that were published as albums much later, with irregular delays), Másik left the band for a while, Dönci, for religious reasons, for ever, to only return as cameo in later concerts; and on their 1989 album, Szavazz rám, Sziámi's János Gasner played the lead guitar. In 1990, not long before two of the founding members left the country for a longer period, Orsolya Varga became the permanent keyboardist, Péter Kirschner the guitarist, and the lineup remained unchanged until 2008, when Péter Magyar was appointed background percussionist, first accompanied by, then fully replaced by other drummers.

== Partial Discography ==
- A pusztulás piszkozatai (Drafts of decay, 1981, unreleased)
- Soundtrack of the film Városbújócska (Urban hide and seek) with Jiří Stivín and János Másik (1985)
- Popzene (Popmusic, 1987)
- Szavazz rám (Vote for me, 1989)
- Itt kisértünk - Love'92 (Here we haunt - Love'92 , 1993)
- És mindig csak képeket (And always just images, Concert at Katona József Theatre, 1994)
- Love '82 (1997)
- Jó lesz '84 (It will be good'84, 1997)
- A Zichy Kastélyban (1998 release of the 1986 concert at Zichy Residence)
- Így vonulunk be (That's how we march in, 2004-5 DVD)
- Annak is kell (2013)

== Members ==
The band had many contributors through its history. Though the longest standing lineup is clearly Jenő Menyhárt (bandleader), László Kiss (bass) Péter Kirschner (guitar), János Másik and Orsolya Varga (keyboards) and Péter Magyar (drums), it is neither the original, nor the current one.

=== Former, temporary and session ===
- guitarists: Dönci, János Gasner, Zoltán "Spenót" Tóth, Leó Menyhárt
- keyboardists: András Gerő, Ákos Dióssy, Ágnes Kamondy
- drummers: András Salamon, János Solti, Gábor Molnár ("Lóhalál"), Lajos Gyenge
- miscellaneous (guest performers, co-authors etc.): Péter Ogi, Joe Dissou, Ágnes Bárdos Deák, Péter Müller "Sziámi", Mihály Víg, János Vető
