= Ernst Museum =

Art museum in Budapest, Hungary

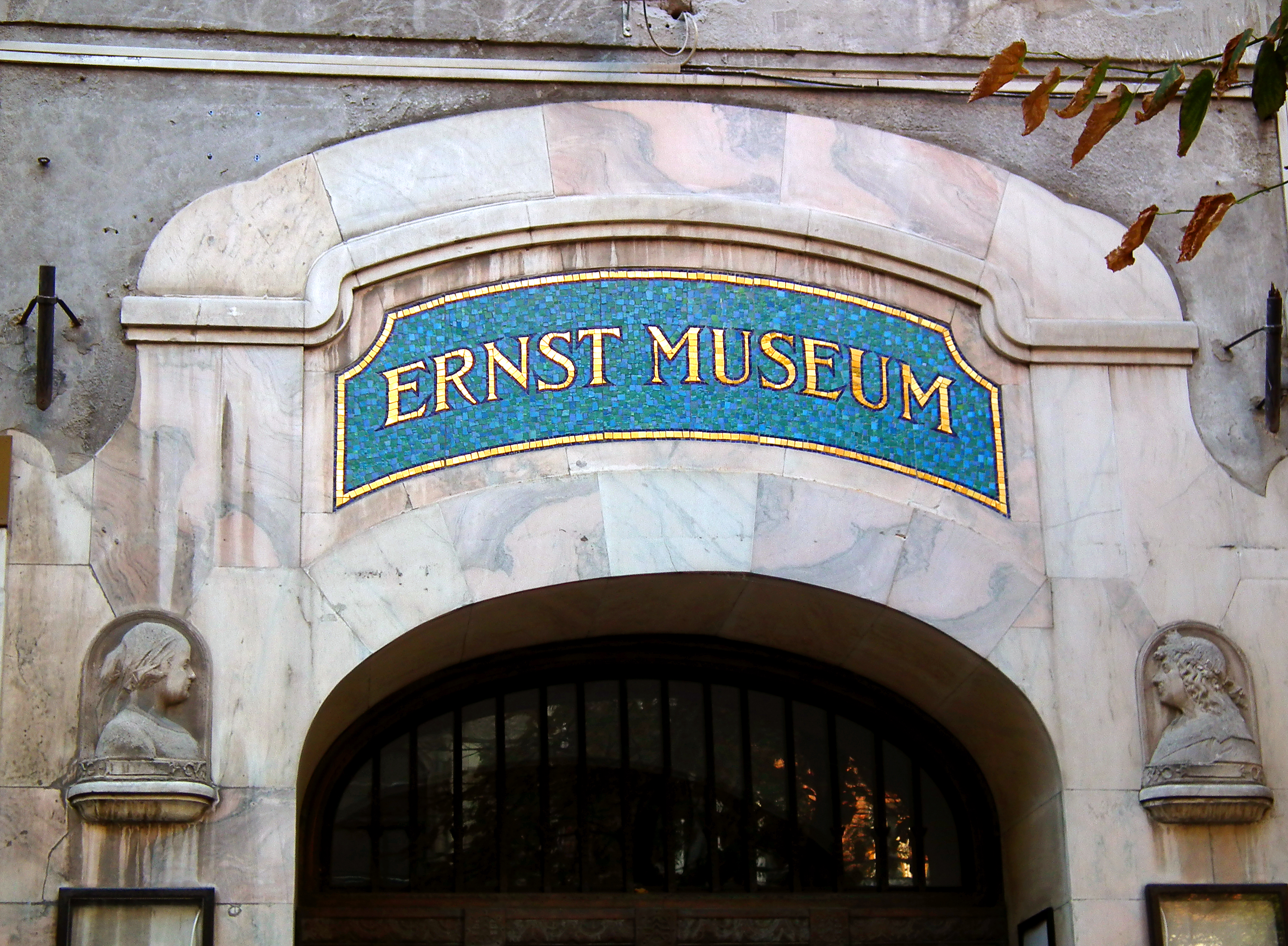
- Established: 1912
- Location: Nagymező utca 8. Budapest; Hungary
- Coordinates: 47.502361°N 19.061589°E
- Website: http://ernstmuseum.wordpress.com

The Ernst Museum (Hungarian : Ernst Múzeum) is an art museum located in Budapest's VI District. Since 2013, it is also home to the Robert Capa Contemporary Photography Center.
