= Hall of Art, Budapest =

Art museum in Budapest, Hungary

Coordinates: 47°30′50.48″N 19°4′43.24″E

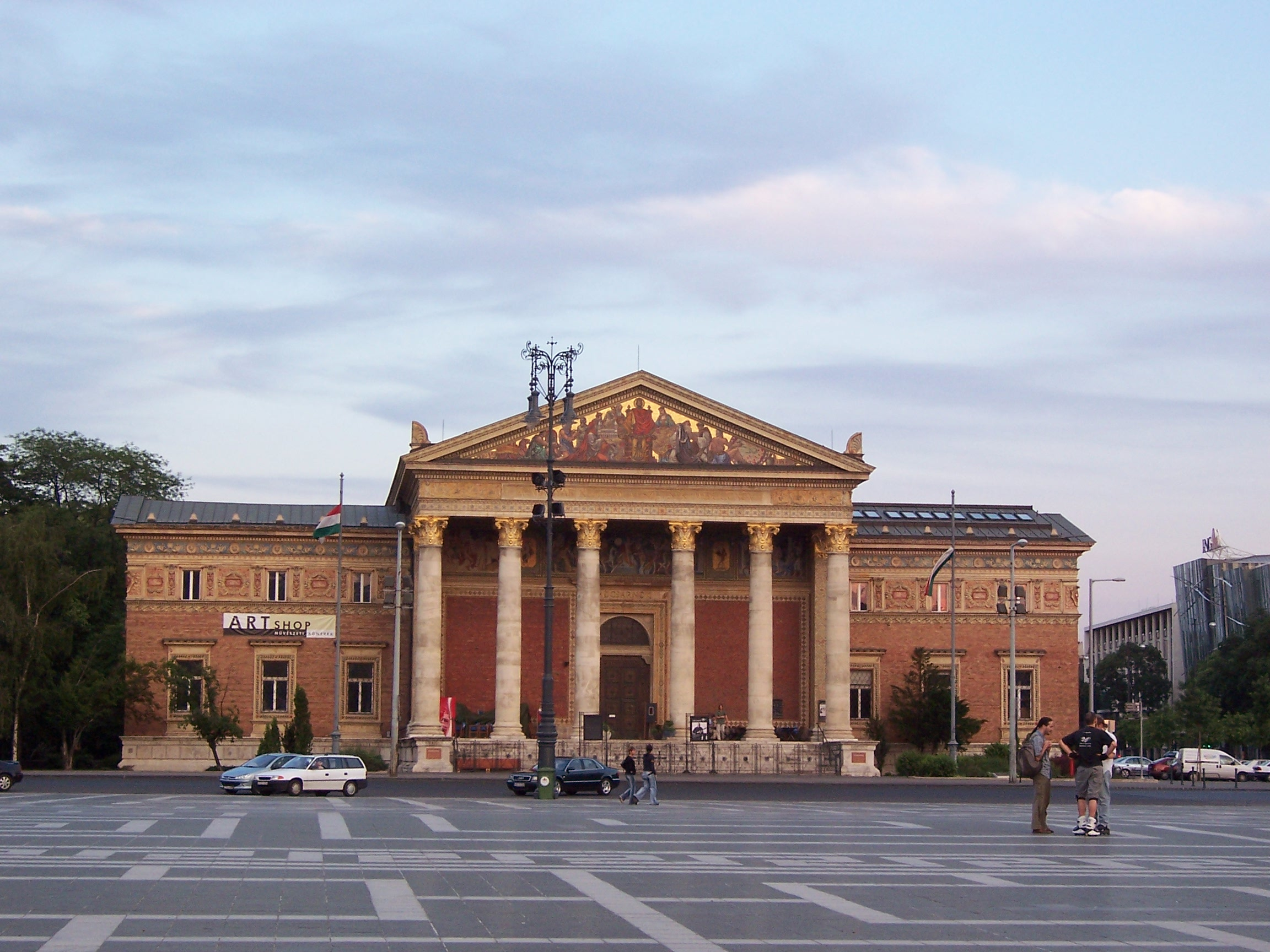
Palace of Art and Heroes' Square

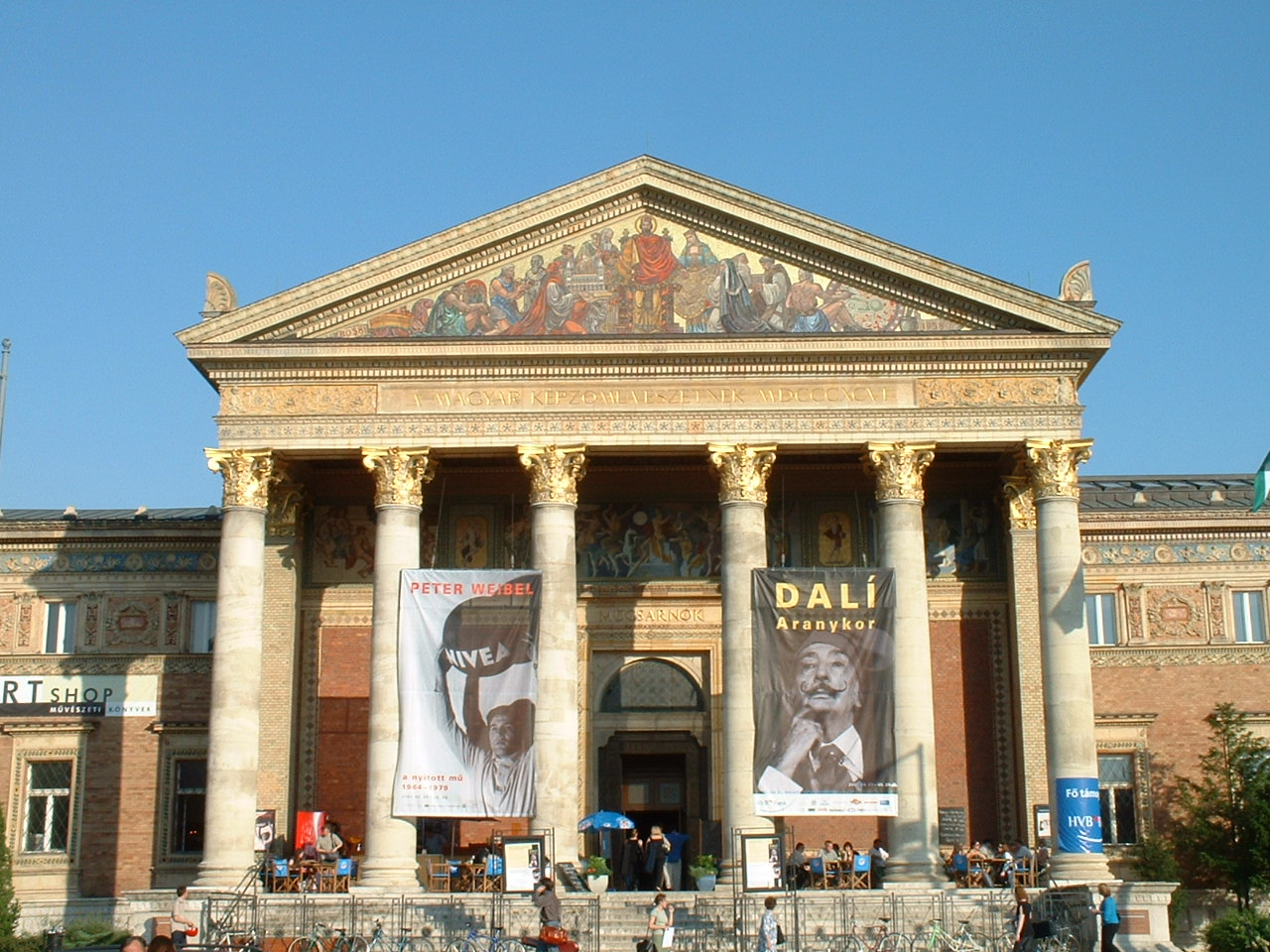
Greek Revival style portico, with main entrance.

The Budapest Hall of Art or Palace of Art, (Hungarian − Műcsarnok Kunsthalle), is a contemporary art museum and a historic building located in Budapest, Hungary.

== Description ==
The museum building is on Heroes' Square, facing the Budapest Museum of Fine Arts.

The art museum hosts temporary exhibitions of contemporary art. It operates on the program of German Kunsthalles, as an institution run by artists that does not maintain its own collection. It is an Institution of the Hungarian Academy of Arts. It is the largest exhibition space for contemporary visual art in Hungary.

It has a bookshop, library, and the Műcsarnok Café that overlooks the square.

=== Building ===
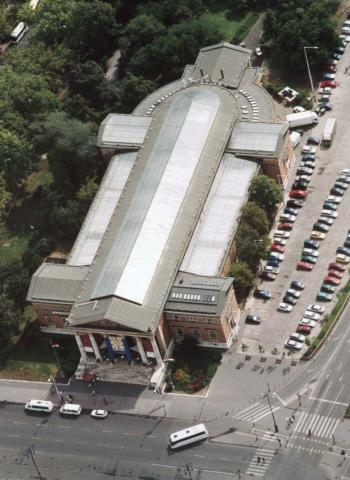
Aerial view of roof & site plan.

The Műcsarnok was founded in 1877 on the initiative of the Hungarian National Fine Arts Association. Its first building, at 69–71 Andrássy Avenue, now houses the Hungarian University of Fine Arts.

The present large Neoclassical style structure, designed by architects Albert Schickedanz and Fülöp Herczog, was completed in 1896. It was built for Hungary's millennium celebrations.

Its portico is in the Greek Revival style. The three-bayed, semi-circular apse houses a roofed exhibition hall with skylights. The building was renovated in 1995.
