= Zsigmond Kisfaludi Strobl =

Hungarian sculptor and artist

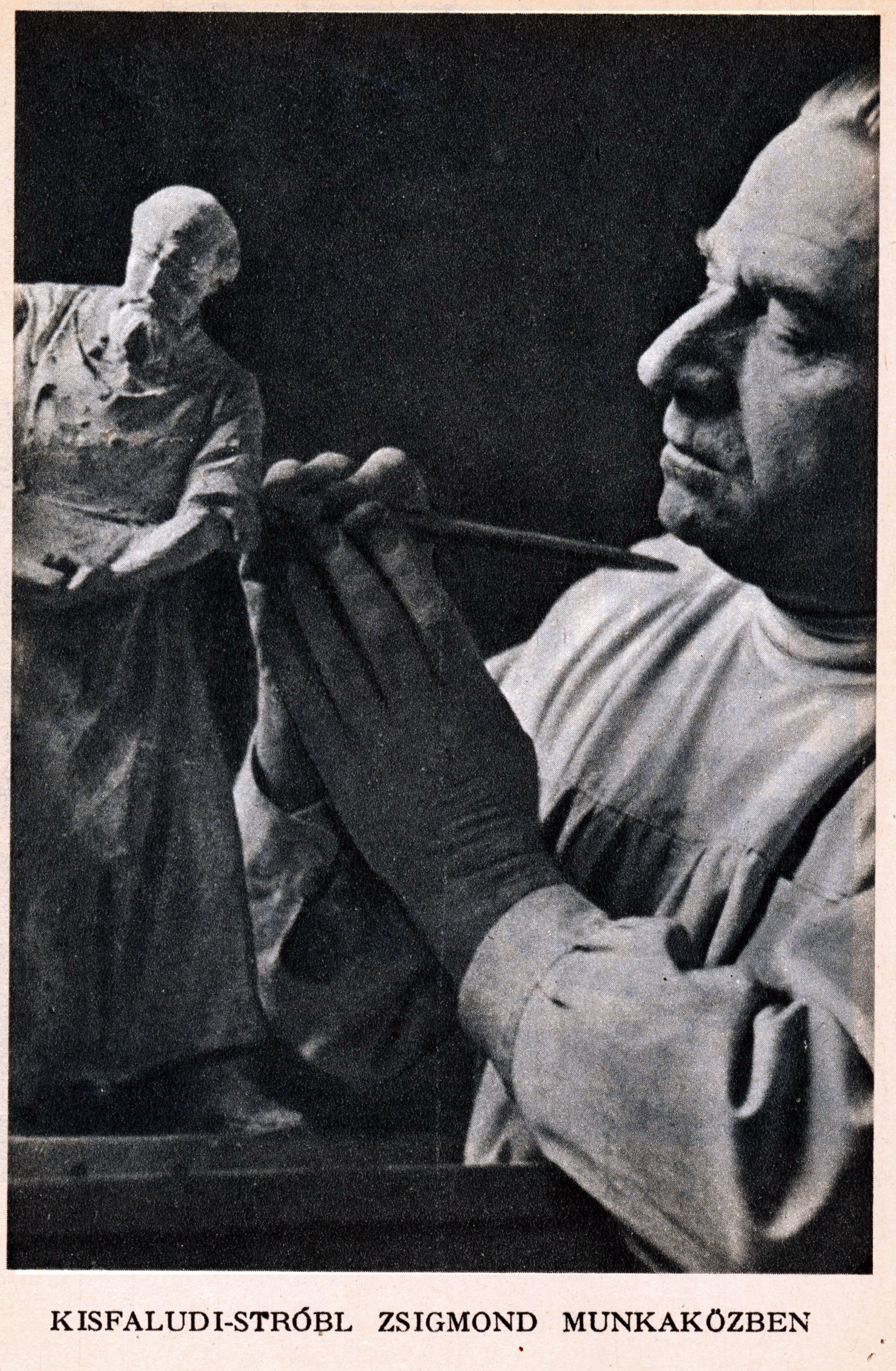
- Born: 1 July 1884; Alsórajk, Austria-Hungary
- Died: 14 August 1975 (aged 91); Budapest, Hungarian People's Republic
- Occupation: Sculpture
- Known for: Monumental public sculptures

Zsigmond Kisfaludi Strobl (1 July 1884 – 14 August 1975) was a Hungarian sculptor and artist. His sculptural style integrated elements of realism and academism style mainly engaged in creating portrait busts.

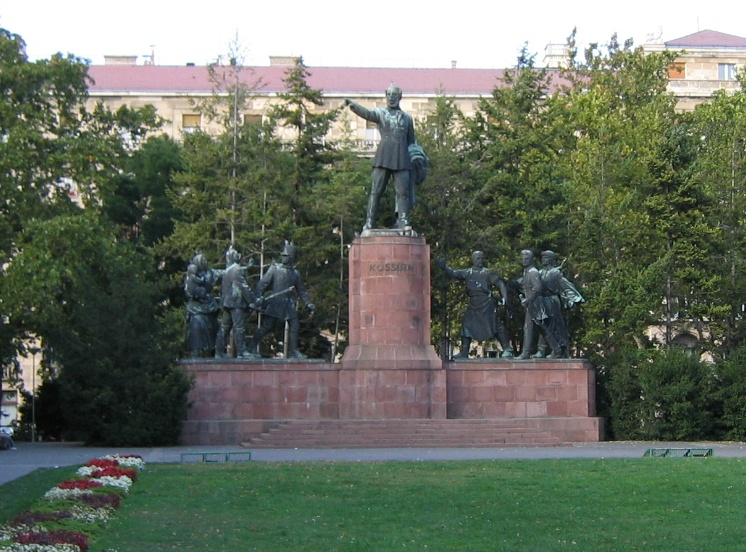
The Kossuth Memorial near the Hungarian Parliament
