= Kossuth Memorial =

Monument dedicated to Lajos Kossuth in Budapest, Hungary

Coordinates: 47°30′29.35″N 19°2′50.18″E

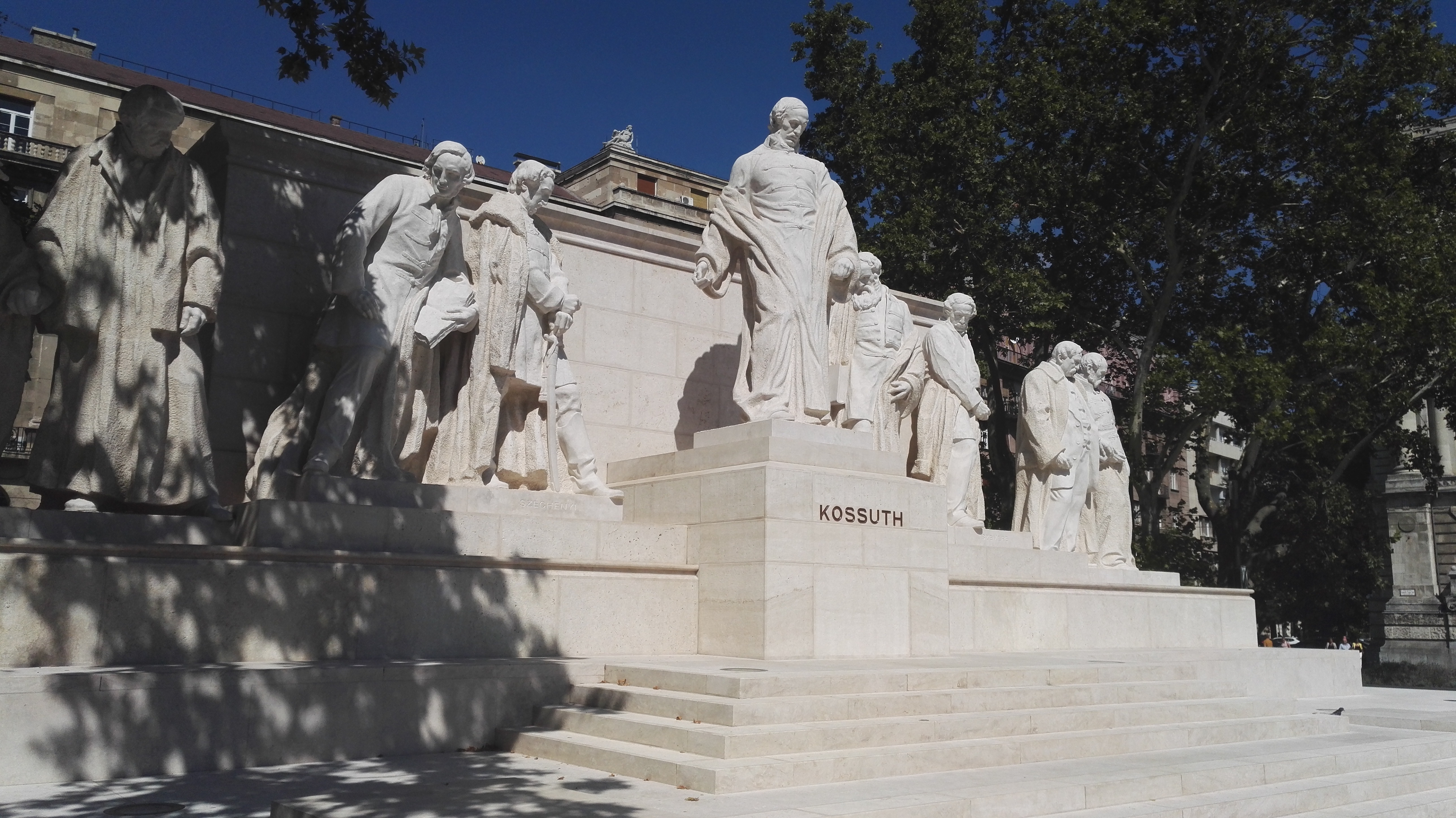
Kossuth Memorial near the Hungarian Parliament

Kossuth Memorial refers to one of three public monuments dedicated to former Hungarian Regent-President Lajos Kossuth in front of the Hungarian Parliament Building on Lajos Kossuth Square in Budapest. The memorial is an important Hungarian national symbol and scene of official celebrations.

== First memorial ==
After the death of Lajos Kossuth (March 21, 1894) and his sumptuous funeral in Budapest, a public subscription was almost immediately announced to build a memorial for the leader of the 1848 Revolution. During the next years 850,000 forints came together, a huge sum in those days. In 1906 the competition was won by János Horvay after long debates about the style and message of the memorial. Although the public was dissatisfied with Horvay’s idea the sculptor began working. By 1914 all the figures of the group were completed except Kossuth himself but then the work came to a halt because of World War I. The colossal Ruskica marble plinth remained in the quarry in Transylvania and was confiscated by the invading Romanian troops. In the years following the war, Horvay completed the Kossuth statue and a new plinth was made of simple limestone.

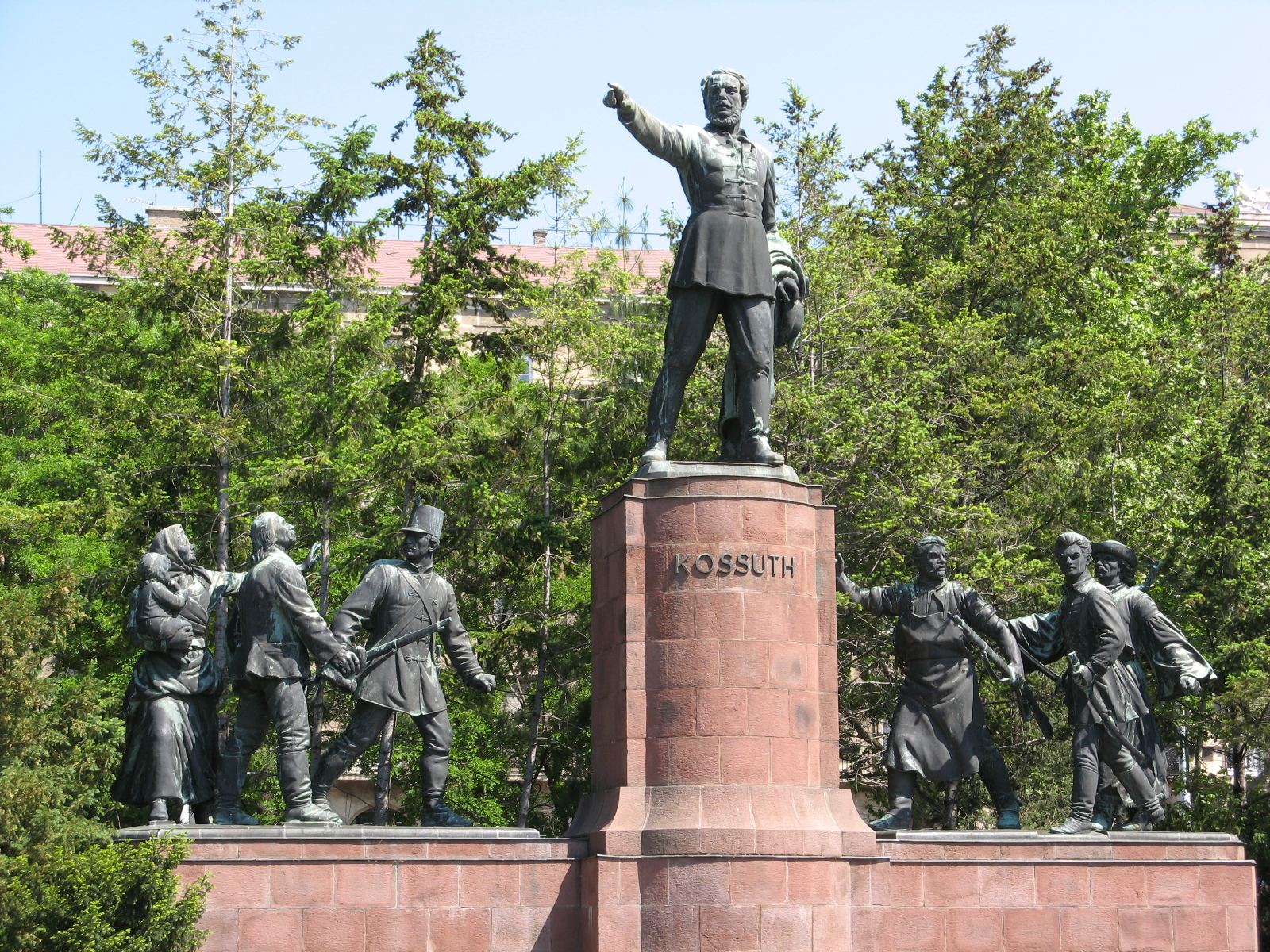
The second Kosuth Memorial (2007)

The first Kossuth Memorial was officially inaugurated on 6 November 1927 by Governor Miklós Horthy before a crowd of 100,000 people. The speaker of the celebration was Albert Apponyi. The group depicted the members of the first Hungarian parliamentary government: Lajos Kossuth (in the middle), Pál Esterházy, Gábor Klauzál, József Eötvös, István Széchenyi, Prime Minister Lajos Batthyány, Bertalan Szemere, Ferenc Deák, and Lázár Mészáros. Horvay’s composition was criticized because Kossuth played only a minor constitutional role in the first cabinet. Art critics condemned the melancholic atmosphere of the memorial and the sculpture remained somewhat unpopular.

== Second memorial ==
In 1950, the government of Mátyás Rákosi, Stalinist dictator of Hungary, ordered the dismantling of the "pessimistic" memorial. Zsigmond Kisfaludi Strobl made a new bronze statue of Kossuth pointing towards a brighter future with a raised hand. Although the sculpture is a typical product of its age, Kisfaludi Strobl was a talented artist who managed to picture Kossuth as a great orator. The new memorial was inaugurated in 1952. The six other figures (among them poet Sándor Petőfi) were made by András Kocsis and Lajos Ungváry. The plinth was clad with red marble blocks.

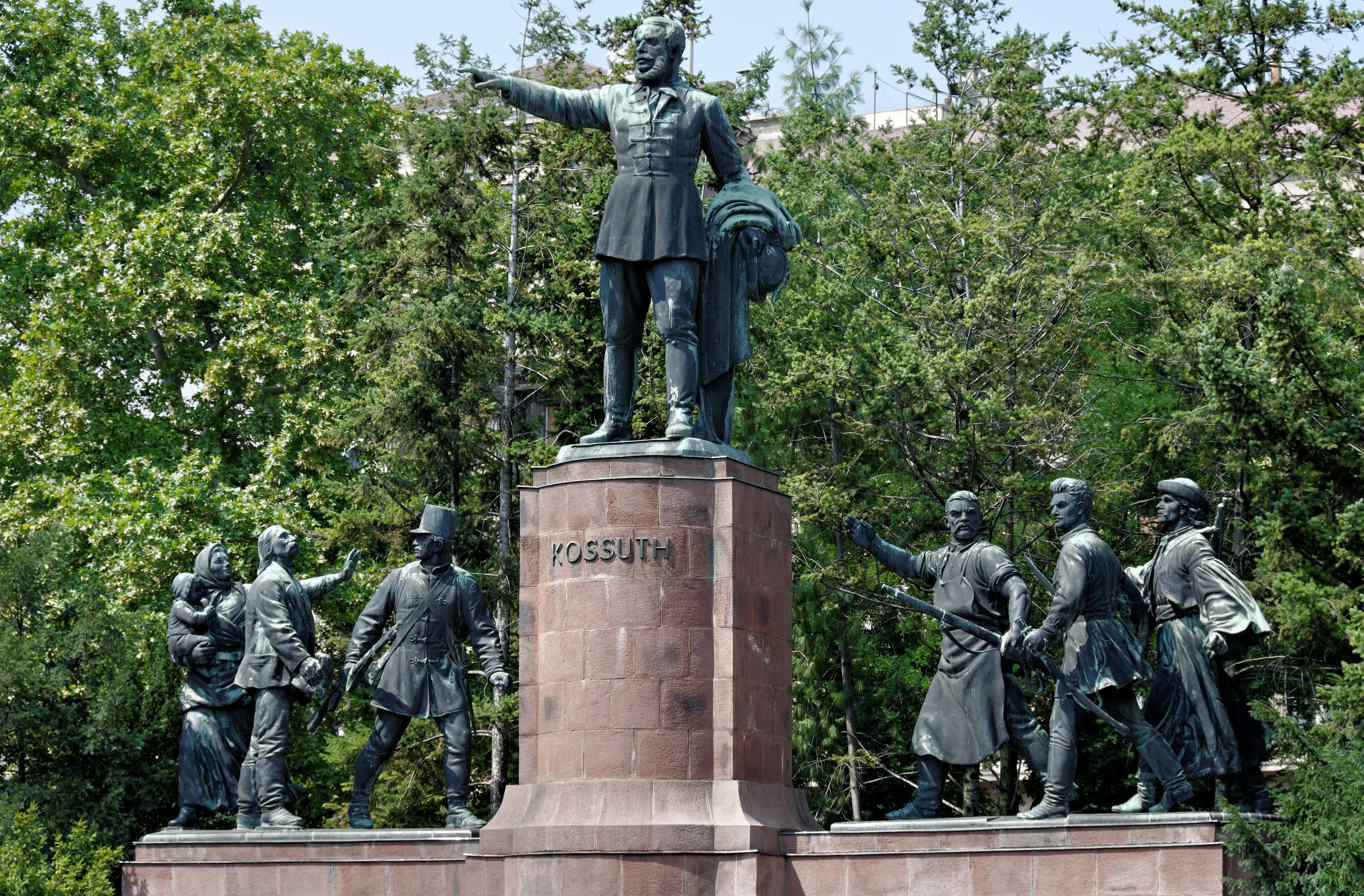
The second Kossuth Memorial (2011)

The dismantled Horvay-group was given to the town of Dombóvár in 1959 where the figures were separately re-erected in 1973 in the City Park.

== Third memorial ==
The Hungarian government launched the overall rehabilitation of Kossuth Lajos Square in 2012 after a long period of planning. A parliamentary decision ordered the reconstruction of the historical sculptures of the square as they appeared in 1944. Strobl's Kossuth Memorial was deconstructed, then reassembled in Orczy Park in a different formation. An exact copy of the original sculpture group by Horvay (preserved in Dombóvár) was recreated and unveiled in Kossuth Square in 2014.
