= János Horvay =

Hungarian sculptor (1874–1944)

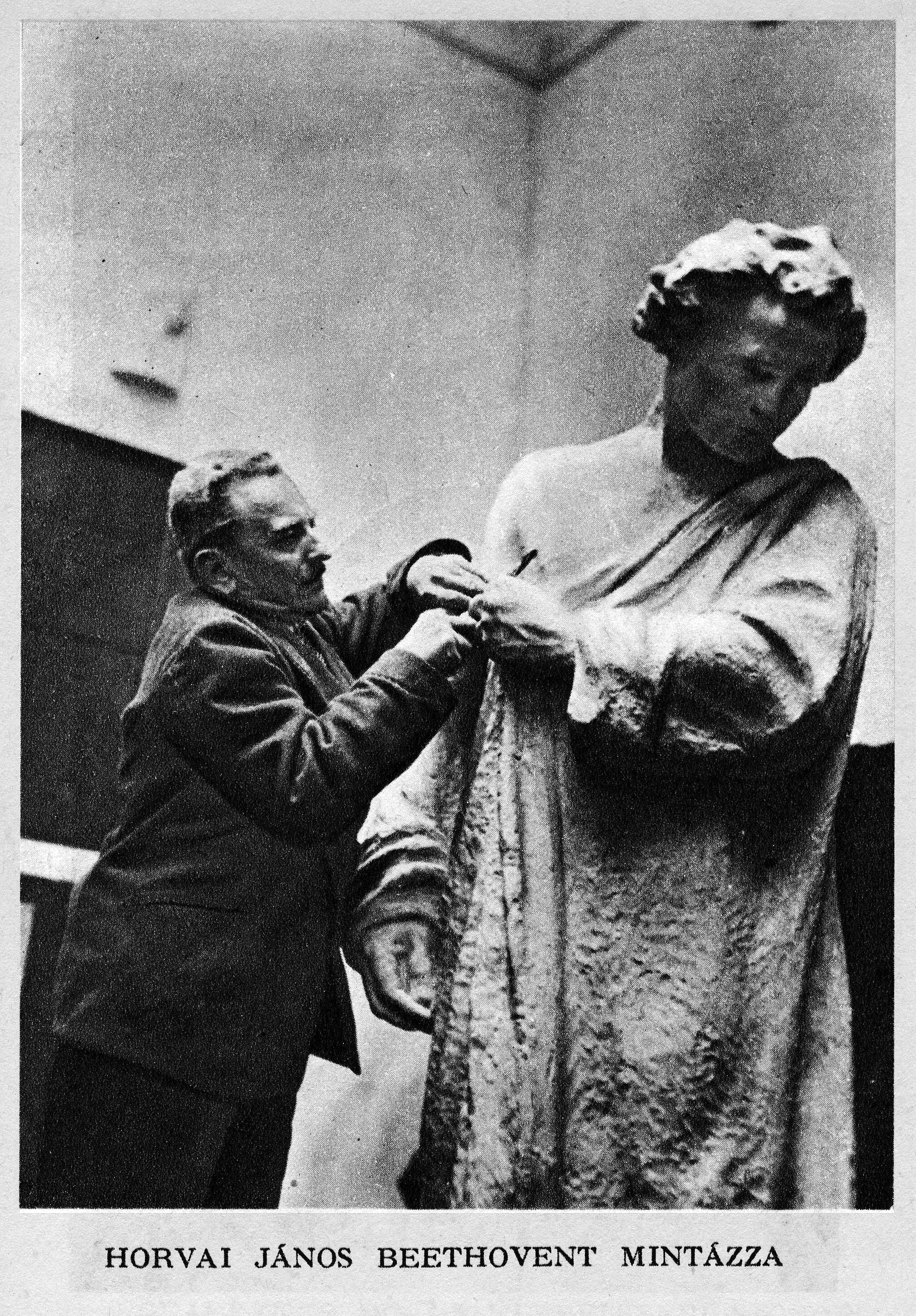
János Horvay in 1938

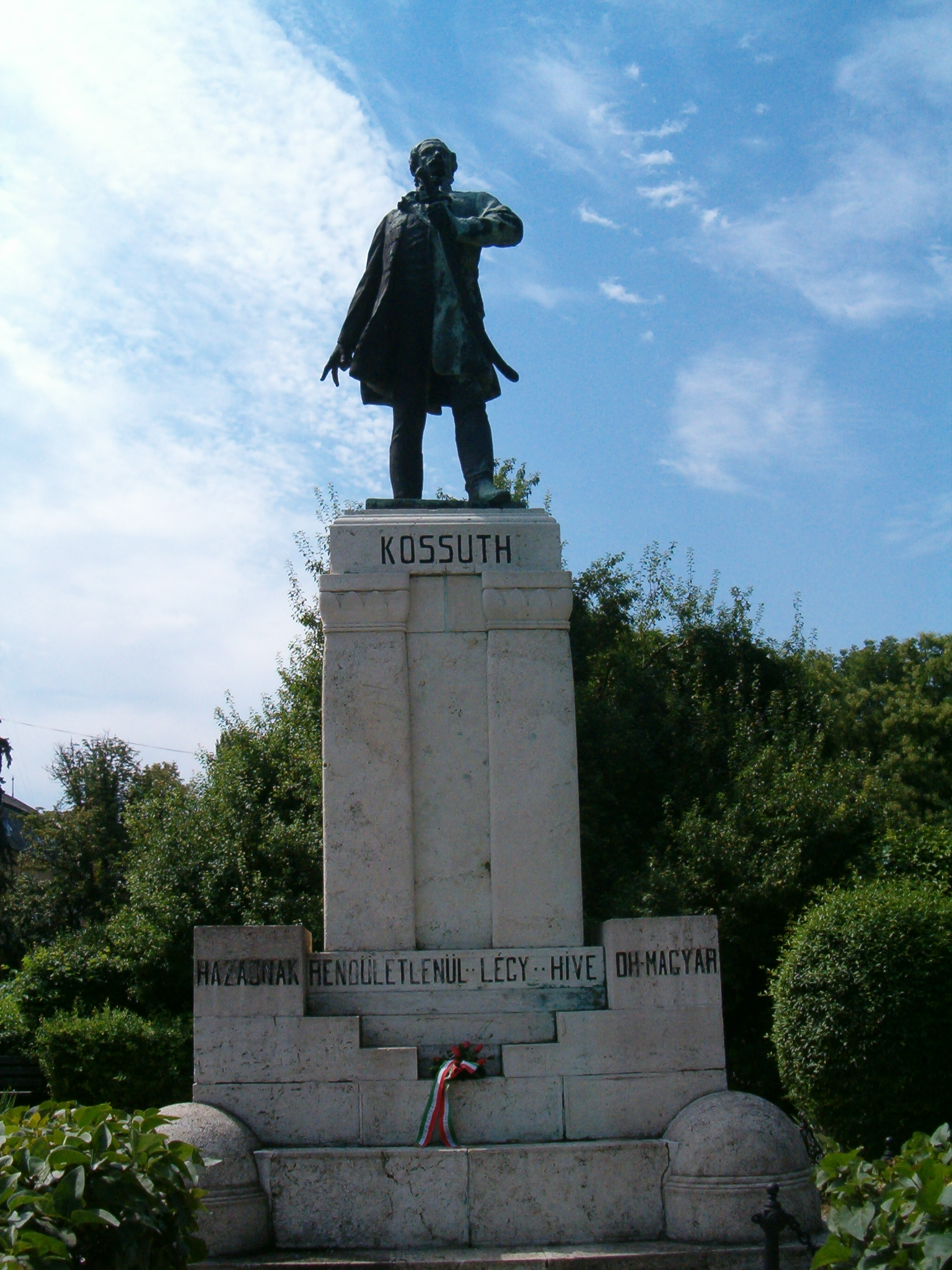
Kossuth Memorial in Karcag

János Horvay (May 29, 1874 - November 19, 1944) was a Hungarian sculptor, who earned reputation with his statues about Lajos Kossuth, leader of the Hungarian national uprising in 1848–49. However his most important work, the great Kossuth Memorial in Budapest proved to be a failure.

Horvay was born on 29 May 1873 in Pécs. Between 1889 and 1895 he was the pupil of the prominent Viennese sculptor, Edmund Hellmer. After 1897 he lived in Budapest. Horvay made several trips in Paris (1901), Italy (1902) and the United States (1928). He received the gold medal of the National Salon in 1913. Horvay was also a popular artist of funeral works of art.

His first important work was the statue of Lajos Kossuth in Cegléd (1902). The statue later became the model of other Kossuth Memorials in Washington and New York. In the same year Horvay made a sculpture for his hometown about Vilmos Zsolnay, the inventor of the famous Zsolnay glazed ceramics.

Horvay won a competition in 1906 with his model for the great Kossuth Memorial in Budapest. The sculpture group depicting the members of the first parliamentary cabinet of Hungary was inaugurated in 1927 after twenty years of work. The memorial was heavily criticised because of its composition and "melancholic" appearance by the press and the public. Later it was demolished in 1950 and the pieces were re-erected separately in Dombóvár.

Other works of Horvay are the Kossuth statue in New York (1928), the memorial of Ottó Herman (1930), statue of Géza Gárdonyi (1932) and Ludwig van Beethoven (1932), and the Memorial of Hungarian Doctors (1942). All the later sculptures are in Budapest.
