= Kossuth Square =

Square in Budapest, Hungary

Kossuth Lajos Square
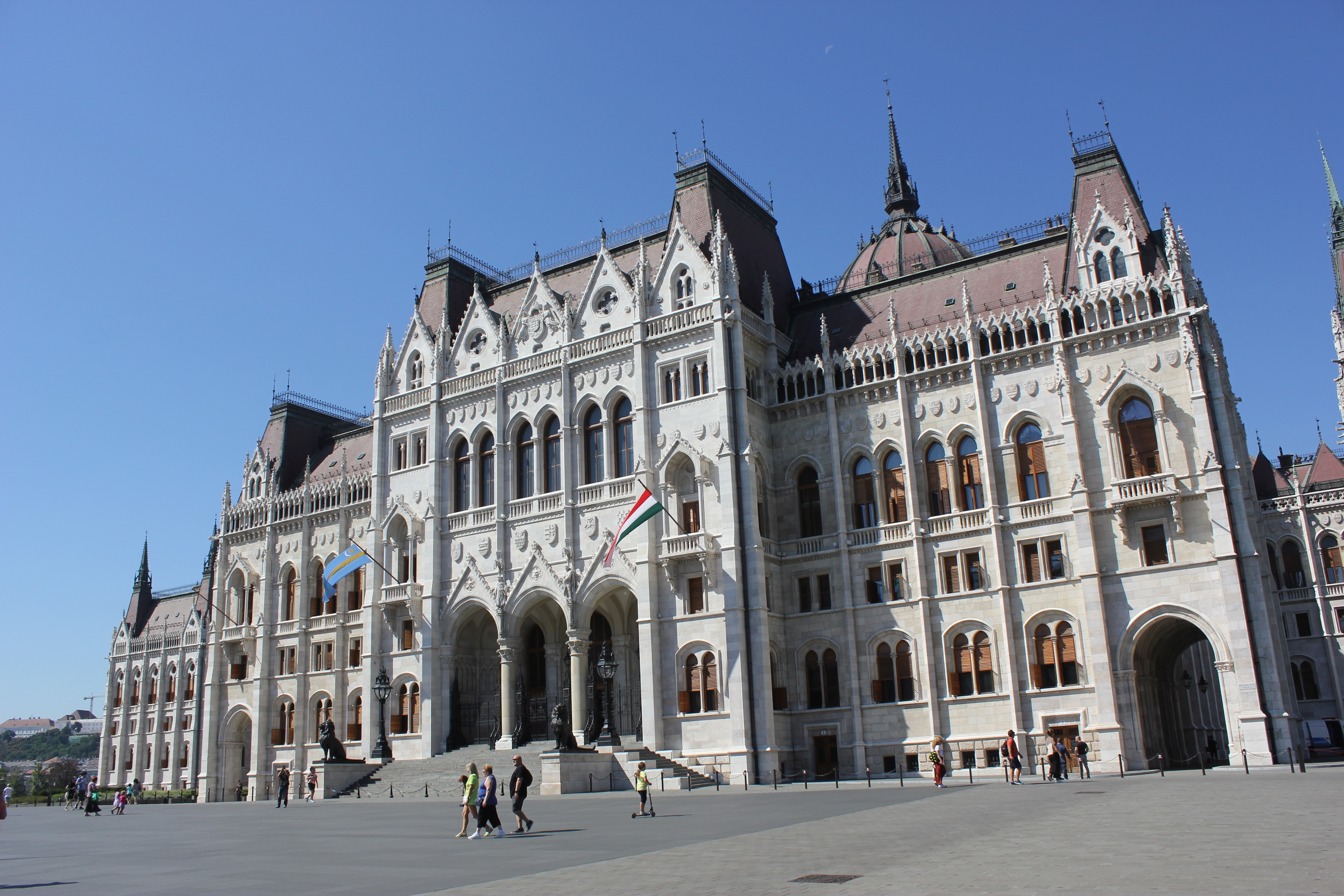

- Location within Budapest
- Native name: Kossuth Lajos tér (Hungarian)
- Namesake: Lajos Kossuth
- Location: Lipótváros, District V of Budapest
- Nearest metro station: Kossuth Lajos tér
- Coordinates: 47°30′25″N 19°2′50″E

Other
- Known for: the Hungarian Parliament Building is located here
- Status: pedestrianised

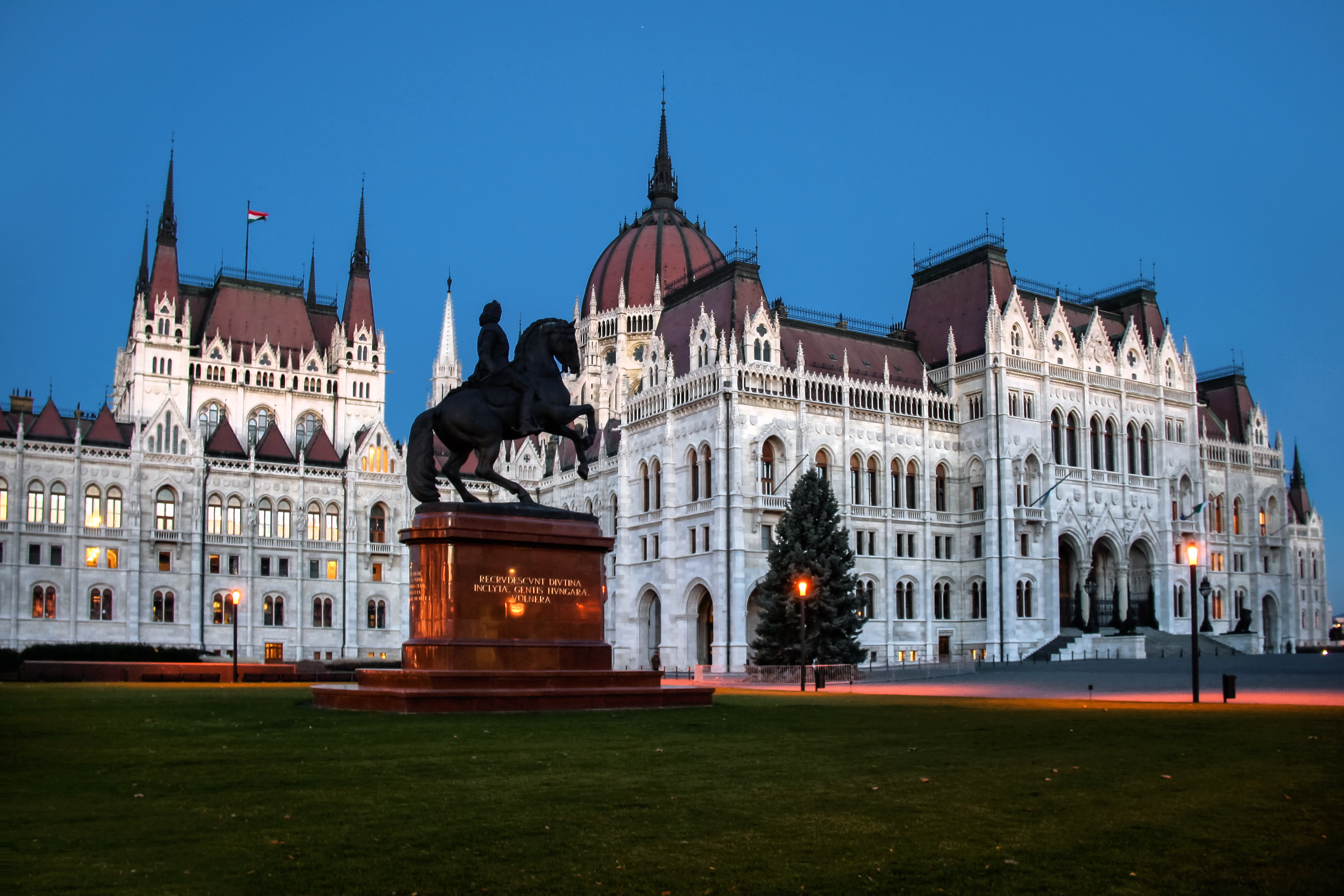
Hungarian Parliament Building in 2016

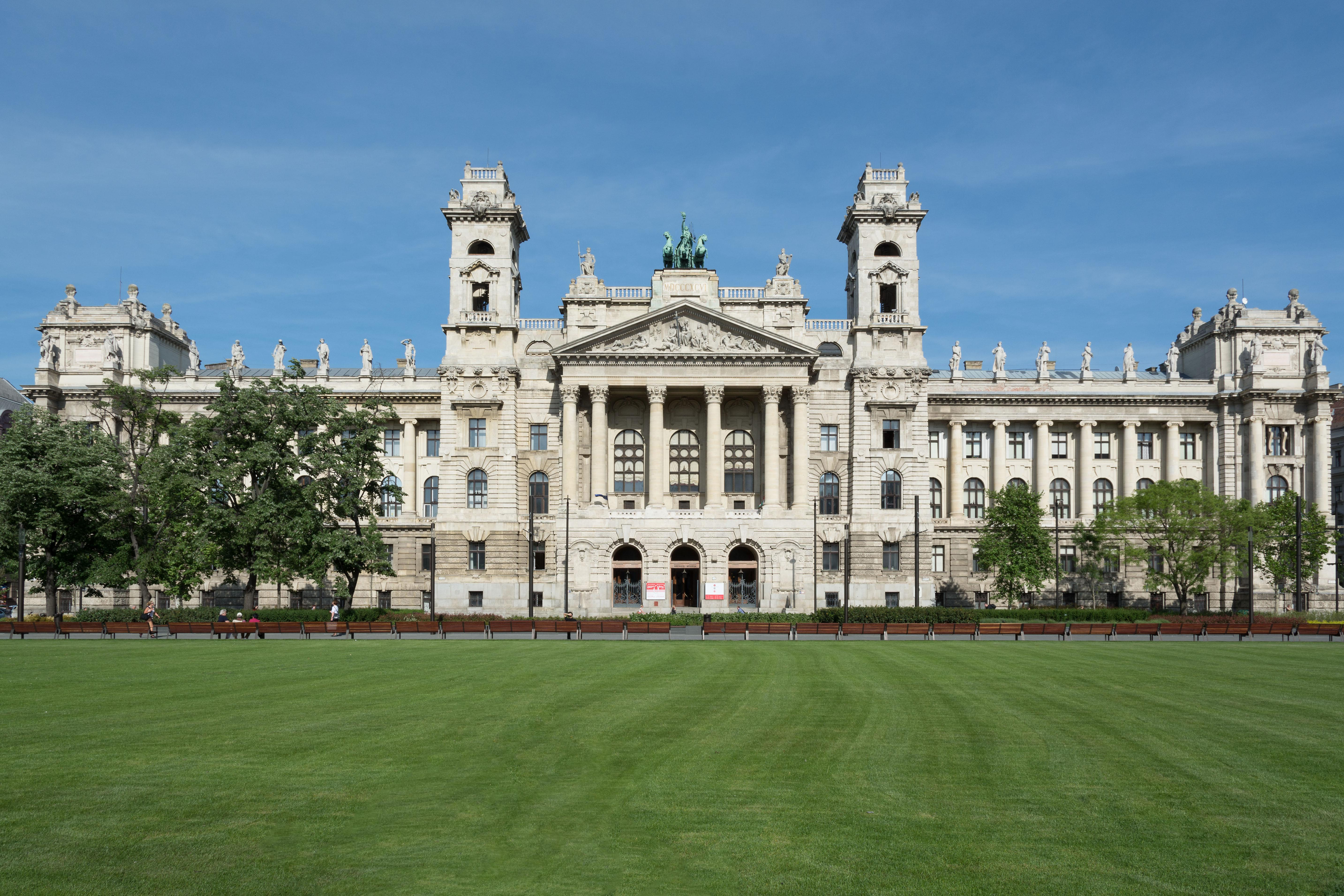
Palace of Justice

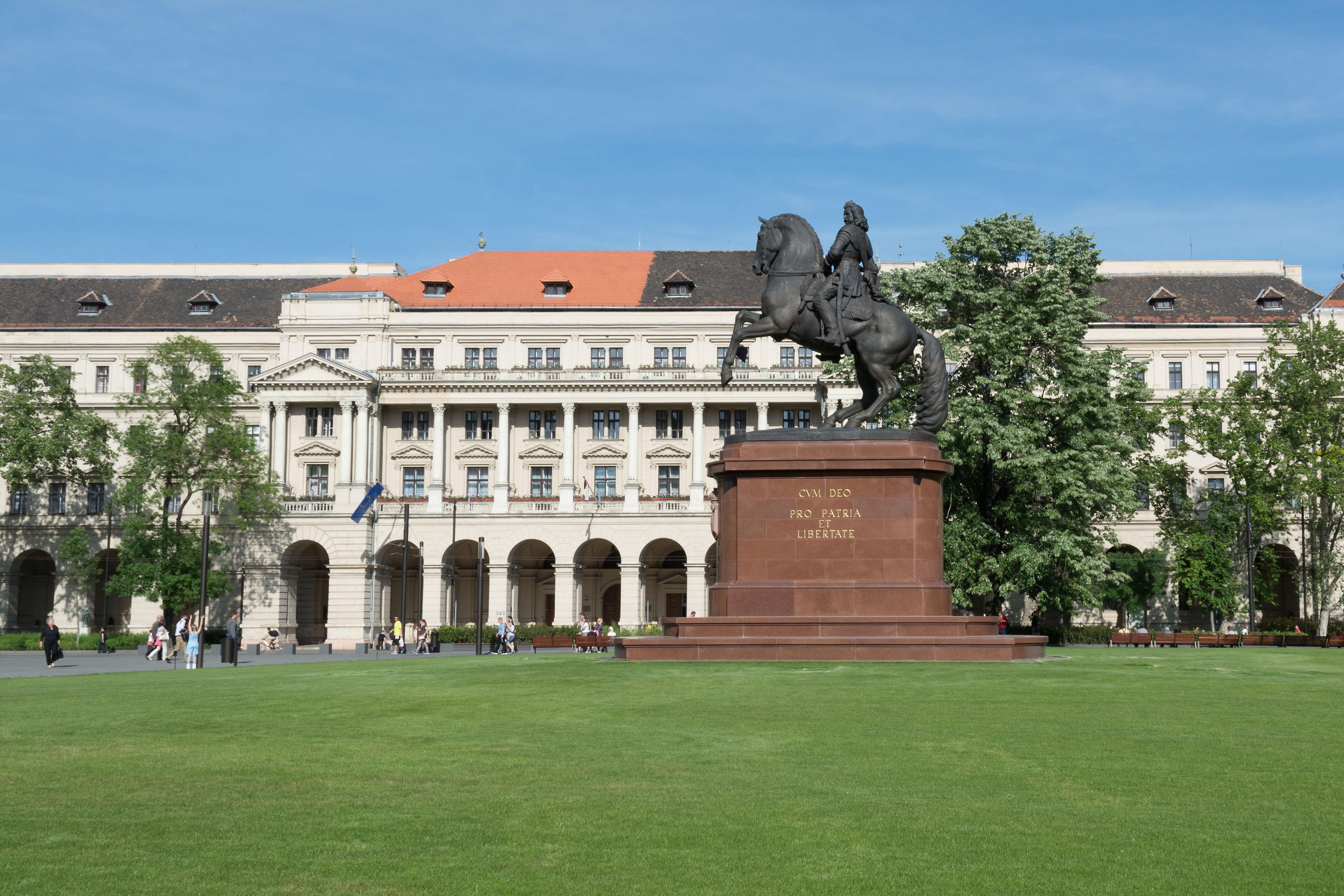
Ministry of Agriculture

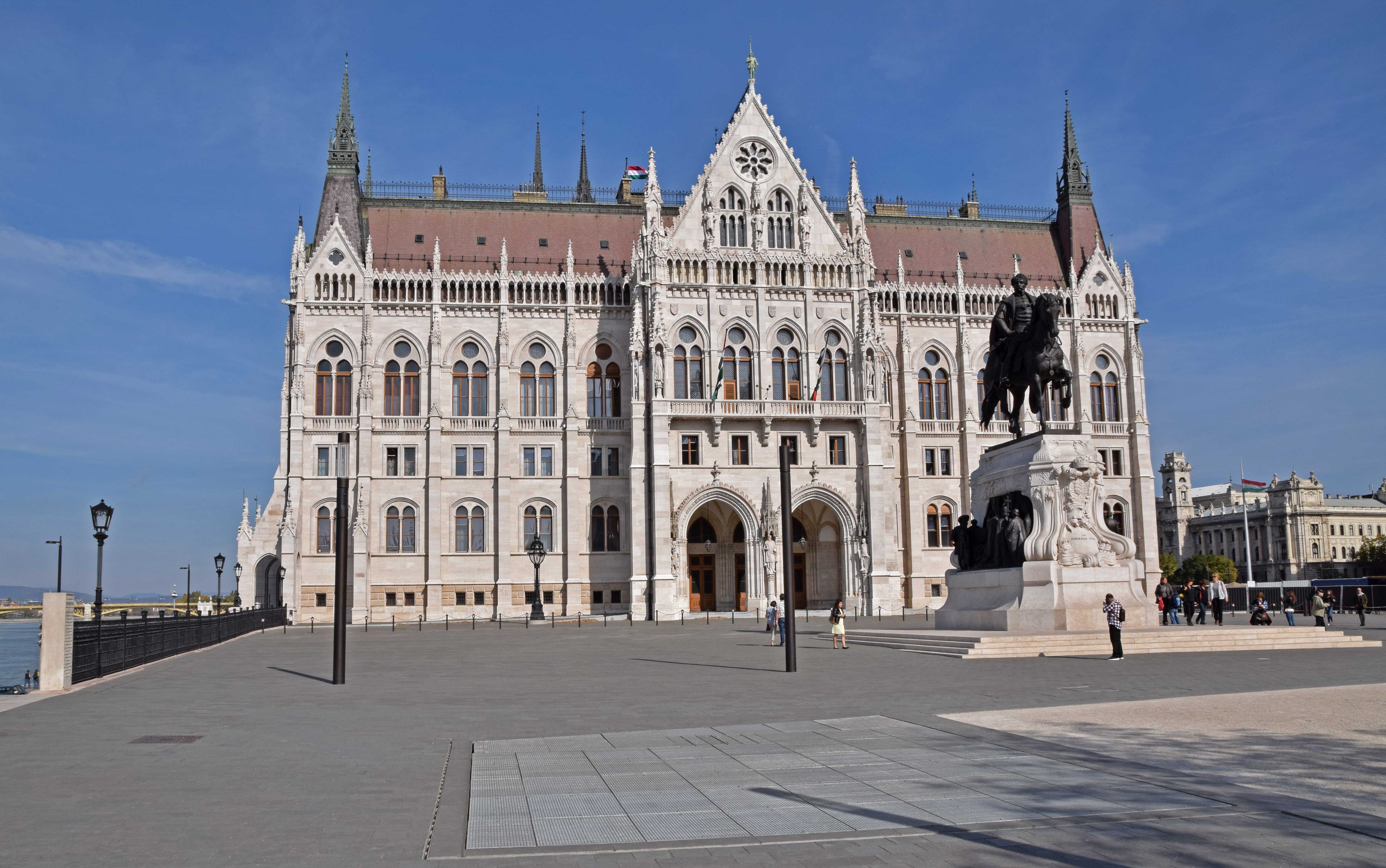
Parliament building seen from the south end of the square

Kossuth Lajos Square (Hungarian: Kossuth Lajos tér, pronounced [ˈkoʃut ˈlɒjoʃ ˈteːr]), also known as Kossuth Square (Kossuth tér [ˈkoʃut ˈteːr]), is a city square situated in the Lipótváros neighbourhood of Budapest, Hungary, on the bank of the Danube. Its most notable landmark is the Hungarian Parliament Building (Országház). There is a station of the M2 (East-West) line of the Budapest Metro on the square as well as a stop for the scenic Tram No. 2.

== Name and history ==
The square, renamed in 1927 in honour of Lajos Kossuth, was previously known by several names including Országház tér ("Parliament Square", 1898–1927) and Tömő tér (Stadt Schopper Platz in German, "Landfill Square", 1853–1898). The latter recalls how the low-lying territory flanking the river, then outside the town of Pest, was filled with rubbish to raise the level of the ground. The first recorded name was Stadtischer Auswind Platz ("Unloading Square for the Ships") in 1820.

In the second half of the 19th century, great public buildings were erected on the square and it became a symbolic centre of Hungarian state institutions, with the Hungarian Parliament Building located on the square opposite the Palace of Justice and the Ministry of Agriculture Building.

After World War II, a temporary bridge across the Danube, Kossuth híd, was built between Lajos Kossuth Square and Batthyány Square, and functioned from 1946 until 1960. It was dismantled when most of the permanent bridges were re-built. It is marked with memorial stones on the Pest and the Buda sides. In its place, a pontoon bridge was built in 1973 and in 2003, for a few days around national holidays.

From 17 September 2006, Kossuth Square was the scene of anti-government demonstrations against Prime Minister Ferenc Gyurcsány, triggered by the release of Gyurcsány's speech in which he confessed that he had lied to win the 2006 elections. Until 23 October, the square was continuously occupied by the demonstrators.

After the 23 October riots, the police closed off the square with cordons. The cordons were removed only on 19 March 2007, with the long closure causing controversy. The damaged park was subsequently restored and the square was given back to the public.

The square was closed again in 2012 by a decision of the Parliament in order to restore its original, pre-1944 view, reopening in 2014 as a traffic-free zone with a sustainable park, updated tracks for tram No. 2, an underground parking garage, sculptures, and a memorial to the victims of the Kossuth Tér massacre on 25 October 1956.

== Memorials ==
In front of the Parliament building are the Kossuth Memorial and an equestrian statue of Francis II Rákóczi, as well as a memorial for the 1956 Hungarian Revolution. A modern statue of Attila József is nearby, south of the Parliament, sitting on a grassy mound overlooking the river as described in his poem By the Danube. There are reconstructed memorials of Count István Tisza and Count Gyula Andrássy on both side of the Hungarian Parliament Building. On 28 December 2018, the statue of Imre Nagy, inaugurated in 1996 was removed from the square to Jászai Mari Square, in order to make way to reconstruct the Monument to the National Martyrs, that had stood on location from 1934 to 1945.

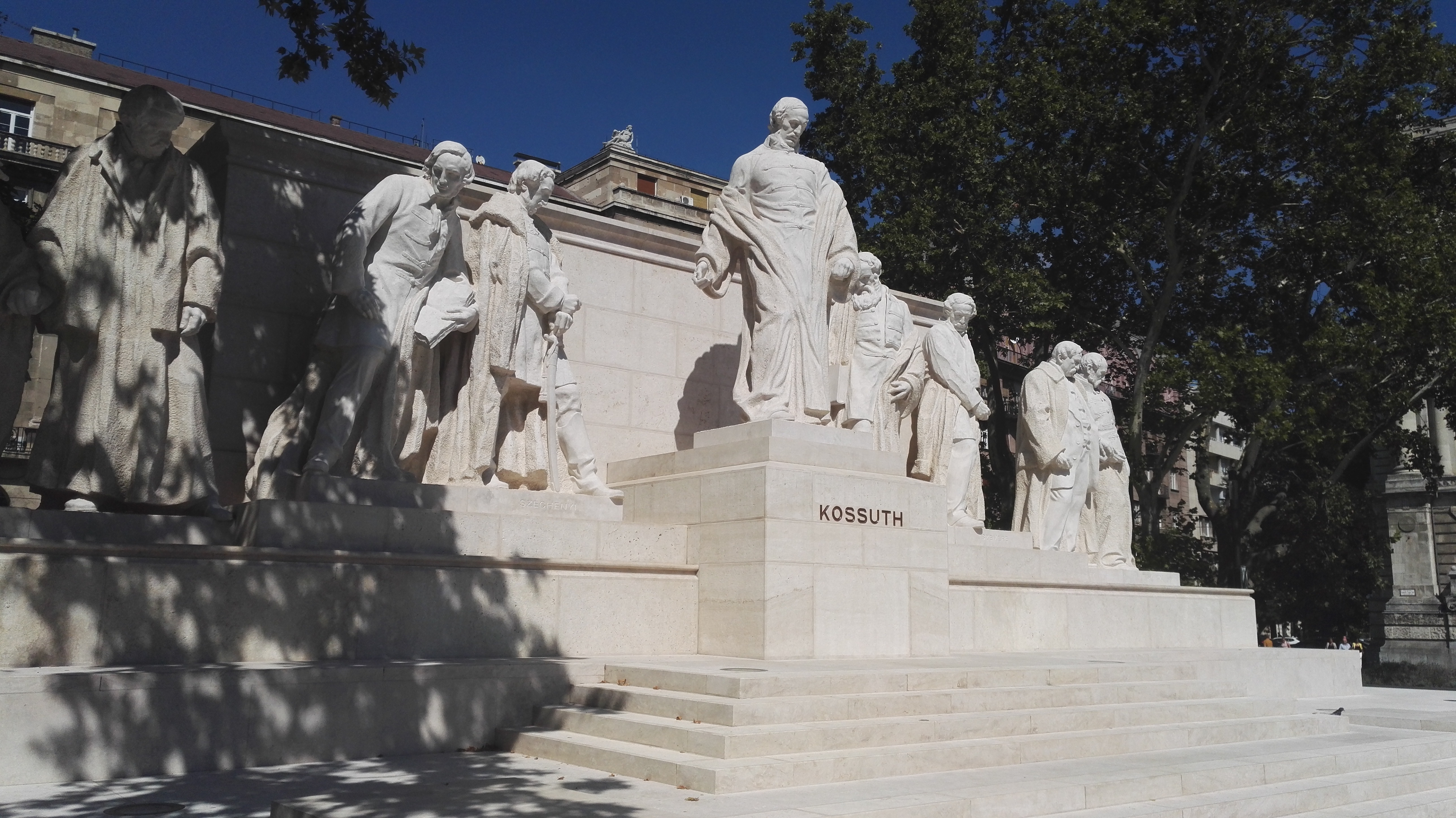
Kossuth Memorial

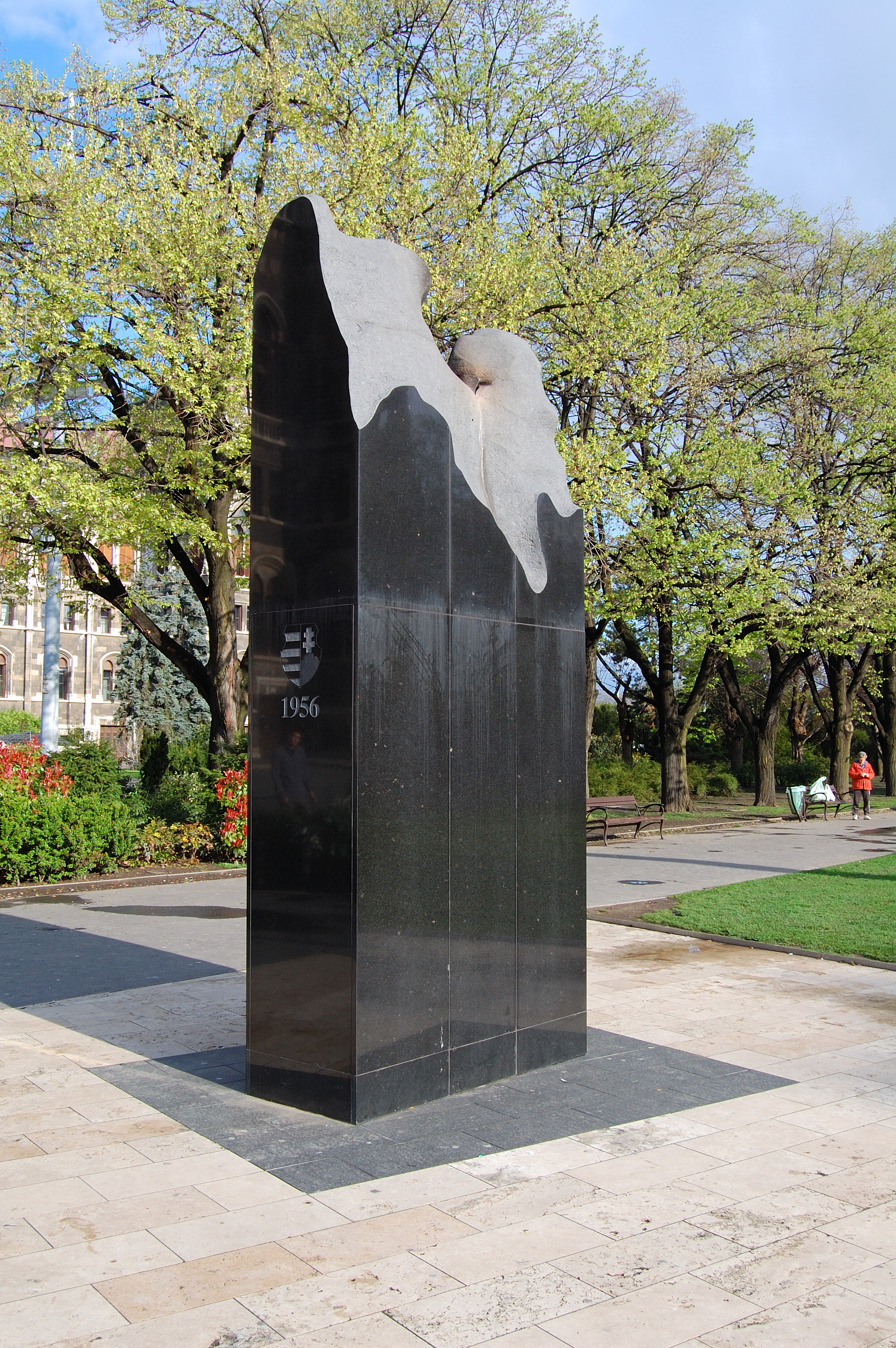
A memorial of the 1956 revolution

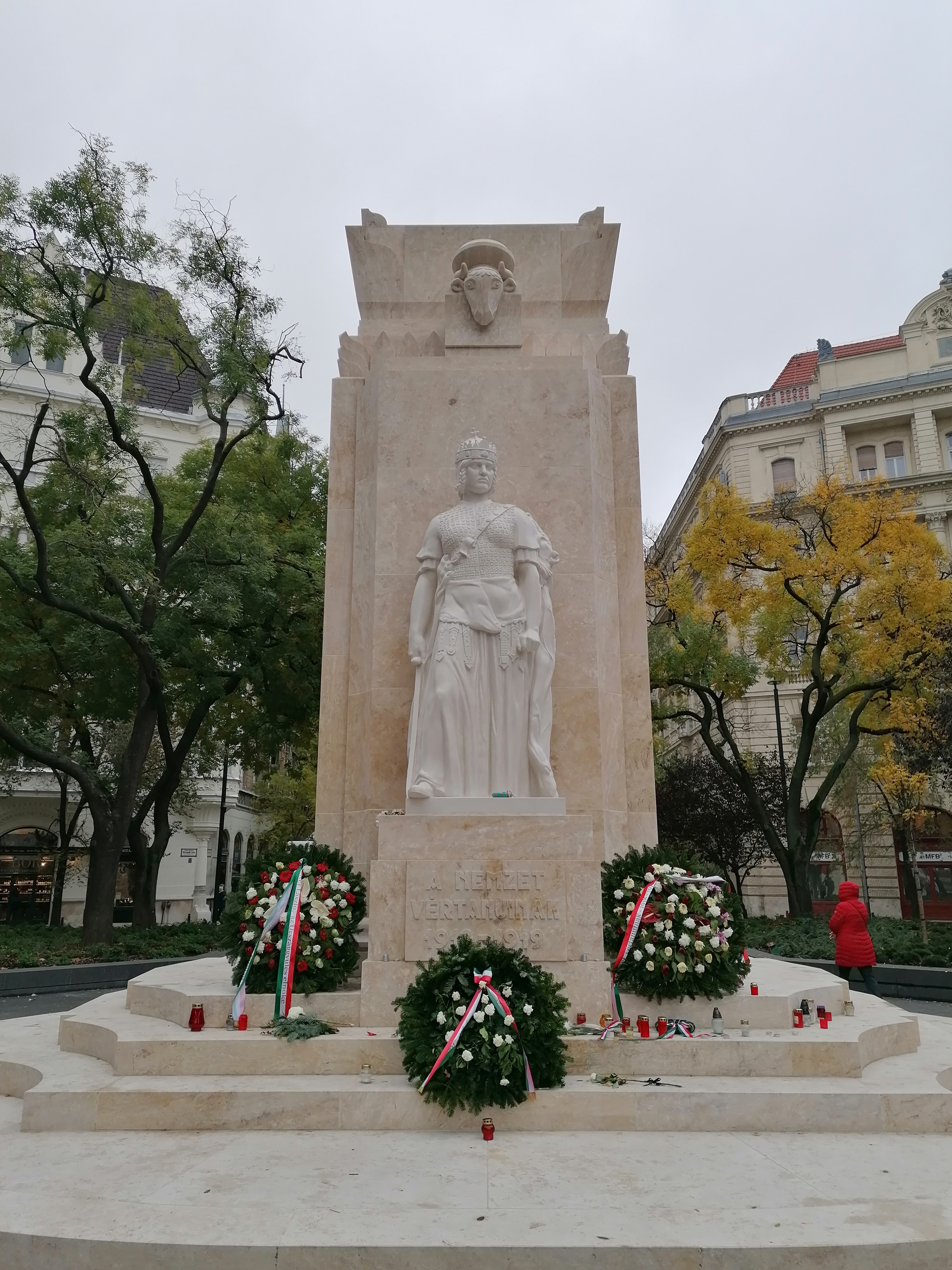
Monument to the National Martyrs

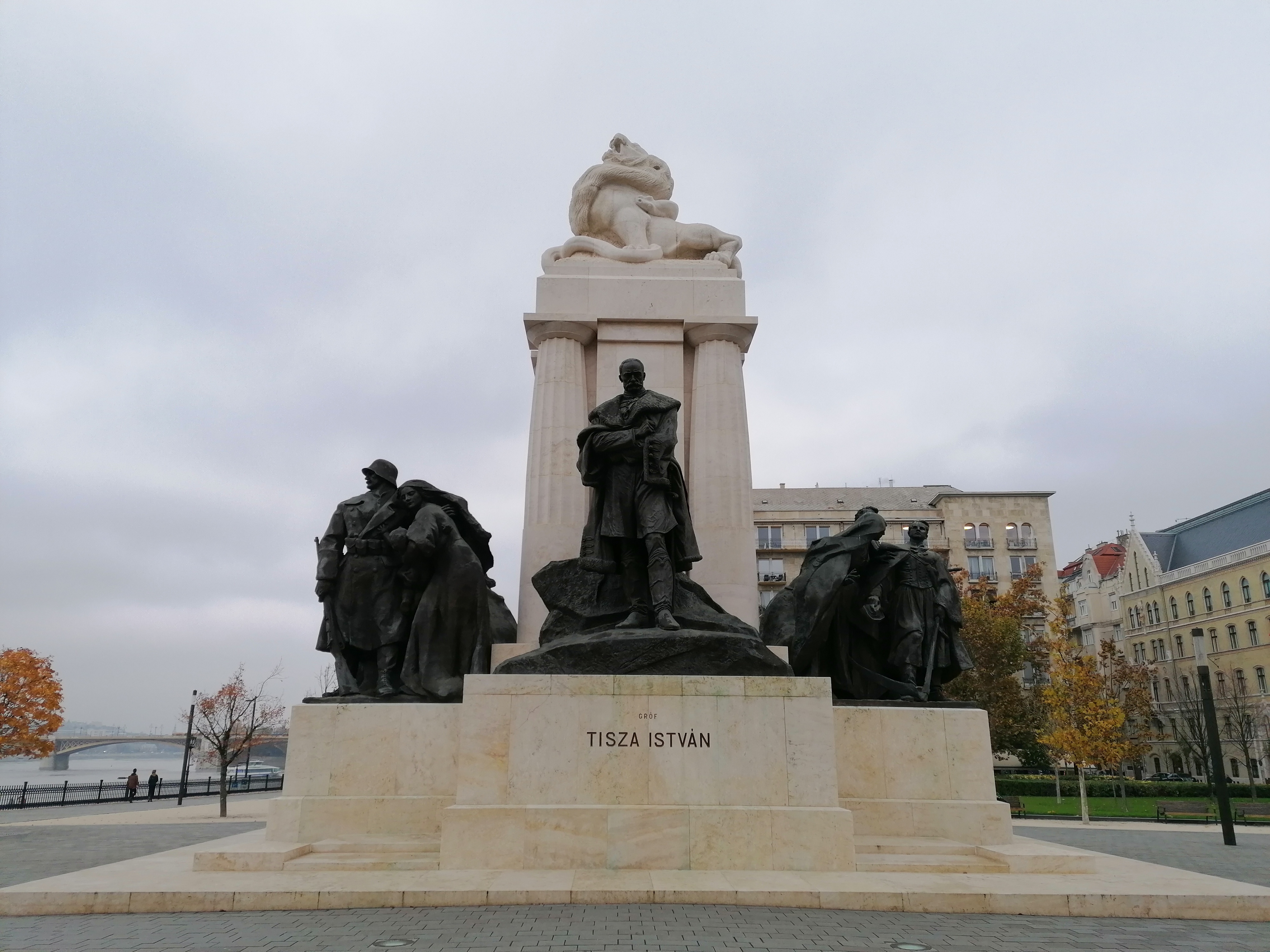
Monument of Count István Tisza

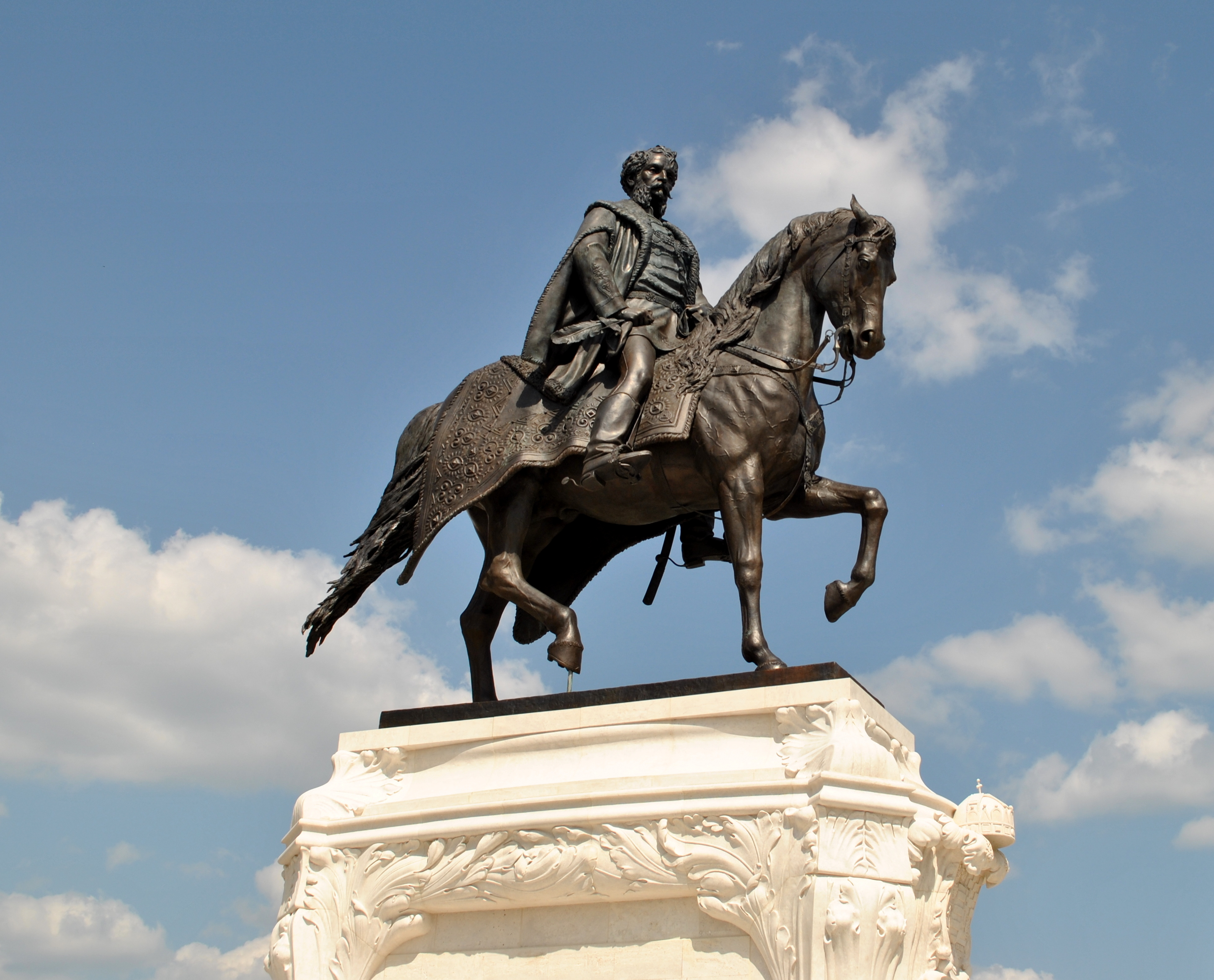
Monument of Count Gyula Andrássy

=== The Kossuth Tér Massacre Memorial ===
A memorial to the victims of the 25 October 1956 massacre at Kossuth tér was created in the southern ventilation tunnel as part of the 2012-14 reconstruction of the square. The memorial remembers the unarmed victims who gathered on "Bloody Thursday" as part of the 1956 Hungarian Revolution with videos, photos, candles, and memorabilia of the era. Little information is certain about this massacre, from who fired the first shot and why, to how the protesters were led to gather in that location on that day, to the death toll of the event. Sources cite as few as 22 shot dead up to as many as 1000. British officials cite the number as being between 300 and 800. The memorial asks anyone with information on the massacre to report it to officials to help complete the story.
