= Hungarian Parliament Building =

Seat of the National Assembly of Hungary

- Országház
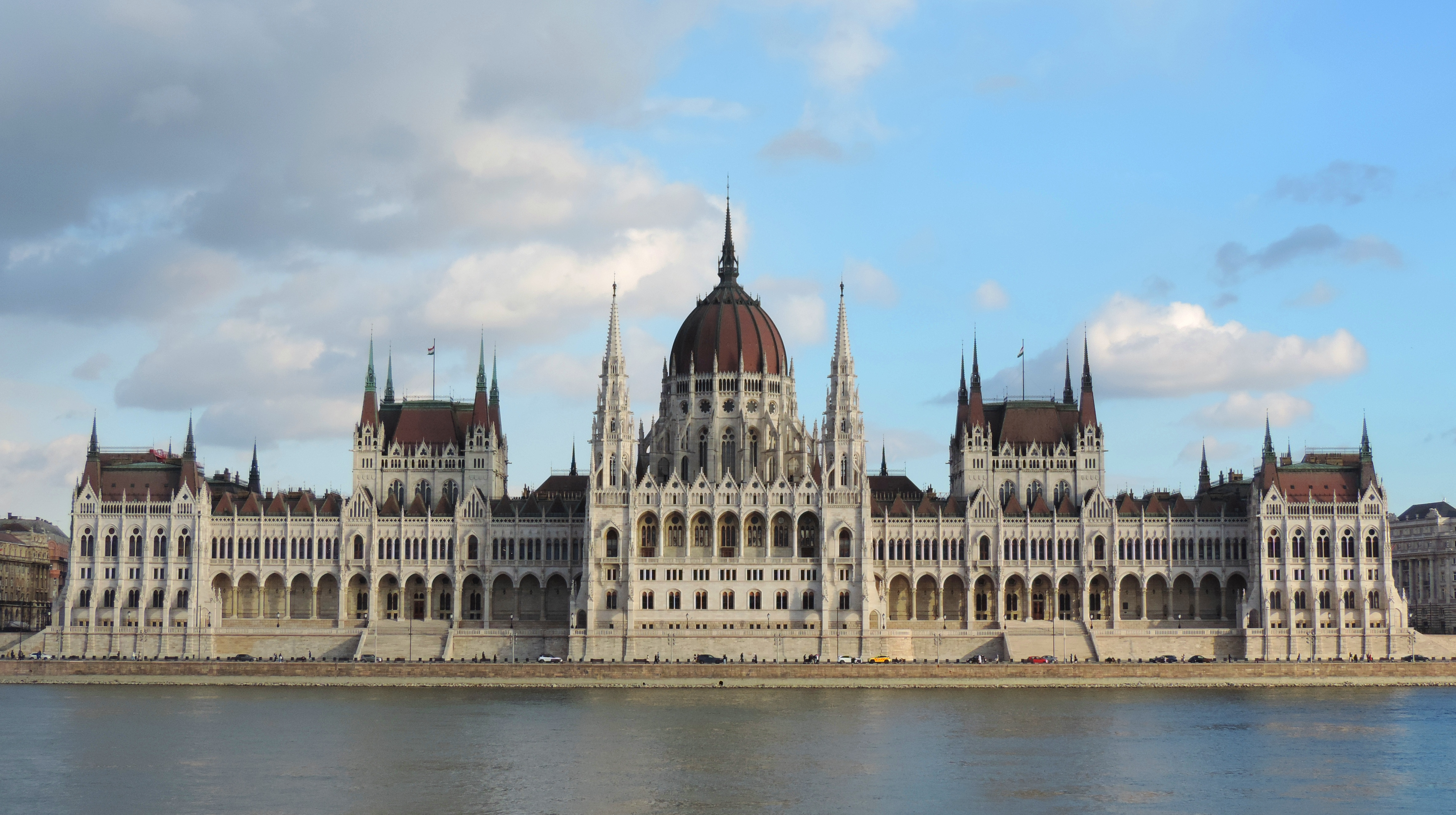
- The main façade as seen from the Danube

General information
- Type: Parliament
- Architectural style: Gothic Revival
- Location: Budapest, Hungary
- Coordinates: 47°30′25″N 19°02′44″E
- Current tenants: National Assembly of Hungary
- Construction started: 1885
- Completed: 1904; 122 years ago

Height
- Height: 96 m (315 ft)

Dimensions
- Other dimensions: Width: 123 m (404 ft); Length: 268 m (879 ft)

Technical details
- Floor count: 4
- Floor area: 18,000 m^{2} (193,800 sq ft)
- Lifts/elevators: 13

Design and construction
- Architect: Imre Steindl

Other information
- Number of rooms: 691

Website
- latogatokozpont.parlament.hu

UNESCO World Heritage Site

UNESCO World Heritage Site
- Official name: Budapest, including the Banks of the Danube, the Buda Castle Quarter and Andrássy Avenue
- Criteria: Cultural: ii, iv
- Reference: 400
- Inscription: 2002 (26th Session)
- Area: 473.3 ha (1,170 acres)
- Buffer zone: 493.8 ha (1,220 acres)

The Hungarian Parliament Building (Hungarian: Országház [ˈorsaːkhaːz], lit. 'House of the Country'), also known as the Parliament of Budapest after its location, is the seat of the National Assembly of Hungary, a notable landmark of Hungary, and a popular tourist destination in Budapest. It is situated on Kossuth Square in the Pest side of the city, on the eastern bank of the Danube. It was designed by Hungarian architect Imre Steindl in neo-Gothic style and opened in 1902. It has been the largest building in Hungary since its completion. The architectural style of the Hungarian parliament building was influenced by the gothic Vienna City Hall, and the renaissance elements like the cupola was influenced by the Maria vom Siege church in Vienna.

== History ==
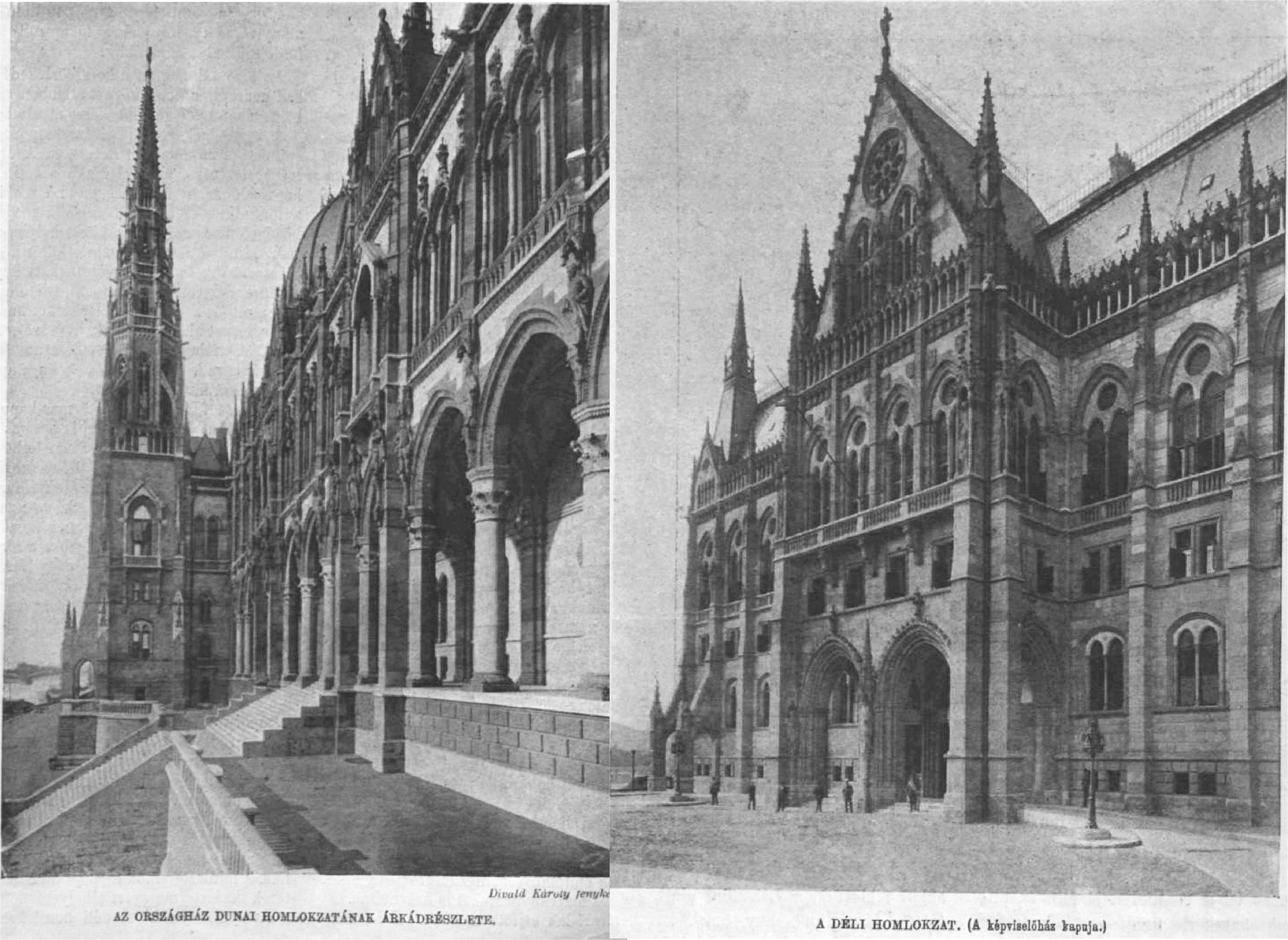
Parliament Building in 1905

Budapest was united from three cities, Buda, Óbuda, and Pest, in 1873. Seven years later, the Diet resolved to establish a new, representative parliament building, expressing the sovereignty of the nation. The building was planned to face the Danube River. An international competition was held, and Imre Steindl emerged as the victor; the plans of two other competitors were later also realized in the form of the Ethnographic Museum and the Hungarian Ministry of Agriculture, both facing the Parliament Building. One reason that Steindl's proposal was chosen is that his neo-Gothic plans bore a strong resemblance with the Palace of Westminster in London. Leading Hungarian politicians of the 19th century found it extremely important that the country's new parliament building should symbolise their commitment to Western Europe, especially Britain, the country Hungarian reformers considered a political role model. Construction from the winning plan was started in 1885, and the building was inaugurated on the presumed 1,000th anniversary of the country in 1896. With the keys to the building being handed over in 1902, it was however not fully completed until 1904, after which 40 million bricks, half a million precious stones and 40 kg (88 lb) of gold were used. The architect of the building first went blind and later died before the building's completion.

Since World War II, the legislature has been unicameral, and today the government uses only a small portion of the building, with the other wing occasionally serving to house events. During the People's Republic of Hungary, a red star was perched on the top of the dome, but it was removed in 1990 after the fall of communism. Mátyás Szűrös declared the Hungarian Republic from the balcony facing Kossuth Lajos Square on 23 October 1989.

== Features ==
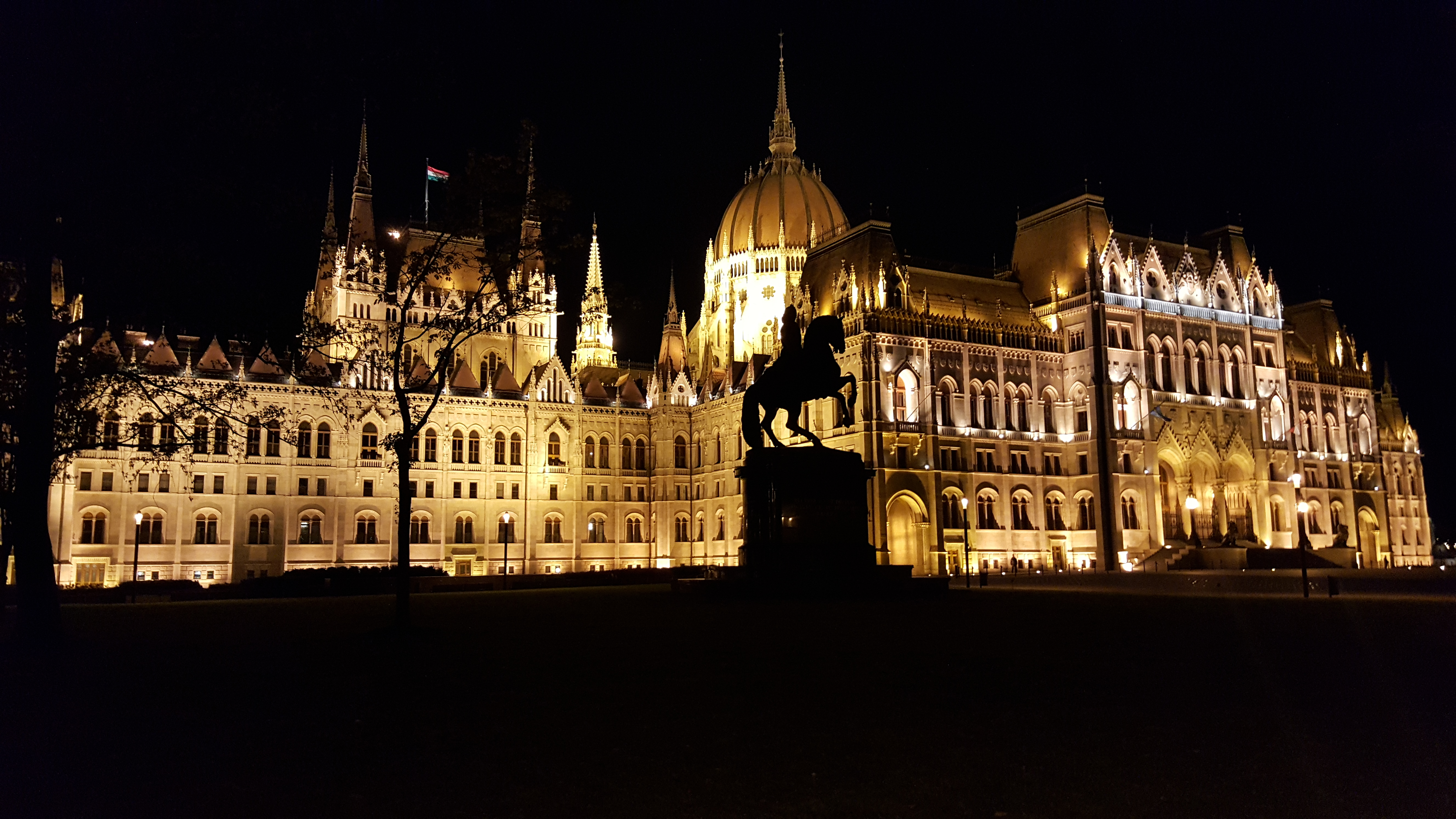
Court yard side of the Budapest Parliament Building at night

The Parliament Building is built in the Gothic Revival style; it has a symmetrical façade and a central dome. The dome is Renaissance Revival architecture. The parliament is also largely symmetrical from the inside, with two identical parliament halls on the opposing sides of the building. One of the two halls is still in use today for sessions of the Hungarian National Assembly, the other for ceremonies, conferences, and guided tours. It is 268 m (879 ft) long and 123 m (404 ft) wide, making it the largest building in the country since its construction. Its interior includes 10 courtyards, 13 passenger and freight elevators, 27 gates, 29 staircases and 691 rooms (which includes more than 200 offices). Its height of 96 m (315 ft) is an allusion to the purported nation's millennium in 1896, with the establishment of the Principality of Hungary in 896 following the Hungarian conquest of the Carpathian Basin. It was one of the two tallest buildings in Budapest, along with Saint Stephen's Basilica, until the MOL Campus topped out in 2021.

The main façade overlooks the Danube, but the official main entrance is from the square on the east side of the building. Inside and outside, there are altogether 242 sculptures on the walls. The façade displays statues of Hungarian rulers, Transylvanian leaders, and famous military figures. The coats of arms of kings and dukes are depicted over the windows. The eastern staircase is flanked by two lions. When entering the Parliament Building, visitors can walk up great ornamental stairs, see frescoes on the ceiling, and pass by the bust of the architect Imre Steindl in a wall niche. Other statues include those of Árpád, Stephen I and John Hunyadi. The building features stained glass and glass mosaics by Miksa Róth.

One of the most famous parts of the building is the hexadecagonal (sixteen-sided) central hall, with huge chambers adjoining it: the Lower House and the Upper House. The modern National Assembly is unicameral and meets in the Lower House, while the Upper House is used as a conference and meeting room. The Holy Crown of Hungary, which is also depicted in Hungary's coat of arms, has been displayed in the central hall since 2000. Due to its extensive surface and detailed handiwork, the building is almost always under renovation.

== Accessibility and neighbourhood ==
The Parliament is accessible via Line 2 of the Budapest Metro and line 2 of the Budapest tram system, from the Kossuth Lajos Square station. At the east front of the building is a memorial to the 1956 Hungarian Revolution, as well as the imposing Kossuth Memorial and the equestrian statue of Francis II Rákóczi. A seated statue of Attila József as described in his poem By the Danube occupies a site on the south lawn. Martyrs' Square (Vértanúk tere) is immediately adjacent to Kossuth Square, with a statue of Imre Nagy.

== Postage stamps ==
The building is featured on more than 50 postage stamps issued by Hungary during 1917–1921, including ones issued in 1917, 1919, 1920, and 1921.

== Gallery ==
=== Exterior ===
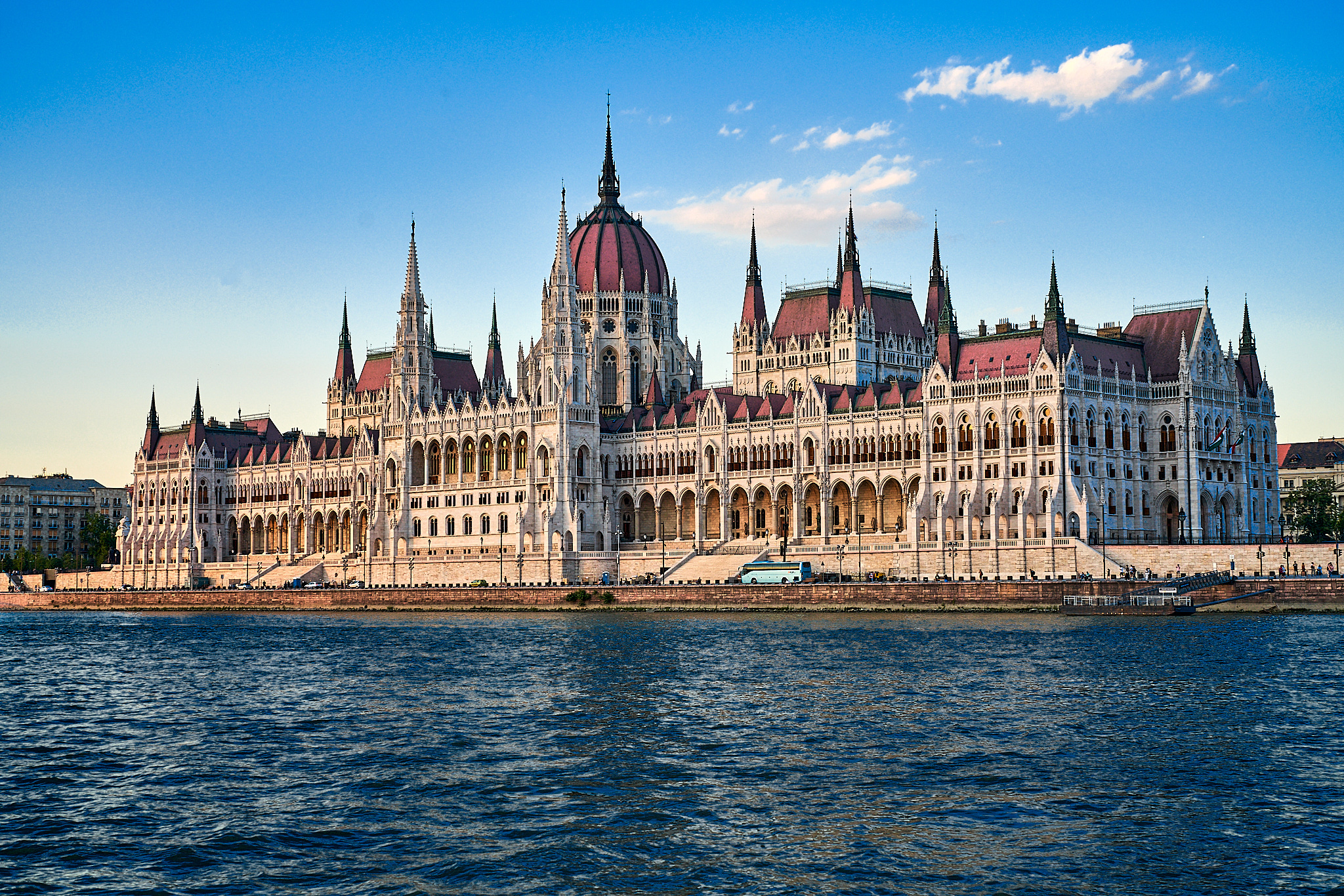
Exterior view in daytime, from a Danube River cruise

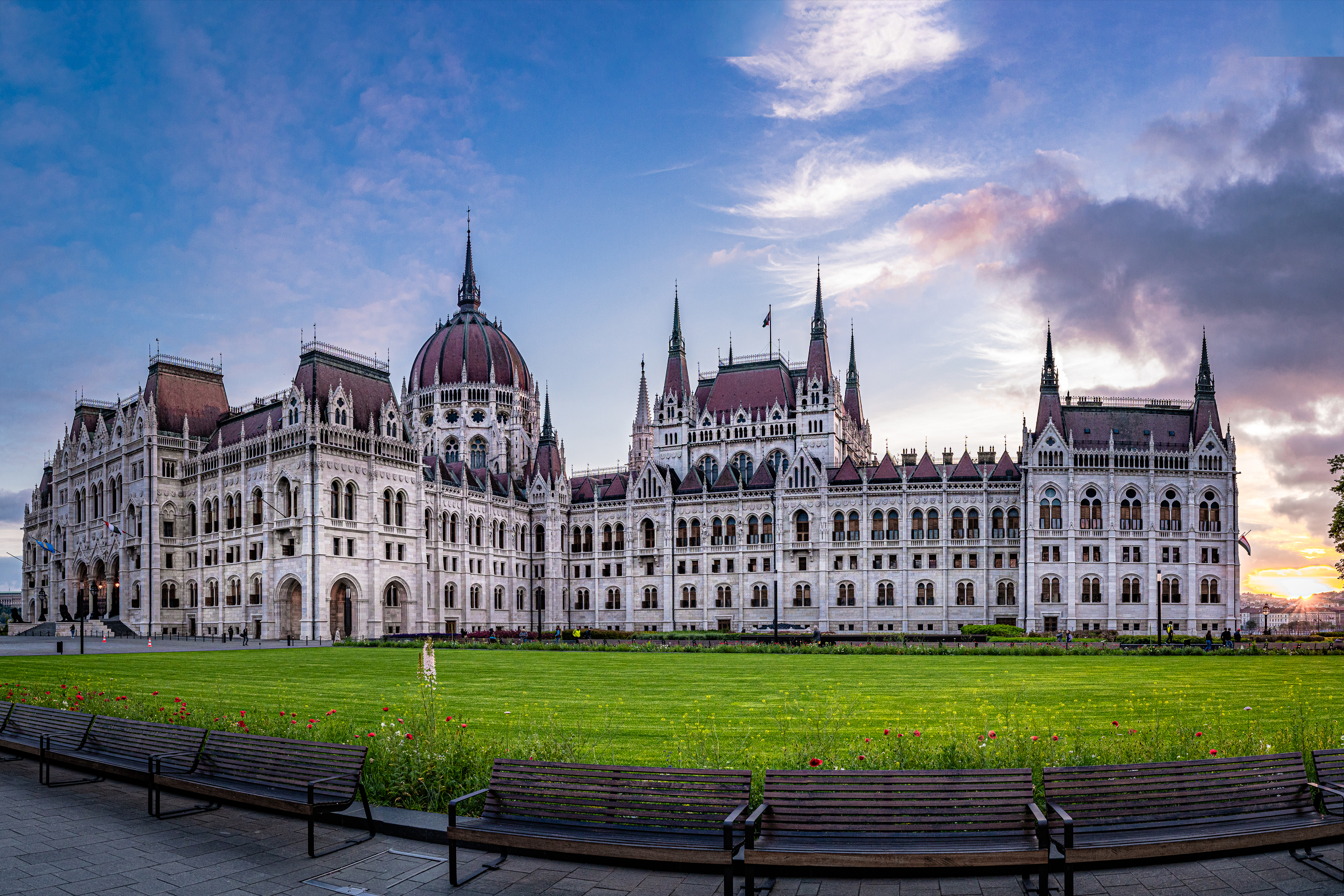
Exterior view, from Kossuth Square

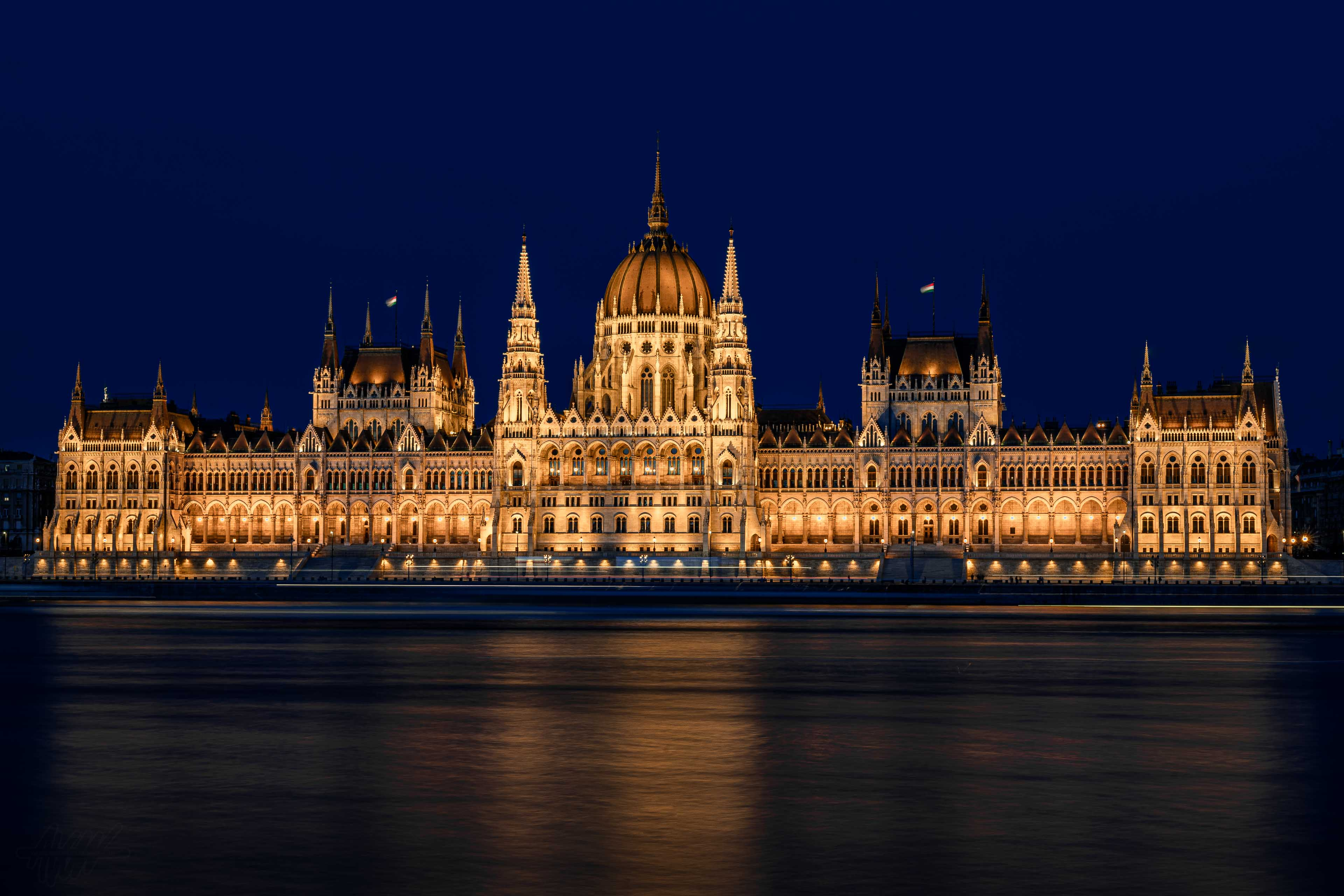
Exterior view at night from the banks of the Danube

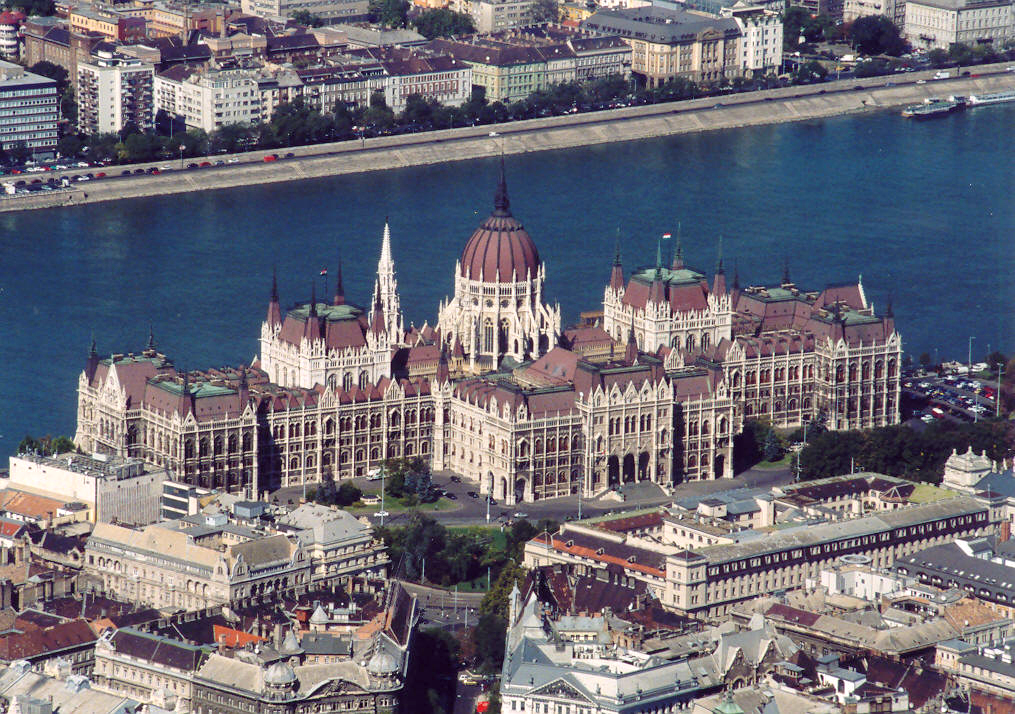
View of the rear façade

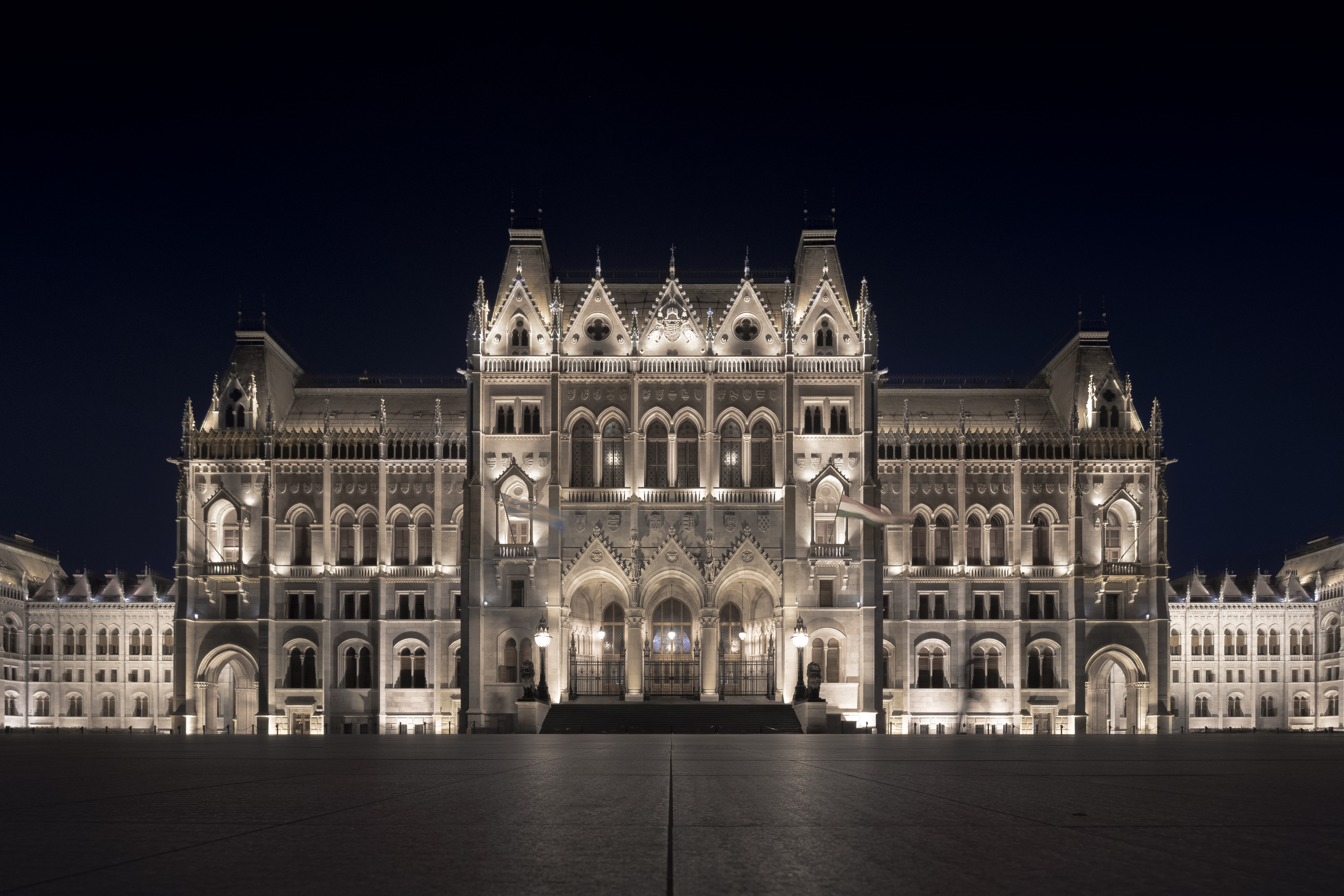
East façade at night

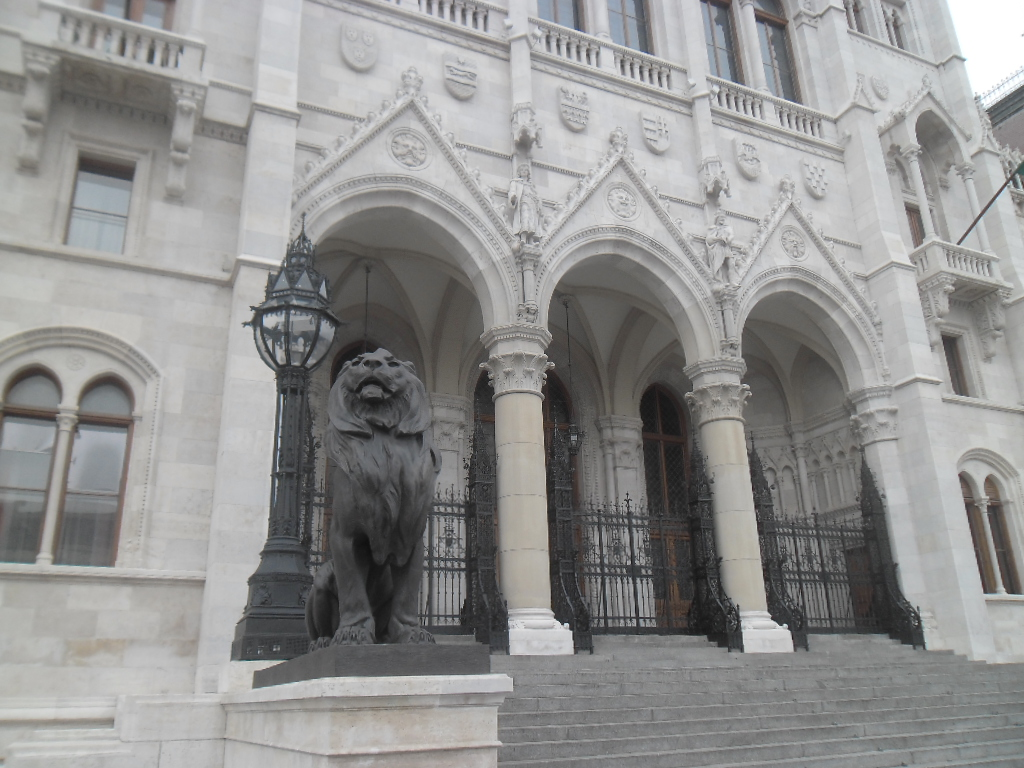
Rear entrance doors

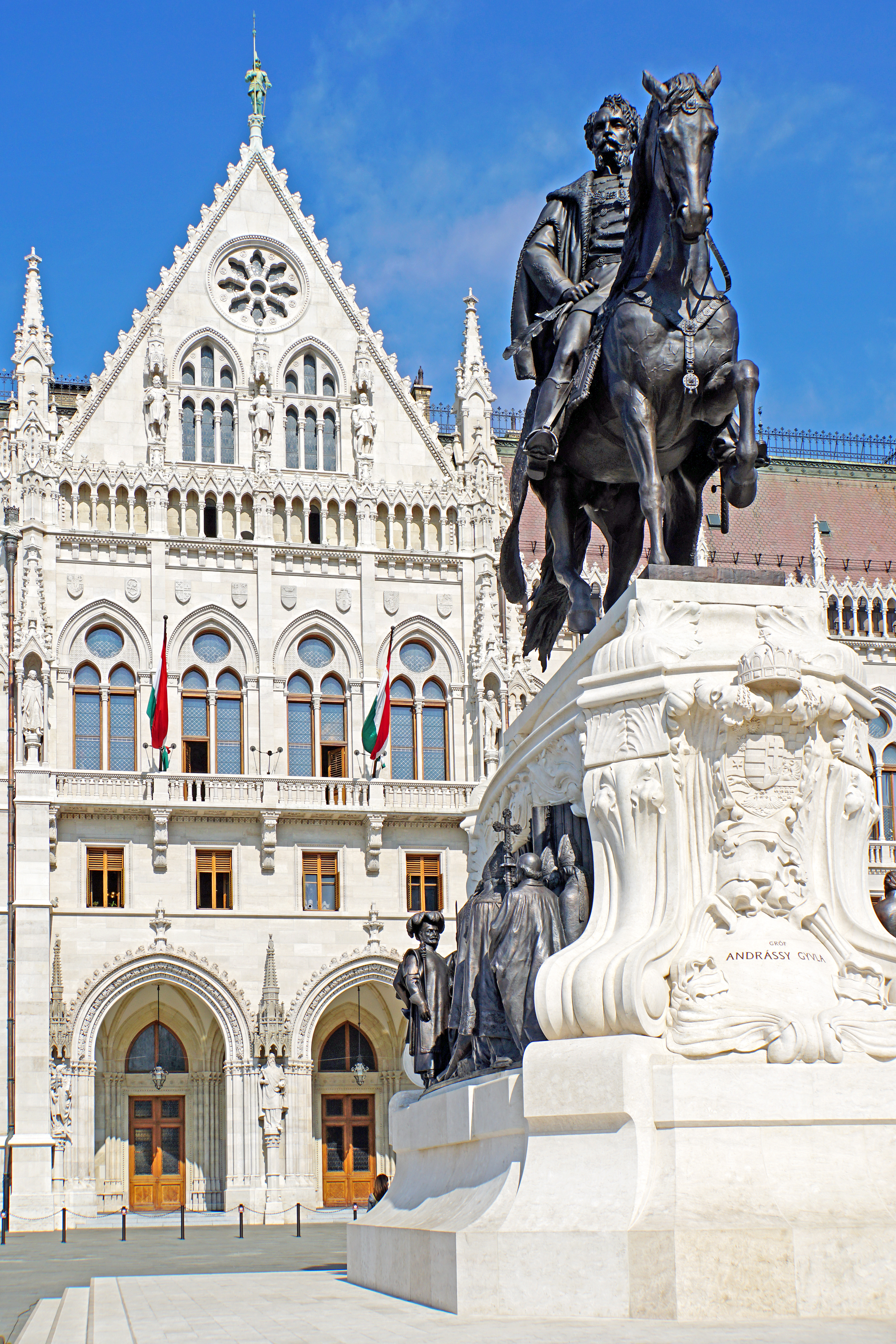
Statue of Gyula Andrássy near the south side of the building

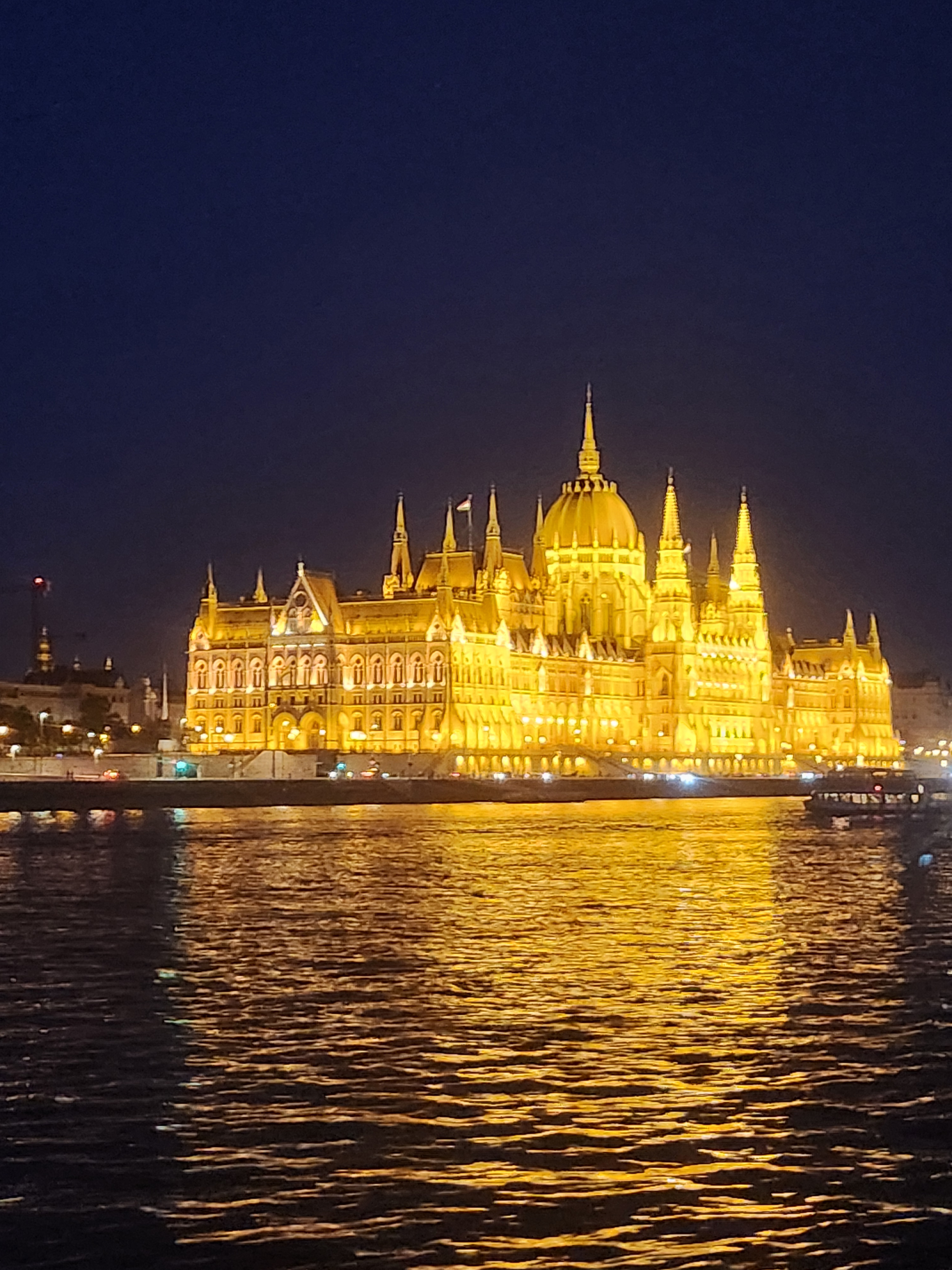
Parliament on a bright night

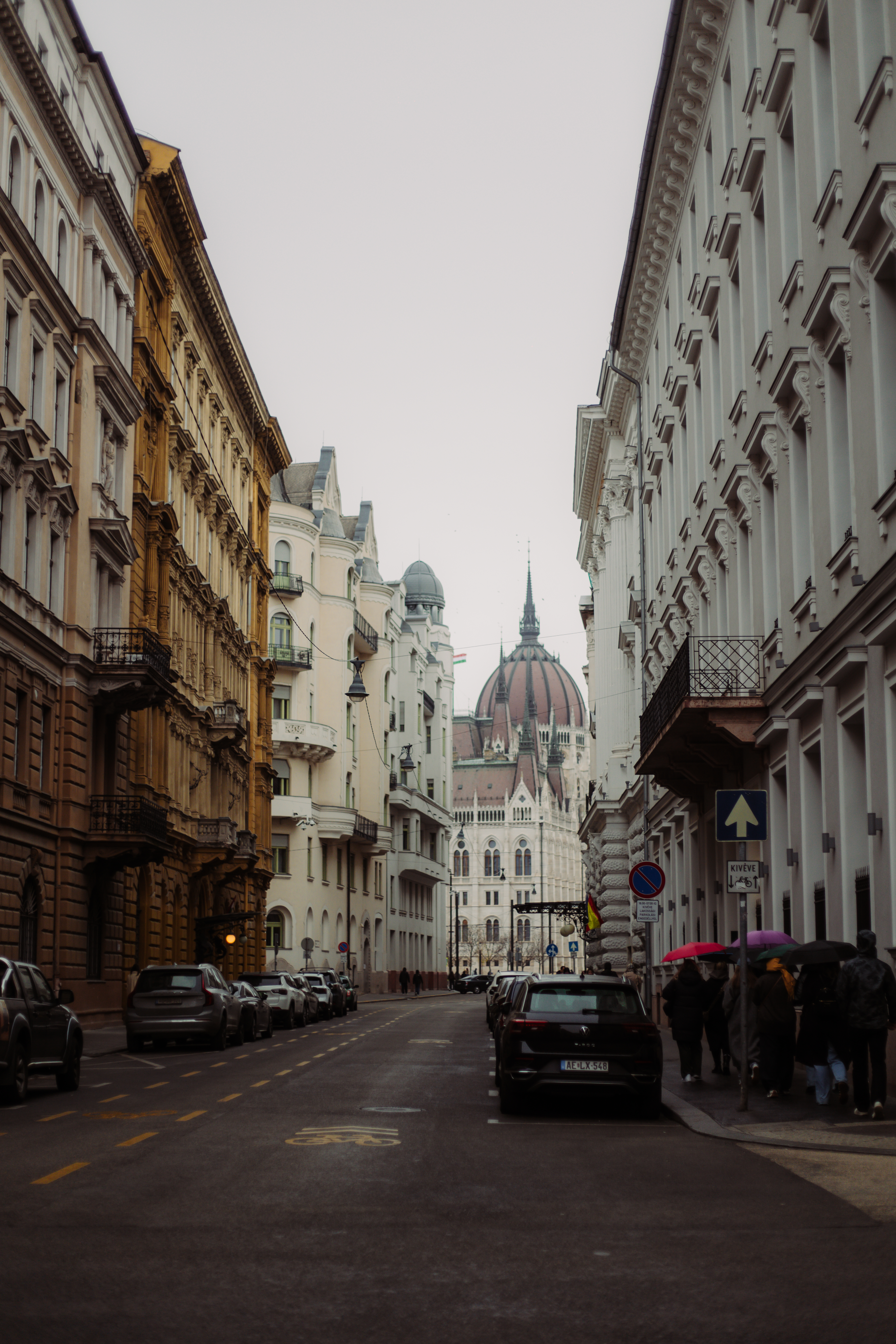
Hungarian Parliament Building - 2026

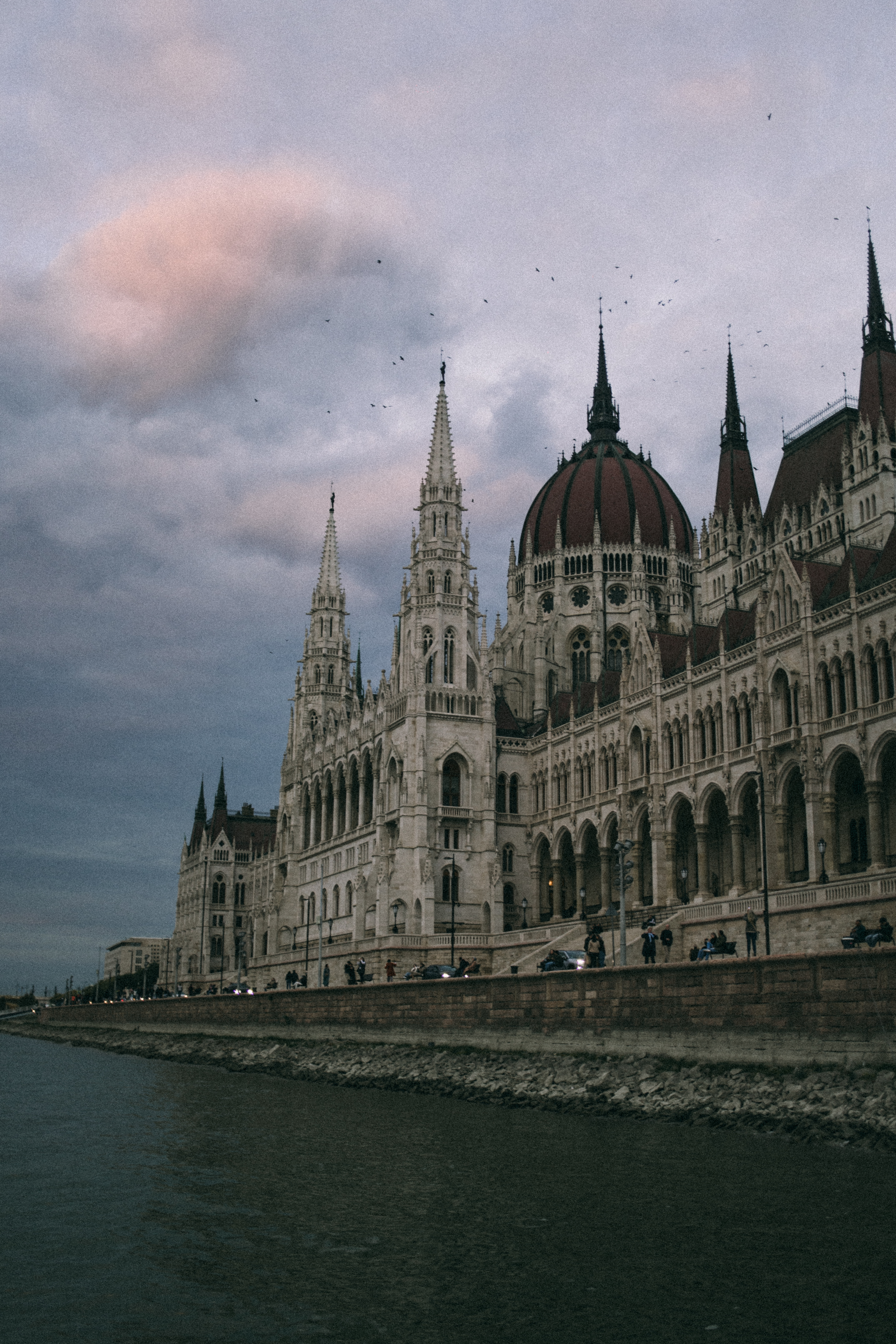
Hungarian Parliament Building - 2026

=== Interior ===
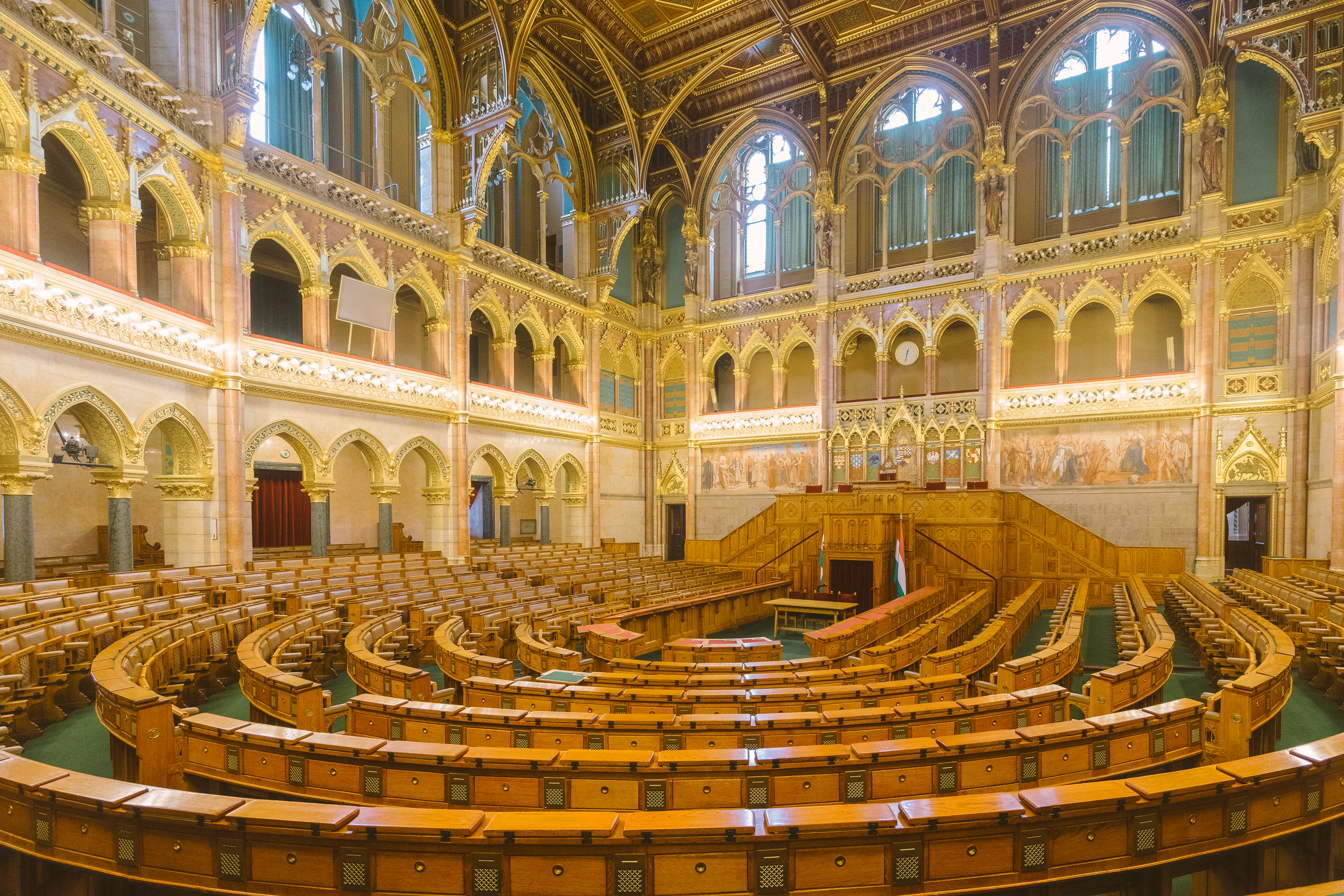
Assembly hall of the National Assembly of Hungary

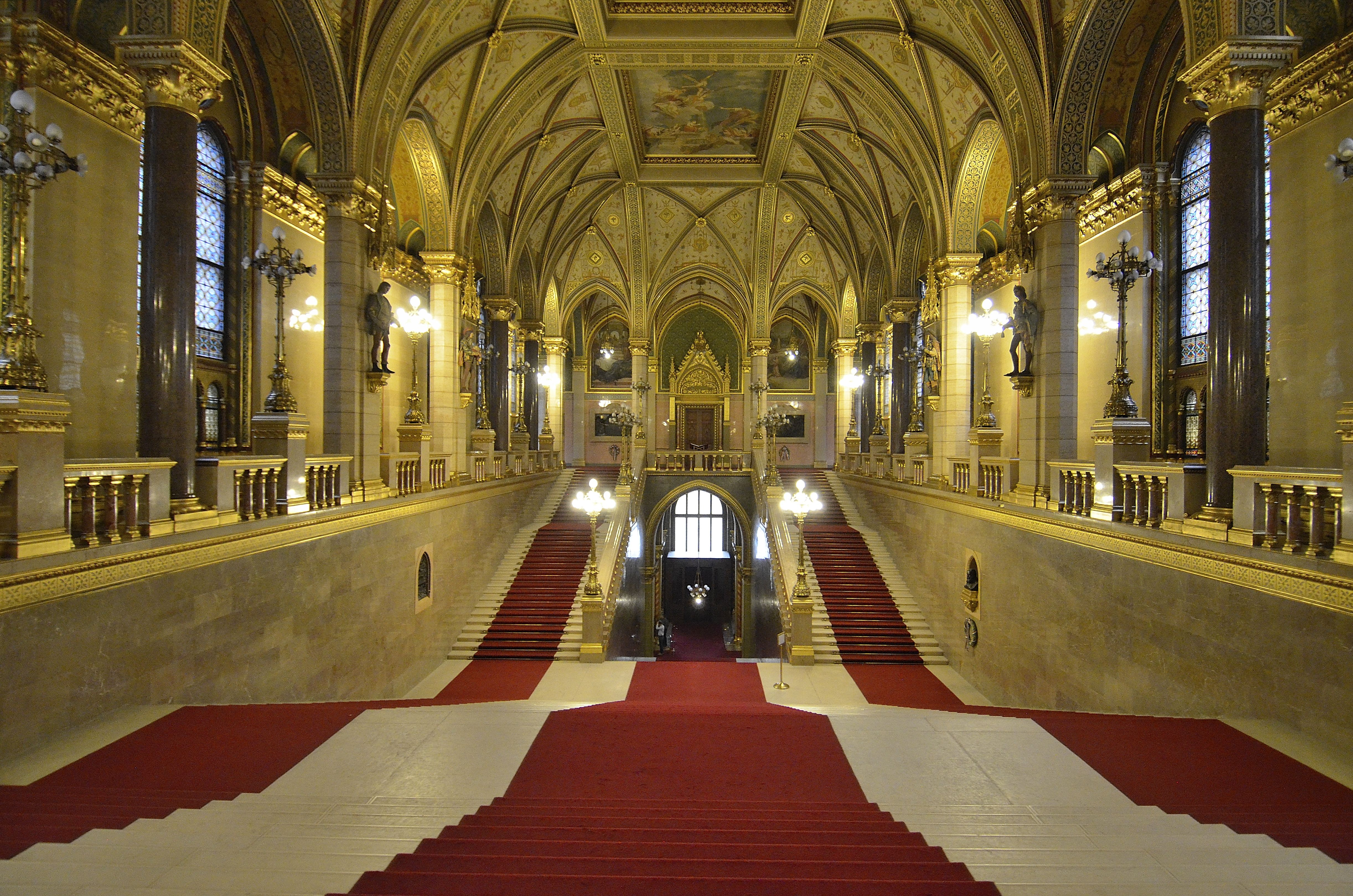
Main staircase

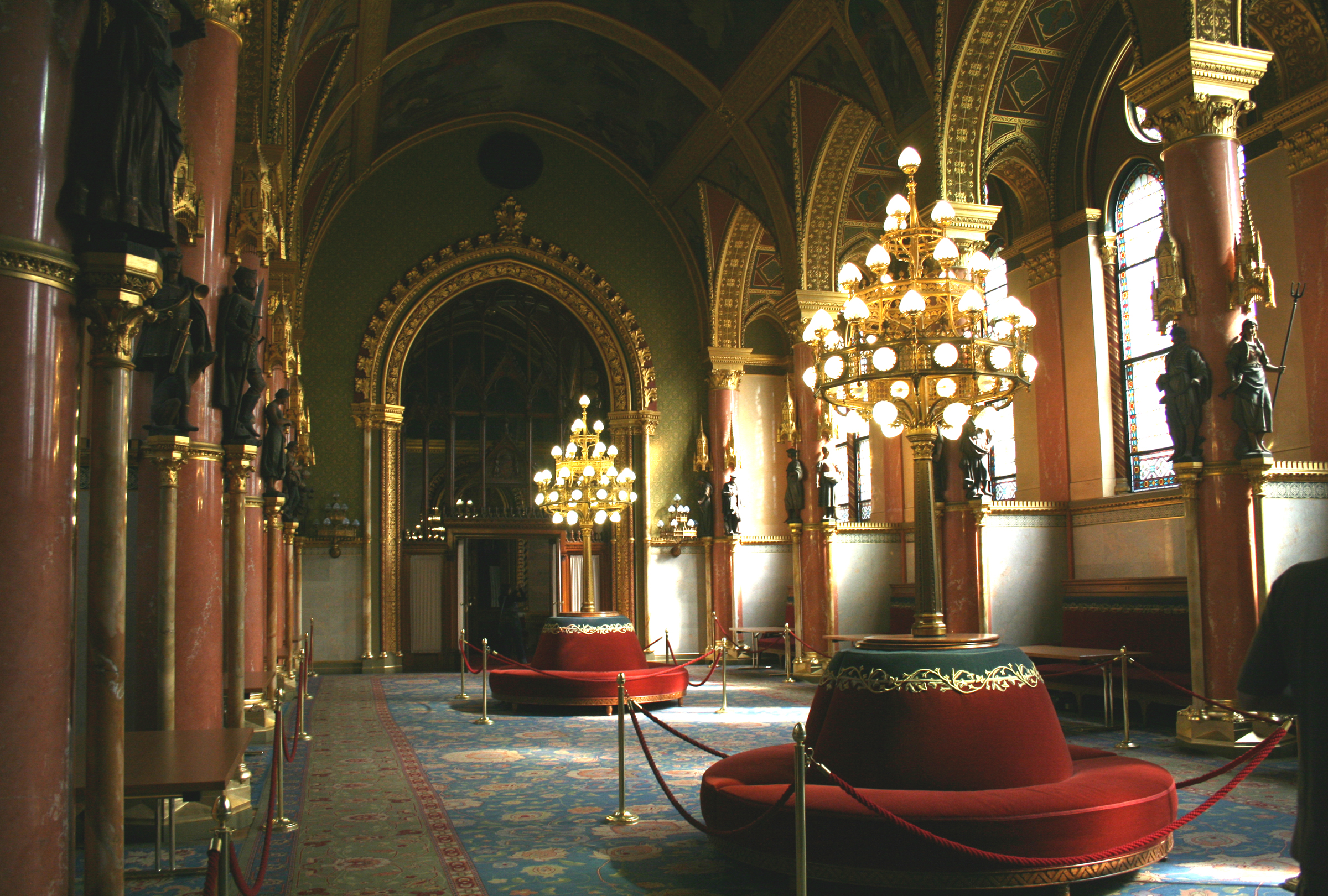
Interior of one of the rooms in the building

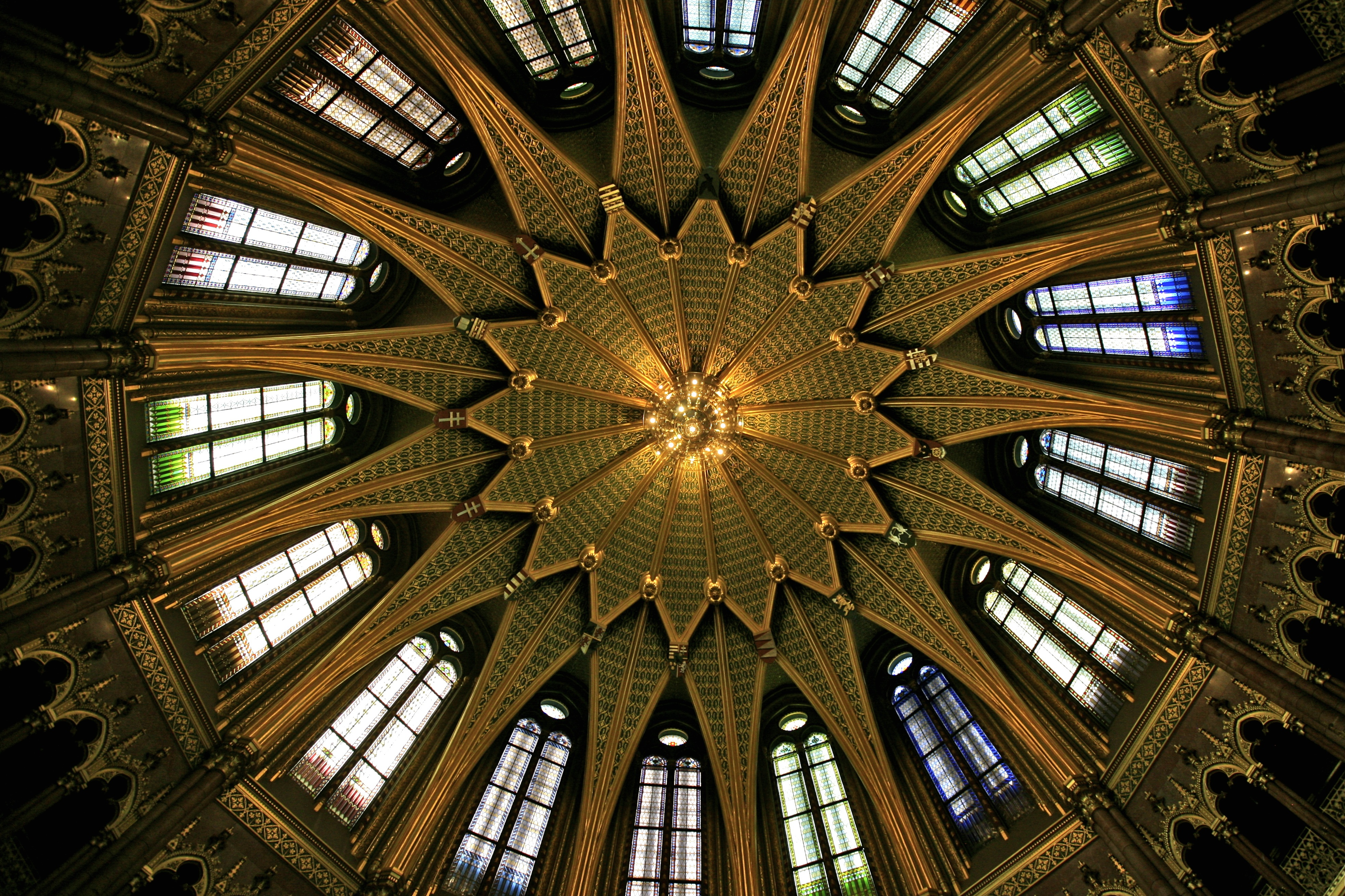
Inside view of the dome

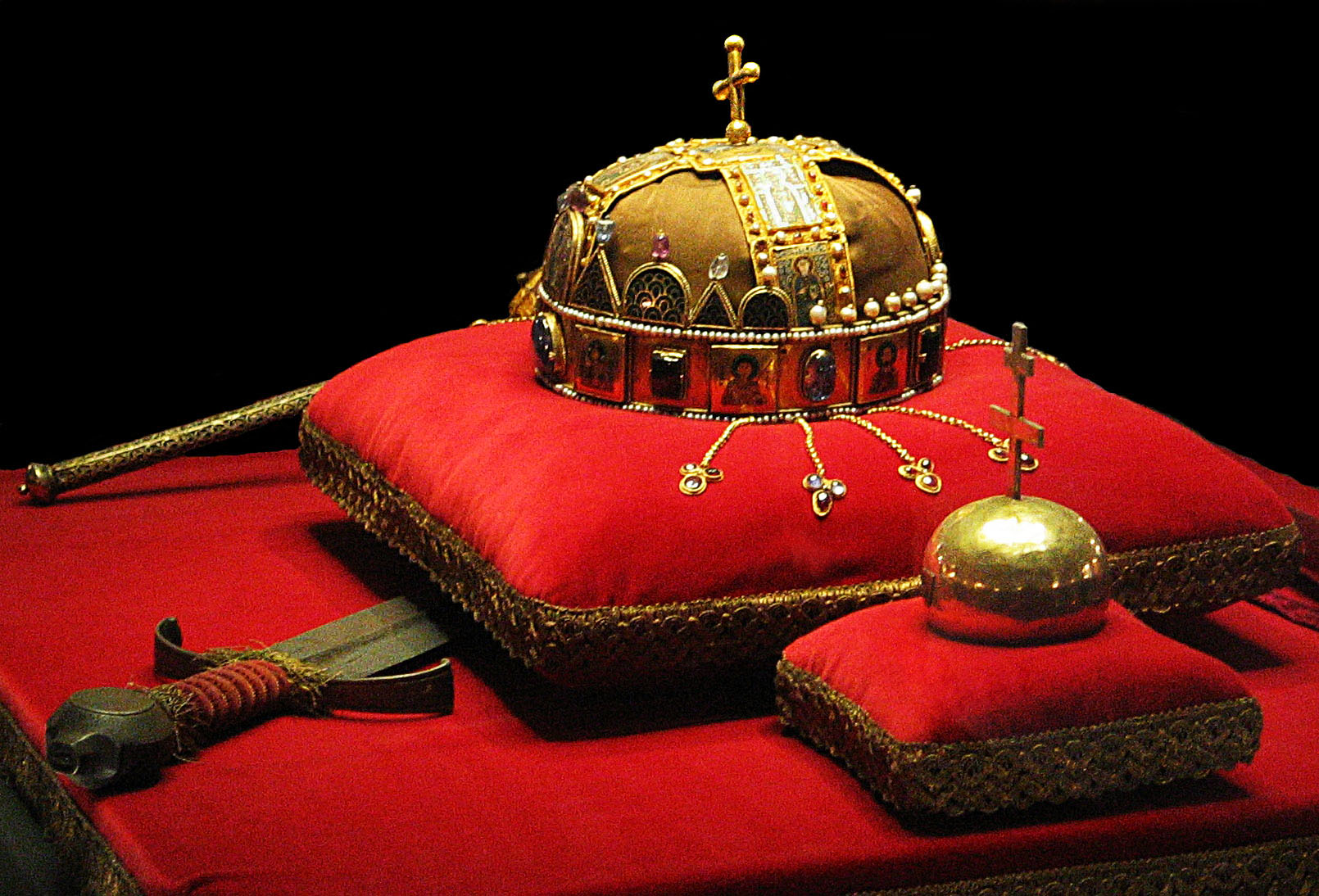
Holy Crown of Hungary in the central hall

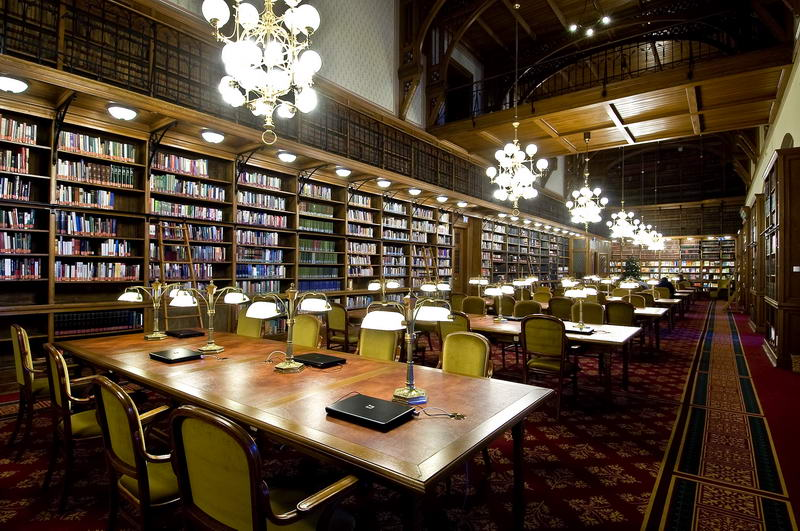
Legislative library

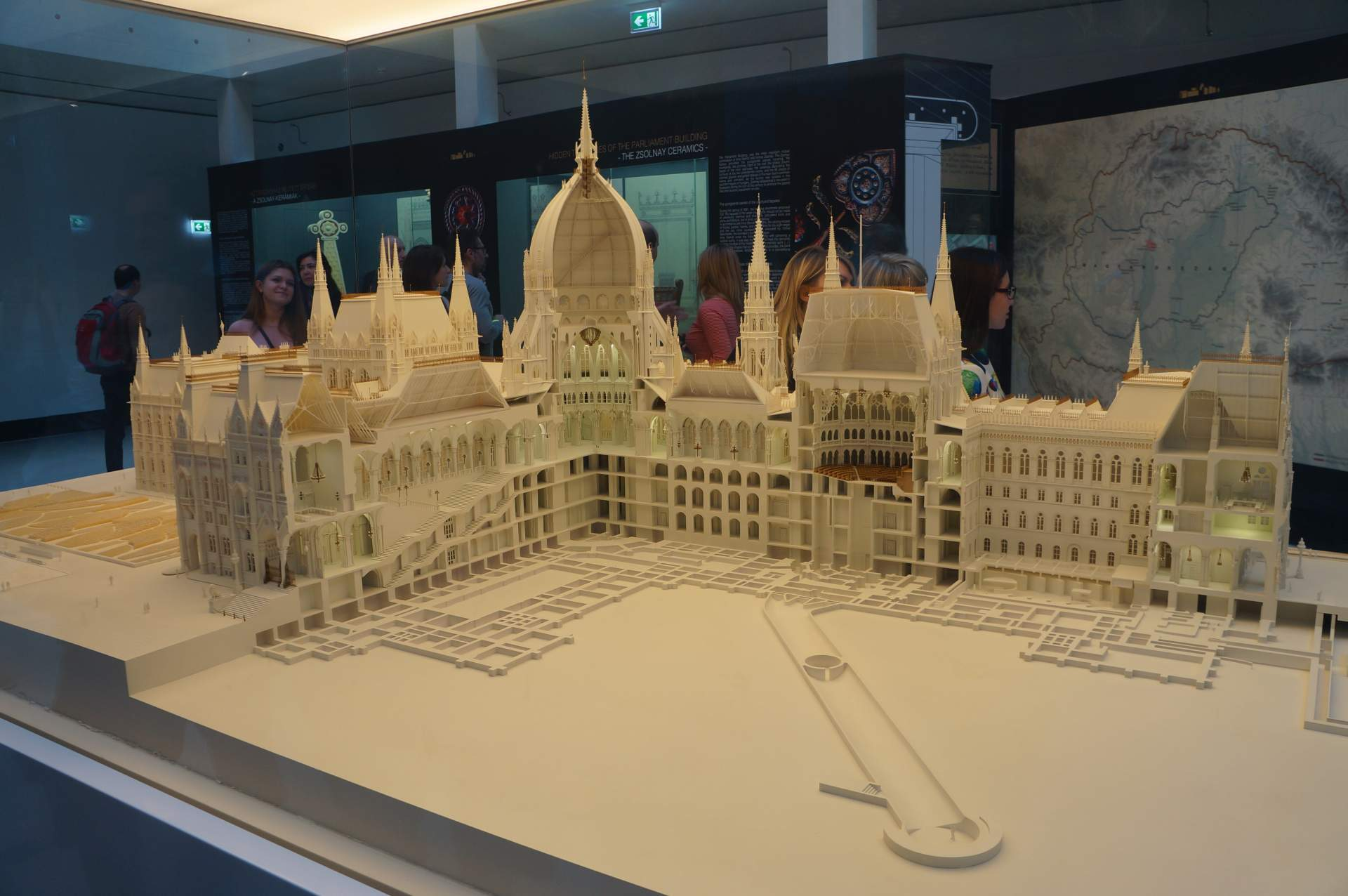
Model inside the building
