= Belváros-Lipótváros =

5th District of Budapest Budapest V. kerülete Belváros-Lipótváros
- District of Budapest
- District V
- Flag Coat of arms

- Location of District V in Budapest (shown in grey)
- Coordinates: 47°30′00″N 19°02′55″E
- Country: Hungary
- Region: Central Hungary
- City: Budapest
- Established: 17 November 1873
- Quarters: List: Belváros; Lipótváros

Government
  - Mayor: Péter Szentgyörgyvölgyi (Fidesz-KDNP)

Area
  - Total: 2.59 km^{2} (1.00 sq mi)
  - Rank: 21st

Population (2016)
  - Total: 26,284
  - Rank: 21st
  - Density: 10,100/km^{2} (26,300/sq mi)
- Demonym: ötödik kerületi ("5th districter")
- Time zone: UTC+1 (CET)
  - Summer (DST): UTC+2 (CEST)
- Postal code: 1051 ... 1056
- Website: www.belvaros-lipotvaros.hu

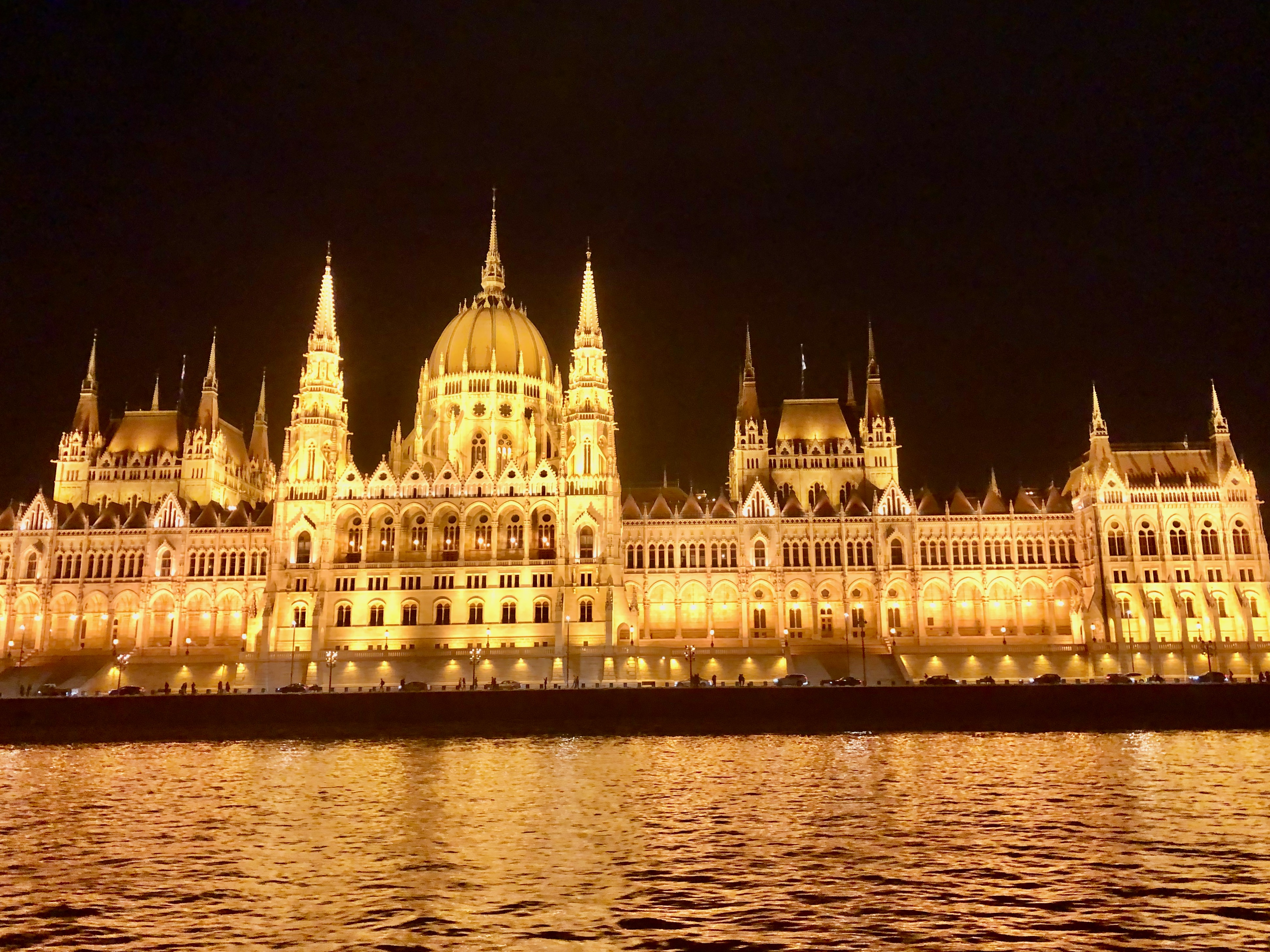
Hungarian Parliament

District V is the heart of Budapest and the political, financial, commercial and touristic center of Hungary. The name of the district is Belváros-Lipótváros (English: Inner City – Leopold Town), which refers to the two historical neighbourhoods located in the district; Belváros ("Inner City") and Lipótváros ("Leopold Town"). Inner City is the old town of Pest, while Leopold Town was established in the early 19th century, and became the political and financial centre of Hungary in the early 20th century when the Hungarian Parliament was built. The two neighbourhoods were originally the 4th (Inner City) and 5th (Leopold Town) districts of Budapest until 1950 when the two districts were merged and number IV was given to Újpest ("New Pest").

Today there is a coexisting larger definition of "inner city" (with lower case letters) which includes all of District V and some parts of District VI, District VII, District VIII, District IX and District XIII, and sometimes even some parts of the Buda side, however this larger definition is only colloquial.

The reason Inner City is not the 1st district, is that until 1873, Buda served as the capital city of Hungary, so it was obvious to start the numbering at the Buda Castle District. Districts on the Pest side received numbers from IV to X.

== Location ==
The Inner City is situated in the Pest side, on the banks of the Danube.

Neighbours of District V are (clockwise from north):

- Újlipótváros ("New Leopold Town") neighbourhood of the District XIII
- District VI: Terézváros ("Theresa Town")
- District VII: Erzsébetváros ("Elizabeth Town")
- District VIII: Józsefváros ("Joseph Town")
- District IX: Ferencváros ("Francis Town")
- River Danube

== Landmarks ==
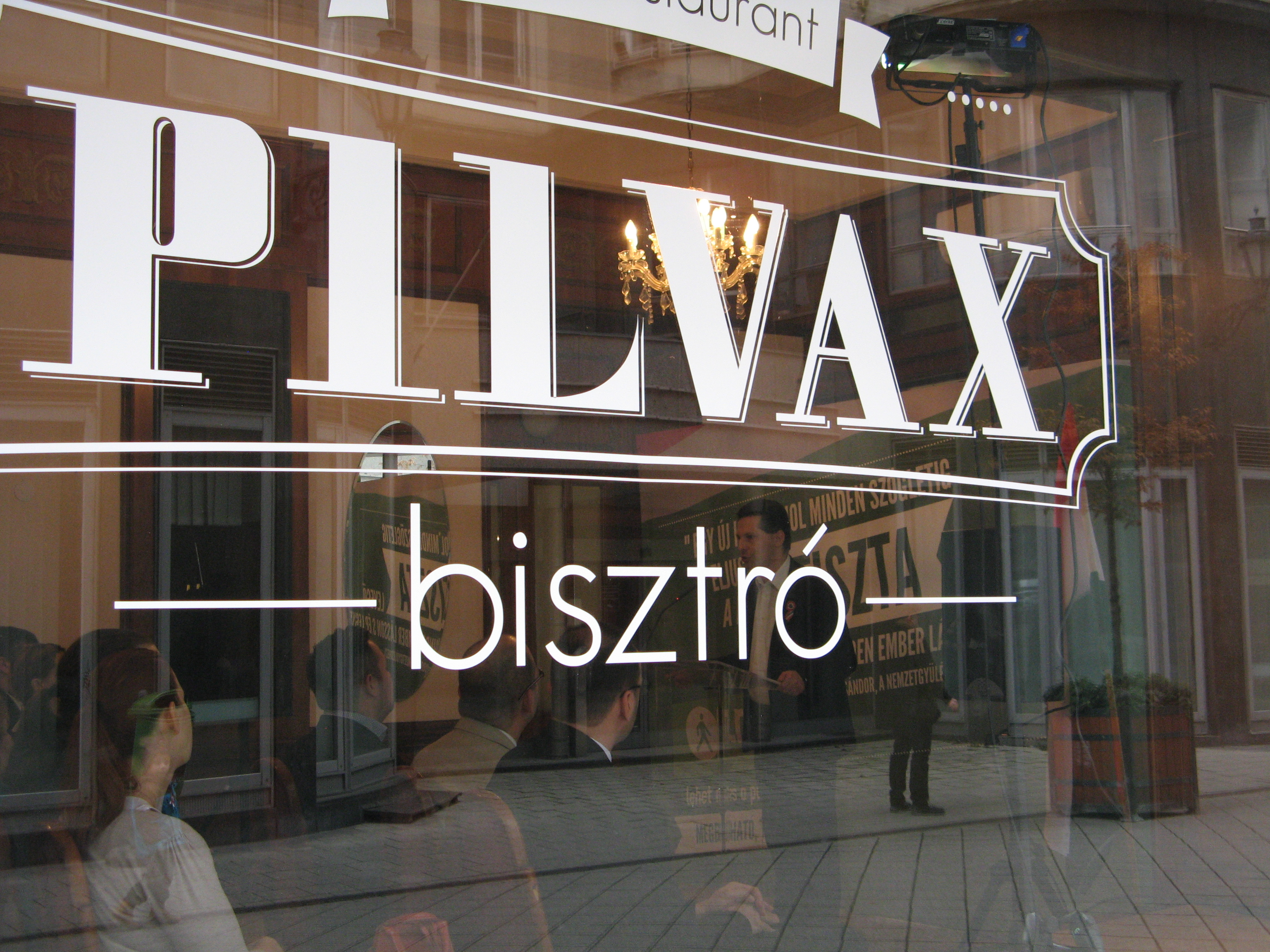
András Schiffer, speaking at Pilvax Café, the place where the Hungarian Revolution of 1848 was sparked, on the anniversary 15 March 2015.

Inner City

- Inner City Parish Church
- Váci Street
- Evangelical-Lutheran Church on Deák Ferenc tér (Ferenc Deák Square)
- Pilvax Café
- Elisabeth Bridge

Leopold Town

- Hungarian Parliament Building
- St Stephen's Basilica
- Hungarian Academy of Sciences
- Széchenyi Chain Bridge
- Gresham Palace
- Vigadó Concert Hall
- Liberty Square
- Danube Promenade
- University Church
- U.S. Embassy
- Supreme Court
- Ministry of Education
- Ministry of Youth
- Ethnographical Museum

== Politics ==
The current mayor of V. District of Budapest is Péter Szentgyörgyvölgyi (Fidesz).

The District Assembly, elected at the 2019 local government elections, is made up of 15 members (1 Mayor, 10 Individual constituencies MEPs and 4 Compensation List MEPs) divided into this political parties and alliances:

Party	Seats	Current District Assembly
Fidesz-KDNP	10	M
Opposition coalition (Note: Coalition of Momentum–DK–MSZP–Dialogue–LMP.)	5	

=== List of mayors ===
Member	Party	Date
Gábor Mihályi	SZDSZ	1990–1994
Károly Karsai	Fidesz	1994–2002
Pál Steiner	MSZP	2002–2006
Antal Rogán	Fidesz	2006–2014
Péter Szentgyörgyvölgyi	Fidesz	2014–

== Twin towns ==
Belváros-Lipótváros is twinned with:

- Charlottenburg-Wilmersdorf (Berlin), Germany
- Mondragone, Italy
- Gheorgheni, Romania
- Inlăceni (Atid), Romania
- Old Town (Kraków), Poland
- Prague 2, Czech Republic
- Rakhiv, Ukraine
- Rimetea, Romania
- Rožňava, Slovakia
- Bačka Topola, Serbia
- Korydallos, Greece
- Yerevan, Armenia

== See also ==
- Inner City
- Lipótváros
- List of districts in Budapest
- List of tourist attractions in Budapest
