= Leopold Town =

Leopold Town may refer to:

- Leopoldstadt, a municipality of Vienna, Austria
- Lipótváros, a neighborhood in Budapest, Hungary
