= Bauhaus in Budapest =

Style of art in Budapest

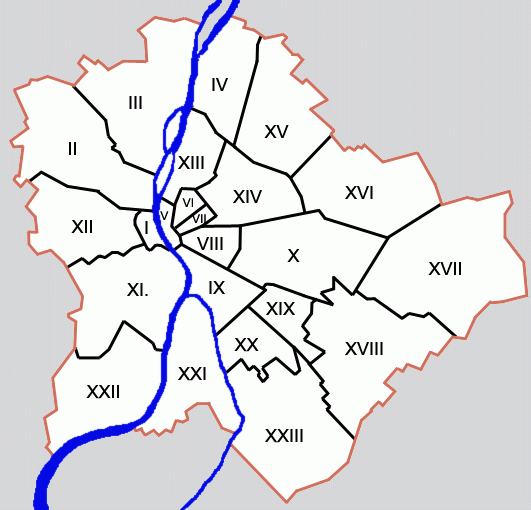
The District Map of Budapest

Bauhaus was a dominant architectural tendency in Budapest, the capital of Hungary, between 1930 and 1948. Large residential buildings, cinemas, churches and even an airport was built in this style, in particular in Újlipótváros in the XIII district, and Városmajor and Pasarét in the II district of the city.

== Pasarét ==
- Villas in Napraforgó utca (District 2, Napraforgó utca 1-22). In 1931, some representatives of the modern architecture style made a proposal to the Budapest Public Works Council to have a whole street designed by the best architects, based on an example in Stuttgart. The plan was implemented one year later. In spite of using small sites, an enthusiastic builder devoted to modern architecture carried out the outstanding plans in a magnificent way. There is a small square in the middle of the street, where a stone displays the names of all architects involved. There are altogether 22 villas, with a creek called Devil’s Trench on one side. Although some of the houses have been rebuilt since then, the original character was maintained nearly everywhere.
- Villa with two-storey flats, Lotz Károly utca 4/b. The villa was built in 1933, and the architect decided to apply the two-storey arrangement in order to increase the garden area. The building was designed by Farkas Molnár, an internationally renowned Hungarian master of Bauhaus.
- Villa with variable walls at Harangvirág utca 11. The variable walls enable the residents to create a 100-squaremeter area inside the flats.
- Special villa at Pasaréti út 97. It is a multi-storey building that fits very well with the garden. It was extended in the 70s, maintaining the original idea.
- Villa at Orsó utca 21. It is a building with a roof terrace. It was built on a narrow, sloping site. The architect was Lajos Kozma.
- Residential building at Trombitás utca 32. It seems as if several villas had been built into one, the chessboard like facade allows for a complete separation.
- Roman Catholic Church and monastery in Pasaréti tér. It was built in the centre of the quarter in 1933, according to the solemn and simple plan of Gyula Rimanóczy.

== Bauhaus 1933 floor plan ==
Round Staircase and other typical Bauhaus construction elements, Bauhaus proportions, on this original Floor plan from August 1933 in Budapest.

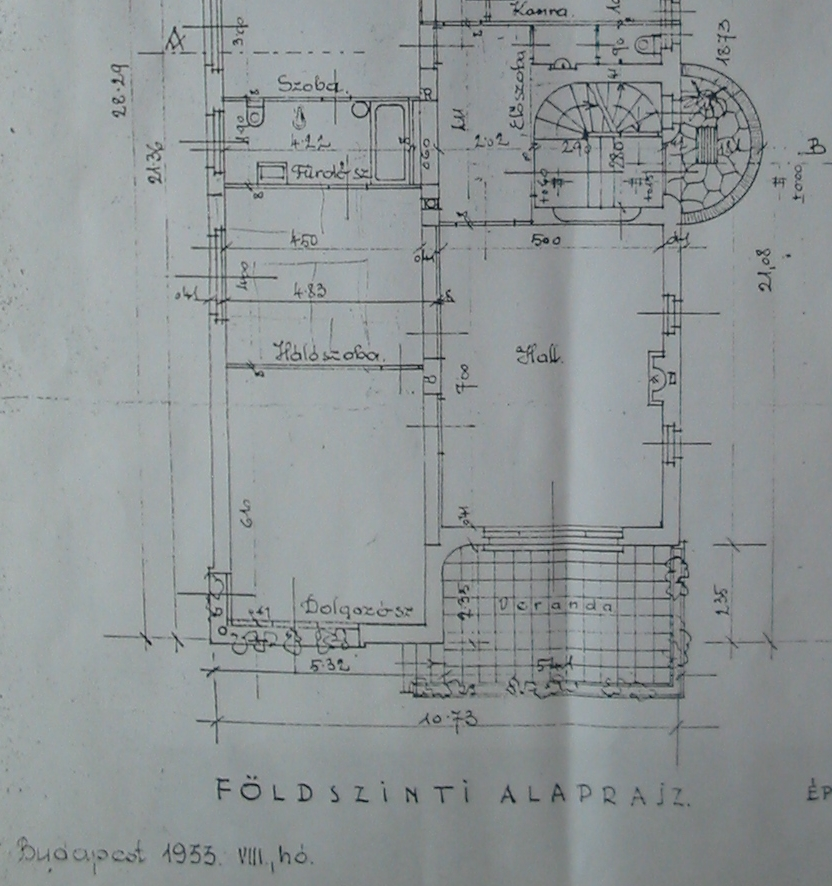
detail from Bauhaus Floor plan August 1933 in Budapest

detail Bauhaus Staircase, August 1933 in Budapest

== Újlipótváros, Szent István park (St. Stephen’s Park) and Margit körút ==
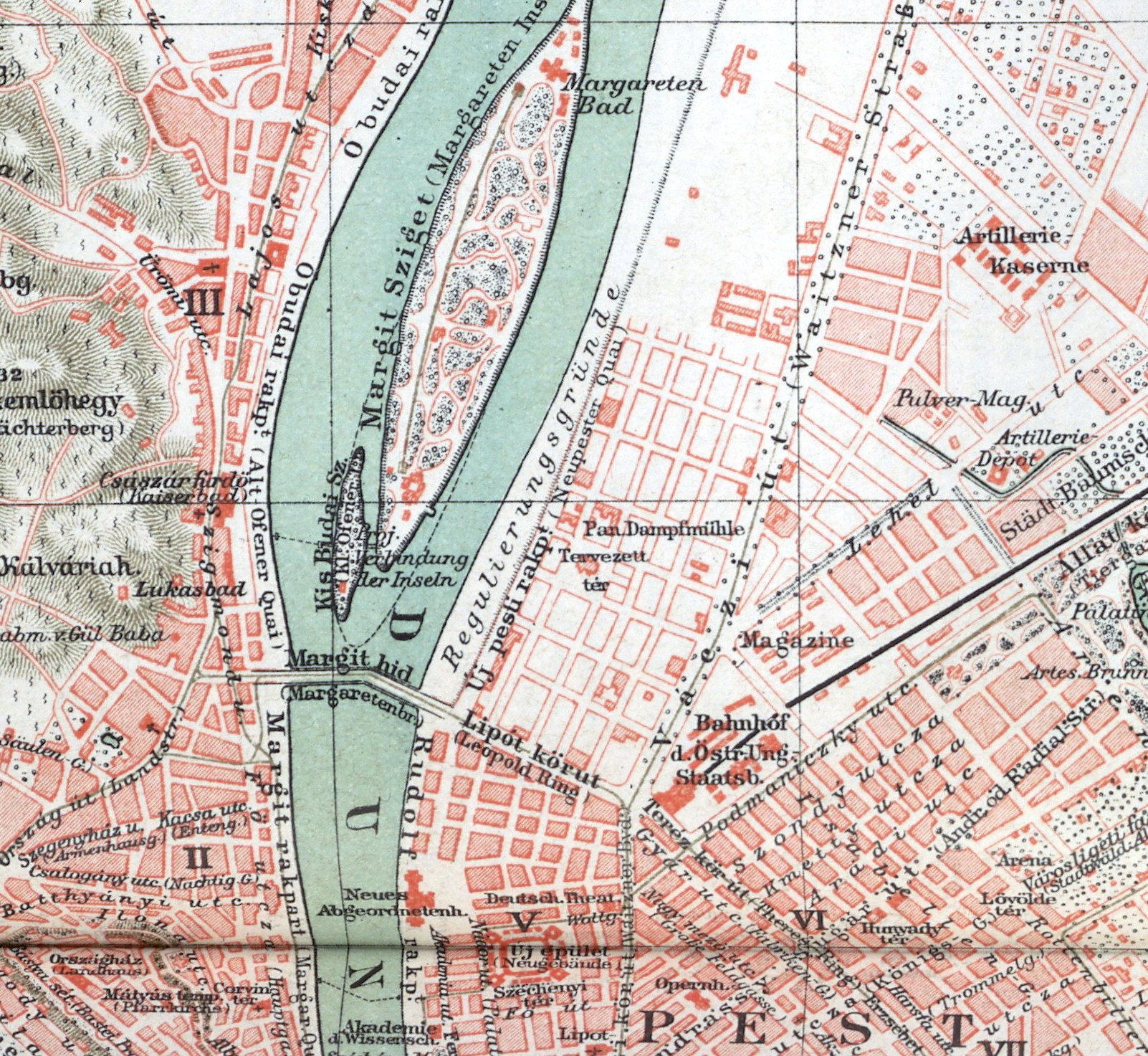
1890 - the Bridge was not connected to Margaret Island, Ujlipótváros streets projected

Szent István park (St. Stephen’s Park) (XIII., between the River Danube and Hollán Ernő utca).

This area lies to the North of Margit Bridge and was built in the 1930 with breathtaking speed, along Pozsonyi út. The most scenic place of the whole area is St. Stephen’s Park, part of which has a view on the river, with huge and envied roof terraces. The houses are 25 meters tall, they are all six-storey buildings. Their design and construction began in 1928, on an area of 33,000 square meters.

Most of the houses on that square were designed by Béla Hofstätter and Ferenc Domány. Public transport: Jászai Mari tér: Tram No. 4/6, Tram No. 2. On the Google Maps .

- Pozsonyi út 53-55. An interesting building with shops, standing on a triangle-shaped site at the corner of Wahrmann Mór köz.
- Budapest Pozsonyi Street Protestant Church (Pozsonyi út 58.) A church and a belfry in modern style with classicist streaks. It was opened in 1940.
- Dunapark House. Pozsonyi út 38-42. A complex of two luxury houses. A cinema was planned to be built between the two houses, but it was not implemented eventually. However, the area of the café increased this way.
- Residential building at Pozsonyi út 33/a. Its unique features are a foyer with an arched wall, standing in a 45 degree angle with the entrance, as well as an elegant doorway.
- Residential building at Tátra utca 5/c. It has especially large balconies, which run all the way along the facade. It also has asymmetric shop facilities.
- Residential building at Pozsonyi út 19. A corner house with a variable facade and interesting arched balconies on the corner.

== Pasarét Church and Heart of Jesus Church in Városmajor ==
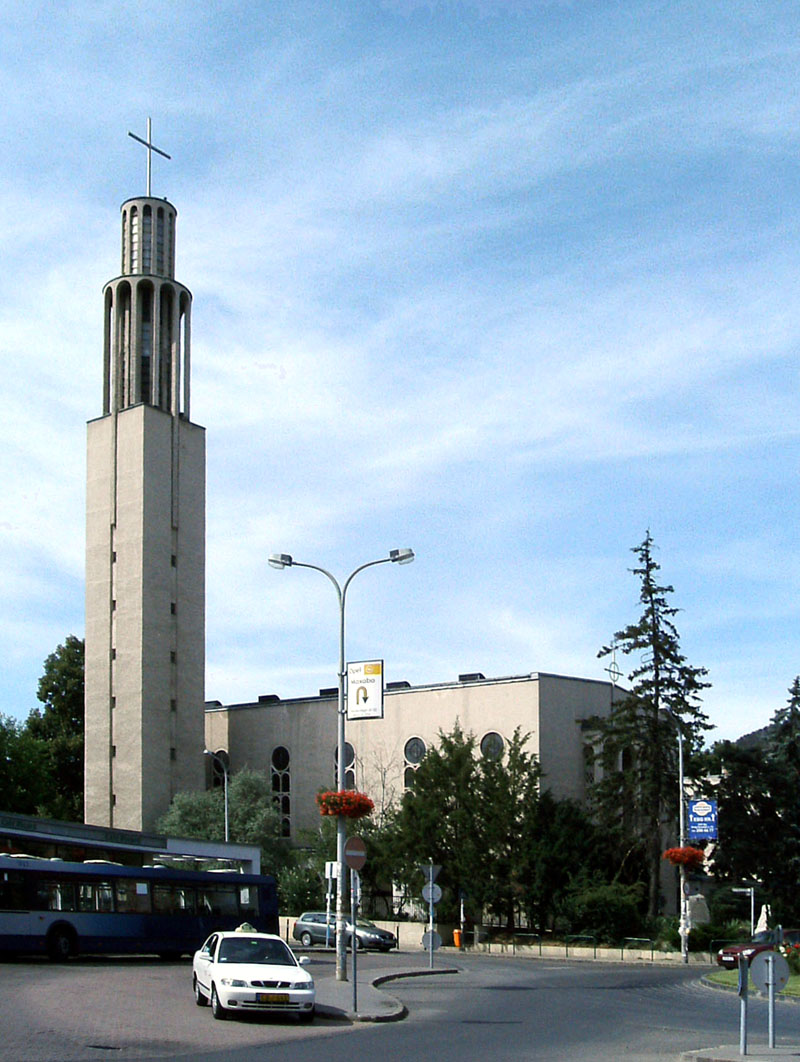
Pasaret church, plan of Gyula Rimanóczy

- Roman Catholic Church and monastery in Pasaréti tér. It was built in the centre of the quarter in 1933, according to the solemn and simple plan of Gyula Rimanóczy.
- Heart of Jesus Church in Városmajor (XII., 5 Csaba utca) Bertalan Árkay’s Városmajor Church and its belfry (1933-1937) form an outstanding piece of art of the era between the two wars as well as of the history of Hungarian church architecture in general. Public transport: take Underground Line 2 or Tram No. 4/6 to Moszkva tér.

== Bauhaus in Budapest about 1930 ==
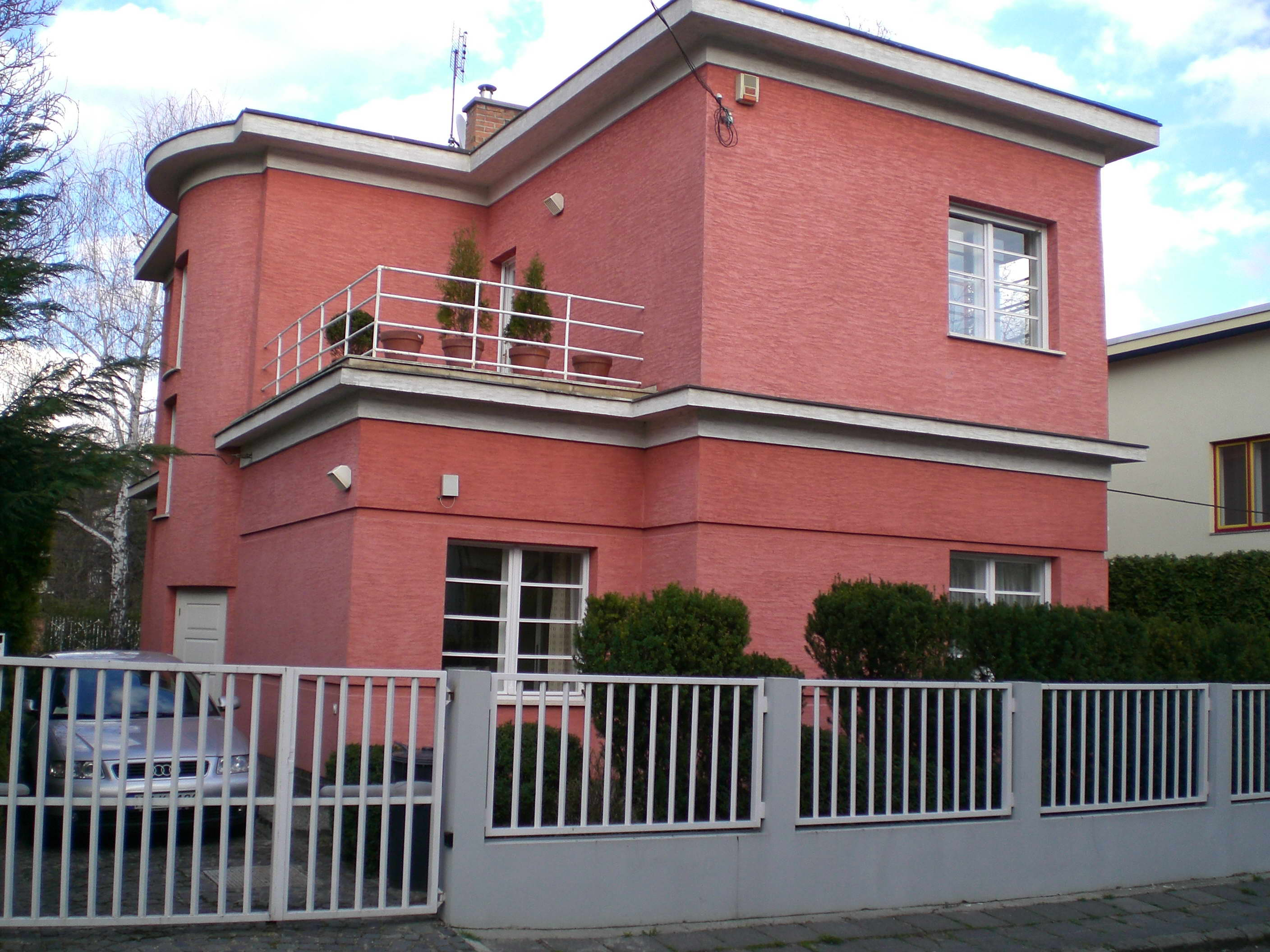

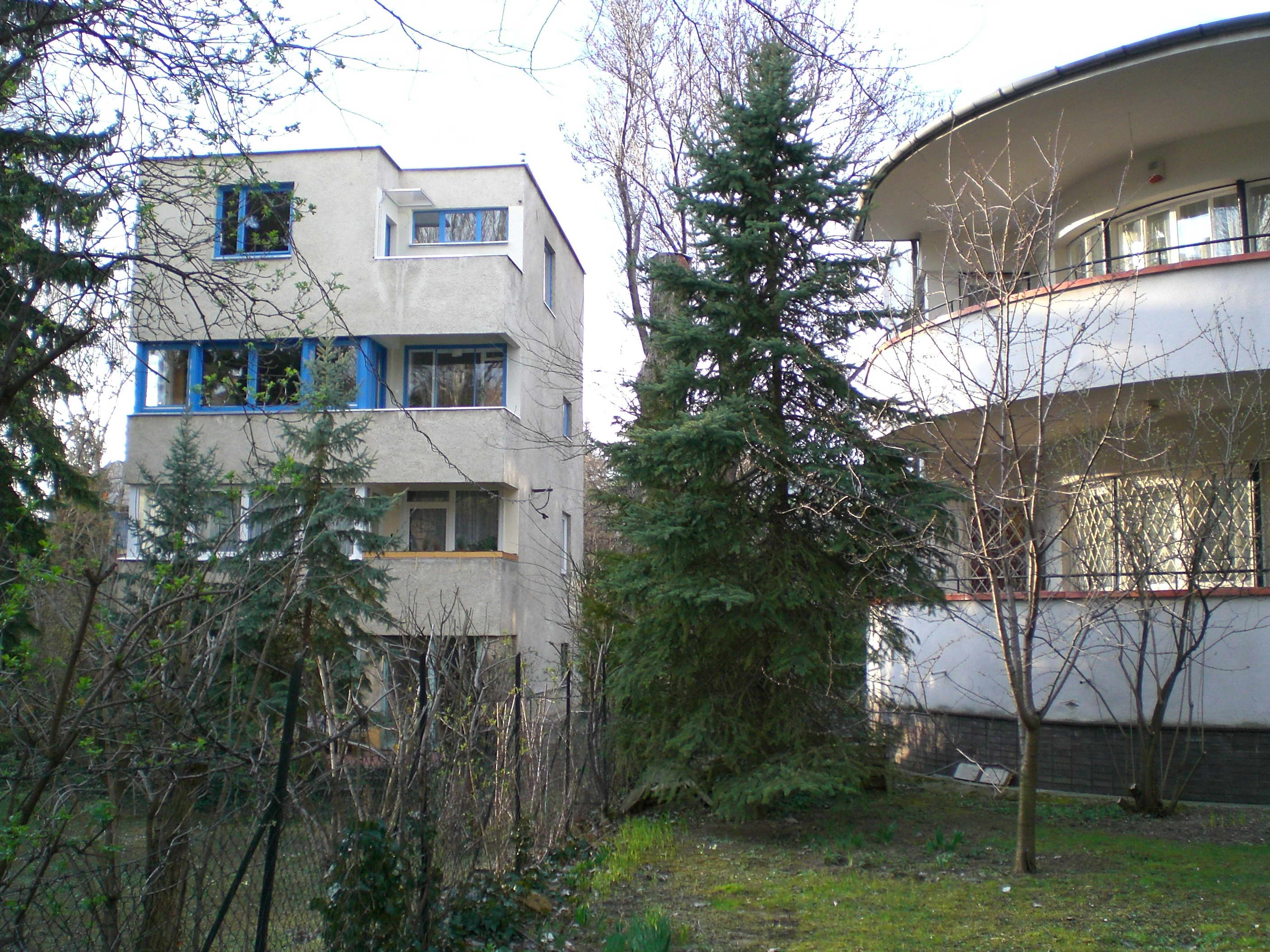

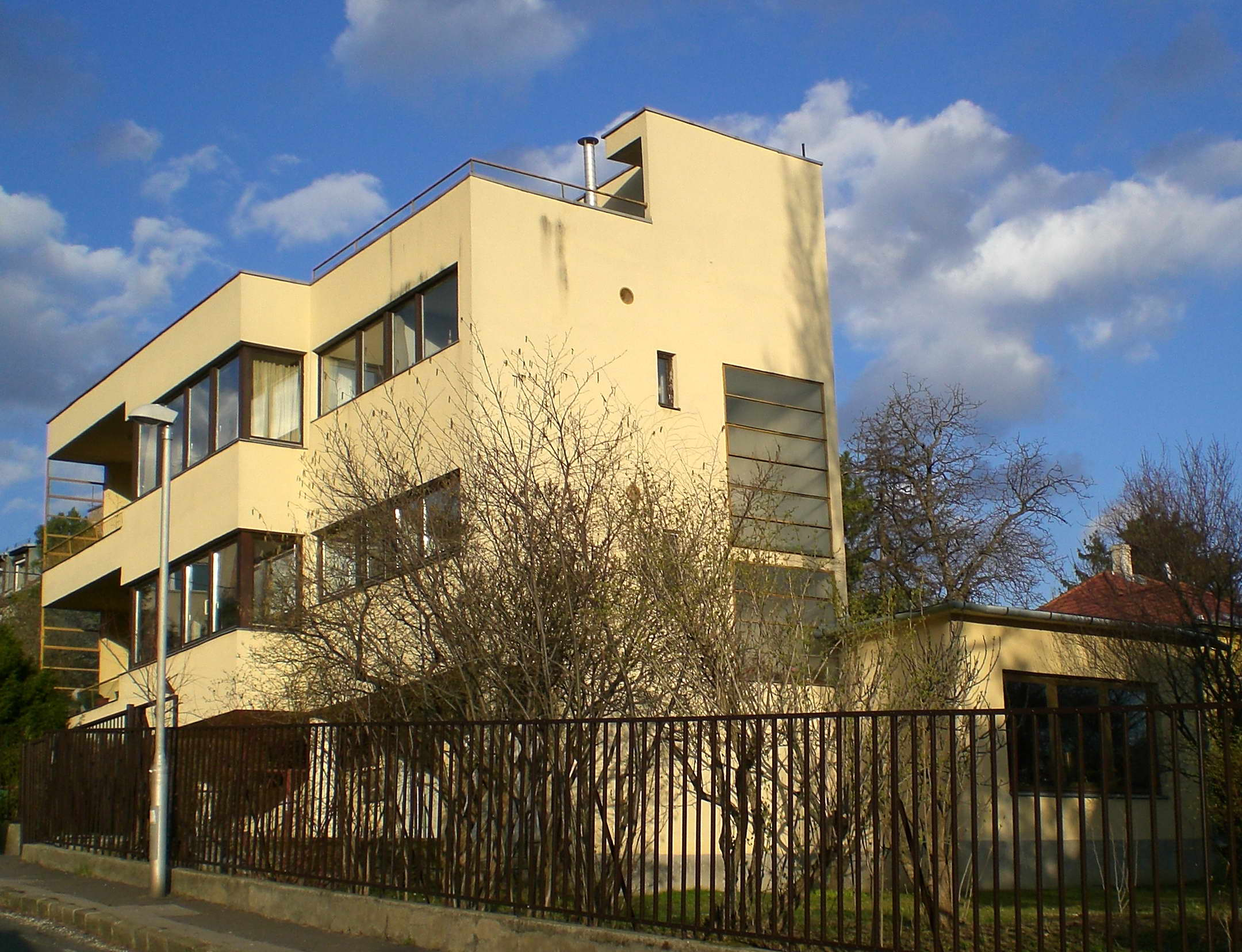

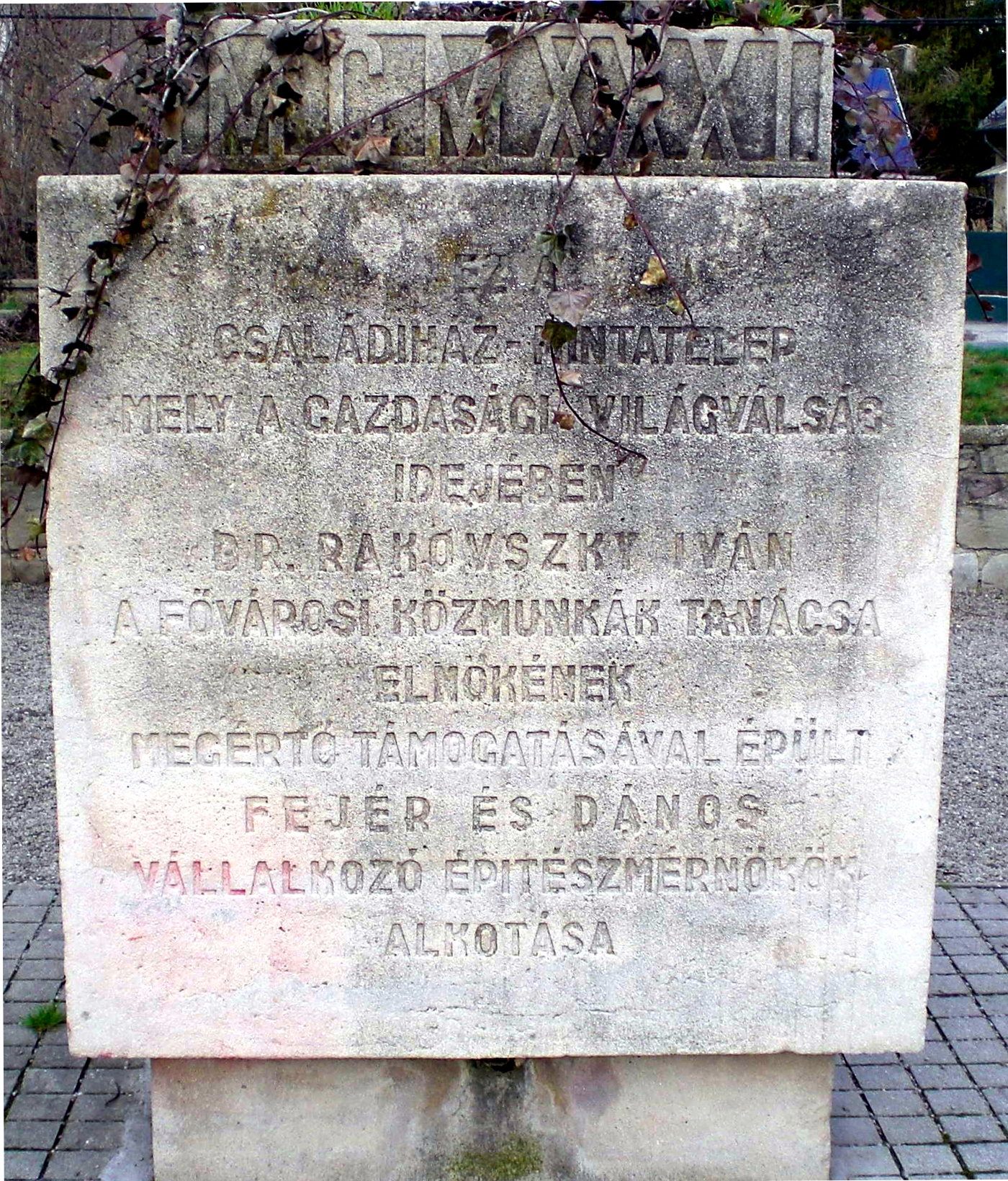
Settlement initiated 1932 after the Great Depression

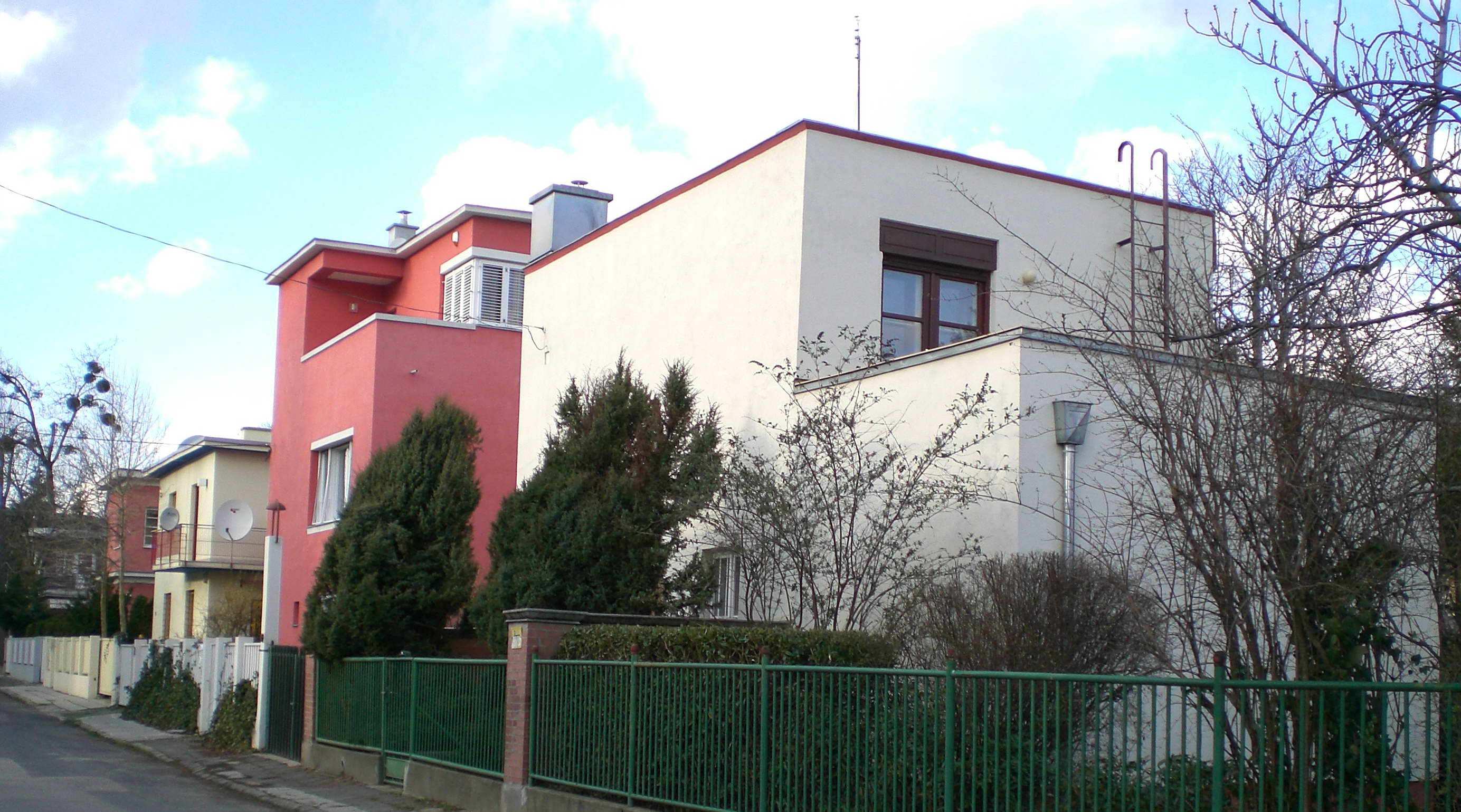

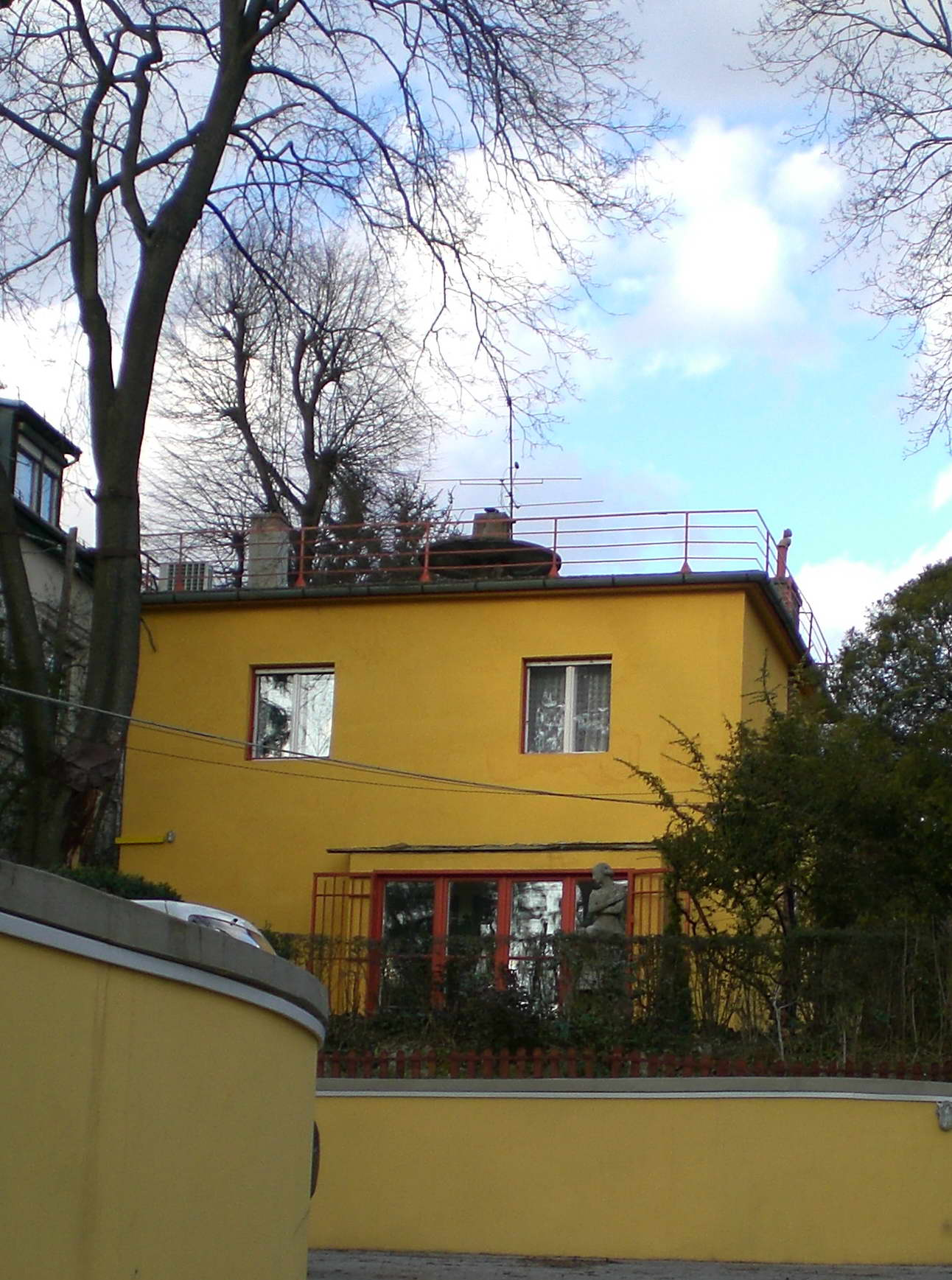

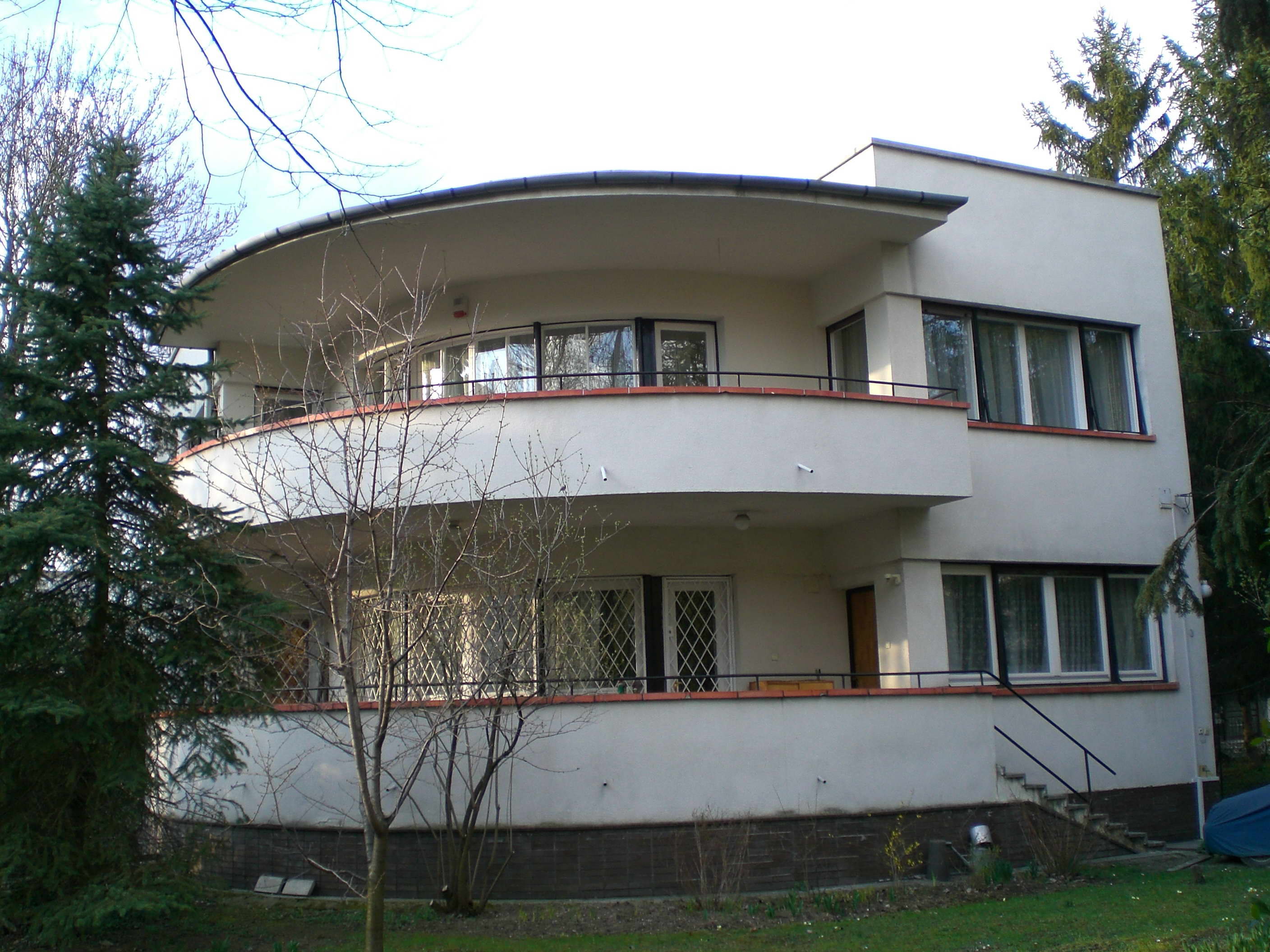

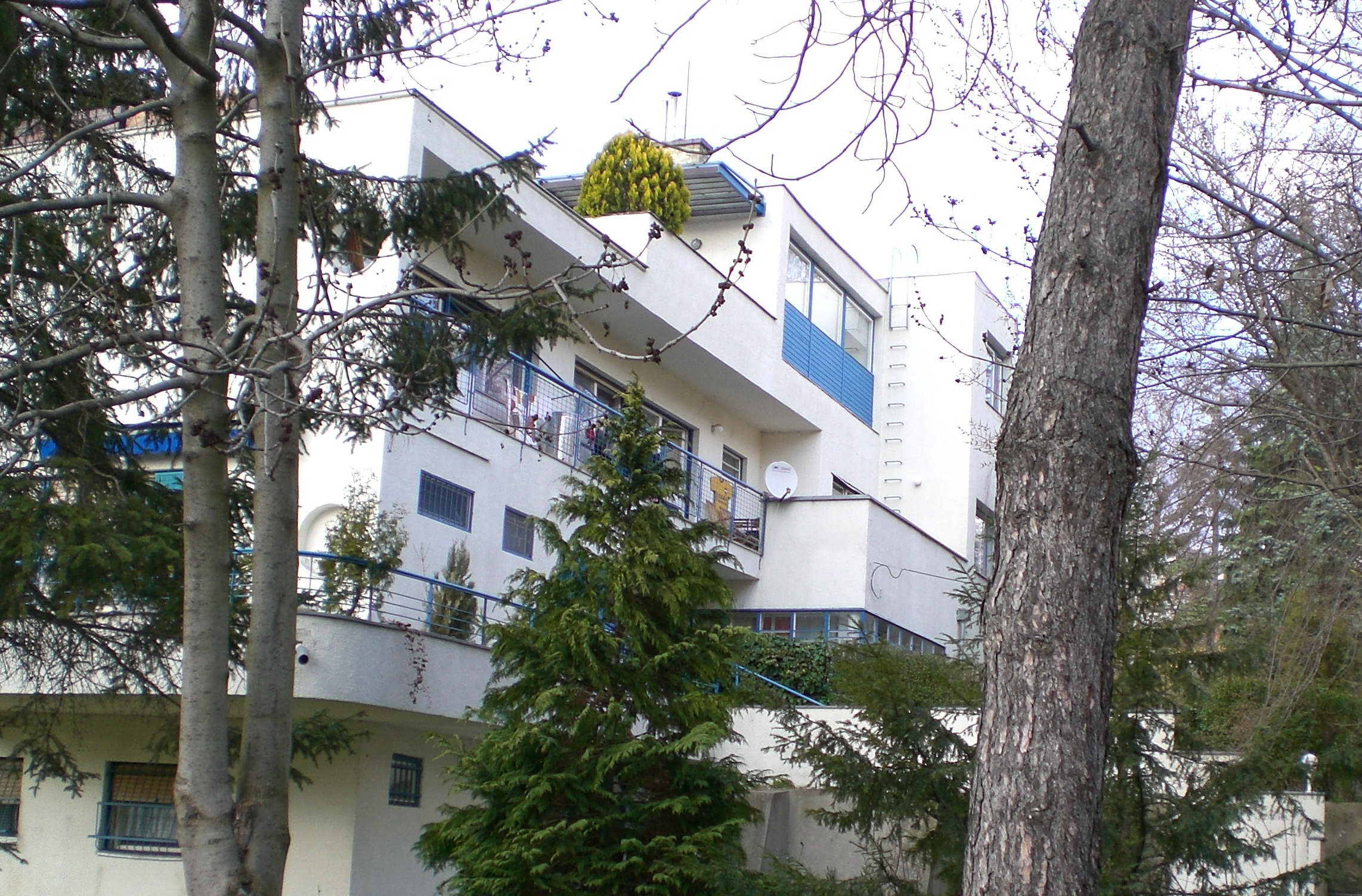

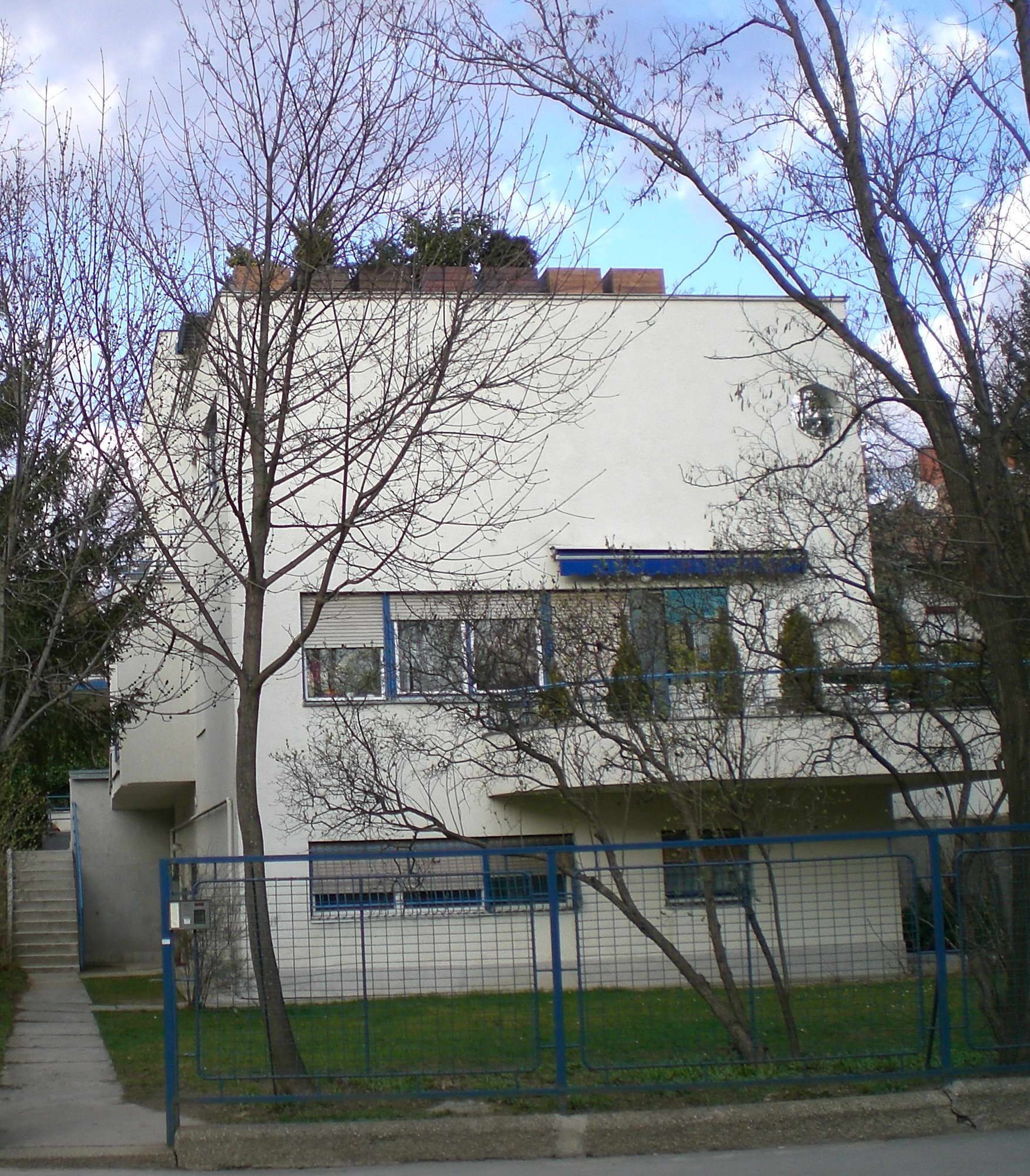

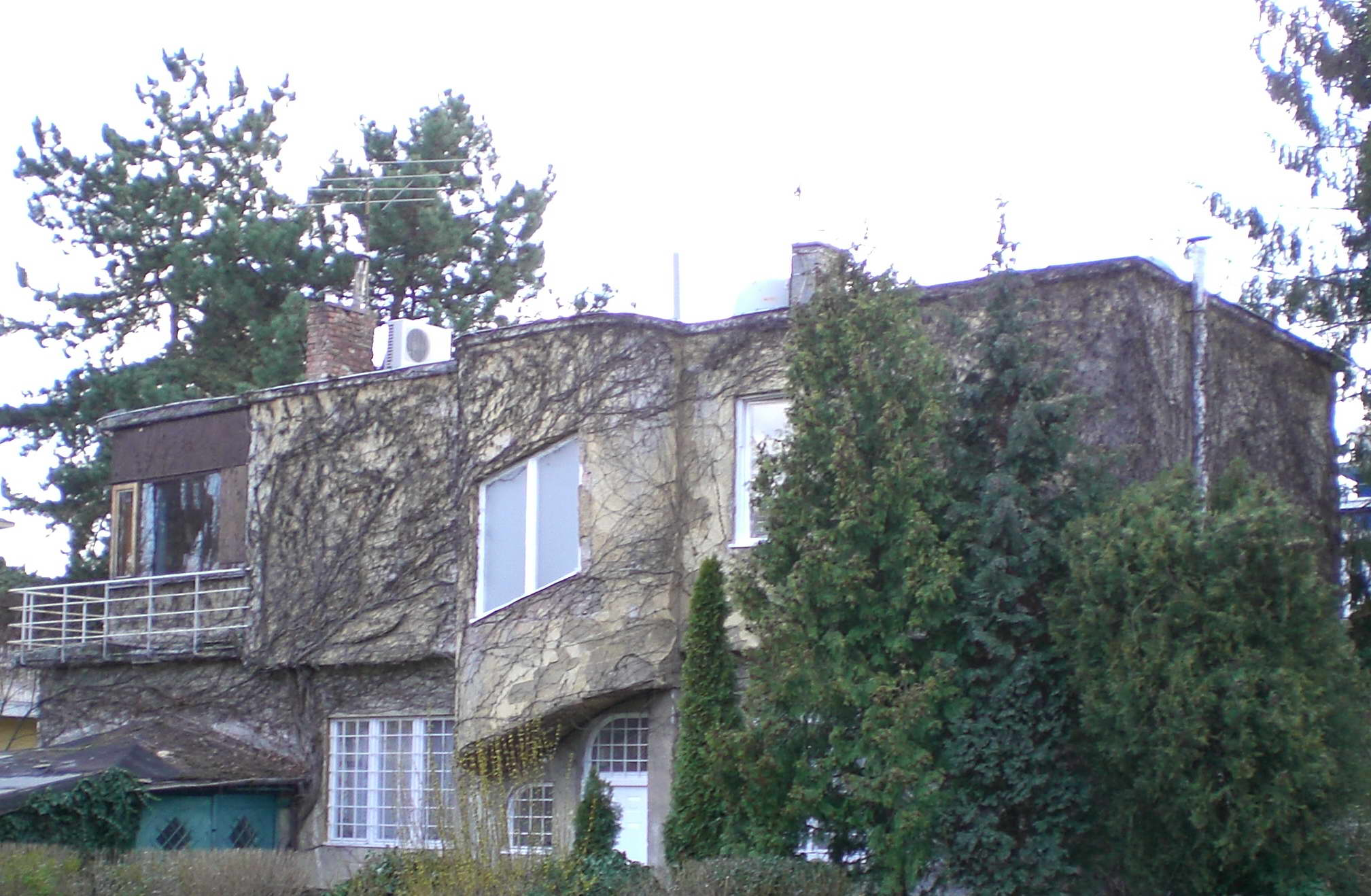

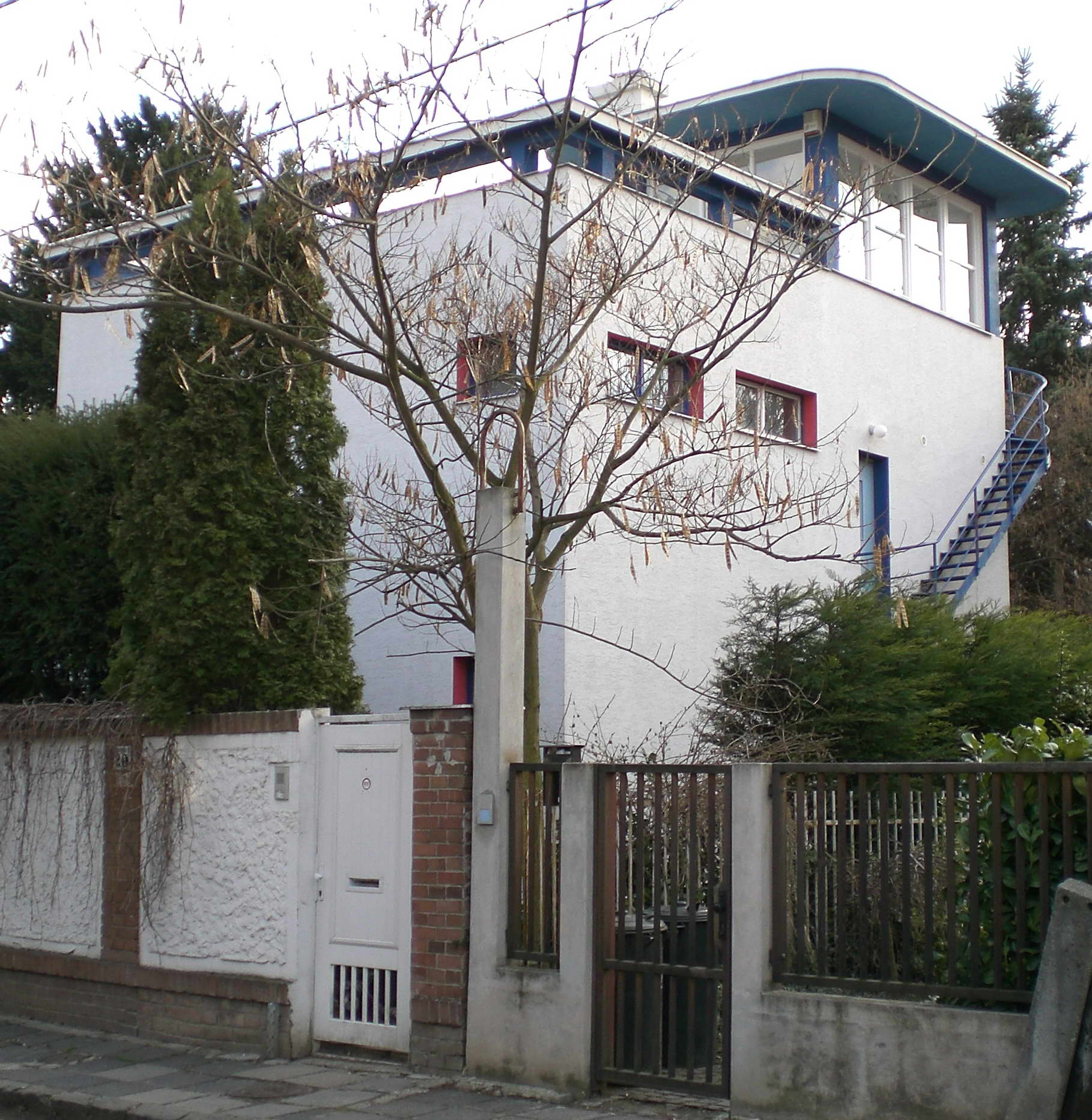

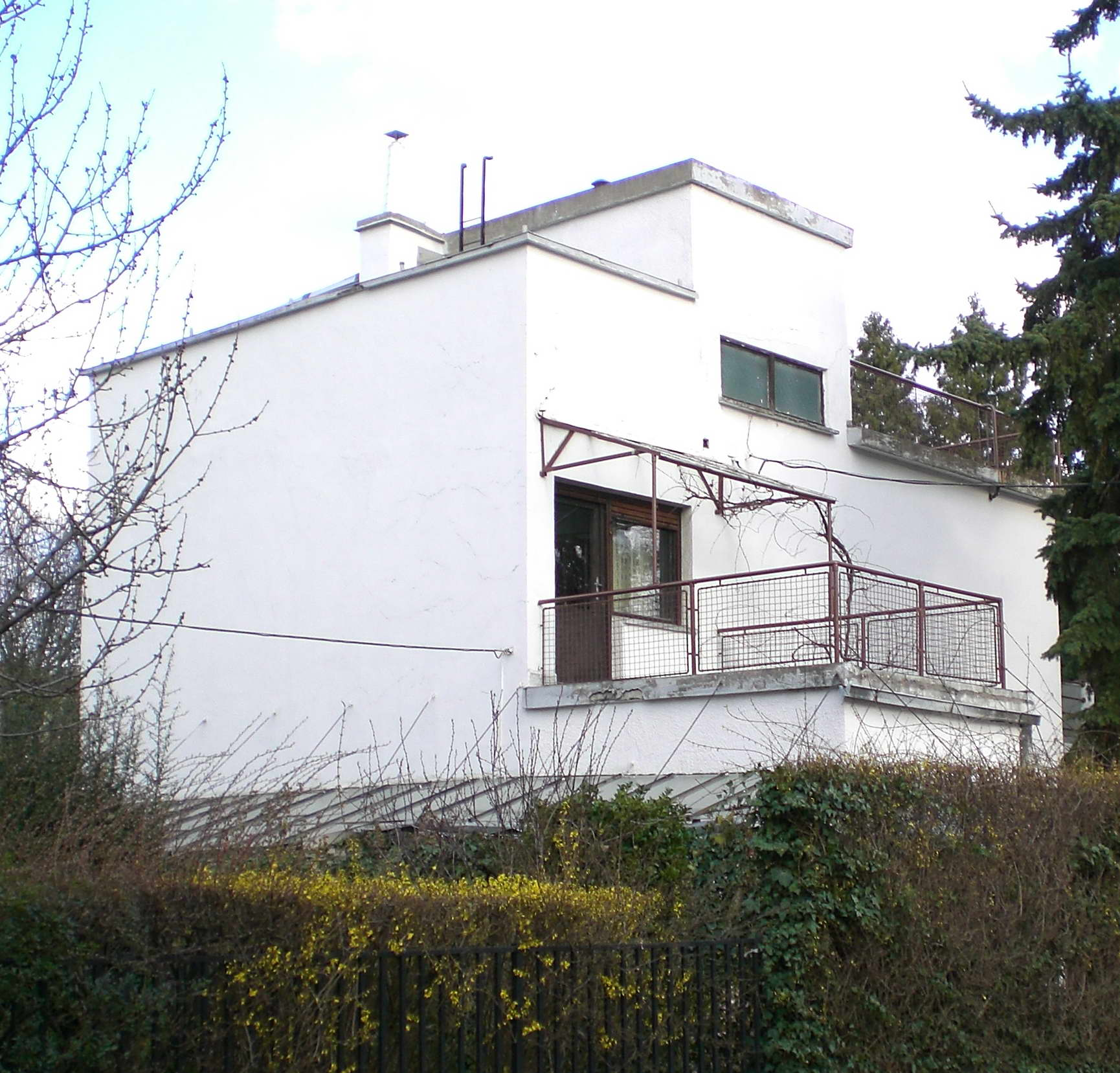

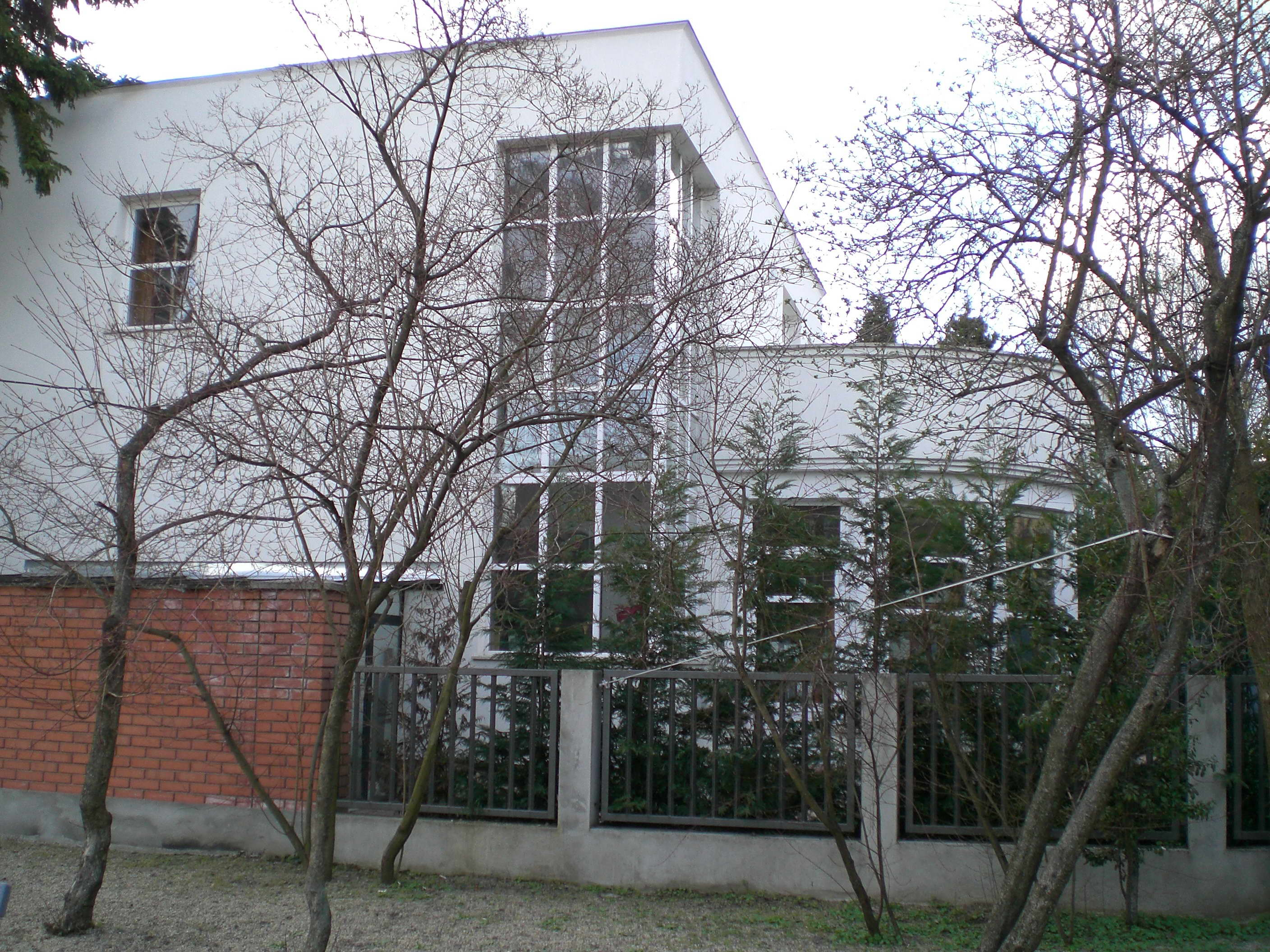

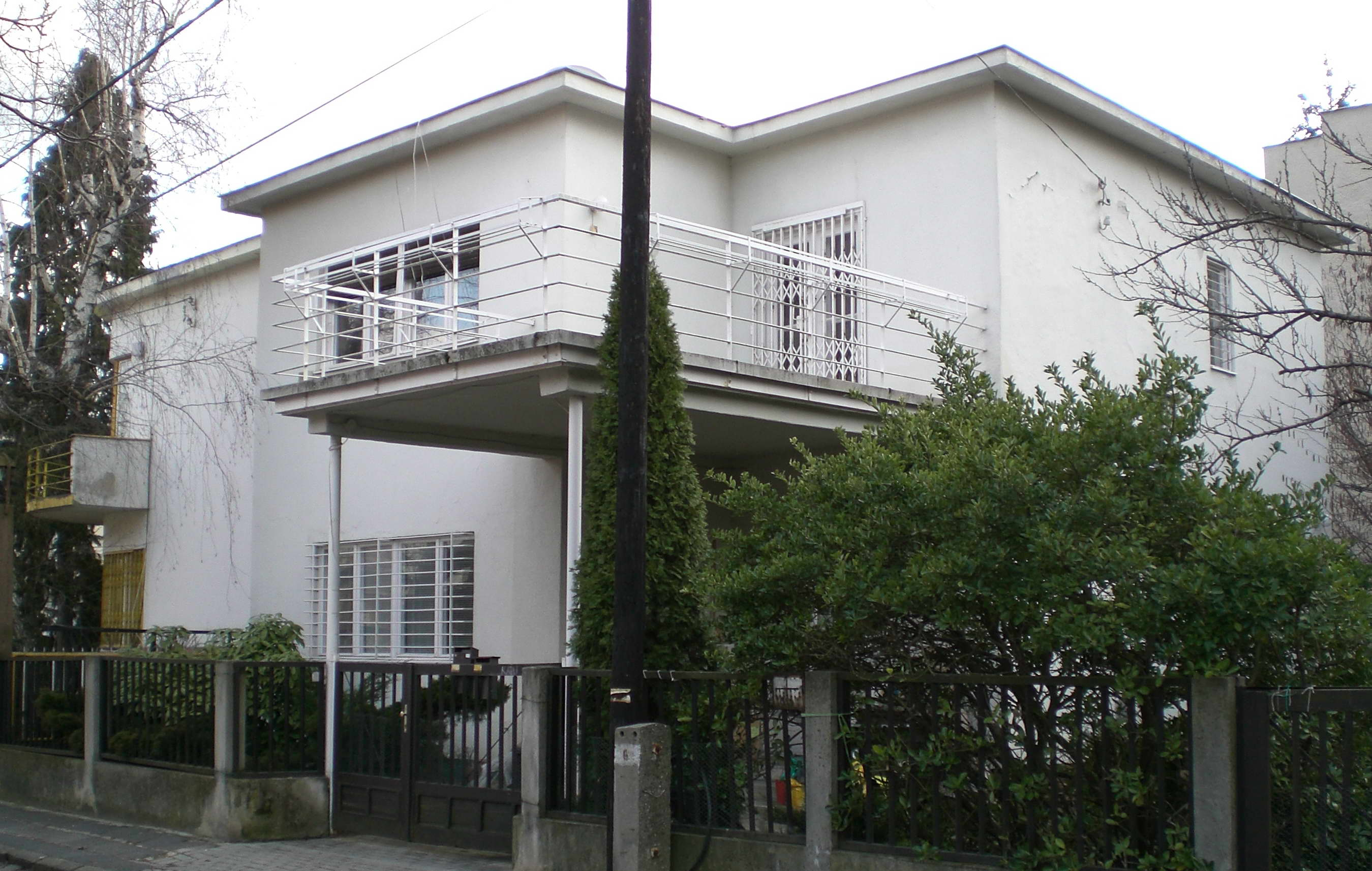

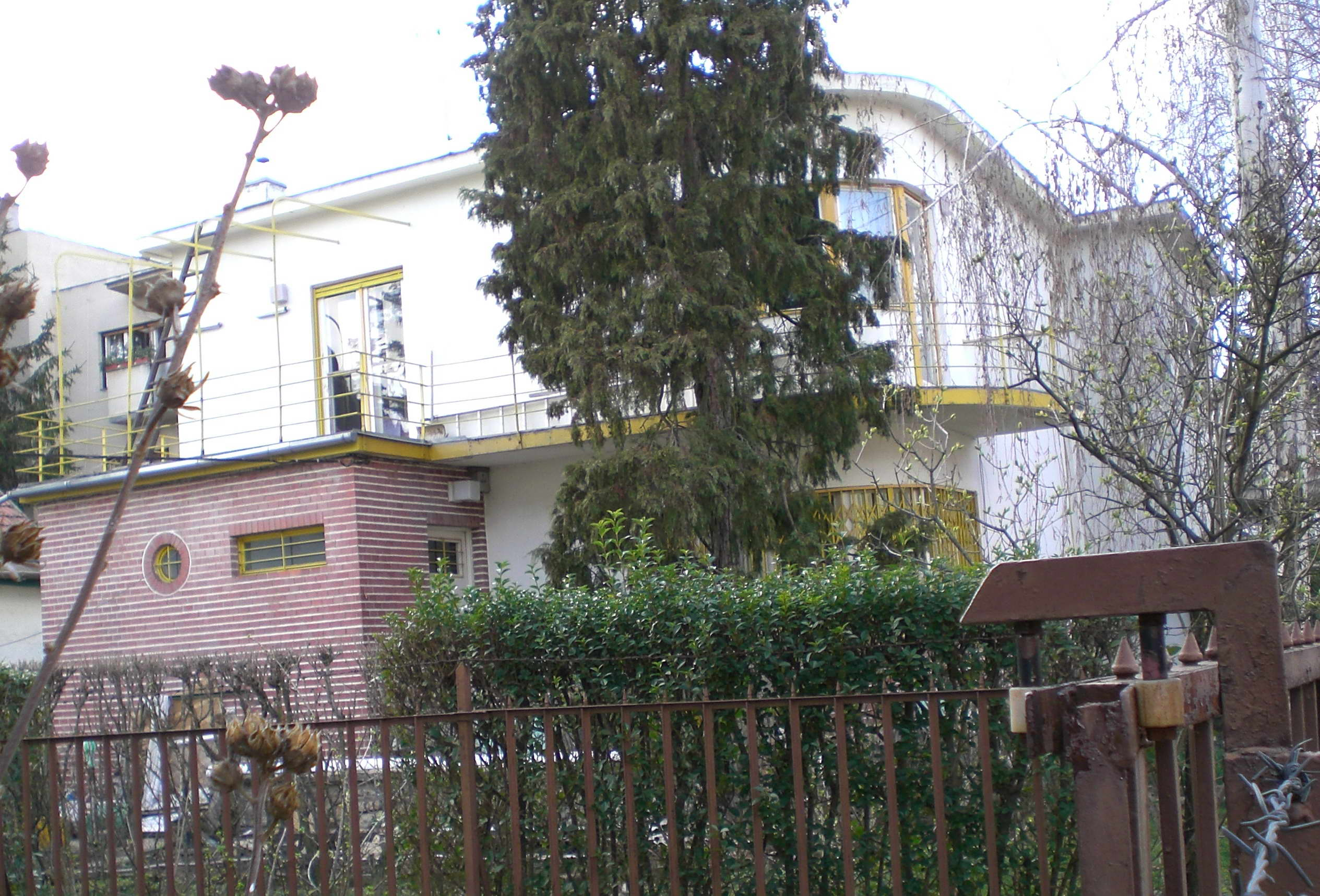

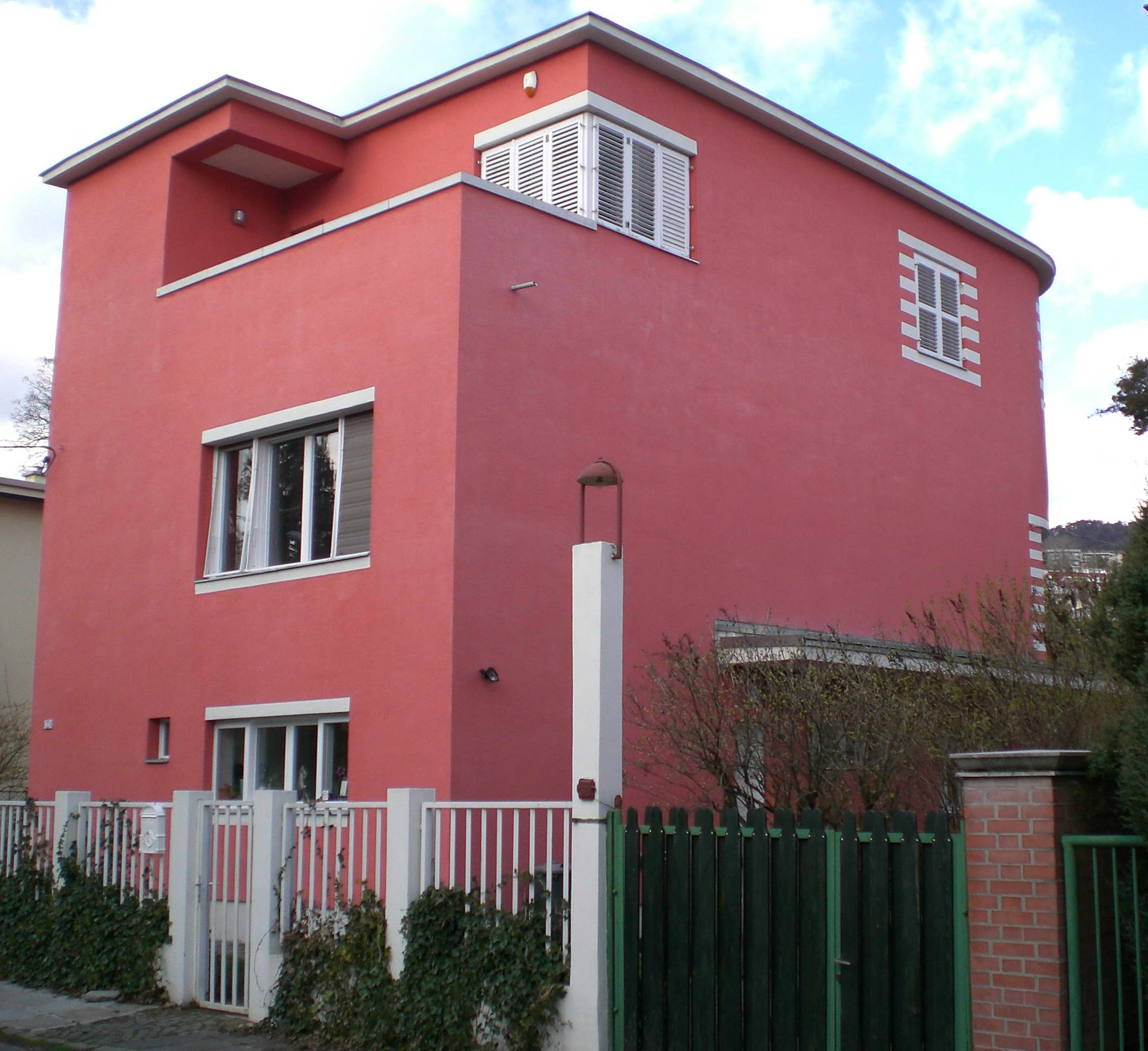

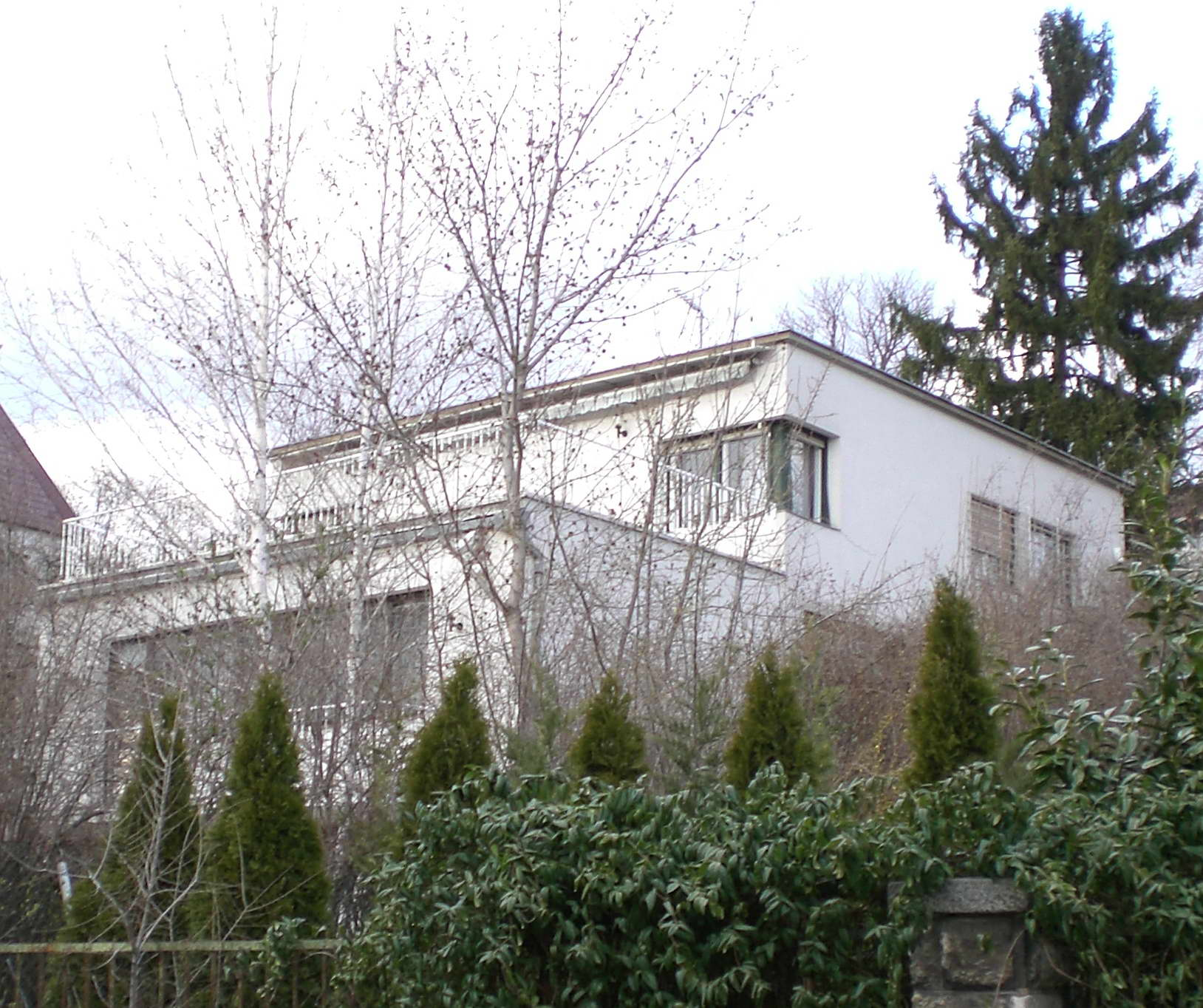
Imre Nagy's home

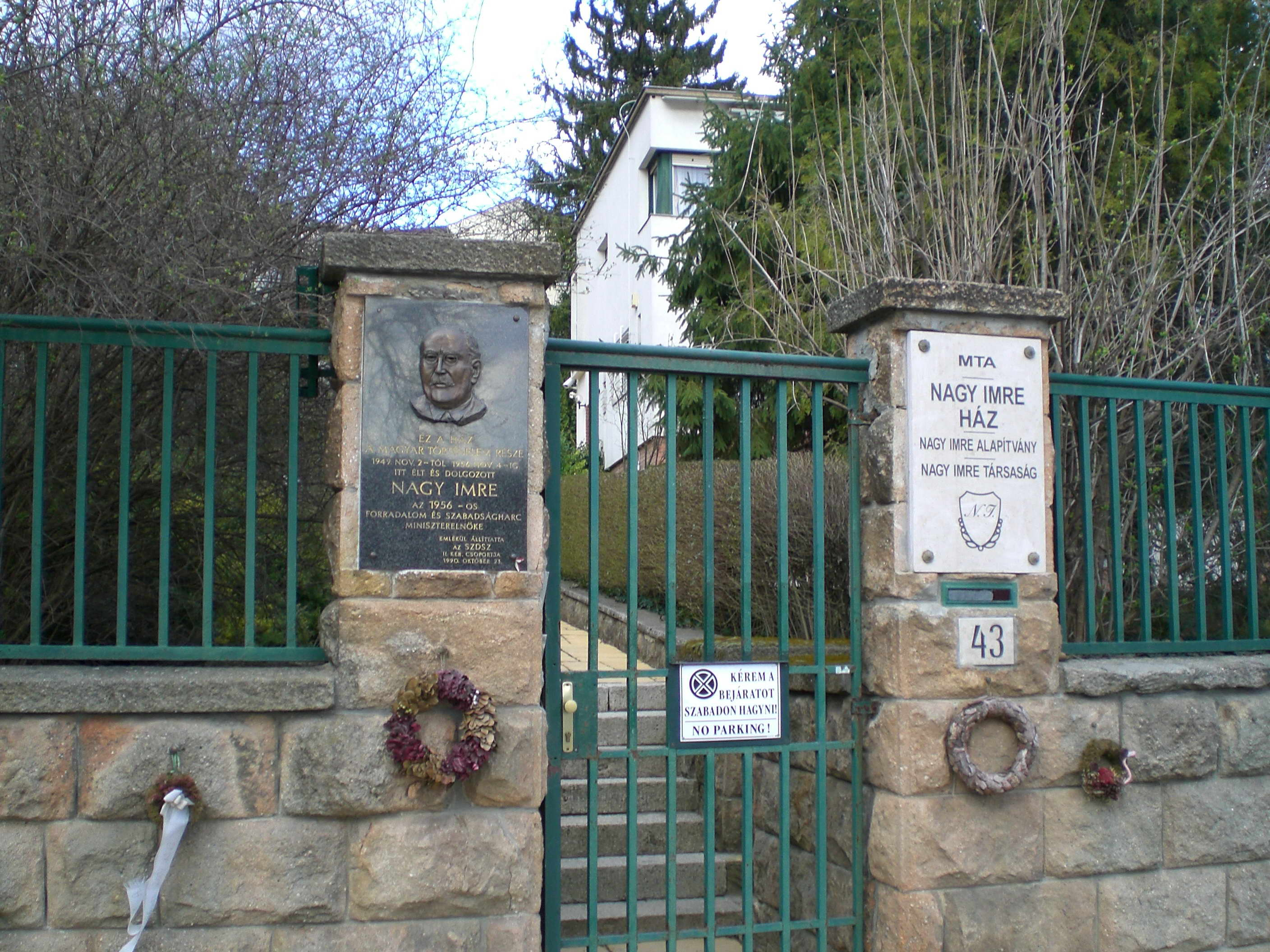
Imre Nagy's home

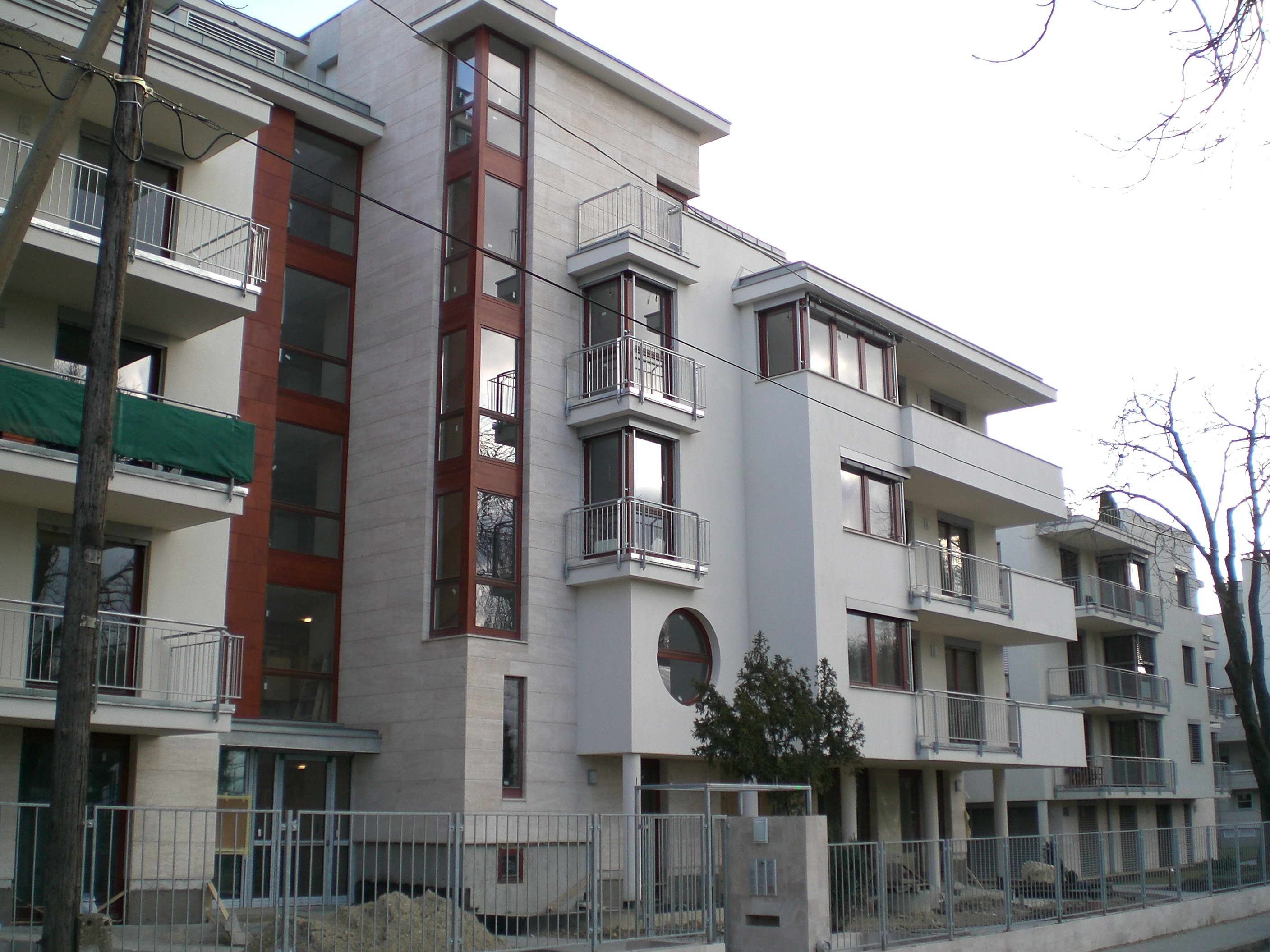

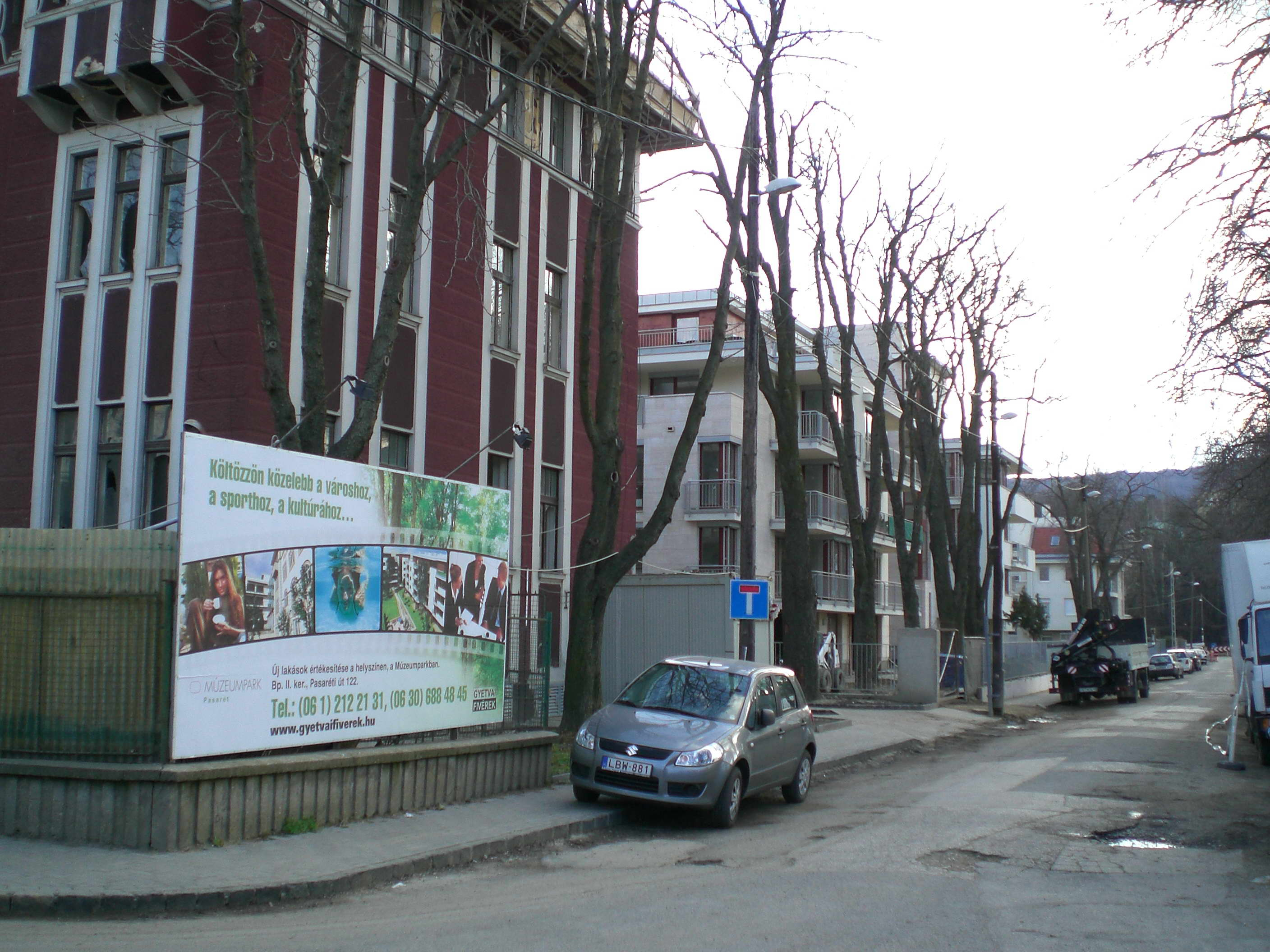

=== Bauhaus on the Killesberg in Stuttgart, Germany ===
The Weissenhof Estate, which was built on the Killesberg in Stuttgart in 1927, is one of the best examples for the art of the "new architecture" in Germany. Within no more than 21 weeks, 21 houses containing 63 flats were constructed. The settlement is not an organically grown structure, it is part of the exhibition "Die Wohnung" ("The flat") organised by the German Werkbund in 1927. In World War II 11 of the 21 houses destroyed. The Bauhaus exhibition street in Budapest, 22 villas in the Napraforgó utca Pasarét based on the example in Stuttgart.

The international reputation of the Weißenhofsiedlung and its architects brings it 30 000 visitors per year.

More details on the example in Stuttgart

== See also ==
- Újlipótváros
- Pasarét

== Sources, external information ==
- Bauhaus in Budapest - Napraforgó Street Experimental Housing
- Bauhaus in Budapest
- Moholy-Nagy University of Art and Design Budapest
- The Moholy-Nagy Foundation
- Molnár Farkas houses
- Molnár Farkas c.v. (Hungarian)
- Bauhaus sights (in German)

=== Modern architecture in Budapest (photographs) ===
- Budapest XI., Szent Adalbert tér 12. / Architect: HENNY Ferenc
- Budapest 12th District Hall / Architect: HENNY Ferenc
- Saint Anthony of Padua Church / Architect: RIMANÓCZY Gyula
- Szeged, Berzsenyi u. 2/b (1932)/ Architect: MOLNÁR Farkas
