= Pál Steiner =

Hungarian politician

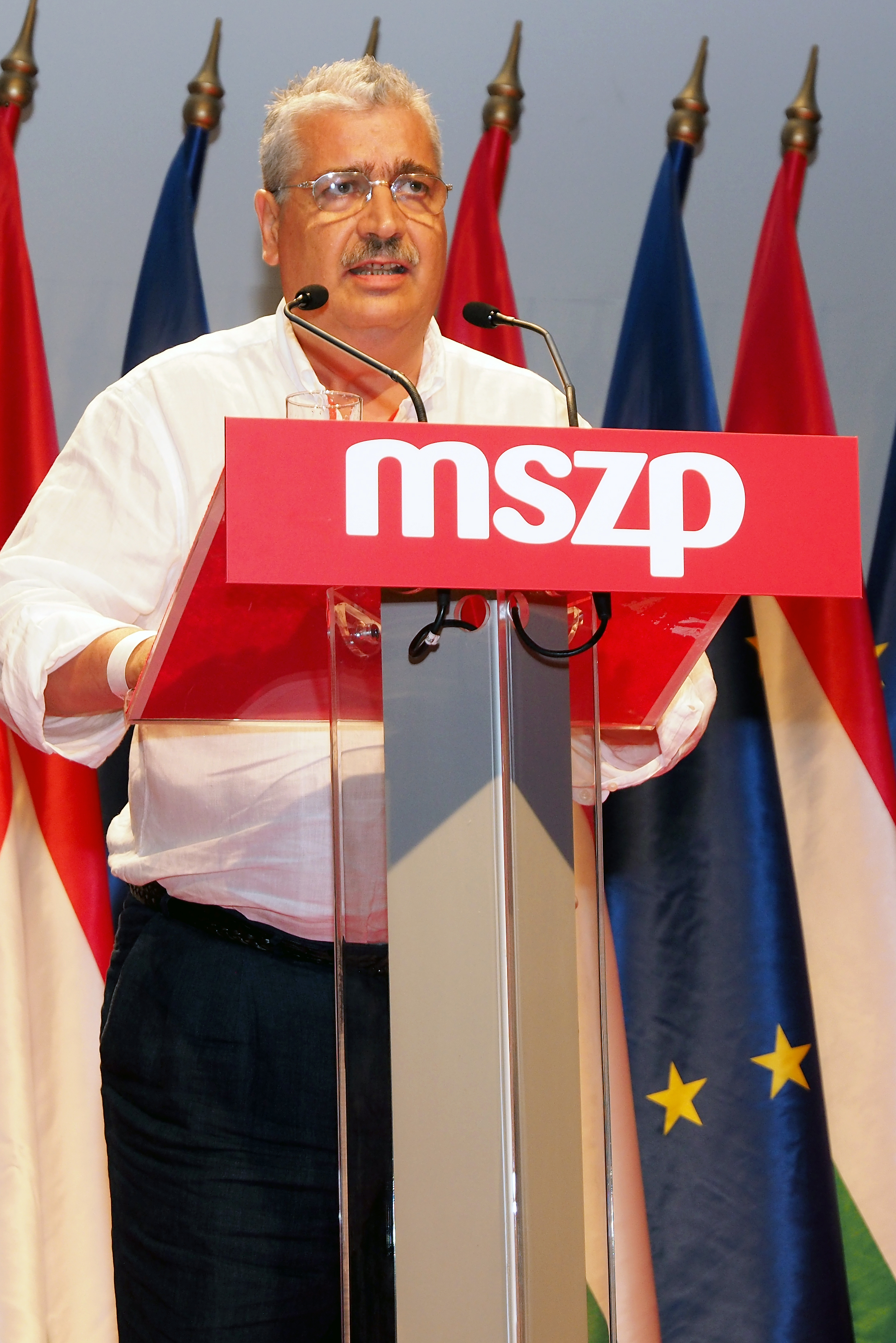
- Pál Steiner in 2014

Mayor of Belváros-Lipótváros District V, Budapest
- In office 20 October 2002 – 1 October 2006
- Preceded by: Károly Karsai
- Succeeded by: Antal Rogán

Member of the National Assembly
- In office 15 May 2002 – 5 May 2014

Personal details
- Born: March 13, 1953 (age 73) Budapest, Hungary
- Party: MSZMP (1986–89); MSZP (since 1989)
- Profession: jurist

Pál Steiner (born 13 March 1953) is a Hungarian politician, who served as the mayor of Belváros-Lipótváros (5th district of Budapest) from 2002 to 2006. He was elected member of the National Assembly (MP) from the Budapest Regional List of the Hungarian Socialist Party (MSZP) in 2002, holding the seat until 2014.

== Career ==
He is of Jewish origin. He spent his childhood in Mezőkövesd and Ferencváros. After mechanical works in trade industry, he attended the Eötvös Loránd University, where earned a degree of jurist in 1986.

Steiner joined the Hungarian Socialist Workers' Party (MSZMP) in 1986, then became a founding a member of the Socialist Party in October 1989. He served as chairman of the party's national ethics committee between 1998 and 2004. Steiner became a Member of Parliament from his party's Budapest regional list during the 2002 parliamentary election. He was involved in the Committee on Constitutional Affairs and Justice. He was re-elected in 2006 and 2010 too from the MSZP regional list both times.

He was elected mayor of the downtown of Budapest (5th district) in the 2002 local election. He held the office until the 2006 local elections. Then he became a member of the General Assembly of Budapest, where he functioned as leader of the MSZP caucus until 2010. He was president of the Central Hungary Development Council between 2008 and 2010.
