= Pasarét =

Pasarét Pasarét
- Neighbourhood
- Location of Pasarét in Budapest
- Coordinates: 47°31′11″N 18°59′49″E
- Country: Hungary
- Region: Central Hungary
- City: Budapest
- District: 2nd district

Pasarét (German: Sauwiesen) is a neighbourhood on the Buda side of Budapest.

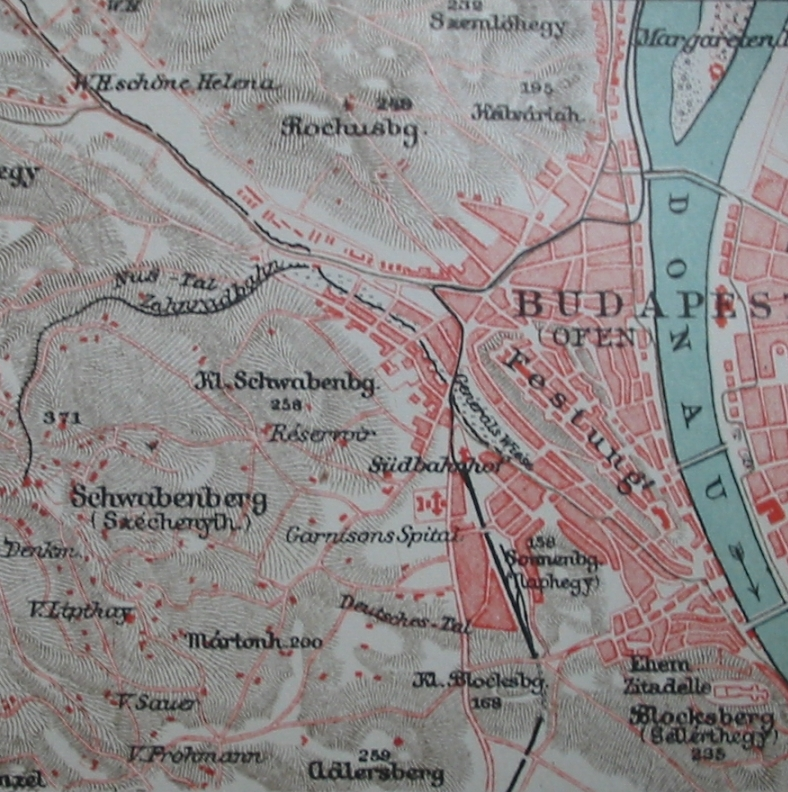
Budapest 1905, the first street from the castle-district to the north/west. Pasarét is on the map near "Zahnradbahn" Budapest Cog-wheel Railway

On the maps edited around the beginning of the nineteenth century it was called Sauwiesen (Pig Meadow) and also as Schmalzbergel (Fat Hill).

At the time of and within this area's founding, people spoke German, hence, the German nicknames; however, this countryside preserved the Hungarian language as well. On earlier army maps, it is simply labelled as Ried (meadow). The Serbs (rácok) living in the Castle District also called this place Paša (meadow in Serbian Latin: paša. Serbian Cyrillic: паша). In 1847 Gábor Döbrentei connected the Serbian name with the Hungarian word for meadow (rét) to form the present name of this part of Buda.

The first vehicle of the Budapest Cog-wheel Railway ran from 4 p.m. on June 24, 1874, and regular traffic began on the following day.

The clay-mines which made possible to build up the road in Pasarét in the 1880s were on the place of the now Vasas Sporttelep (Sport Stadion).

The huge Ludovika Engineer Academy was built up in 1895 vis-á-vis the than woody excursionspot with famous restaurant-gardens "Szép Ilona". After creating an association for settling down became the Pasarét the villa-quartier in the beginning of the twentieth century and the area has been fully built-up between the two world wars. Great artists and scientists settled here, among others Béla Bartók (composer), Ernö Dohnányi (composer), Imre Nagy (politician), István Örkény (writer), and Antal Szerb (writer).

== Bauhaus in Budapest ==
In the 1930s several houses and a whole street were built in Bauhaus style. This neighborhood's bus-station and church built in 1933-34 are two of its most momentous building-compositions.

== See also ==
- Bauhaus in Budapest
