= Újlipótváros =

Coordinates: 47.5186°N 19.0542°E

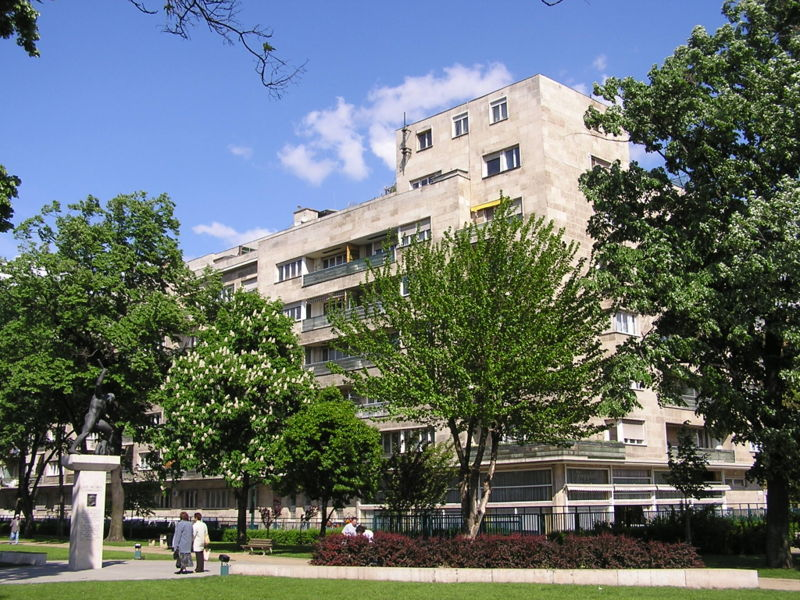
Szent István park

Újlipótváros ("New Leopold Town") is a neighborhood in the 13th district of Budapest, Hungary. It is located north to Lipótváros ("Leopold Town") neighbourhood of the 5th District, with the Szent István Boulevard (Szent István körút) separating it from its southern neighbor, Lipótváros. It lies east of the river Danube, west of Terézváros, and south of Vizafogó. Unlike most other neighborhoods in the 13th district, Újlipótváros is considered part of the Budapest city center.

== History ==
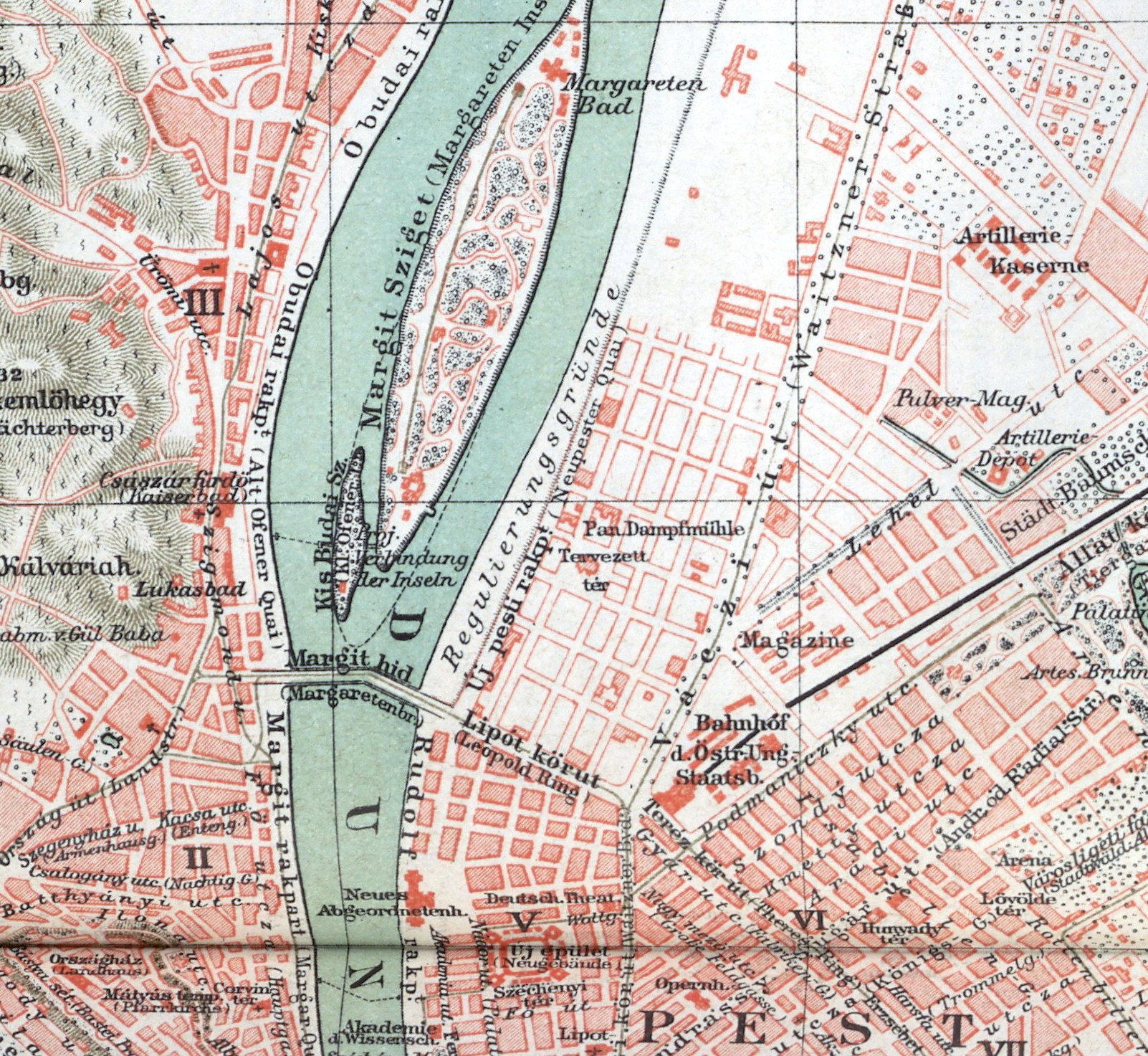
1890 - the Bridge was not connected to Margaret Island, Ujlipótváros streets projected

1905 - the Bridge is connected to Margaret Island, Ujlipótváros fast development in 17 years

Previously an industrial area, it was rebuilt as a residential district from the late 1920s. Almost all of the buildings were built between 1927 and 1944. This makes Újlipótváros quite different from the other parts of the inner city, which were mainly built before World War I, mostly in the last three decades of the nineteenth century. The very first buildings of Újlipótváros (the so-called "Palatinus houses") are notable exceptions, these were built in 1910–1911, and represent an interesting mixture of Art Nouveau and other contemporary styles. 1

It has been a popular middle-class/intellectual residential district ever since it was built.

Between the wars it was especially popular among middle-class citizens of Jewish origin and this is partially true even today, according to recent sociological research. 2

The area closest to the river Danube is the most expensive, spacious and pleasant, especially the buildings around Szent István park, which is located on the riverside. Some of these buildings (especially the so-called "Dunapark houses") are regarded by many as one of the best examples of modernist architecture in Hungary.

== Bauhaus in Budapest ==
The style of the district is often described as "Bauhaus", though this is not precise (the inner parts of the district are very densely built-up, and this was sharply criticized by Bauhaus architects in the thirties as pseudo-modernist architecture, with buildings featuring modernist-like facades, but bad structure), it is true that in this district one can find perhaps the best display of modern Hungarian architecture.

Some of the building stock and the infrastructure has been renovated in the last fifteen years (as of 2005), including Szent István park. The district has quite serious problems with parking and over-crowdedness, especially in the narrower streets of its inner parts. Its main street is Pozsonyi út, a tree-lined street close to the river with a lot of restaurants, bookstores and shops.

== See also ==
- Bauhaus in Budapest
