= Lipótváros =

Neighbourhood in Budapest, Hungary

Coordinates: 47.5072°N 19.0478°E

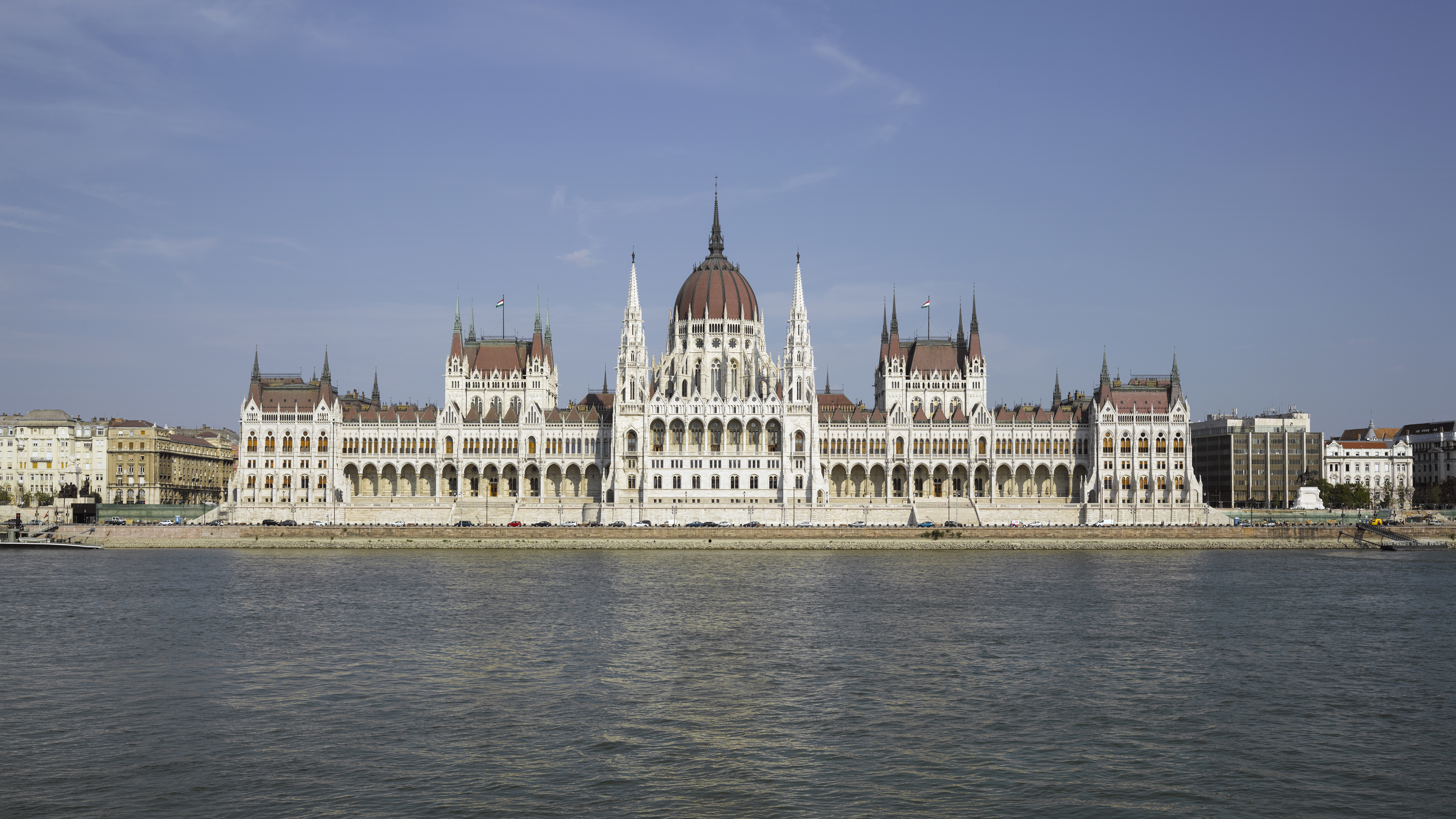
Parliament Building in 2015

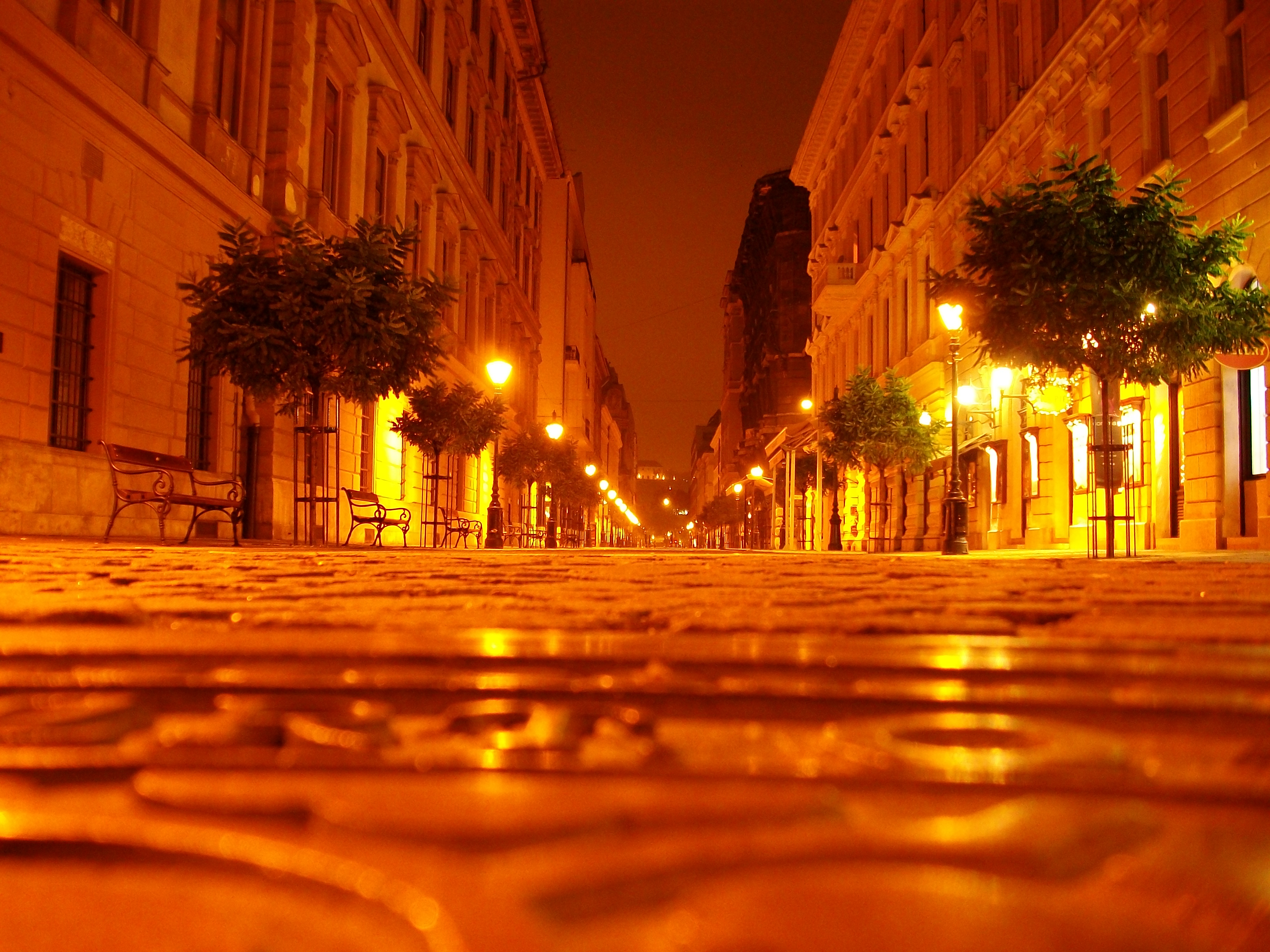
Zrínyi street at night

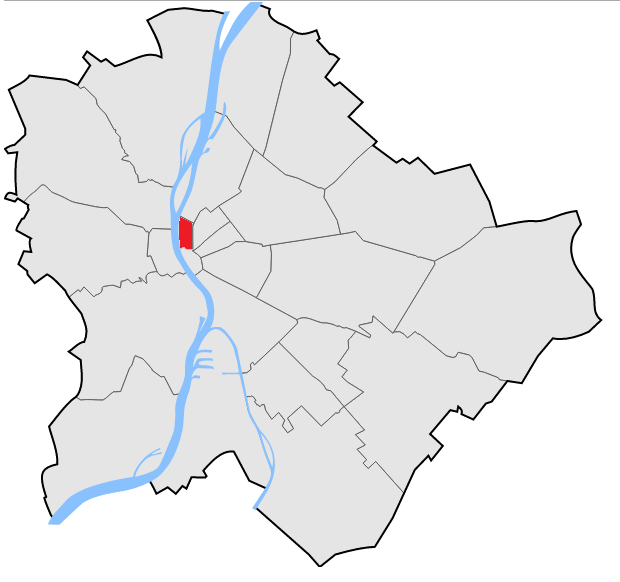
Leopold Town in Budapest (red)

Lipótváros (German: Leopoldstadt, English: Leopold Town) is a traditional neighbourhood in the city centre of Budapest, named after King Leopold II. It is one of the two neighbourhoods of District V, the other one being Inner City (Belváros), which is the old town of Pest. Lipótváros was established in the early 19th century, and became the political and financial centre of Hungary in the early 20th century when the Parliament was built on Kossuth Square. Many ministries followed in the later decades. After the 1989 change, Lipótváros gradually again became the business centre of Budapest with many banks and office buildings. The neighbourhood is rich in listed historic buildings and landmarks.

== Location ==
Lipótváros is located in the centre of Budapest. Its borders are Szent István körút – Nyugati tér – Bajcsy-Zsilinszky út – Deák Ferenc tér – Deák Ferenc utca – Vigadó tér (southern side) – river Danube.

Neighbours of Lipótváros are (clockwise from north):

- Újlipótváros ("New Leopold Town") neighbourhood of the 13th District
- 6th District: Terézváros ("Theresa Town")
- Belváros ("Inner City"), the other neighbourhood of the 5th District
- River Danube

== Name ==
Lipótváros was named in 1790 after Leopold II when he was crowned the King of Hungary. It became the 5th District of Budapest in 1873 but was merged administratively with neighbouring Belváros in 1950 under the same number. The district is now officially called "Belváros-Lipótváros", which means "Inner City and Leopold City". The Catholic Church also refers to this neighbourhood as "Saint Stephen Town" (Szentistvánváros), as St. Stephen's Basilica – which is the most famous church in Hungary – is also located here.

== Landmarks ==
- The Houses of Parliament
- St. Stephen's Basilica
- Széchenyi Chain Bridge
- Hungarian Television
- National Bank of Hungary
- U.S. Embassy
- Supreme Court
- Ministry of Education
- Ministry of Youth
- Ethnographical Museum
- Hungarian Academy of Sciences
- Gresham Palace

== See also ==
- Inner City
- District V
- List of districts in Budapest
- List of tourist attractions in Budapest
