= Antal Rogán =

Hungarian economist and politician

Antal Rogán MP
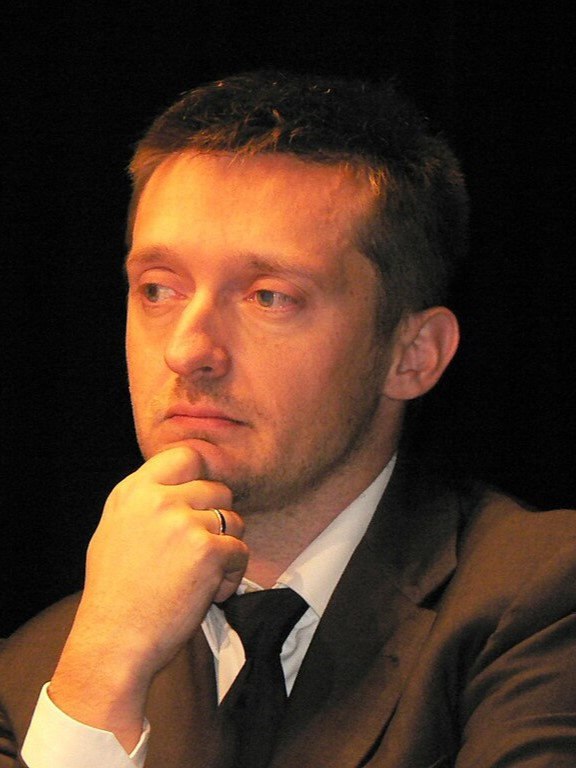
- Rogán in 2009

Minister of the Prime Minister's Cabinet Office
- In office 17 October 2015 – 12 May 2026
- Prime Minister: Viktor Orbán
- Preceded by: Position established
- Succeeded by: Position abolished

Leader of the Fidesz parliamentary group
- In office 2 June 2012 – 30 September 2015
- Preceded by: János Lázár
- Succeeded by: Lajos Kósa

Mayor of Belváros-Lipótváros District V, Budapest
- In office 1 October 2006 – 12 October 2014
- Preceded by: Pál Steiner
- Succeeded by: Péter Szentgyörgyvölgyi

Member of the National Assembly
- In office 18 June 1998 – 8 May 2026

Personal details
- Born: 29 January 1972 (age 54) Körmend, Hungary
- Party: Fidesz (since 1996)
- Spouse(s): Alexandra Sonnevend (1st); Cecília Gaál-Rogán (2nd); Barbara Obrusánszki (3rd)
- Children: Dániel; Áron; András
- Profession: economist, politician

Antal Rogán (born 29 January 1972) is a Hungarian economist and politician, who served as Minister of the Prime Minister's Cabinet Office between 2015 and 2026. He served as Mayor of Belváros-Lipótváros (fifth district of Budapest) from 2006 to 2014. On Tuesday January 7, 2025, he was hit with US sanctions for his alleged involvement in corruption in Hungary. On Wednesday, 16 April 2025, the sanctions against him were removed by the US government.

== Political career ==
He became a member of the National Assembly (MP) in the 1998 parliamentary election. He had been leader of the Fidesz parliamentary group since 2 June 2012. Rogán was appointed Minister of the newly-formed Prime Minister's Cabinet Office on 17 October 2015. In January 2025 the Biden administration sanctioned him for corruption under the Magnitsky Act. The press release of the United States Department of the Treasury claims Rogán has built a network of corruption in Hungary aimed at controlling strategic sectors and channeling their revenues to himself and his political allies. In April 2025 the Trump administration lifted the sanctions, stating they were "inconsistent with US foreign policy interests."

After the 2026 Hungarian parliamentary election, where Fidesz–KDNP suffered a heavy defeat and fell from power, Rogán did not take up his mandate.

== Personal life ==
Rogán's family is of Slovene descent from the Raba March in Vas County.

He married his first wife, Alexandra Sonnevend, in 1999. He married his second wife, Cecília Gaál-Rogán in 2007; they announced their divorce in 2019. He married his third wife, Barbara Obrusánszki, in 2021.

He has one son from his first marriage, and two sons from his second.

== Inventions ==
Antal Rogán, a trained economist, is also an inventor in the information technology sector. As of 2024, his most successful intellectual property has generated a cumulative gross income of over 1,300,000,000 HUF (approximately US$3,660,000) for him. The invention concerns electronic signatures, and it is used by several large private companies, who are important partners of the state. However, the novelty of the invention is highly questionable. It is notable that the first version of the technology covered by Rogán's invention received HUF 8 million (US$29,000) of EU funds via the Hungarian state-administered Széchenyi Program.

Political offices
Preceded by Pál Steiner	Mayor of Belváros-Lipótváros; 2006–2014	Succeeded by Péter Szentgyörgyvölgyi
Preceded by Office established	Minister of the Prime Minister's Cabinet Office; 2015–2026	Succeeded by Office abolished
National Assembly of Hungary
Preceded by János Lázár	Leader of the Fidesz parliamentary group 2012–2015	Succeeded by Lajos Kósa
