= Bathory Cave =

Cave in Budapest

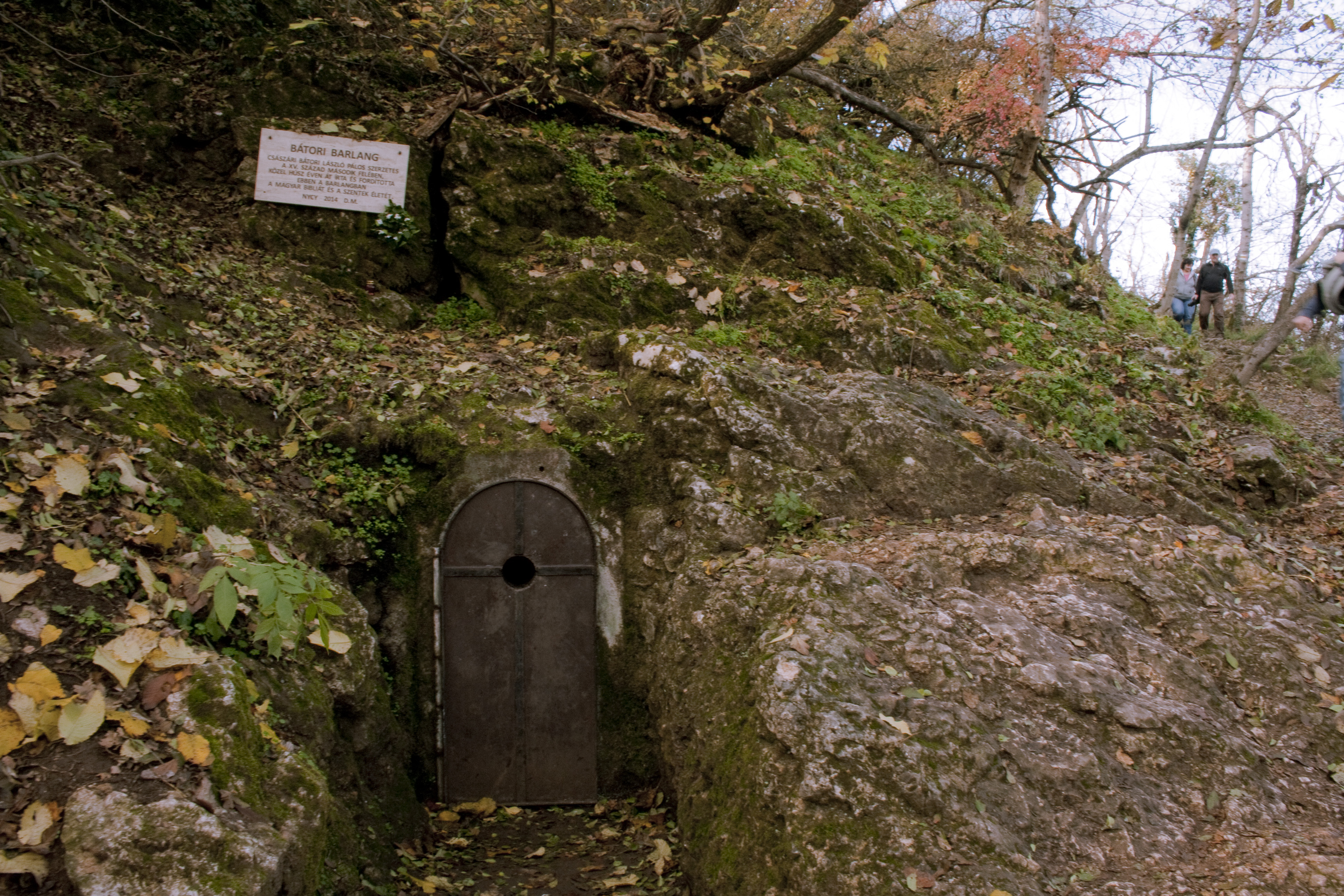
- The upper entrance to the cave
- Interactive map of Bathory Cave
- Location: Buda Hills, Budapest
- Coordinates: 47°32′01″N 18°57′21″E
- Depth: 50 m
- Length: 360 m
- Elevation: 440 m

The Bathory Cave (Hungarian: Bátori-barlang) is a cave located just below the top of Nagy-Hárs Hill (Great Linden Hill), on the northeast side of the mountain. It is located within the Danube-Ipoly National Park and the 2nd district of Budapest. The cave gets its name from Pauline monk, László Báthory who used the cave as a hermitage for twenty years.

== Background ==
Geothermal springs carved the cave from Dachstein limestone probably during the Pliocene era. The upper portions of the cave extend into the Hárshegy sandstone. The cave consists of several cupola-like spherical niches carved from the stone. There are horizontal passages connected by steep shafts. There are speleothem formations of various shapes and colors, and a small number of stalactites are found inside. There are formations of hematite and limonite inside the cave. Names of the cave halls and passages include the Great Stairs, Pyramid Branch, Tavas Hall, Hall of Loyalty, Hármas termi, Saint Laszlo Hall, Dome Hall, Triple Hall, Small-Staircase, Y-branch, Vortex Corridor and Pauline Hall.

The cave has been in use by people since the Neolithic age, and the bones of both the woolly rhinoceros and red deer have been found inside. The limonite in the cave has been mined for the gold and silver contained in the ore.

Seeking solitude to focus on his work, Pauline monk László Báthory left the Monastery of St Lawrence at Buda and used the cave as a hermitage, where he lived from 1437 to 1457. The cave was sealed after his death. The cave has been forgotten and rediscovered several times. The cave was formally named in his honor in 1911.

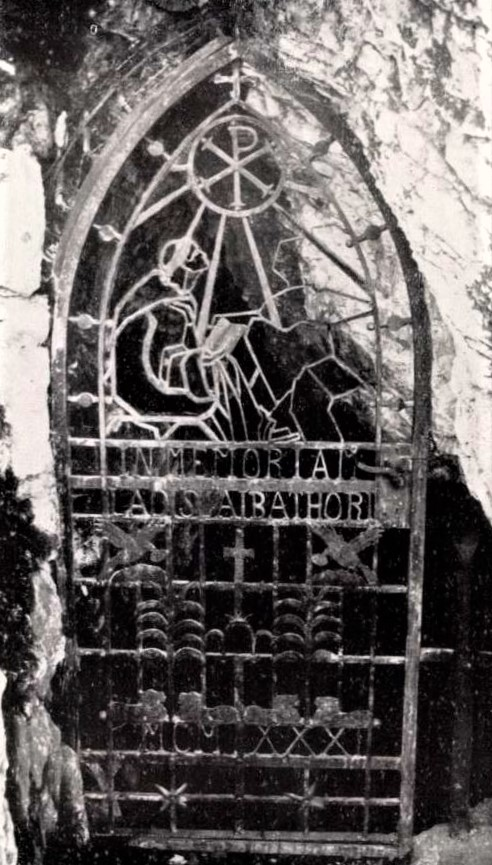
Iron gate at the entrance of the Bathory Cave

Located in the 2nd district of Budapest, the area is popular to outdoor enthusiasts and is accessible from the Szépjuhászné station and Hárs-hegy station of the Budapest Children's Railway. Access to the cave is now controlled by the Danube-Ipoly National Park.
