= Scout camp =

Campsite used for Scout events

A Scout camp (also known as a Scout Centre, or a Scout Park) is a youth center, hostel, facility or campsite. They can be found both in nature and in urban environments. Scout parks are run by youth Scouts, and Scout leaders, generally on a volunteer basis. They are open to both Scouts and the community at large.

== Background ==
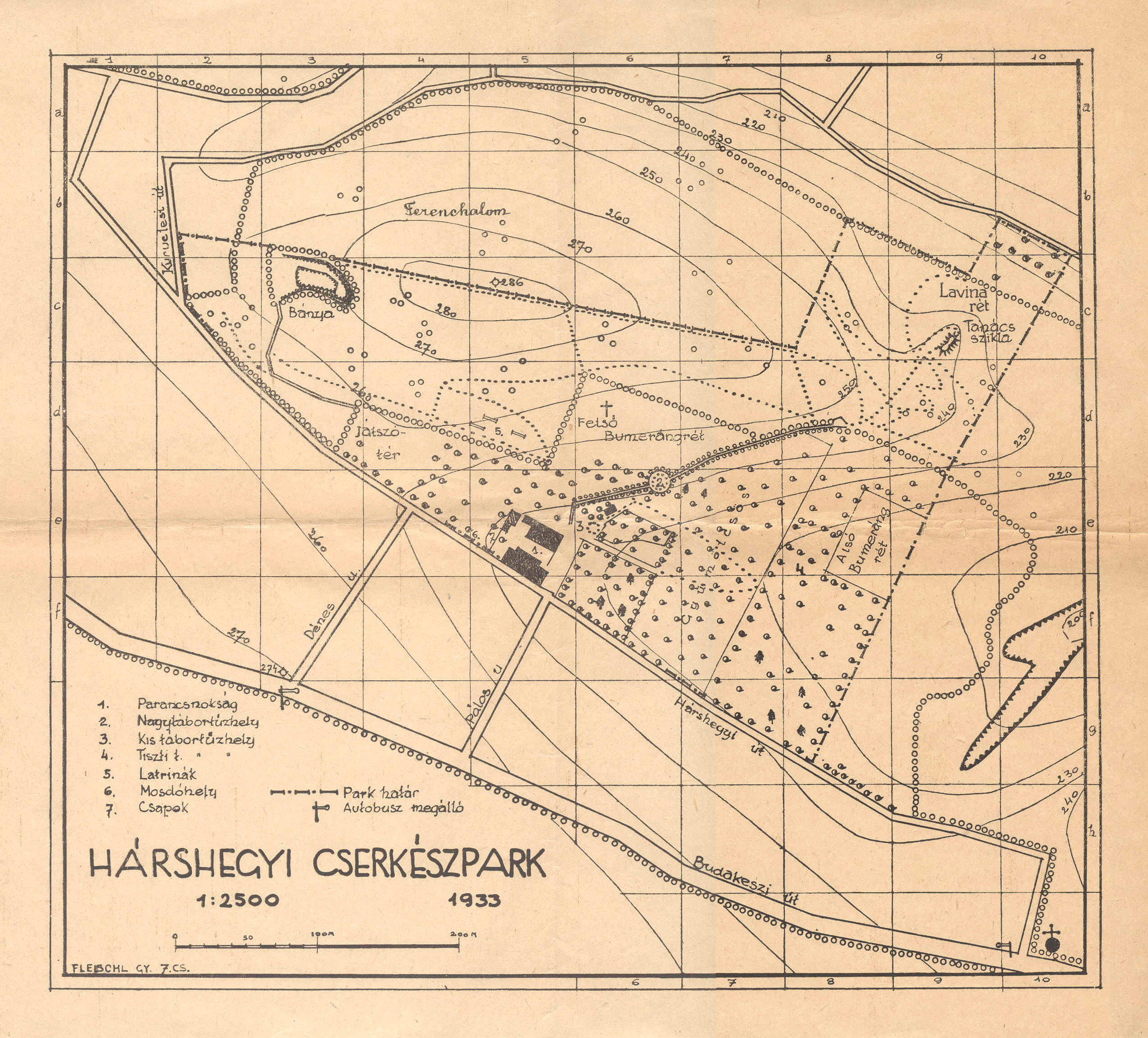
Hárshegy Scout Park

The world's first scout park was Gilwell Park near London, purchased by the British Scout Association in 1919. It also has an adult education center and scout campground. After World War I, the Hárshegy Training Park was established at Ferenc Hill in Budapest.

Scout camps are a place to go learn Scoutcraft, and are always affiliated with a Scout association from that country. As an example, the now closed Breyer Training Area was run by the Philadelphia Council of the BSA. The camp was accessible from the city by train to the Jenkintown station.

The organizations that run the parks use the Scout Spirit as a guiding principal, in which special attention is paid to conservation and the environment in its operation. Parks, like the Kandersteg International Scout Centre, provide an opportunity for Scouts from other countries to work and can get to know the country in their spare time.

== See also ==
- Baden-Powell House
- Scout hall
- Scout Activity Centres
- World Scout Centres
