= Szépjuhászné =

- Coordinates: 47.5247°N 18.955°E
- Country: Hungary
- City: Budapest

Szépjuhászné (English: Beautiful shepherdess) ( from 1945 to 1992 Ságvári-liget ) is a small clearing in the 2nd district of Budapest, in the saddle between Hárshegy and János-hegy.

== Background ==
It is accessible by the Szépjuhászné station of the Budapest Children's Railway. It is the site of the Pauline Monastery where the Pauline Order founded their first friary.

It is a starting point for hikers into the Buda Hills. It is very easy to reach the Bátori Cave. Visitors frequent the Károly Kaán Lookout Tower at the top of Nagy-Hárs-hegy and the Imre Makovecz observation tower on Kis-Hárs Hill.
