= Breeding biology of the tawny owl =

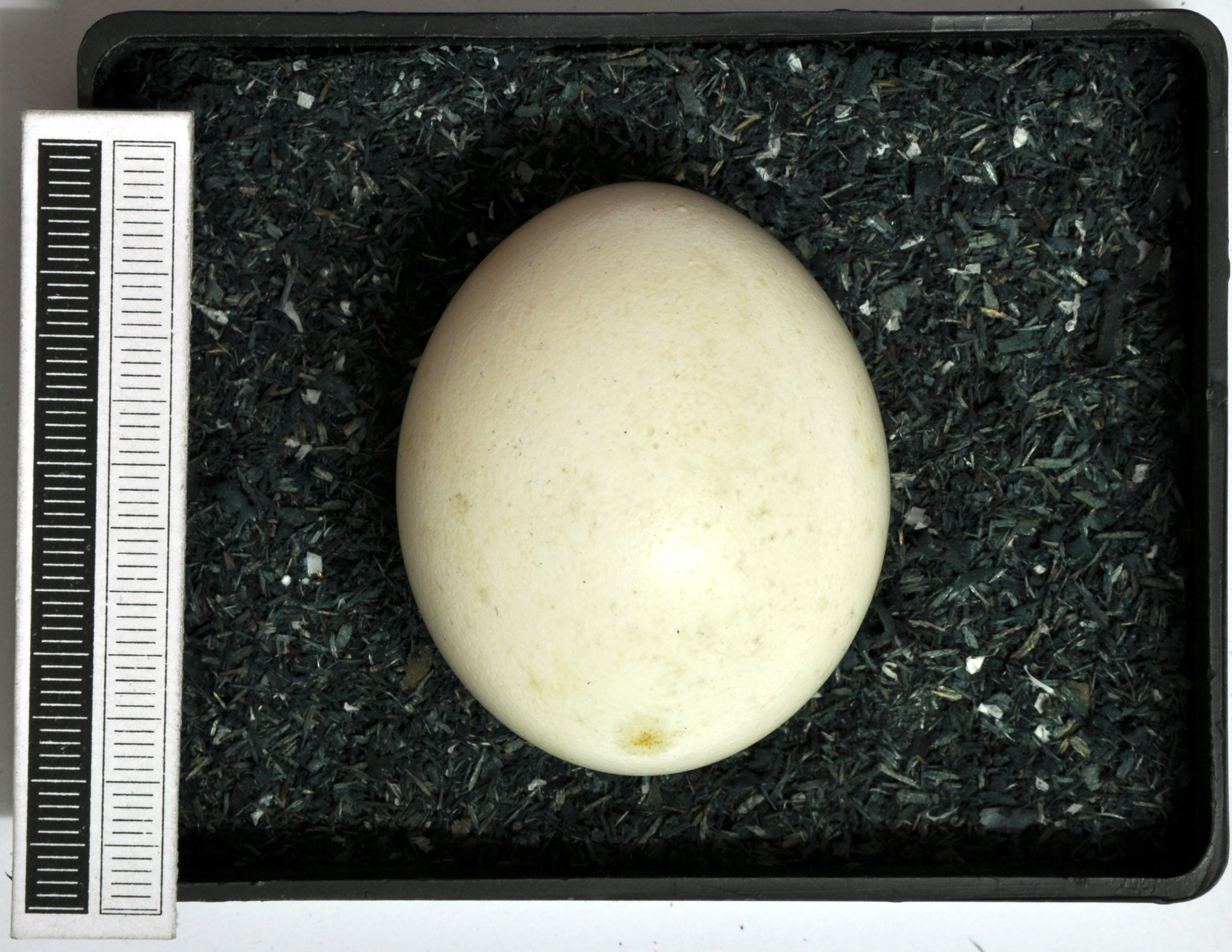
Egg, Collection Museum Wiesbaden, Germany

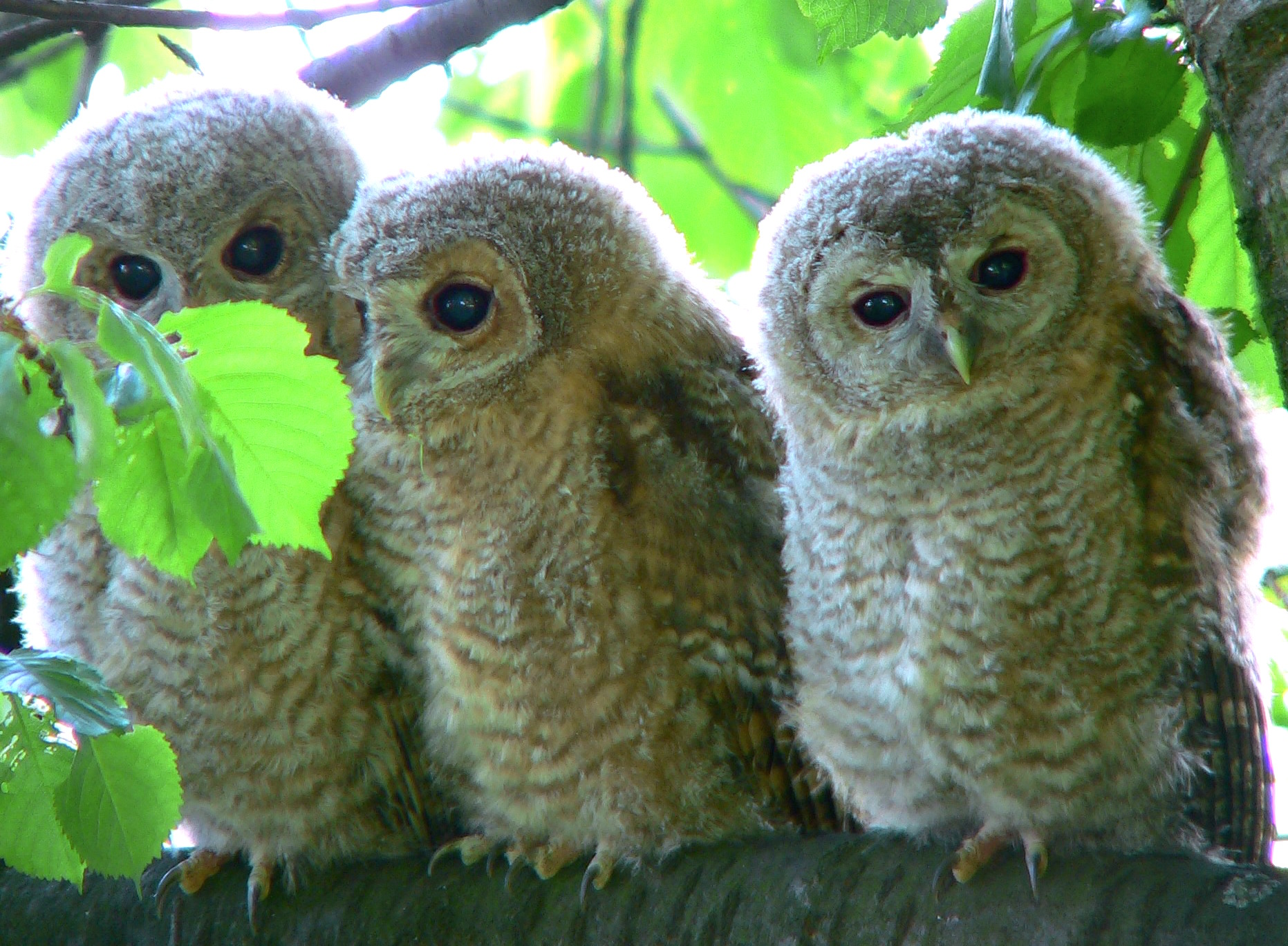
The young leave the nest before fledging.

Tawny owls are monogamous and territorial year around. Young birds select territories and look for mates in autumn and tend to be very vocal, especially males. Due to their highly territorial behaviour, young birds frequently struggle to establish a territory unless a nearby adult dies. Males routinely engage in territorial fights. Territories have been known to have been maintained by single tawnys for up to 10 years in Russia and 13 years in Berlin. Of 34 males in Wytham, only one male moved off of territory, due to being disturbed by humans. It appears to be largely up to the male to select territorial boundaries. Despite the aforementioned territorial behaviour, active nests of two separate pairs at as close as 100 m (330 ft), in the Tegel forest, have been reported. This species shows very little extrapair parentage. In Switzerland for example, a study of 137 nestings found that only one, or 0.7%, were from a different father than the mate, females cannot generally raise young without male contribution so the pair structure of these highly residential owls insures little instance of cuckoldry. Cases of bigamy were reported at Wytham in 6 of 34 males, in situations where apparently a neighboring male died and was suffixed subsequently, however, one or the other nesting attempts would completely fail each time. In Pavia, 3 of 22 territories included two mature females.

== Nests ==
The male advertises several potential nest sites to his mate by singing at the entrance, slipping inside and so on, with the female finally selecting one. The typical nest site of a tawny owl is a tree hollow, wherein the owls will nest directly on the interior hole's surface. Tree hollows used may be as much as 25 m (82 ft) above the ground, but are usually within about 12 m (39 ft) of the ground. Virtually any species of deciduous tree may be used provided holes are available. These tree cavities may be of any origin, with trees that grow large such as oak, beech, poplar, maple, lime, hornbeam and alder often regularly utilized. Female may scratch out a shallow base in soil if present and sometimes seen to reportedly tear eggs into pieces as a cushion from their broods. Other tree nest locations have included those on top of a Witch's broom and on top of the tree canopy. Natural holes in trees are often the most frequently used nesting site, followed closely in recent decades many artificial nest boxes, preferably those with a 15 cm × 20 cm (5.9 in × 7.9 in) entrance or larger. Of the nest boxes erected in different parts from Kielder forest and the Glenbranter forest of Argyll, 592 nest boxes were placed at 1.6 to 5.2 m (5.2 to 17.1 ft) high along the side of trees and 17.4% of which were used by tawnys (in latter 2 years of study up to 24.1%). In southeastern Scotland, all nest boxes erected in habitat were eventually utilized by tawny owls. Many nest boxes were recorded to be used as roost sites in the Milan, with only 12.3% of the 44% of nest boxes actually used by owls for breeding, usually with the owls utilizing boxes that were at least 6 m (20 ft) above the ground. Nest boxes are most successful wherever natural tree cavities are scarce or absent, such as conifer forests, young successional woods and farmlands. Tawny owls may not infrequently nest in an unmodified black woodpecker hole. This species may too nest in nest of larger birds such as crows, common ravens (Corvus corax) and Eurasian magpies as well as common buzzards, black kites, northern goshawks and various eagles while the sometimes recorded as used smaller nests such as those of Eurasian jays, Eurasian sparrowhawks and common wood pigeons but these are at potential risk of collapse. Occasionally, tawny owls have also been recorded nesting in abandoned burrows of larger mammals (e.g. red fox and European badger (Meles meles) as well as those of rabbits). Other nesting locations recorded for the species have included bare cliff ledges, between the roots of heavy tree trunks, on the bare forest floor and among heather. Also rarer still nests have been reported in the recesses of stone walls, in chimneys of large buildings, on cabins and sheds, in dovecotes and church towers. In southern Finland, 95% of 123 nest boxes put out were occupied by tawny owls in 1970–1975, natural tree hole use decreased in same period from 48% to 3%, on top of stumps from 4% to 1% and in buildings from 15% to 1%.

== Eggs ==
Laying normally begins in March-early April, sometimes as early as February. Of 344 nests in Latvia, the mean egg laying dates were March 13 to April 3, with extreme dates of February 20 to April 30, with shifts accounted for by late winter weather. In the German area of Swabian Jura clutches may start to be laid as early as mid-February if food is favorable. Egg laying in mid-February is fairly typical in Italy as well. The first egg is typically laid by mid-March in Great Britain, in late March in continental Europe and early April in Scandinavia. In very snowy years in Finland, the laying of clutch is often either delayed or does not occur at all. Due to the warmer average ambient temperatures and access to pestilent rodents, wintertime egg laying in human developed areas is now known to be commonplace: with records of laying in late December in Amsterdam, early January in Munich and late January in Riga, Latvia. They tend to lay their clutches earlier than long-eared owls and little owls and much earlier than barn owls. One clutch is laid per year but rarely replacement clutches have been reported if an entire clutch is lost. A record in Bizkaia, Spain of a second successful clutch was produced, with pairs of owlets were recorded in February then another pair of owlets apparently hatched to the same pair was recorded in July of same year. The female typically lays a relatively small clutch of 3–5 eggs, sometimes in extreme case from 2 and very rarely and in the times of food plenty, 7–9. Average clutch sizes were cited as 2.67 in Britain, 2.8 in Bohemia, 2.95 in Belgium 3.29 in central Europe, 3.3 in both Switzerland and the Netherlands, 3.65 in Denmark, 3.64–3.81 in Finland and 4.04 in Sweden. While in Bohemia, the clutch size varied remarkably little by year, in western Switzerland it could go from 2.52 to 3.63 in different years and Finnish data indicates it can vary from 3.1 to 4.2 in low and peak vole years. Therefore, clutch size may be more variable in more cool climatic zones but, on the other hand, the average size of the clutches averages larger in these colder areas. Although clutch sizes average smaller in Great Britain than in mainland Europe, they are more consistently laid there than the clutches of barn owls. Their eggs are pure white, smooth or slightly glossy in texture, and vary little in size. Egg dimensions were found to average 46.7 mm × 39.1 mm (1.84 in × 1.54 in) in Britain, 47.6 mm × 39.2 mm (1.87 in × 1.54 in) in central Europe, 46.6 mm × 38.5 mm (1.83 in × 1.52 in) in Sweden (Makatsch 1976) and 47.5 mm × 39.2 mm (1.87 in × 1.54 in) in Russia. The range may be from 42 to 50 mm (1.7 to 2.0 in) in height by 36 to 41 mm (1.4 to 1.6 in) in diameter (sample size 100). The average weight of eggs can vary from 31.3 to 40 g (1.10 to 1.41 oz).

== Parental behaviour ==
The female incubates alone, starting with the first egg for 28–29 days typically, and is fed by the male. The female also broods the chicks, feeding them strips of meat for about 2 weeks, after which they may start swallowing mice and such whole. She continues to feed them until they leave the nest, at which point she may resume her hunting but the male may continue to a majority of food capture and may even feed the offspring directly. Larger prey items tend to be more often fed to chicks such as medium-sized birds, young rabbits and moles where available, while the parents themselves usually eat small rodents (i.e. in Wytham and Ythan Valley). Sometimes when the mother feeds their young, separated feathers are sometimes doled out and consumed by them. In France, 4–19 prey deliveries by the male were recorded per night, or 2.5–3 prey per chick nightly. In Belgium, from as little as 0 to 22 prey items were recorded to be delivered per night, on average 3.7 (range 2.3–5.1) prey per chick nightly. Up to 21% of prey deliveries were done in daylight in Wytham whereas in the Netherlands only 2% were during daytime. In one British nest, with three owlets (the oldest being 15–25 days old) each chick received about 88 g (3.1 oz) of food per night while later near fledging, each would get 124 to 141 g (4.4 to 5.0 oz) per night. In an experiment study, broods were both increased and decreased to see if males differed their food deliveries, it was found that the males did change their food delivers as a result of brood increase or decrease, with the decreased broods being fed well while the increased broods were food stressed and showed particular signs of declining condition of the brooding female as she had less food for herself. Instrinic factors were weighed about the condition of parents in a study from Finland, with the female's age being the most significant factors that could be determined. Furthermore, it was found that male condition was the most important factor for female condition, with older males often in better physical condition. Weather conditions were found to be intrinsic with condition of parents in Finland, and further that larger females could breed earlier and more successfully on average. A study of steroid hormones in a selected 51 pairs within Denmark (from a network of 204 nest boxes) were used to measure hormone levels. It was found that testosterone levels were consistently higher in 3 year old birds of both sexes, birds of this age were more productive in all aspects of breeding than younger owls, although it was not clear to what extent higher breeding success can be attributable to hormonal levels versus experience is unclear. A testing of testosterone levels in owl offspring within Danube-Ipoly National Park in Hungary determined that experienced parents produced nestlings with more testostrone mainly in correlation with mild weather. In poor weather or inexperienced parents the levels were lower. The testostrone levels in the Hungarian study were found to be lowest in poor weather conditions in the last of the owl's broods and most such young usually died during the early nesting period.

When they are alarmed or required to act in self-defense near the nest, tawny owls of all ages but especially older nestlings up to fledging age, have been recorded to raise feathers and outstretch wings, to their expand size and possible shield itself, also snapping their bills. Despite the tawny owl's reputation as a highly aggressive bird when encroached upon, the parents are usually retiring even when the area of the nest is broached. Passive measures are usually taken first in parental nest defense. The mother owls are often tight sitters, one female sat motionless even as she was physically turned over, while another sat tight but flushed eventually after several human intrusions. Sometimes parents engage in distraction display when attempting to protect their young but less frequently than do long-eared owls. There is much individual variation in aggressiveness of response to disturbance and threats, with a similar occasional but widely reported tendencies for aggressiveness in nest defense in many other Strix owls as well. In the earlier part of the nestling period, males sometimes launch defensive attacks but these tend to be relatively mild and no physical contact is often made. In western Switzerland, females were 2.9 times more likely to respond aggressively to artificial nest predator stimuli than males. Later into the nesting period, the female may begin showing more aggressive reactions to disturbance or threats. Older females were found in a study show a more aggressive defense as well as those with larger broods and earlier nestings, however non-aggressive females were found to have more future reproductive years on average than aggressive ones. Rufous morph females were more vigorous in nest defense than other morphs in a study from Switzerland. At the first detection of an intruder, the female may let out muffled hoots initially. Attacks only tend to occur somewhat regularly in developed areas, especially city parks, where repeated intrusions occur and perhaps resulting desensitization and irritation. Some individual females and rarely males become routine attackers on humans and may be known as "furies". In at least some cases parks may be closed due to unprovoked tawny owl attacks. The female tends to attack humans from behind and focus on the head and shoulders when physical contact is made, especially if the person turns their back, but even then often veer short of physical contact. Humans are inefficient at fending off sudden physical attacks because of the silent flight of the owls. Tawny owl mothers not infrequently attack threatening animals common in parks such as dogs and cats as well as martens (at times knocking them out of the trees) and red foxes, especially at dawn or early in the night. Other than scalp abrasions, occular damage can be considerable when tawny owls attack humans. Perhaps the best-known victim of the tawny owl's fierce attack was the renowned bird photographer Eric Hosking, who lost his left eye when struck by a bird he was attempting to photograph near its nest in 1937. He later called his autobiography An Eye for a Bird.

== Development of young ==
Young begin to call in about 24 hours before they hatch. Asynchronous hatching occurs but is slightly less pronounced perhaps than long-eared and barn owls, rarely ranging up to 2–3 days apart. The female broods the owlets closely until 10–15 days, rarely ceasing as early as 7 days. In a Danish study, it was found that 59% of 268 nestlings were male, as opposed to roughly even sex ratio in Great Britain or Hungary, with the ratio not changing annually unlike clutch size, brood size and reproductive success. The gender of broods were studied relatively to testosterone levels in differently sized clutches in Hungary with smaller clutches with lower testosterone levels being male-biased. In this Hungarian study, survival rates were higher in smaller broods than in larger brood. Heavier parents raised all offspring hatched to them, while lighter parents raised 33% of the offspring. 59 of 99 reduced broods were males, while 34 of 81 unmodified broods male. Although sometimes said to only fed young at night, the mother can also parse out tiny bits of food by day to their nestlings. The young are fed small bits of meat for about 12 days, at which point the young open their eyes and begin to more actively beg. Also around 12 days, the nestlings produce their first pellets, though they are often of a rather liquid consistency.< Older nestlings beg with quivering wings and intense high-pitched food begging calls. Female only regularly hunts again after brooding period (usually a little after the young are 2 weeks old). The male tends not to enter the nest to make food delivery, often the female receives it nearby on a branch of the tree or at the entrance of the nest hole, later when the nestlings are large, the male often will silently deposit the prey directly into the nest without landing. When the young are 21–25 days old, young begin to spend much time around the entrance of nest hole, and may begin to emerge 3–5 days later. It was found in warmer conditions, that the owlets born to rufous morph mothers requires less oxygen consumption and may have experienced less stress. Evidently the oldest is usually the first to leave hole. After leaving the nest and becoming "branchers", the young owls often clamor around using both the feet and the beak, and often land on the forest floor, from where they tend to flutter and climb into bushes, trying to reach higher parts of the trees (and should not be handled if found on the ground as such). Finally, at 29–37 days, with an average of 32.1 days in Kielder Forest, the young fledge, but take about another two weeks before they can fly strongly. The young post-fledgling owls continue to beg, often following and rarely leaving an area of about 50 m (160 ft) away from their mother. The pre-dispersal young used an area of 5 to 15 ha (12 to 37 acres) in England while, in Scotland, it was only 2.2 to 6.5 ha (5.4 to 16.1 acres). In Denmark, the distance between post-fledging siblings ranged from 11 to 0.6 m (36.1 to 2.0 ft) during day and 32 to 6 m (105 to 20 ft) by night, meaning that they are associative with one another at this stage, and they would spend 20–80% of nighttime hours food begging, up to 82% in poor food years. At around 1 to 3 months (sooner in Denmark, later in England on average), the young tawny owls begin to hunt for themselves. At the age of 2 to 3 months the young owls can be evicted by their parents, although often appear to disperse independently. However, on average of 72 radio-tagged juveniles in Denmark after the young owls would stop begging for food at 90–123 days of age, they would typically roost within their parents territories for another 18 days without incident. In the Danish Gribskov forest, 41 radio-tracked broods were dependent after fledging for a mean of 71 days (with a range of 56–84). 5 of 12 radiotagged juveniles survived dispersal in a different study from Denmark, independence was gained at an average 77.3 days and single day movements recorded of up to 4 km (2.5 mi). 22 radiotagged young tawny owls in England were tracked post-dispersal relative to vole concentrations, though there was no evidence that there were consistently able to access the peak vole areas. 27.4% of area selection was found to be likely correlated to vole access. The age at first breeding may be early as one year, but is more commonly 2–3 years old and rarely not until 4 years old.

== Breeding success ==
Breeding success averages fairly high in this species. A study within oak-hornbeam-birch forest in Hungary on the breeding output of males, 77 males examined from the 1st breeding year until 9 years of age, increase breeding output from 2 to 4 years of age thence peaking at 5–6 in age. However, at older than this the male breeding output begins to decline, possibly due to senescence, perhaps since males may be unable to continue withhold high-quality territories from competition. The 5 to 9-year-old males were flexible to prey variations in ways younger males were not. In Hungary's Pilis Biosphere Reserve, 1992–2000, the age of females appeared to effect the number of eggs and hatching success, while the age of the male effected the number of fledglings, with 39 pairs studied, with 98 females and 85 males produced in network of 180 nest boxes. Again older males and females (i.e. 5 to 9) were seemingly more productive overall. Hungarian data shows lower overall number of young during years with harsh, snowy winters but due to the low number of young, the successful raised young were stronger and in better condition on average once fully grown than the young owls in years with many offspring. The breeding success overall in Lithuania has steadily increased, with a survival rate reached of 72% for females. The area of Burgundy in France, productivity of successful pairs avg 3.2, varying from 2 to 3 to 4 in poor, intermediate and good prey years. In western Switzerland, over the course of 14 years, females produced an average of 5.67 fledglings. On an area of 3,800 ha (9,400 acres) in the Netherlands, 9 successful breeding attempts were recorded, a very low density to such an extent that unlike many other parts of the range that attempts to attract owls with playback were largely unsuccessful. As for breeding success near Rome in Italy, out of 326 attempts, 4–28% were successful in different years, with the number fledglings ranged from 0.4–1 overall and 1-1.18 per successful pair and habitats with more rainfall and less arid conditions being more productive. Of 311 breeding attempts studied over a 13-year period in Rome, 59.5% failed in urban plots and 51.3% in suburban areas, with 18.5% and 23.4% in urban and suburban zones producing 1 fledgling, 12% and 18% producing 2, 8% and 7.2% producing 3 and 2% in the urban area producing 4. In Roman areas, the breeding rates are generally quite low but are fairly stable annually, due to warmer average ambient temperature and less local trophic competition. The total breeding success in Roman pairs was 43.5% in the city (also 0.83 fledglings per pair and 1.86 per successful pairs) and 51% in suburbs (also 0.82 fledglings per pair, 1.63 per successful pair). Of 256 Belgian eggs, 24% did not hatch, 10% of those were deserted, 51% were addled and 39% were deserted or destroyed by the female when food supply was low. In the Belgian data, of 195 young hatched, 94% fledged and 6% died in nest as a result of starvation, with an average number of fledglings 2.06, varying from 0 to 3.25 on average in different years based on vole numbers. In southern France, brood size for all pairs was 2.2 while for successful pair it was 3.2 (range 2–4.3 per pair). In the French study, cannibalism was reportedly surprisingly often to be committed by mother or siblings. 73.7% of the studied French broods produced fledglings. Of 357 pairs in the woodlands around west Berlin in 2 decades starting 1958, 160 pairs produced 333 fledglings, with an average of 2.08 per successful nest. 13 pairs in the city parks of west Berlin produced 47 fledglings, 3.3 pairs per successful nest, productivity strongly correlated to number of yellow-necked mice available. More broadly in the Berlin metropolitan, nesting success averaged 2.1 and 2.8 per successful nest, but could vary 2.7 to 3.2 on average in low and high vole years. In eastern Bohemia, an average 2.6 young fledged per successful pair, but no determinable difference in productivity was noted during good and poor prey years. Breeding success varied in Finland based on vole numbers, from 2.4 to 2.7 in poor years to 3.4–3.5 in good years, but only a slight variation was recorded in clutch size and young hatched. Finland has shown a sharp increase overall in tawny owls in the recent three decades was from 422 to 1710 active territories found, from 198 to 1566 nests found and from 168 to 1341 successful nests found. When vole populations were high, the number of young tawny owls introduced into the population of Finland was ten times higher than in low years. It was found in Denmark that a control group of 32 out of 131 radio-tagged young that were supplementally fed by researchers were more vulnerable to predation (36% of these died, mostly due to mammals like foxes around fledging age) but also earlier nests were vulnerable as well (more so to other birds of prey).

Of 562 eggs laid in Great Britain, 314 young hatched, with 44% lost before hatching and 2% lost before fledging. Cambridgeshire produced an average of 0.3 for all territories in fragmented woods and 0.89 for all territories in continuous woods. This study of the English countryside showed that the owl population varied relatively little in proportion to the sharply cyclic nature of the main prey here, field voles and wood mice, due to the owl's ability to exploit alternate prey in poor rodent years. In Scotland, perhaps with less diverse prey available in the more northern clime, the trends of tawny owls were more sharp: 2.6 fledglings were produced in good vole years, 1.65 average in declining years and 0.2 in poor vole years over a 7-year period. Scottish data showed nestling mortality was higher in poor vole years, at about 31% vs 14% in good vole years, with no sex bias. During low prey years in Wytham, anywhere from 33 to 77% of eggs produced are abandoned and may freeze, but little to no change occurs in territory occupancy. Authors inferred that the parent owls in Kielder Forest are able to biological predict the vole numbers based on spring feeding access and produce more often the more productive sex, which were females here. Territorial changes in Kielder were associated to habitat and land use changes with 25% more territories recorded from 1981 to 1991 then a 21% reduction from 1992 to 1998. In this area, due probably to the exotic conifer dominated forest, owls were quite dependent on field vole numbers in the openings, and could vary from twentyfold from low to high years, with 70% of the variance of productivity could be correlated to the habitat types available and show the importance of habitat heterogeneity. In peak years at Kielder, of 197 attempts, 6.9% failed to breed and 28.3% successfully bred, in the increase years, of 44 attempts, 10.2% failed to breed and nesting successful was 76.2% and in the decrease years, of 62 attempts, 12.5% failed to breed and nesting success average was 69%.

== Longevity and natural mortality ==
Tawny owls can live to more than a decade. The oldest recorded in the wild in central Europe was 18 years and 7 months old while the oldest in Sweden recorded was nearly 14 years old. These records were subsequently broken by a female recorded in the wild in Switzerland at an age of 21 years and 11 months. The species has been recorded to live to 27 years or so in captivity. If voles are scarce and weather harsh during winter, many tawny owls die by various means (starvation being primary). Starvation rates are high in newly independent young if there is no unoccupied territories in the vicinity (at least by 1 bird of their corresponding gender). Mortality averaged about 15% in territorial adults in Wytham. In Finland, Ural owl displaced tawny owls but great grey owl peaceably allow them in the vicinity. Although moderately hardy during sub-freezing winters, severe winters can be dangerous in areas such as the Russian part of their range. Mortality in general in the northern limits of the range is probably higher than Ural owl. This species is increasingly affected by avian malaria, the incidence of which has tripled in the last 70 years, in parallel with increasing global temperatures. An increase of one degree Celsius produces a two- to three-fold increase in the rate of malaria. In 2010, the incidence in British tawny owls was 60%, compared to 2–3% in 1996. Direct anthropogenic causes of mortality are covered later. Of 22 radio-tagged young tawny owls in Kielder, 36.4% (8) owls died 10–106 days after fledgling but while still on parent's ranges, another 22.7% (5) died after leaving parents territory at 40–147 days after fledgling, 22.7% (5) also disappeared after fledged but while still dependent and were quite likely preyed upon while the only 4 remaining lost radio contact after leaving parent's range at 58–178 days after fledging. Of 13 certain to have died, 6 were due to starvation, 3 were due to predation by goshawks, one by an infected eye injury, while the rest of uncertain cause. Mortality rates can be even higher elsewhere such as an average of about 92% in Scotland and about 61% in Norway for juveniles before they disperse. Meanwhile, recorded average mortality rates in the 1st year of radio-tagged tawny owl lives were recorded as the following averages: Sweden at 71.7%, Switzerland at 49.4%, England at 52.6%, west Germany at 48% and Belgium at 58%. Radiotagging studies showed average mortality for Swedish 2nd year owls was 44.3%, 24.5% at this point for Swiss owls and 22.2% for English ones while in the third year the Swedish one's mortality was estimated to average 47.6% and English ones at 31.8%. The survival rate average over two decades was unexpectedly somewhat high in Finland in about 20,000 owls, where it was 33% in the 1st year, 64% in 2nd year, 73% in subsequent years. In England, it was estimated that there was 6–11 times lower survival rate for tawny owls that were radiotagged than for those that were not based on estimates, the theory as to why it lower survival is that the additional weight burden of the radio-tags themselves may have inhibited capture of food and also made juveniles more vulnerable to goshawks.
