= Hárshegy =

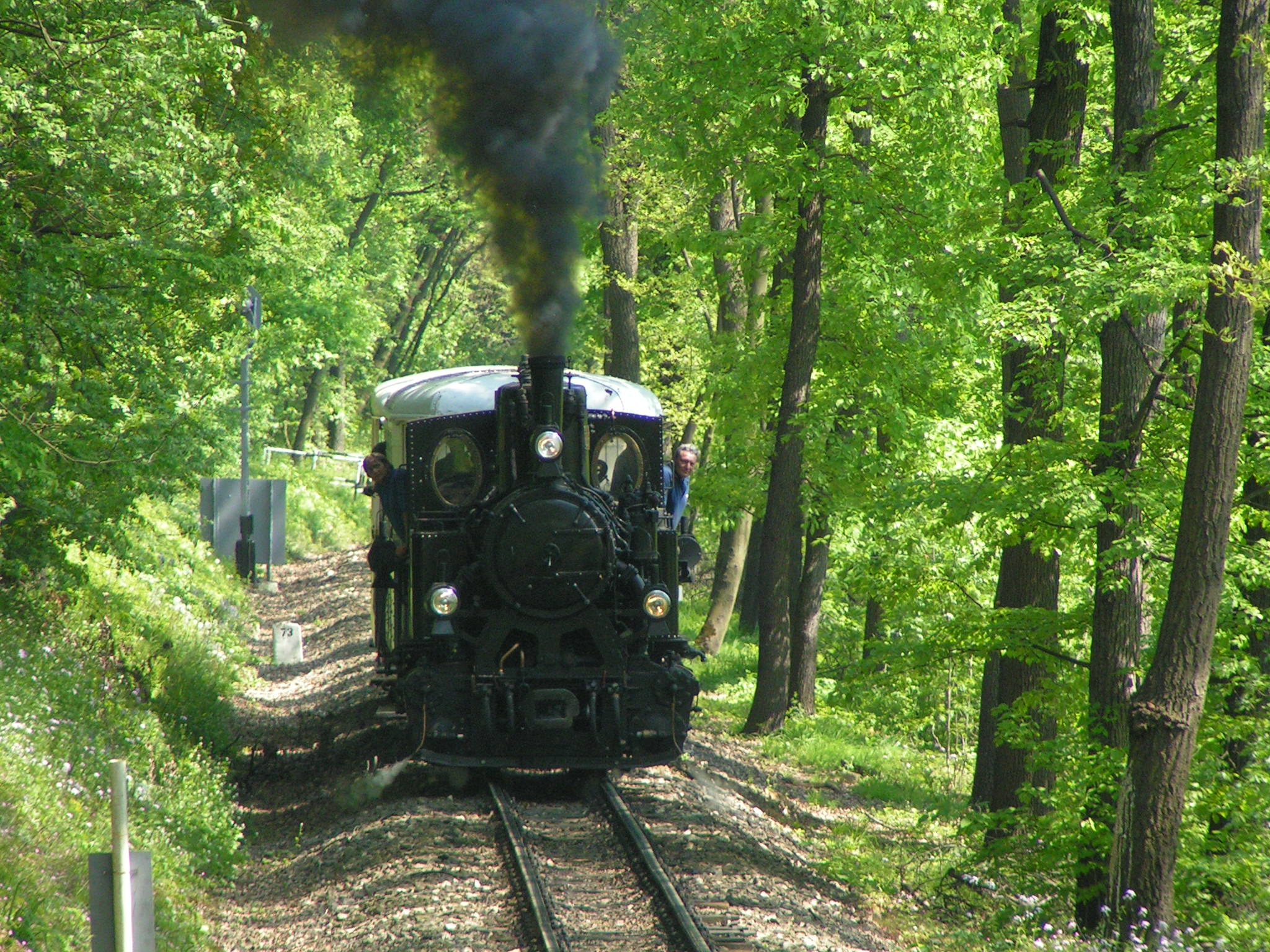
- Historic train on the Nagy-Hárs-hegyi section of the children's railway near Hárs-hegy railway station
- Etymology: Linden Hill
- Coordinates: 47.5336°N 18.9552°E
- Country: Hungary
- City: Budapest

Population
  - Total: 654 (2,001)

Hárshegy (English:Linden Hill, German: Lindenberg) is a part of Budapest's 2nd district. Its entire area is made up of Nagy-Hárs Hill (Great Linden Hill) and Kis-Hárs Hill (Little Linden Hill), from which there are sweeping views of Budapest. The area is a popular place for recreation, and the Hárs-hegy railway station of the Children's Railway is located in there.

The name of the area "Linden Hill" alludes to the geologic history of the area. The Hárshegy Sandstone Formation is named after the region.

== Background ==
During the Middle Ages, Bathory Cave, on the southeastern slope of Nagy-Hárs-hegy, was mined for iron ore.

In the saddle between Hárshegy and János Hill is Szépjuhászné (Beautiful shepherdess), the site of the monastery where the Pauline Order founded their first priory. Bathory Cave was the hermitage of Pauline monk László Báthory, who left the monastic life at the nearby priory to live in the cave for 20 years.

In 1847, Gábor Döbrentei proposed a new name for the Germanic "Lindenberg" given to the area. He proposed Bátorhegy, however, the mirror translation Hárshegy, took hold instead.

The area is a popular place for recreation, including camping and hiking. Visitors frequent the Károly Kaán Lookout Tower at the top of Nagy-Hárs-hegy named after Károly Kaán, who oversaw the reforestation of the Great Hungarian Plain after the Treaty of Trianon. The Imre Makovecz observation tower on Kis-Hárs Hill offers commanding views of the Buda Hills, Castle Hill, and the Citadella.

== Scouting ==
The 1928 Scouting World Conference was held in Budapest, with a May 6 rally at the Hárshegy Training Park attended by 9,647 Scouts. The Chief Scout, Lord Robert Baden-Powell of Gilwell visited in Budapest, from May 5–8, 1928. On May 7, he visited at the Hárshegy Training Park, and left his footprint on the sand. The Hungarian scouts made the B-P's Footprint statue in the Harshegy Training Park.

The Hárshegy Training Park was located on Ferenc hill, and the street address of the HQ was Hárshegy út 7. From 1927 and 1948 it was the central leader training park (the Hungarian Gilwell Park) of the Hungarian Scout Association. In 1948, the communist regime destroyed the scout park, and banned the scout movement. The Council Rock is still there.

== Gallery ==
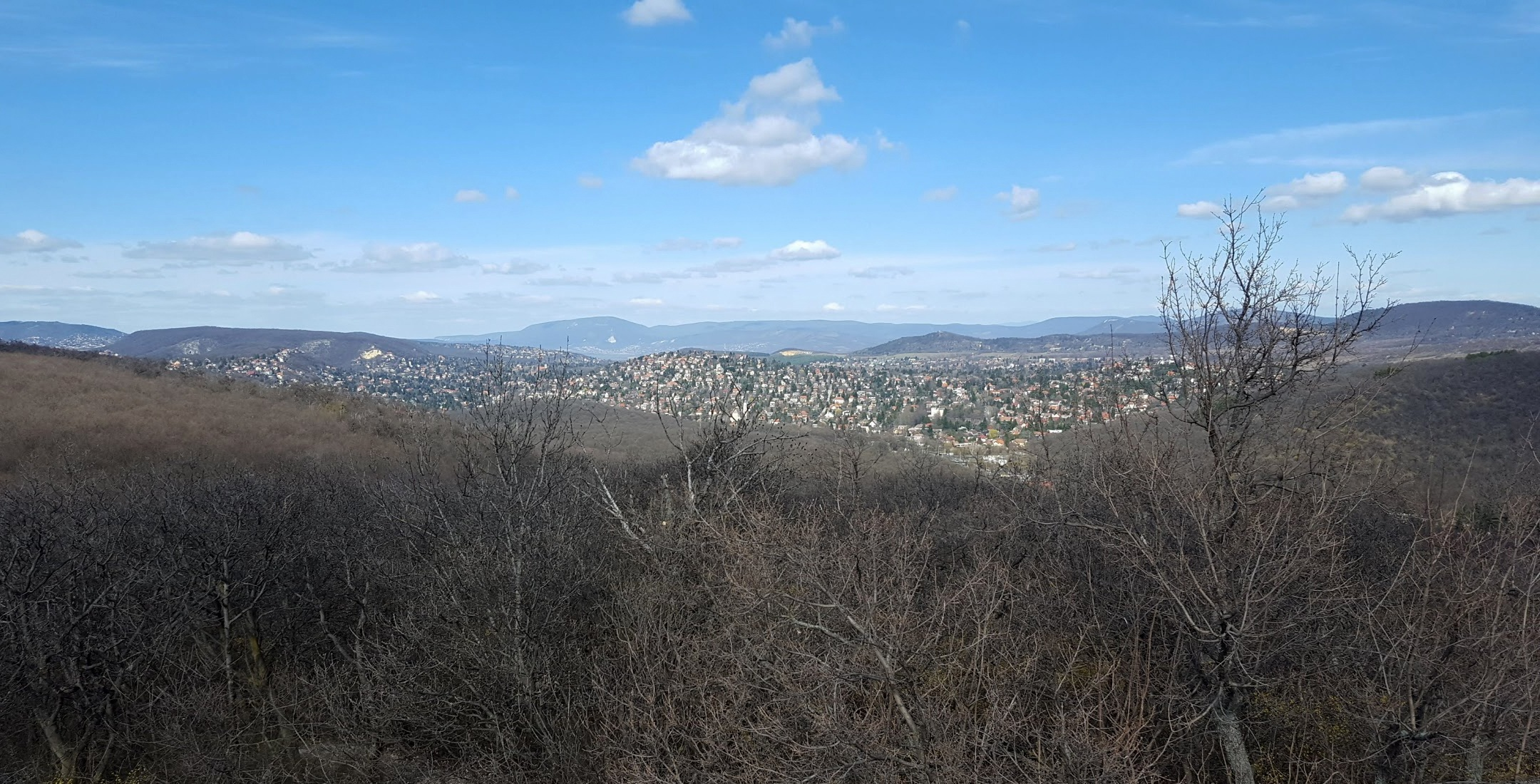
View from Hárshegy of Budapest

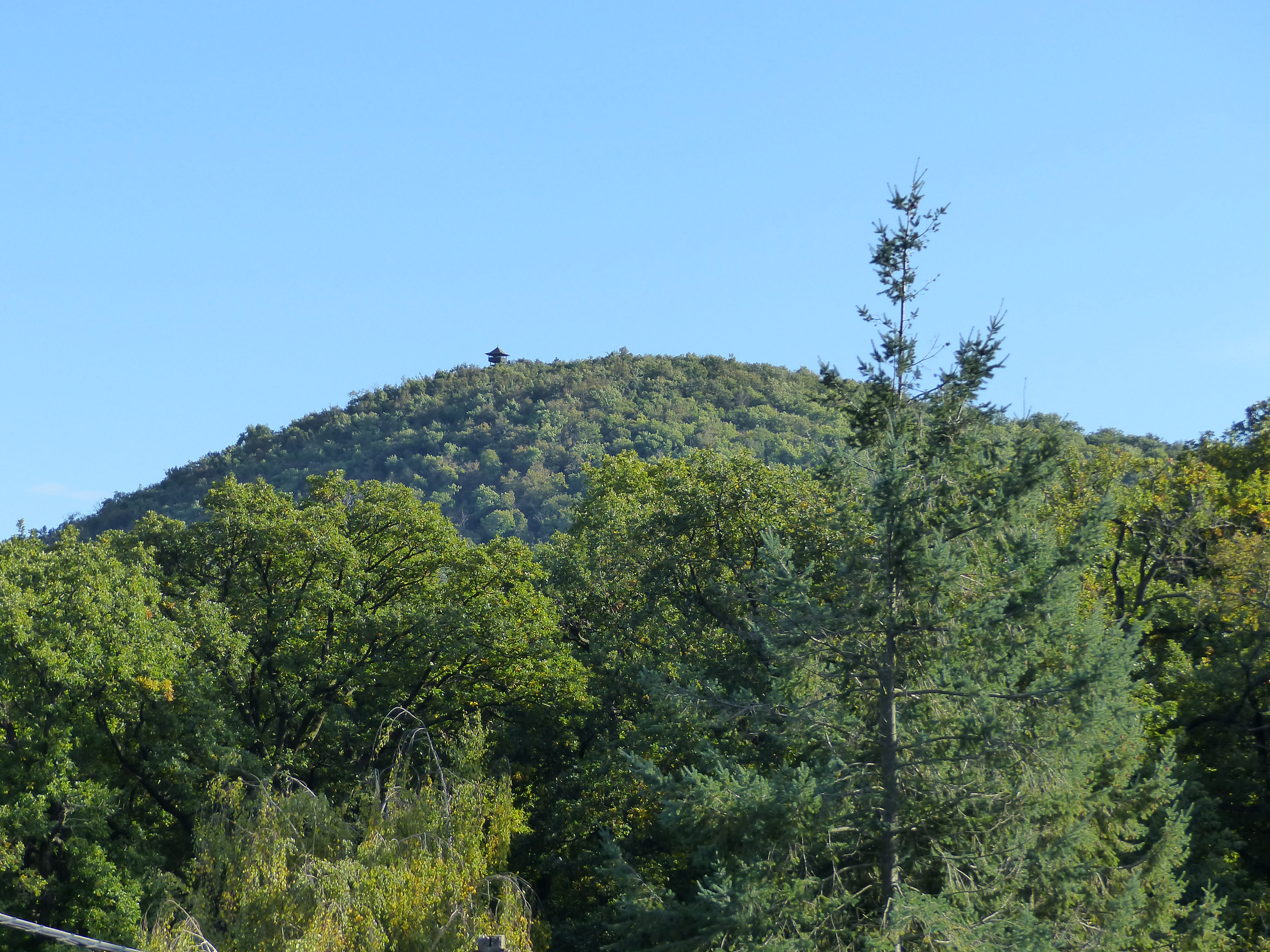
View of Hárs Hill

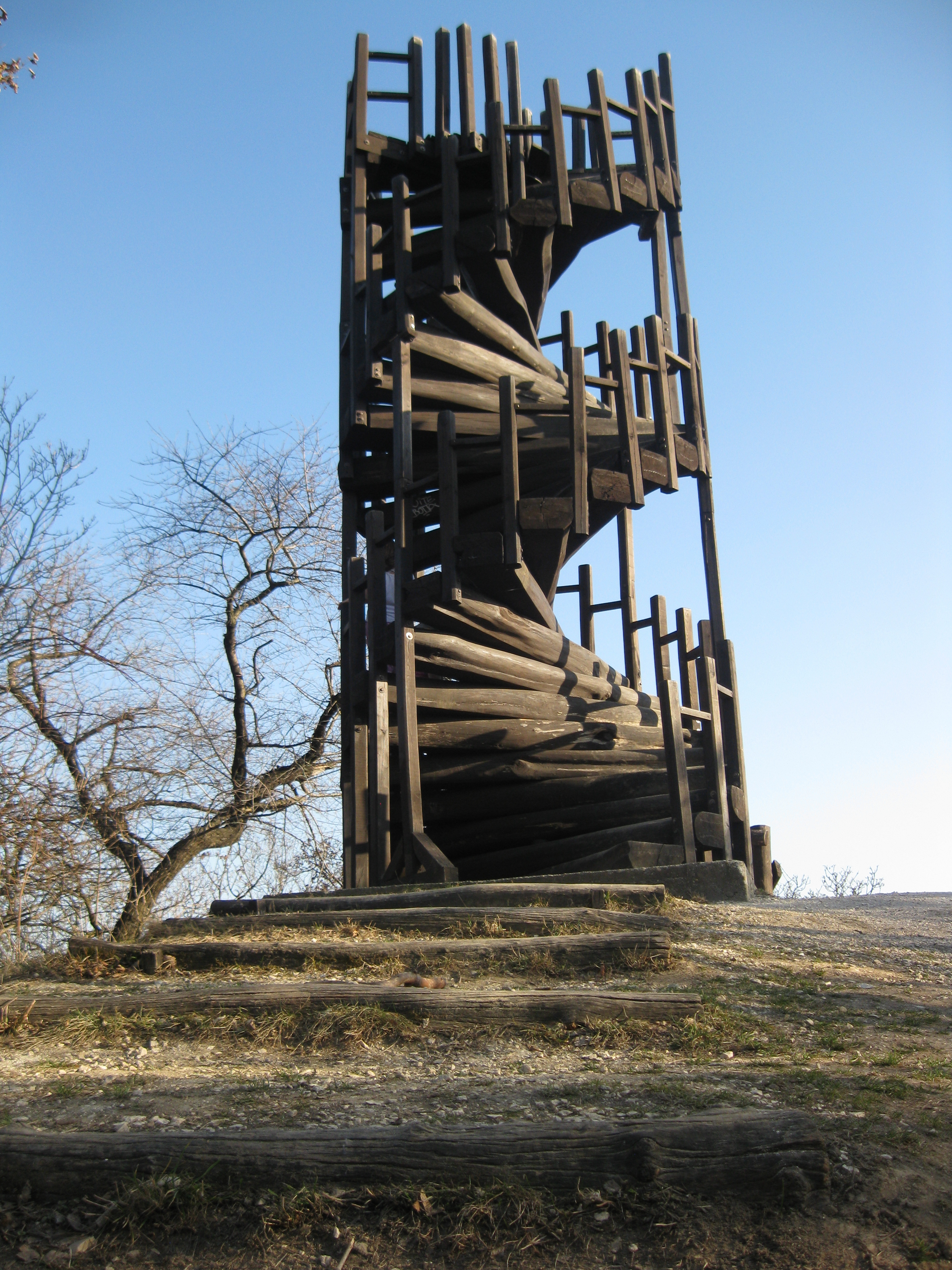
Observation tower on Kis-Hárs Hill

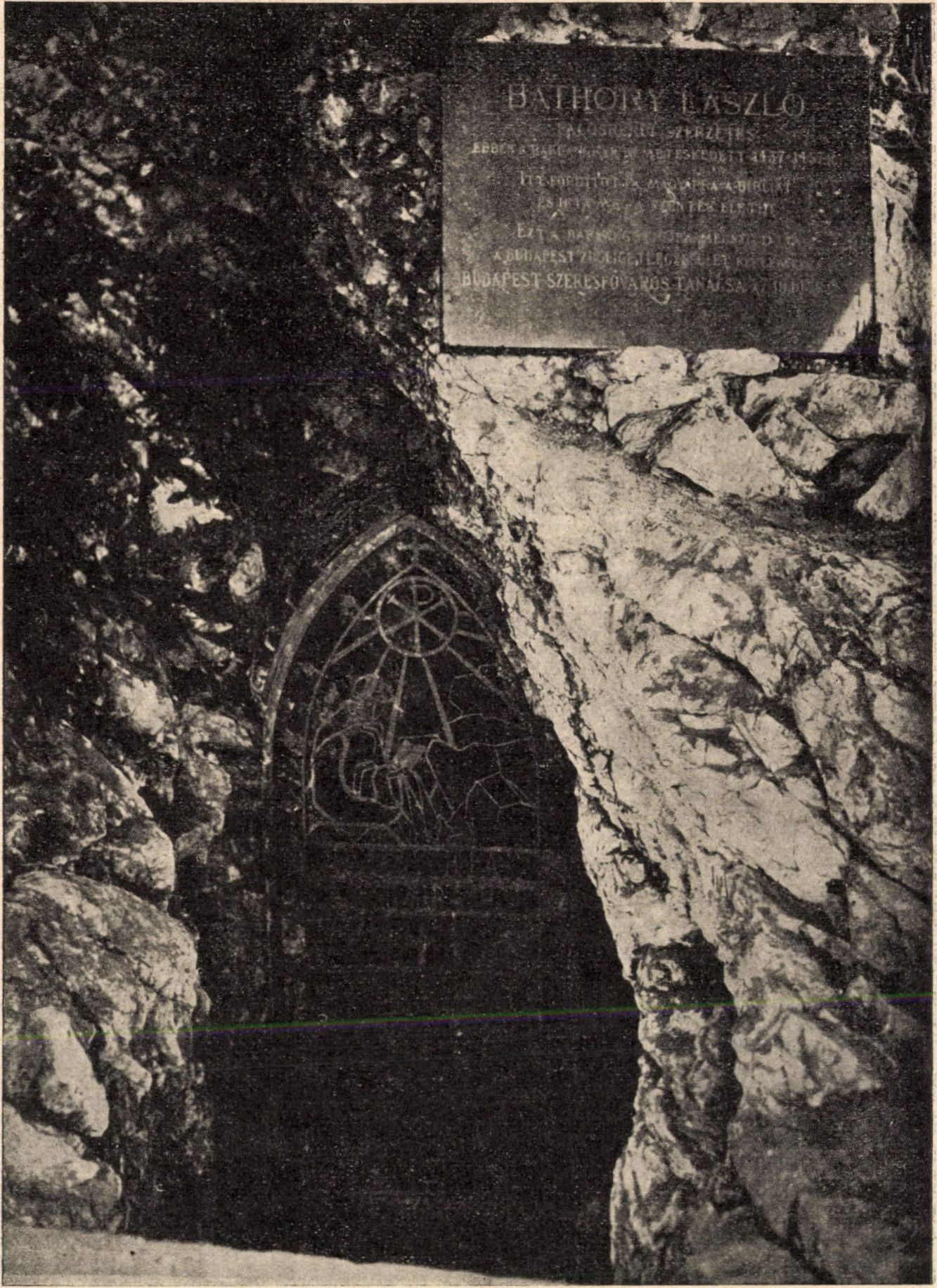
Bátori Cave

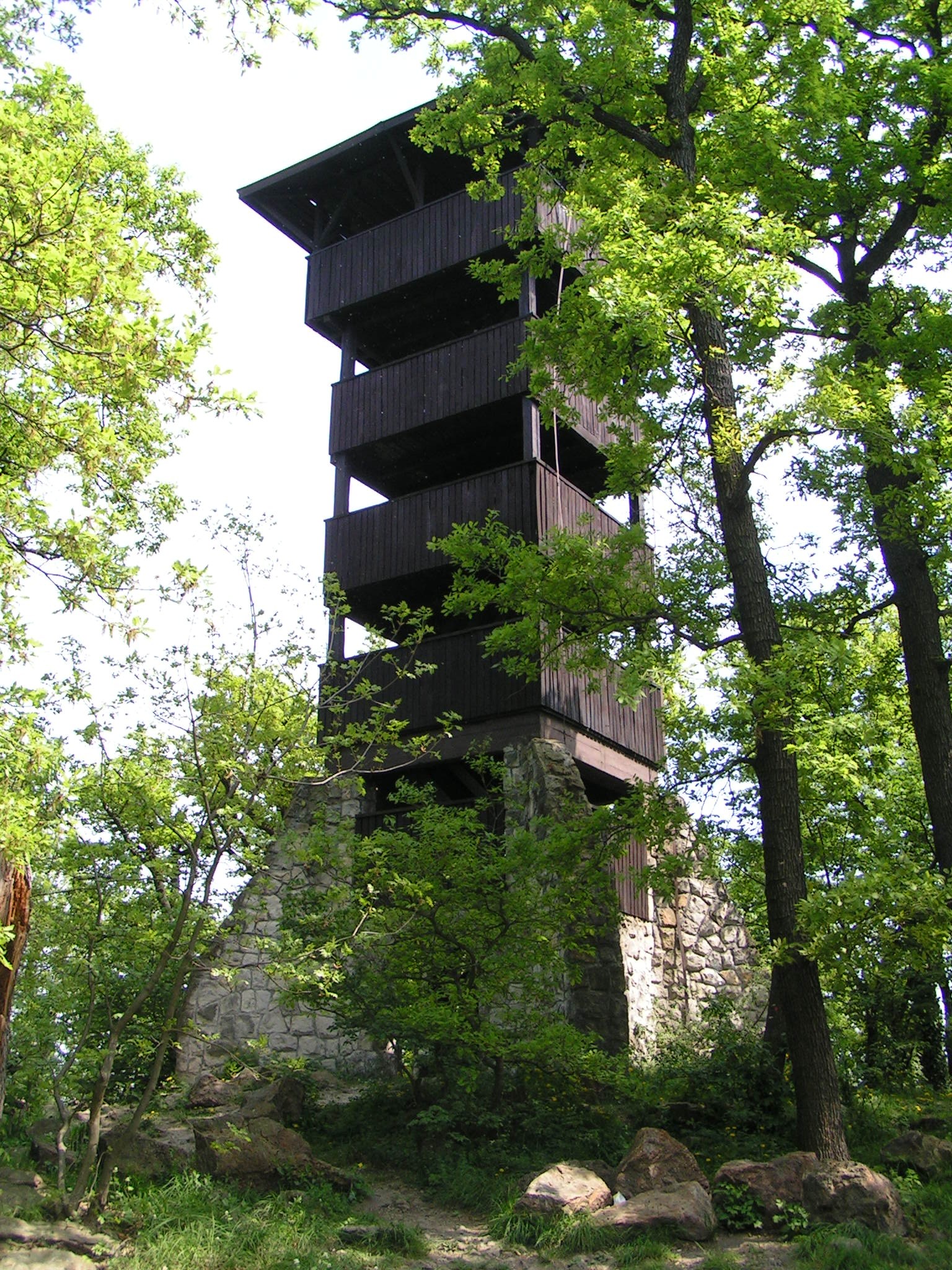
Károly Kaán observation tower

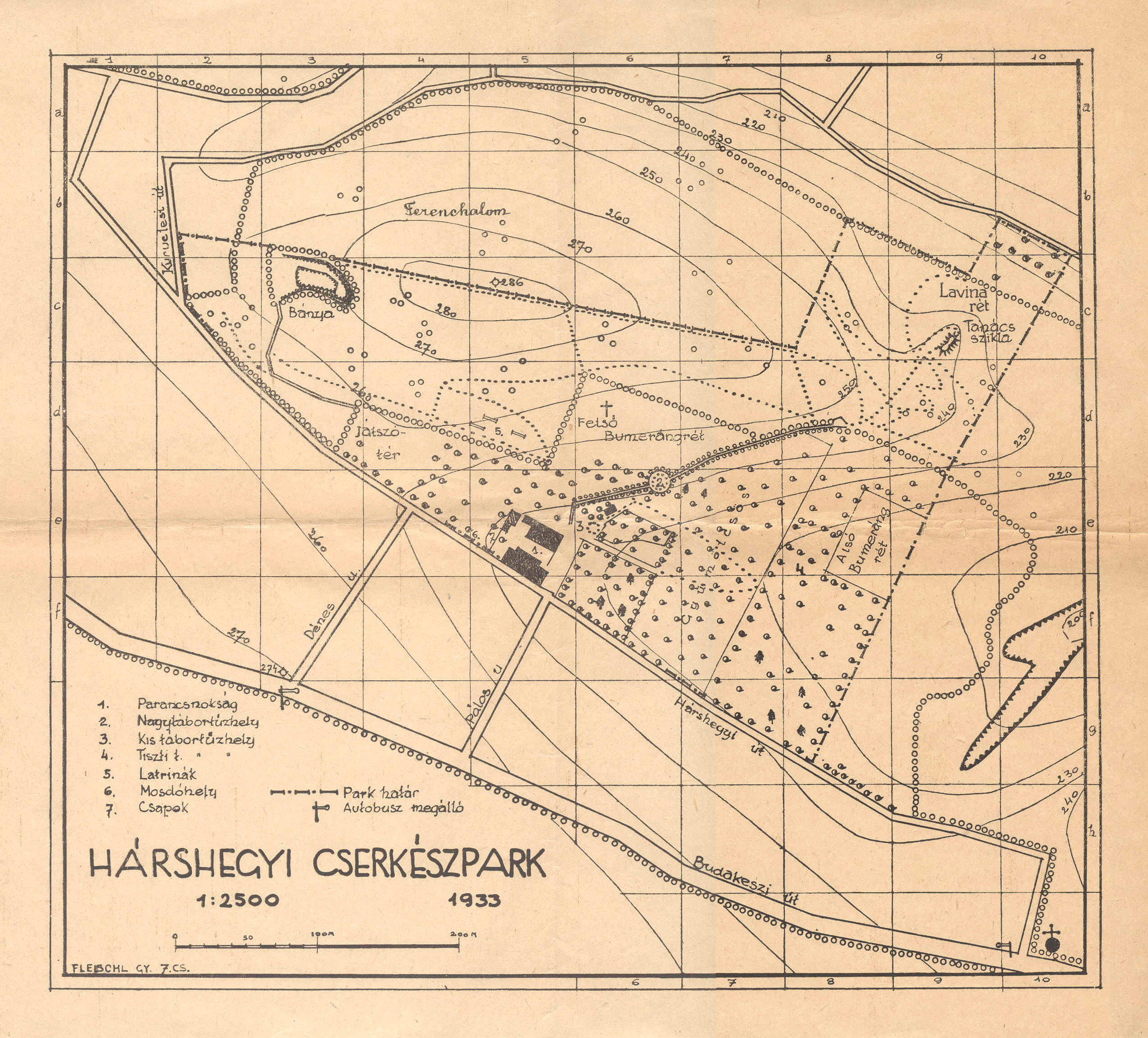
Map of Hárshegy Training Park (The Hungarian Gilwell Park 1927–1948)
