= Order of Saint Paul the First Hermit =

Roman Catholic monastic order

- Ordo Fratrum Sancti Pauli Primi Eremitæ
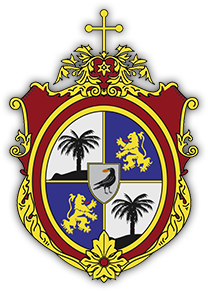
- Coat of arms
- Abbreviation: OSPPE
- Formation: 1250; 776 years ago
- Founder: Eusebius of Esztergom
- Founded at: Hungary
- Type: Monastic Order of Pontifical Right (for Men)
- Headquarters: Rome, Italy
- Members: 482 (347 Priests) (2018)
- Prior General: Arnold O. Chrapkowski
- Website: paulini.pl/pl/news

The Order of Saint Paul the First Hermit (Latin: Ordo Fratrum Sancti Pauli Primi Eremitæ; abbreviated OSPPE), commonly called the Pauline Fathers, is a monastic order of the Catholic Church founded in Hungary during the 13th century.

This name is derived from the hermit Saint Paul of Thebes (died c. 345), canonized in 491 by Pope Gelasius I. After his death, the Monastery of Saint Paul the Anchorite was founded and still exists today, taking him as its model.

== History ==
The Order was formed in 1250 by the Blessed Eusebius of Esztergom (Hungarian: Boldog Özséb) of two communities: one founded at Patach around 1225 by Bishop Bartholomew of Pécs, who had united the scattered hermits of his diocese, and the other consisting of his own followers. In 1246, Blessed Eusebius, Canon of the Cathedral of Esztergom, resigned his dignities, distributed his goods among the poor and withdrew to the solitude of the Pilis mountains, near Zante (probably related to present day Pilisszántó) to lead a life of penance with a few companions (see the ruins of the Holy Cross Monastery at present-day Kesztölc-Klastrompuszta). Four years later, he is said to have been admonished in a vision to gather into community the other hermits living in the vicinity, for whom he built a monastery and church the ruins of which are near the village of Pilisszentlélek (today a part of Esztergom).

In the same year, Eusebius proposed and obtained affiliation with the Patach community under the rule prescribed by its founder and was chosen superior. He received the approbation of Ladislaus, Bishop of Pécs, for the new Order, but the publication of the decrees of the Fourth Lateran Council at this time necessitated a journey to Rome to secure final authorization by the Holy See.

In 1263, a new Rule was given the congregation by the Bishop of Pécs, which was superseded by still another drawn up by Andrew, Bishop of Eger, after the death of Eusebius (20 January 1270), and this was followed until 1308 when the permission of the Holy See was obtained to adopt the Rule of St. Augustine. The Order was accorded many privileges by succeeding pontiffs, among others that of exemption from episcopal jurisdiction, and provisions were made for the pursuit of higher studies in many of the monasteries, one papal regulation ordaining that no member could be raised to any dignity in the Order without the degree of Doctor of Divinity, for which a rigid examination was prescribed.

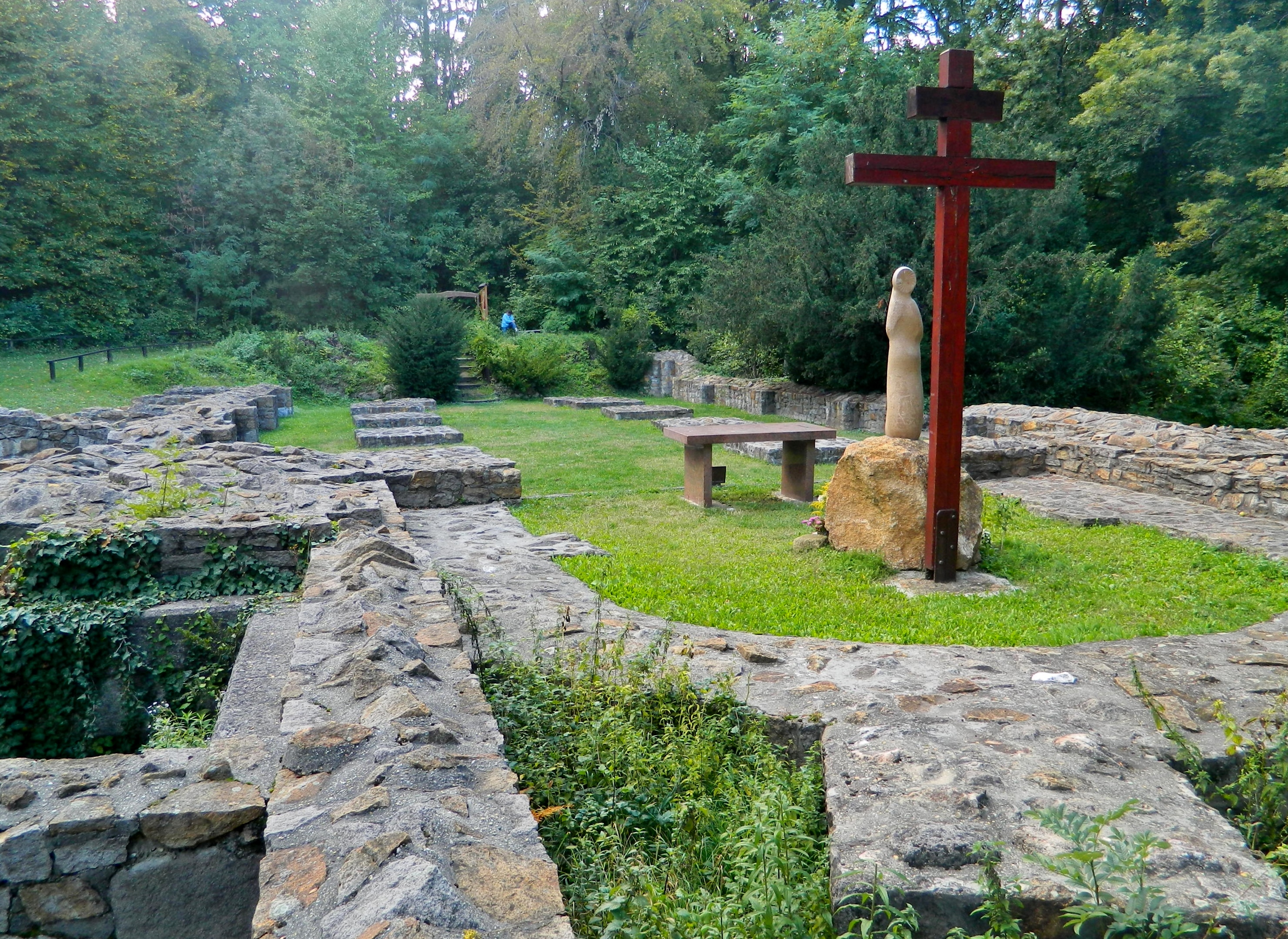
Remains of first friary, at Budapest

In the saddle between Hárshegy and János Hill is Szépjuhászné, 'Beautiful shepherdess', the site of the first Pauline monastery, known as the Monastery of St Lawrence at Buda (Hungarian: Budaszentlőrinci pálos kolostor), where the Pauline Order founded their first friary. László Báthory translated the Bible into Hungarian circa 1456, but no contemporary copies have survived. However, the 16th century Jordánszky Codex is most likely a copy of Báthory's work in the 15th century.

The Pauline Order spread rapidly through Hungary, where alone it soon numbered 170 houses, and it attained an equal degree of prosperity in other countries, being divided into five flourishing provinces: Hungary (including Croatia, especially Istria), Germany, Poland, Sweden. In 1381, the body of St. Paul, the patron saint of the order, was transferred from Venice to the Monastery of St. Lawrence at Buda, which thereby gained greatly in prestige. Among the other famous houses of the congregation are the historical Polish Monastery of Our Lady of Jasna Góra (Our Lady of Bright Mountain) in Częstochowa, Poland, with its Miraculous Icon of the Black Madonna of Częstochowa (according to legend the work of St. Luke and discovered by St. Helena with the True Cross), and the monasteries at Pozsony (now Bratislava) and Wiener Neustadt near Vienna. The church of San Stefano Rotondo at Rome was attached to the Hungarian College by Gregory XIII.

In 1783, a number of houses in Bohemia, Austria proper, Styria, etc., were suppressed, and political disturbances in Hungary brought the same fate to most of the Hungarian monasteries which had rendered incalculable services to religion and education. The destruction of the annals of these houses left the historical sources very meager. There remained a handful of houses of the order in Poland. At the beginning of the 20th century, only two Pauline monasteries remained. One of them was the Church of Saint Michael the Archangel and Saint Stanislaus of Szczepanów — Bishop and Martyr connected to a monastery Na Skałce (On the Rock) in Kraków, Poland, founded by Jan Długosz, and regarded as a national sanctuary. The other was recalled earlier: the Monastery of Our Lady of Jasna Góra.

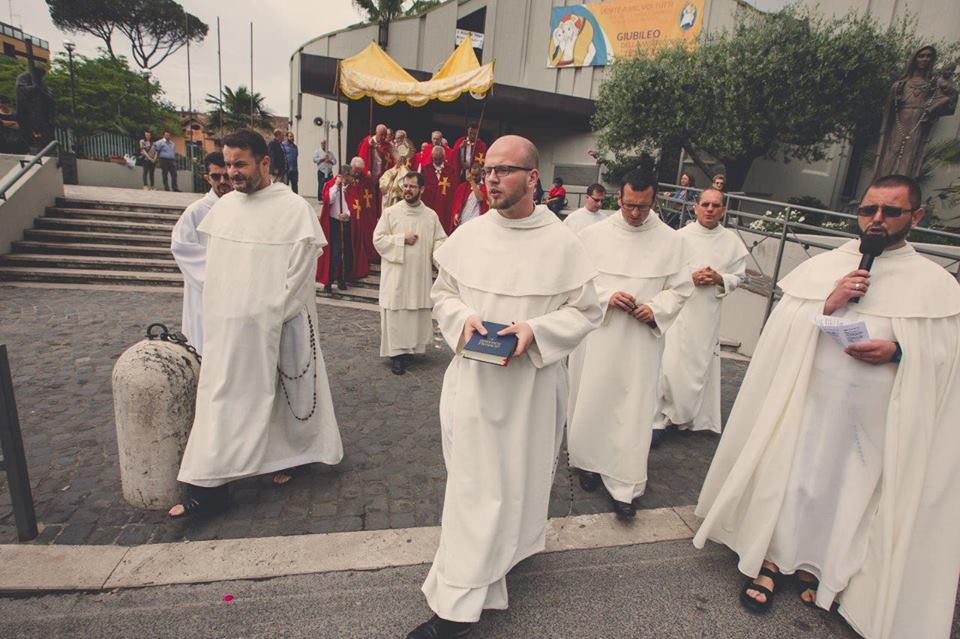
Pauline monks in procession for the Feast of Corpus Christi at Parrocchia Santi Urbano e Lorenzo in Prima Porta, Rome

Among the members of the order to attain prominence were George Martinuzzi, bishop of Nagyvárad (Oradea) and cardinal (murdered 16 December 1551), an important figure in the history of Hungary; Matthias Fuhrmann of Hernals (died 1773), historian of Austria and editor of the Acts of St. Paul of Thebes; Fortunatus Dürich (1802) and Franz Faustin Prochaska (died 1809), editors of a Czech translation of the Scriptures.

The habit was originally brown but, in about 1341, white was adopted with a white belt or cincture and, over the white tunic, a white scapular with a hood. In choir or more commonly in liturgical events, a white mantle is worn by monks in perpetual profession. The Order is also known for its privilege of wearing a white zucchetto, although many monks choose not to wear them. Monks also may make use of a black cloak either to protect their habit from the elements or to keep warm in winter. Like all religious who wear white habits, white socks ought to be worn with the habit of the order.

== Blessed Eusebius of Esztergom ==
- Et tu Hungaria, mi dulcis patria, cum Paulinis crescis et, cum itidem, decrescis.
- És te Magyarország, édes hazám, a pálosokkal együtt növekedsz és velük hanyatlasz.
- And you Hungary, my sweet fatherland, who with the Paulines grows and, with whom, likewise fades.

— Péter Pázmány

Eusebius was born in Esztergom in the Kingdom of Hungary around 1200. He came from a wealthy, well to do family. He received his ordination in the cathedral in Esztergom as a Canon Regular of Saint Augustine. In 1216, he received permission from the bishop to leave the cathedral and he began a hermitage in Pilis. In 1246, more of his brother canons and other hermits along the river Danube lived with him near Pilisszántó.

Around 1250, he founded the first real Pauline community at the monastery of the Holy Cross where they adopted the hermits rule from the monastery of St. James in Patach (founded in 1225 by Bishop Bartholomew of Pécs). In 1256, he was elected the first Provincial of the Order. In 1262, he asked Pope Urban IV for approval of the religious community and they were given temporary approval. On 13 December 1308, Cardinal Gentile Portino da Montefiore, as a legate of Pope Clement V, traveled from Rome to Hungary to grant the approval and, on this day, he also bestowed the rule of Saint Augustine on behalf of the Holy See. A year later, the first monastic constitutions were approved.

Eusebius died on 20 January 1270, in the Monastery of the Holy Cross. He was interred in the Monastery crypt. During the 150 years of Turkish occupation in Hungary, the Church and Monastery of the Holy Cross, including his tomb, was destroyed.

On 16 November 2004, the Congregation for Divine Worship and the Discipline of the Sacraments, in approving the new liturgical calendar of the Pauline Order, authorized the inclusion of the 20 January as the feast of Bl. Eusebius of Esztergom. It is noteworthy to mention that due to the close relation between the Hungarian people and the Order of Saint Paul the First Hermit, Blessed Eusebius was always referred to by the people as Blessed, from soon after his death to this very day.

== Coat of arms ==
The Pauline coat of arms contains within it the symbols listed by St. Jerome, according to pious tradition, which are associated with the last moments of St. Paul of Thebes' life.

Elements of Coat of Arms	The references to the traditions of the life of St. Paul, Hermit
The date palm	St. Paul the First Hermit produced clothing from the leaves of the palm tree.
The date palm	The fruit of the palm tree helped sustain the hermit in the desert.
The raven with a loaf of bread in its beak	This bird, through the grace of God, brought half a loaf of bread to the Hermit every day for 90 years.
Lions	Two lions dug a grave for St. Paul, where he was buried by St. Anthony the Great.

== The Order today ==
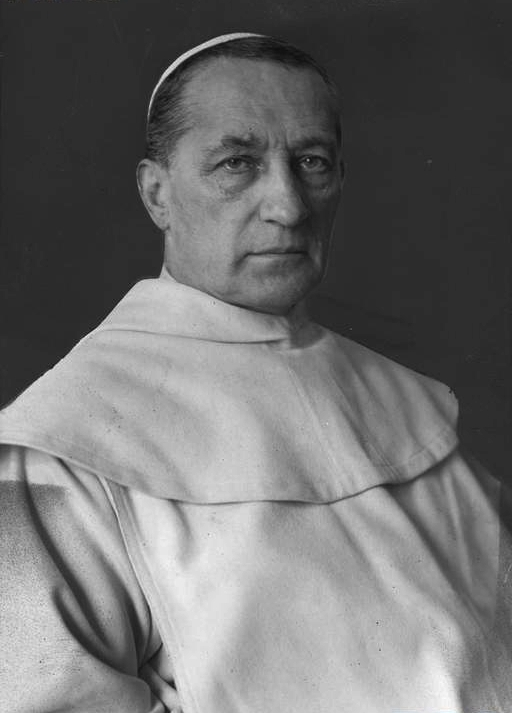
Father Pius Przeździecki, OSPPE — Superior General of the Order (1931–1942).

=== Charism of the order today ===
The essence of the Pauline Fathers are:

- Contemplation of God in solitude
- The love of liturgical prayer
- A poor and industrious life
- To spread devotion to Our Lady and the imitation of her virtues, by running shrines in her honor
- Apostolic activity, especially preaching the Word of God and the administration of the sacraments.

=== Pauline formation ===
To become a religious, it is necessary to undergo an initial period of testing as a religious brother; hence, the novitiate. This time is used to isolate a candidate for the seminary or religious life from personal and telephone contact with family and existing friends. The novice can write letters that are subjected to censorship. During the novitiate, the novices meet with their family only twice: for the clothing in the habit and on making first profession. During the novitiate, every Friday is a day during which novices are not allowed to speak with each other. The day ends with a joint ceremony, the Via Crucis (Way of the Cross). During their stay in the novitiate, brothers work in the monastery farm; they work in the field at digging potatoes and with the breeding and maintenance of the pigs. They also do work in the monastery flower-vegetable garden. The entire period spent in the novitiate is to knead the novice, to show their convictions and stability to make the decision to become a monk. It is also the period during which the older monks will need to assess the novice's suitability for life in a group such as the Order.

The Order generally accepts any men who have completed high school onwards. Those who are called to Holy Orders will undergo the following type of formation:

- The Postulancy: (if possible) in a Parish or Monastery belonging to the order.
- The Pre-Novitiate: at the Monastery of Skałka in Kraków which will last on average from 15 July to 31 August followed by
- The Novitiate: in Żarki-Leśniow, lasting a year (commencing and finishing on 8 September) that consists of the receiving and investiture of the habit and the profession of first religious vows.
- The Seminary: returning to Skałka after the novitiate, the seminarian will undergo two years of philosophy and four years of study of theology in Kraków. After the studies are completed, the seminarians profess solemn vows and are ordained first to the diaconate and then to the priesthood.

Men with no secondary education or who feel the call to the religious life but not to the priesthood and who wish to live in community can be religious brothers for life. To do this, they must go through the following stages of training:

- Postulancy at Jasna Góra, which lasts six months.
- A two-year novitiate in Żarki-Leśniów, where they will receive their habit in the first year and pronounce first religious vows the second year.
- Two years juniorate close to Jasna Góra or in Jasna Góra.
- Two years juniorate at a facility designated by superiors, followed by perpetual vows.

It is noteworthy to mention that this is the general scheme for all wishing to enter the Order of Saint Paul the First Hermit in Poland where the majority of the Order is today. Other countries offering formation are Hungary and Cameroon. Some candidates are sent to Rome to either complete or commence their studies; this being said, Poland is where most of the formation is carried out.

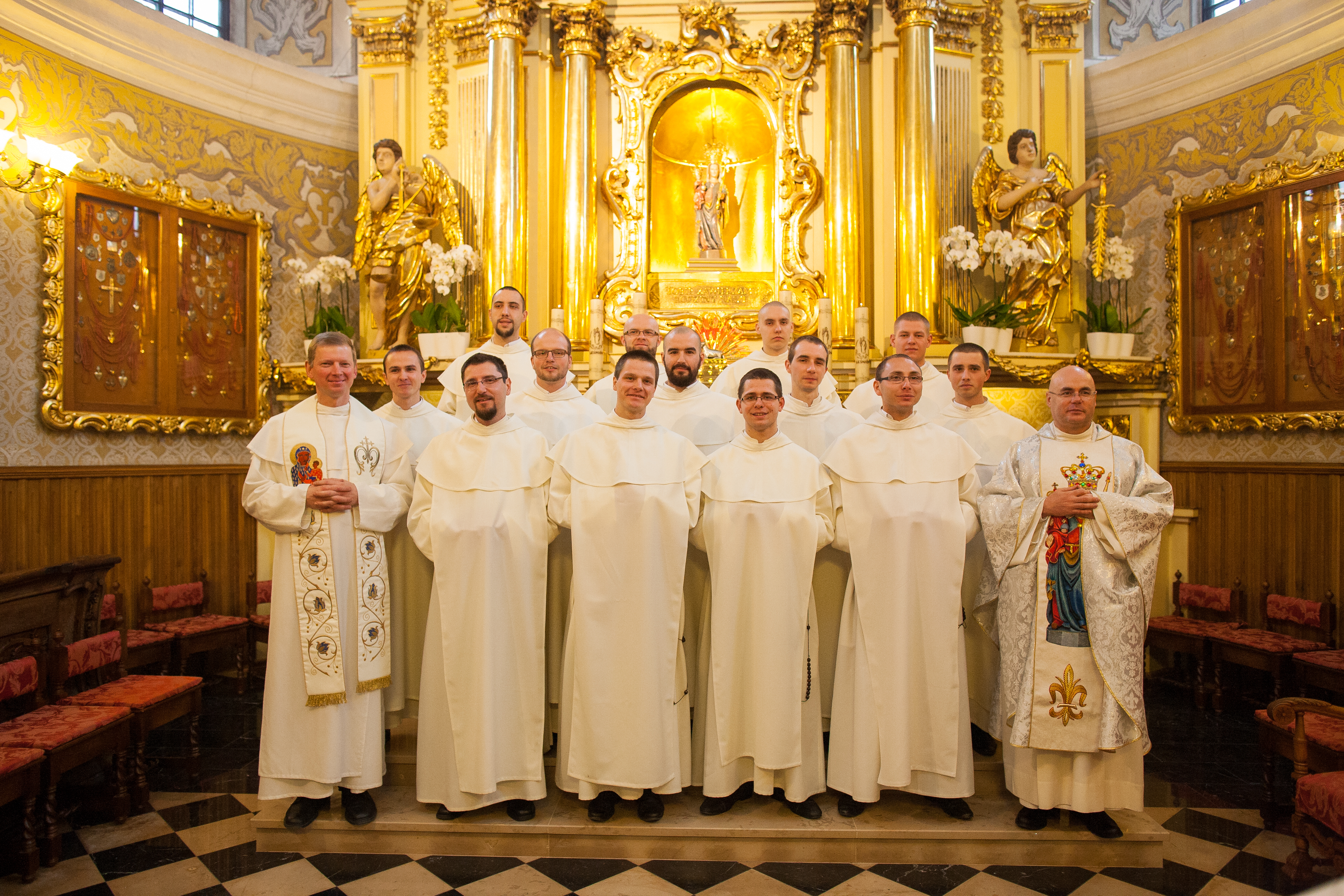
The Pauline novices of the novitiate of 2014–2015, with the Novice Master and his Socius, after being clothed in the habit of the Order.

The Australian province of the Order has a different vocational program. Normally a potential member is in regular communication with the Order and visits the monasteries of the Order frequently. At this informal stage, the potential member is called a candidate to the Order. After some discernment and maturation of the vocation, the candidate petitions to be admitted to the Order.

- The Postulancy: At Penrose Park monastery. This may last until the postulant is ready to be sent to Poland for Novitiate. Postulants seeking to be lay brothers may remain in Australia for their novitiate as well.
- The Pre-Novitiate: at the Monastery of Skałka in Kraków which will last on average from 15 July to 31 August followed by
- The Novitiate: in Żarki-Leśniów, lasting a year (commencing and finishing on 8 September) which consists of the receiving and investiture in the habit and the profession of first religious vows. At the investiture of the habit, the novice may petition to receive a new religious name, which he himself may propose. The novice is strongly encouraged to learn some Polish during the novitiate.
- The Seminary formation: All Australian seminarians are sent to Rome, where they live at the Monastery and Parish at Prima Porta (Santi Urbano e Lorenzo a Prima Porta). During this time they study two years of philosophy and three years of theology at the Angelicum. These studies may be done in English or in Italian which they are strongly encouraged to learn.
- Pastoral experience: Every second summer the seminarian returns to Australia, both to spend time with his family and to undertake pastoral experience in the various monasteries and houses of the Australian Province. After he has finished his studies in Rome and obtained a Bachelor of Sacred Theology degree (STB), the seminarian returns to Australia and professes solemn vows. After solemn profession he is ordained a deacon and then finally a priest.

=== General administration of the Order ===
==== The rule ====
The Order has its own constitution and directory. They adhere to the Rule of St. Augustine. which was given to them in the year 1308. The Order is classified as a monastic order but is organised like a mendicant one. Paulines are monks not friars. Through the passage of time the Order has had to take on more and more pastoral work, even the running of parishes, but it is still a monastic order at heart.

==== Definitorium ====
During the Chapter General Elections held on 4–5 March 2020, the following Fathers were elected to positions within the Order:

- Father General of the Order — Arnold Chrapkowski, OSPPE
- Vicar General of the Order (I Definitor) — Michał Lukoszek, OSPPE
- II Definitor — Ryszard Dec, OSPPE
- III Definitor — Piotr Łoza, OSPPE
- IV Definitor — Bernard Kluczkowski, OSPPE
- General Procurator of the Order to the Holy See — Bazyli Degórski, OSPPE
- Administrator General of the Order — Marek Moga, OSPPE
- Secretary General of the Order — Paweł Przygodzki, OSPPE

The term of office in the Definitorium lasts six years.

=== Distribution of the Order ===
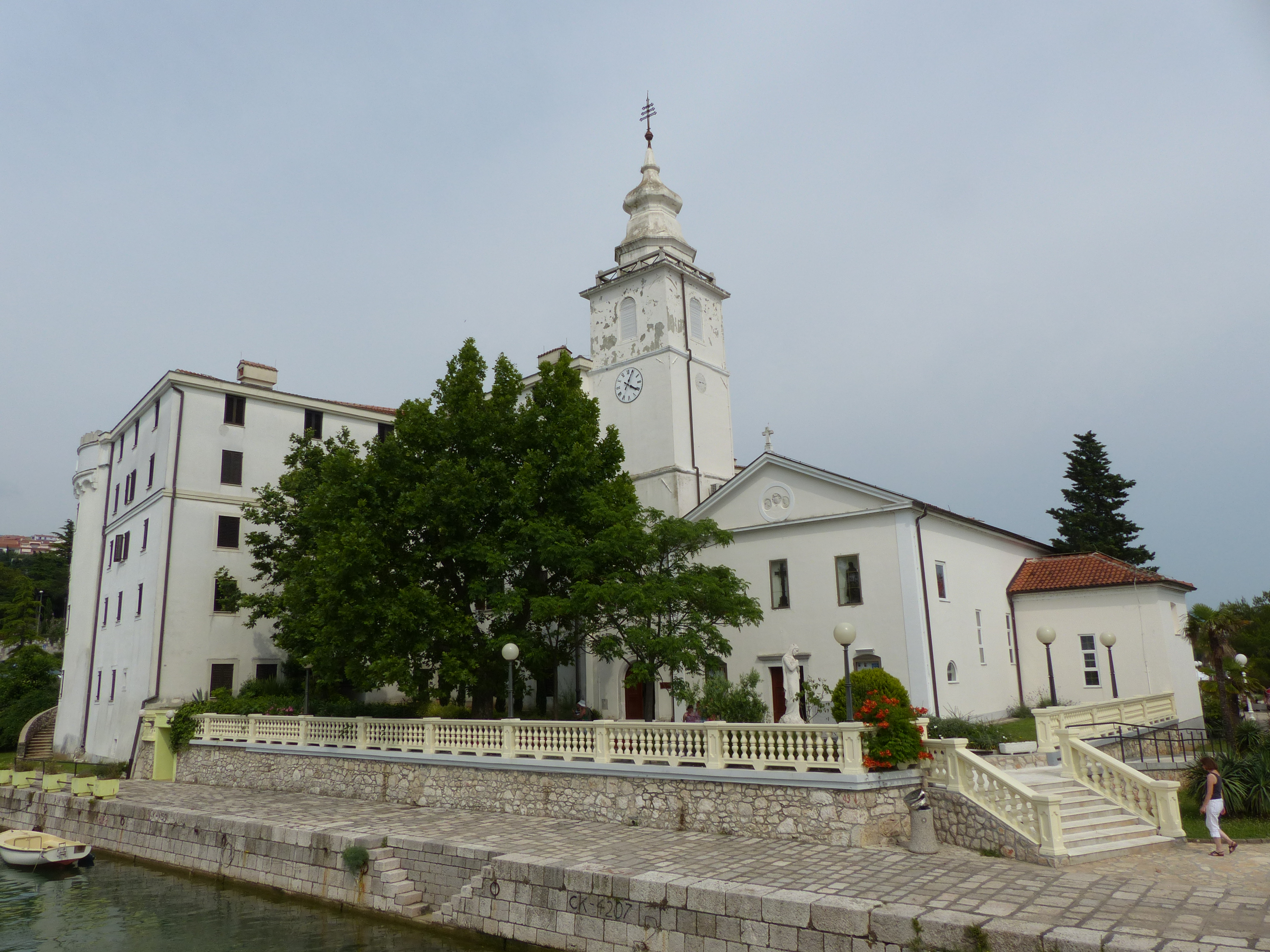
Crikvenica, Croatia

As of 8 December 2020, the Order of Saint Paul the First Hermit had 71 Homes/Monasteries/Parishes in 16 countries. There were 493 monks including 50 at various levels of formation and 3 bishops.

The Province of Germany was founded in 2002. As of 2020, the Provincial there is Benjamin Bąkowski. The American Province was founded in 2008. As of April 2022, it is led by provincial Tadeusz Lizinczyk.

The Province of Australia was founded in 2008. The current provincial is Albert Wasniowski. The province consists of two monasteries and four parishes with 1 bishop, 11 priests, three lay brothers, and four seminarians.

There are also the Quasi-Province of Hungary and the Quasi-Province of Croatia.
