= János-hegy =

János Hill János-hegy
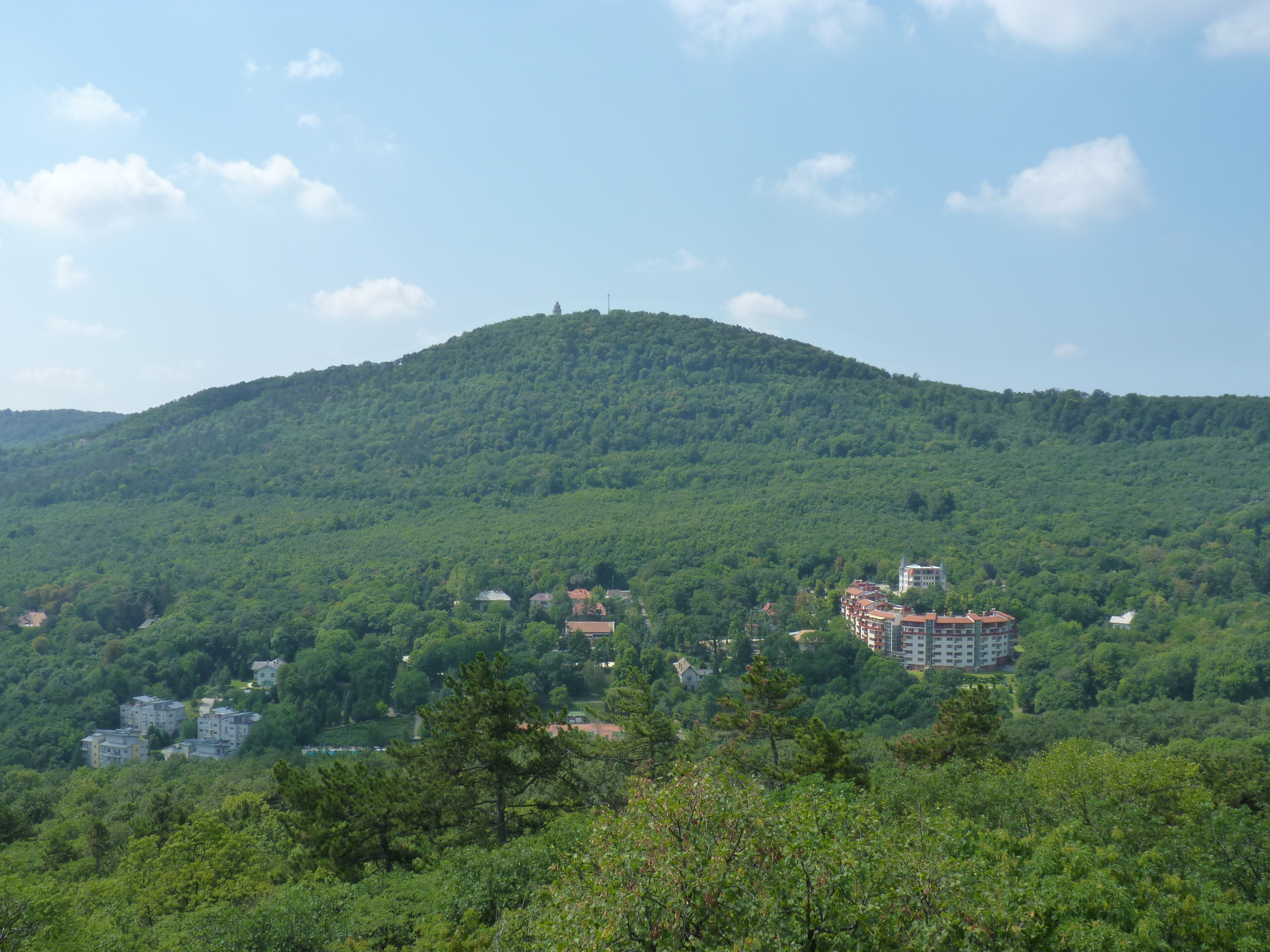
- View of János Hill from Kis-Hárs Hill
- Etymology: John's Hill
- Coordinates: 47.518333°N 18.959167°E
- Country: Hungary
- City: Budapest

János Hill (Hungarian: János-hegy, pronounced [ˈjaːnoʃ ˈhɛɟ]) (also John's Hill) is the highest point of Budapest with a height of 528 m (1,732 ft), located in the western part of the city. From Elizabeth Lookout on the top of the hill one can get an impressive panoramic view of the whole region.

== Background ==
János-hegy belongs to Buda Hills and it is connected to the popular tourist sight Normafa. Between the two hills spread the long and narrow Normafa Plateau (Normafa fennsík). The top of the hill can also be accessed by the Libegő, a chairlift which connects it with Zugliget. The hill is made up of Dachstein Formation.

In the János-hegy area you will find the Budakeszi Game Preserve

In the saddle between Hárshegy and János-hegy is Szépjuhászné the site of the Pauline Monastery where the Pauline Order founded their first friary.

== Gallery ==
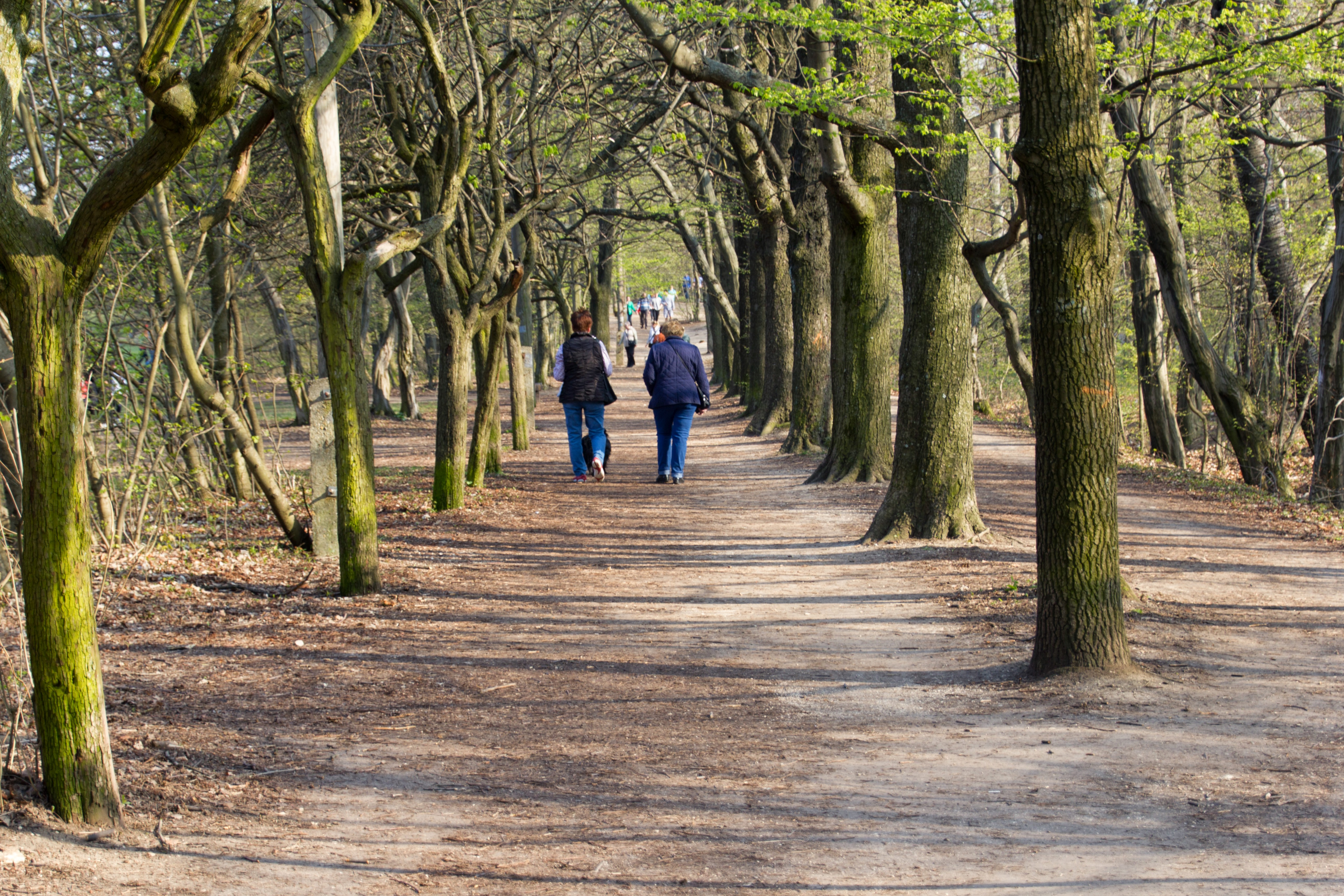
Nature on the hill

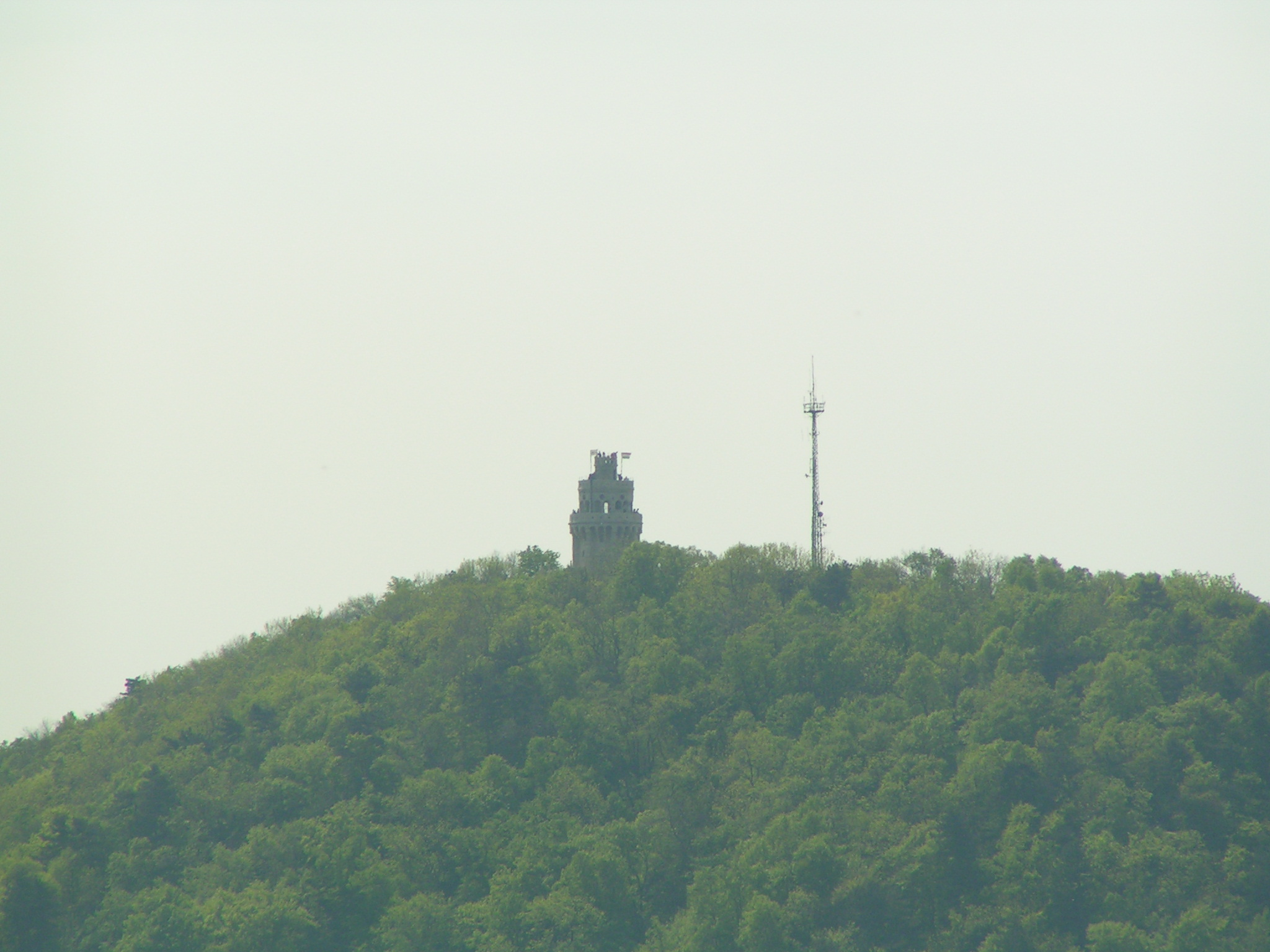
Elizabeth Lookout, Budapest

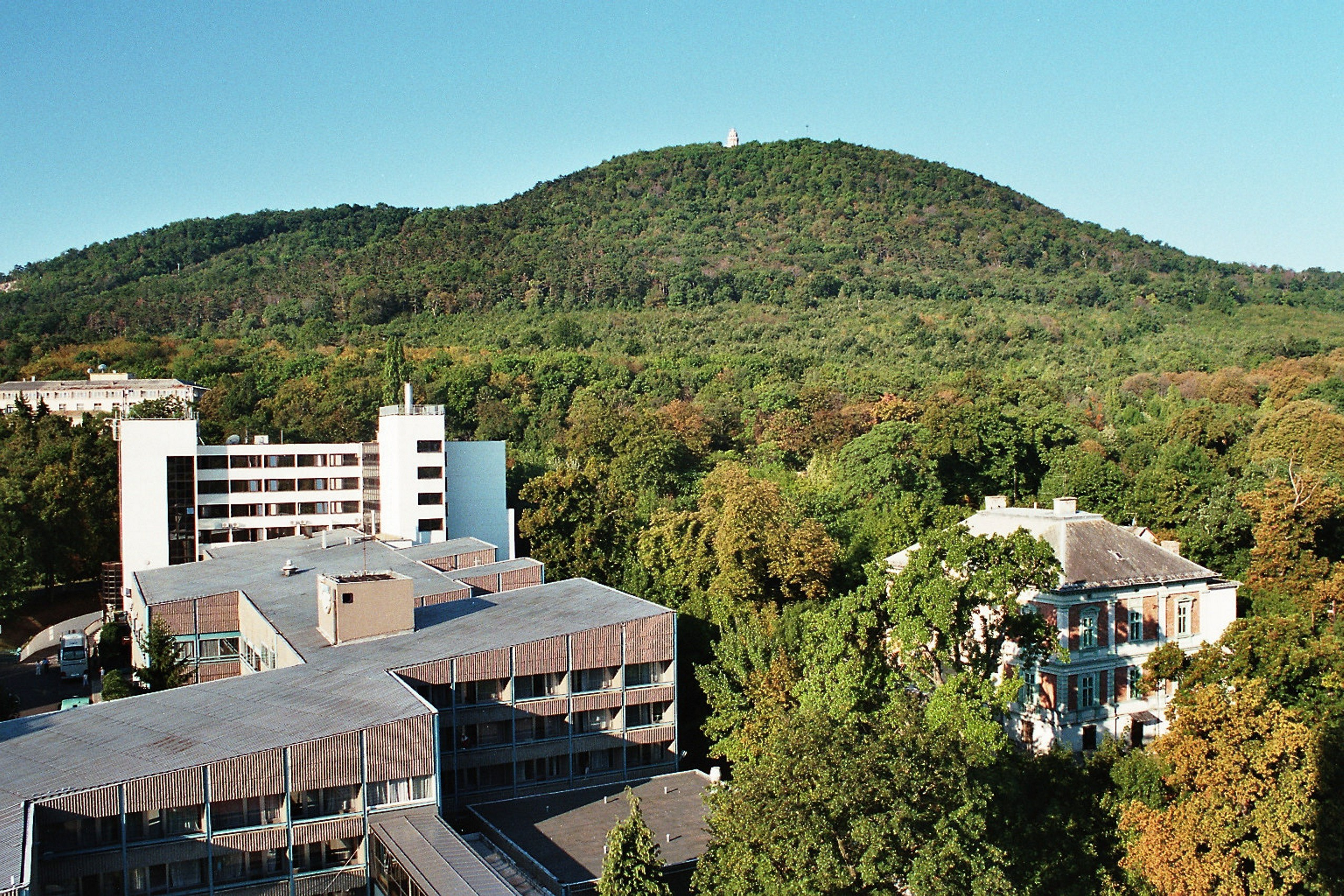
View from the Europa Congress Center to the János-hegy

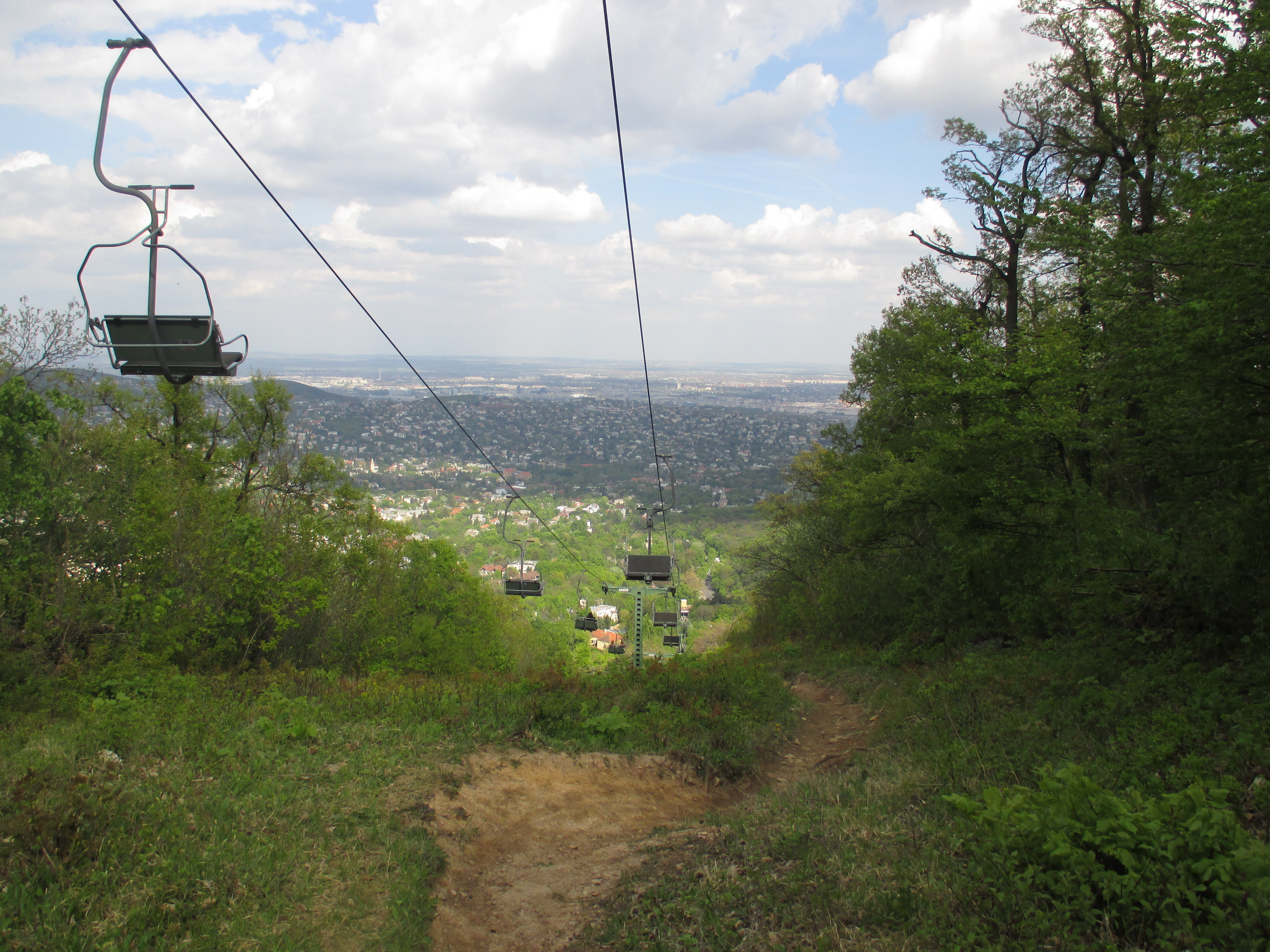
The popular Libegő

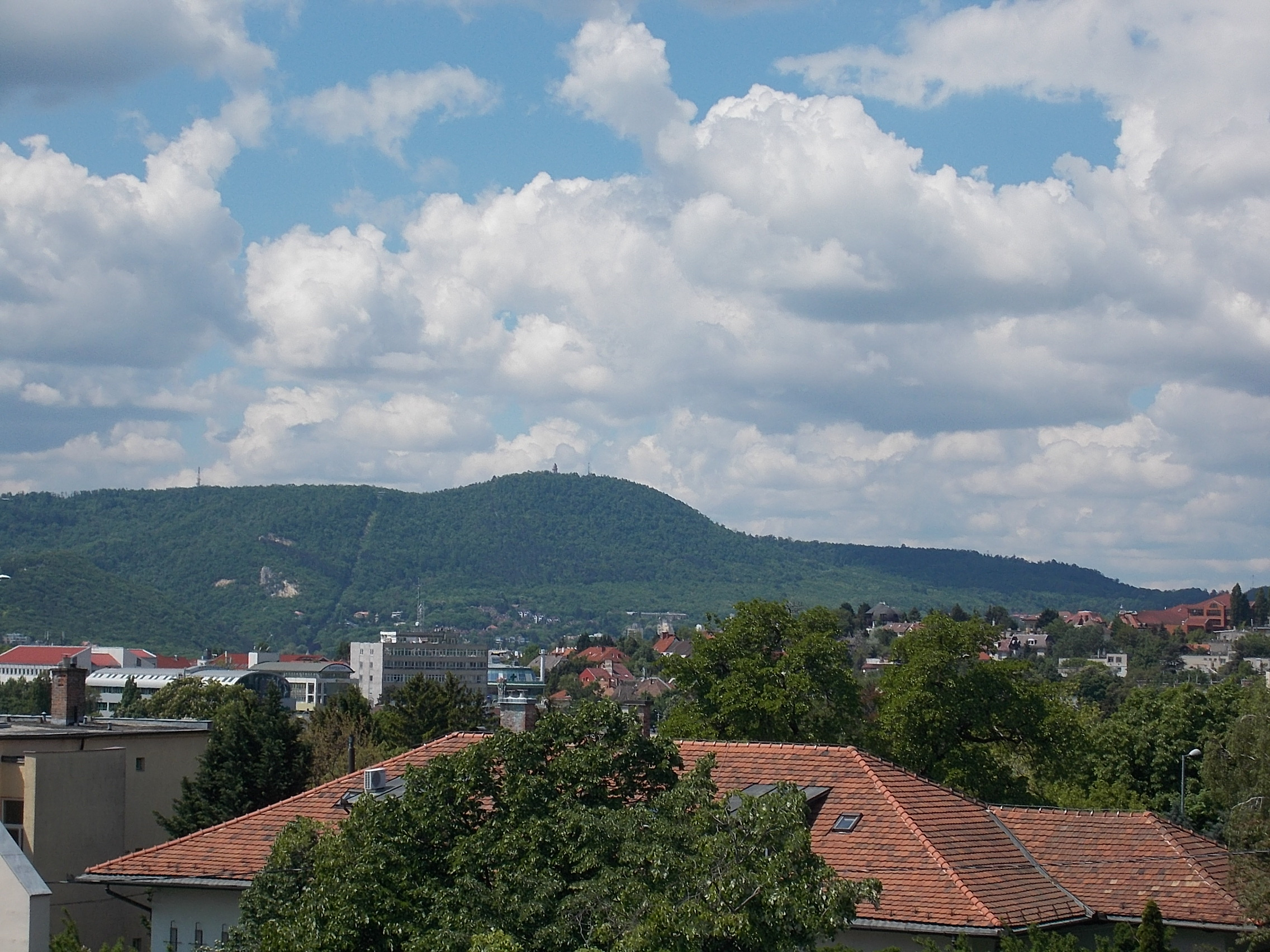
View from József-hegy lookout tower
