= Hűvösvölgy =

- Neighbourhood
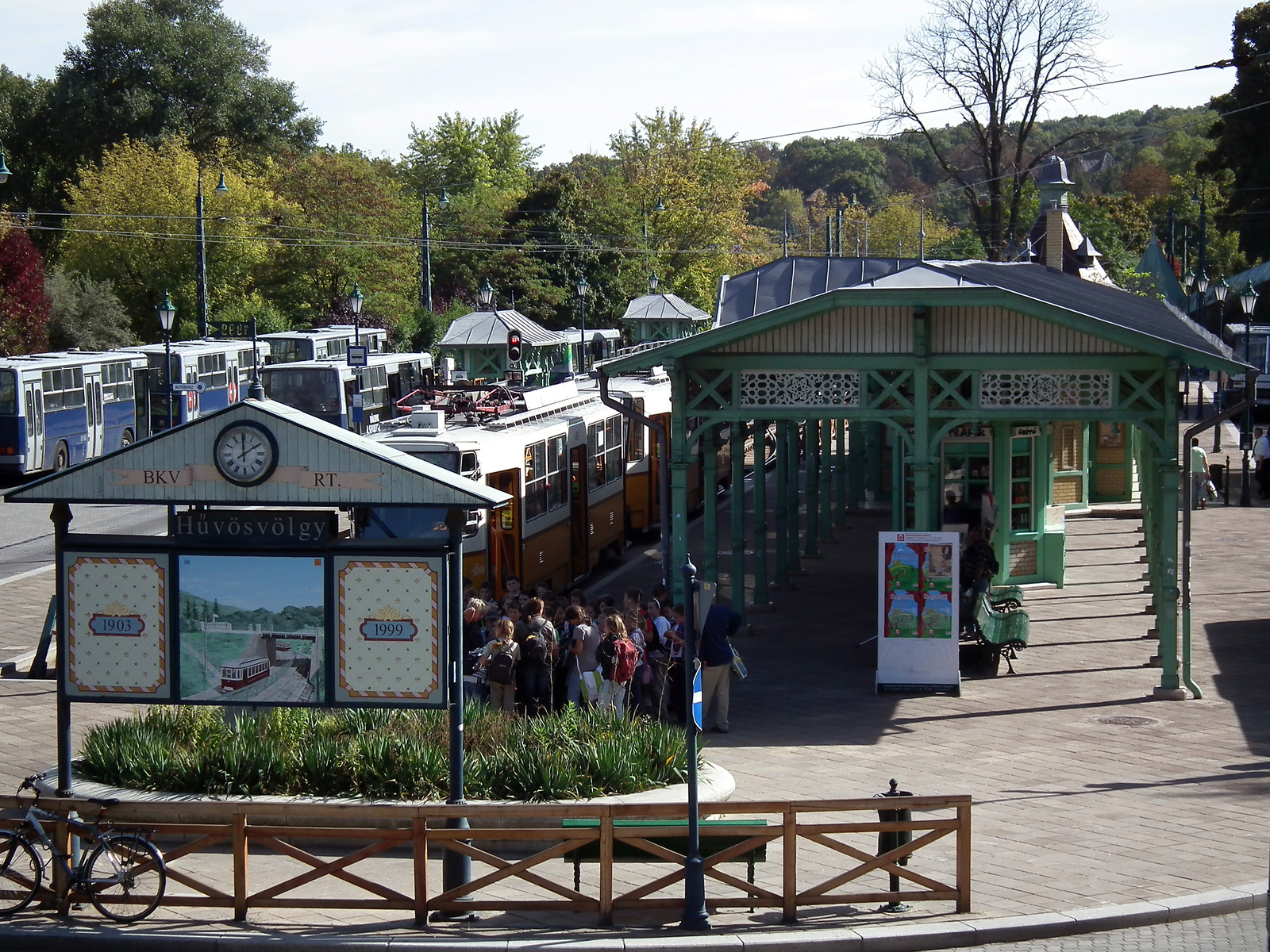

- Location of Hűvösvölgy
- Coordinates: 47.540833°N 18.963333°E
- Country: Hungary
- County: Budapest
- District: 2nd District

Area
  - Total: 1.089 km^{2} (0.420 sq mi)

Population (2015)
  - Total: 1,656
  - Density: 592/km^{2} (1,530/sq mi)
- Time zone: UTC+1 (CET)
  - Summer (DST): UTC+2 (CEST)
- Postal code: 1020
- Area code: (+36) 1

Hűvösvölgy is a neighbourhood in the 2nd District of Budapest. The area is a popular hiking destination and is also an important transport hub. The suburb is known for its terminus of the Budapest Children's Railway. A public transport terminus connects settlements north of the Buda (Nagykovácsi, Remeteszőlős, Solymár) with Buda city centre.
