= Cupola (cave formation) =

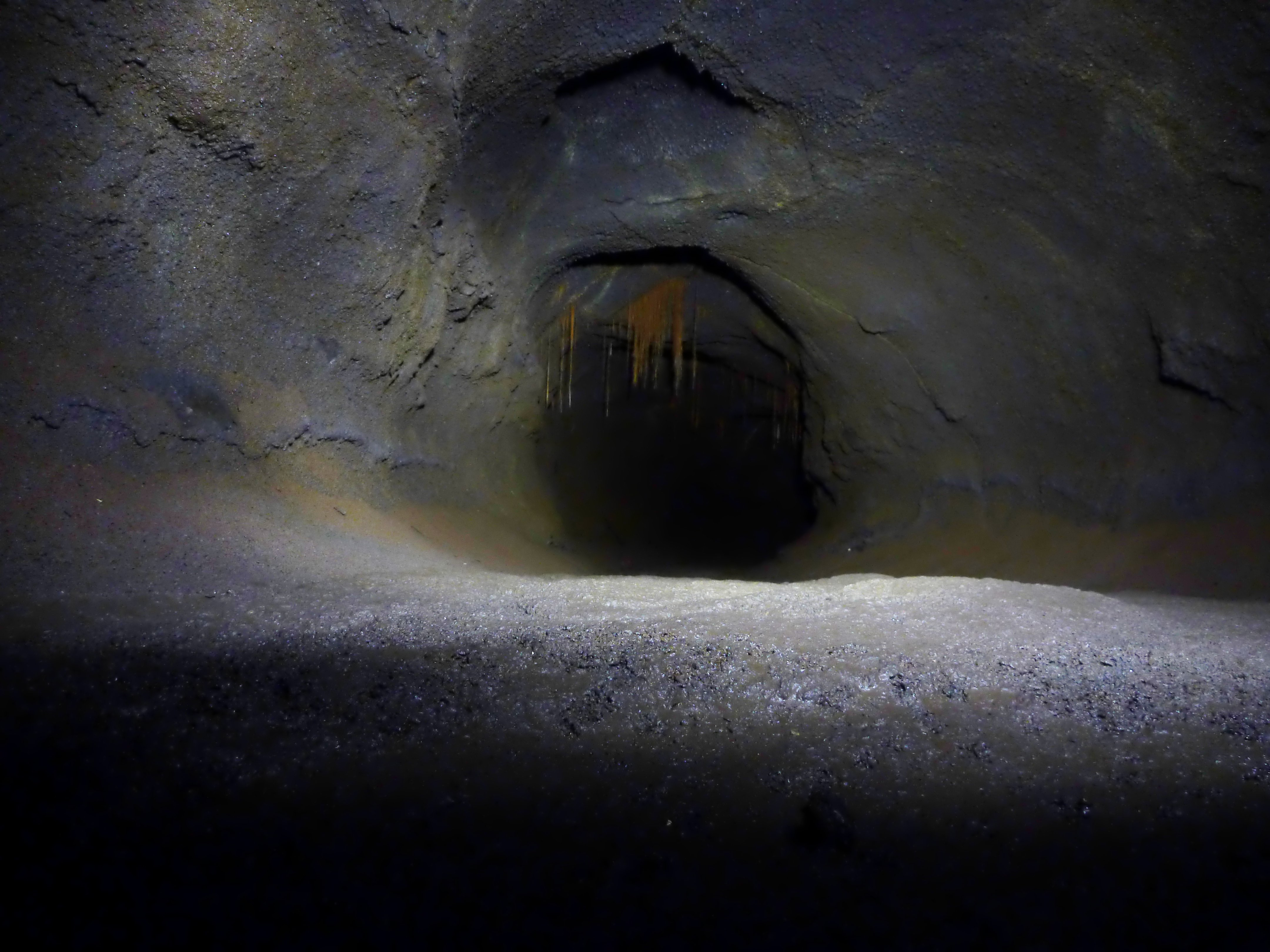
Two cupolas in the roof of Thurston Lava Tube of Hawaii. They are visible just before the roots hanging down from the ceiling, and again near the top center of the photo.

A cupola is a recess, indentation, or cavity in the ceiling of a lava tube, a kind of cave formation. Cupolas may originate from partial collapse of the ceiling, inflation of the roof by gas or lava pressure, or from a roofed-over site of a former tube overflow. They can be situated anywhere in a lava tube but are most common in lower-level passages.

== See also ==
- Spherical niches
