= László Báthory =

Pauline monk and the first translator of the Bible into Hungarian

Lászlo Báthory
- Born: Császári Bátori László c. 1420; Nyírcsászári, Hungary
- Died: 27 February 1456 (aged 35–36); Monastery of St Lawrence at Buda, Hungary
- Occupation: Pauline monk
- Known for: Bible translation
- Notable work: first Bible translated into Hungarian

László Báthory de Császár (Hungarian: Császári Bátori László) (c. 1420 – 27 February 1456) was a Pauline monk and the first translator of the Bible into Hungarian.

== Background ==
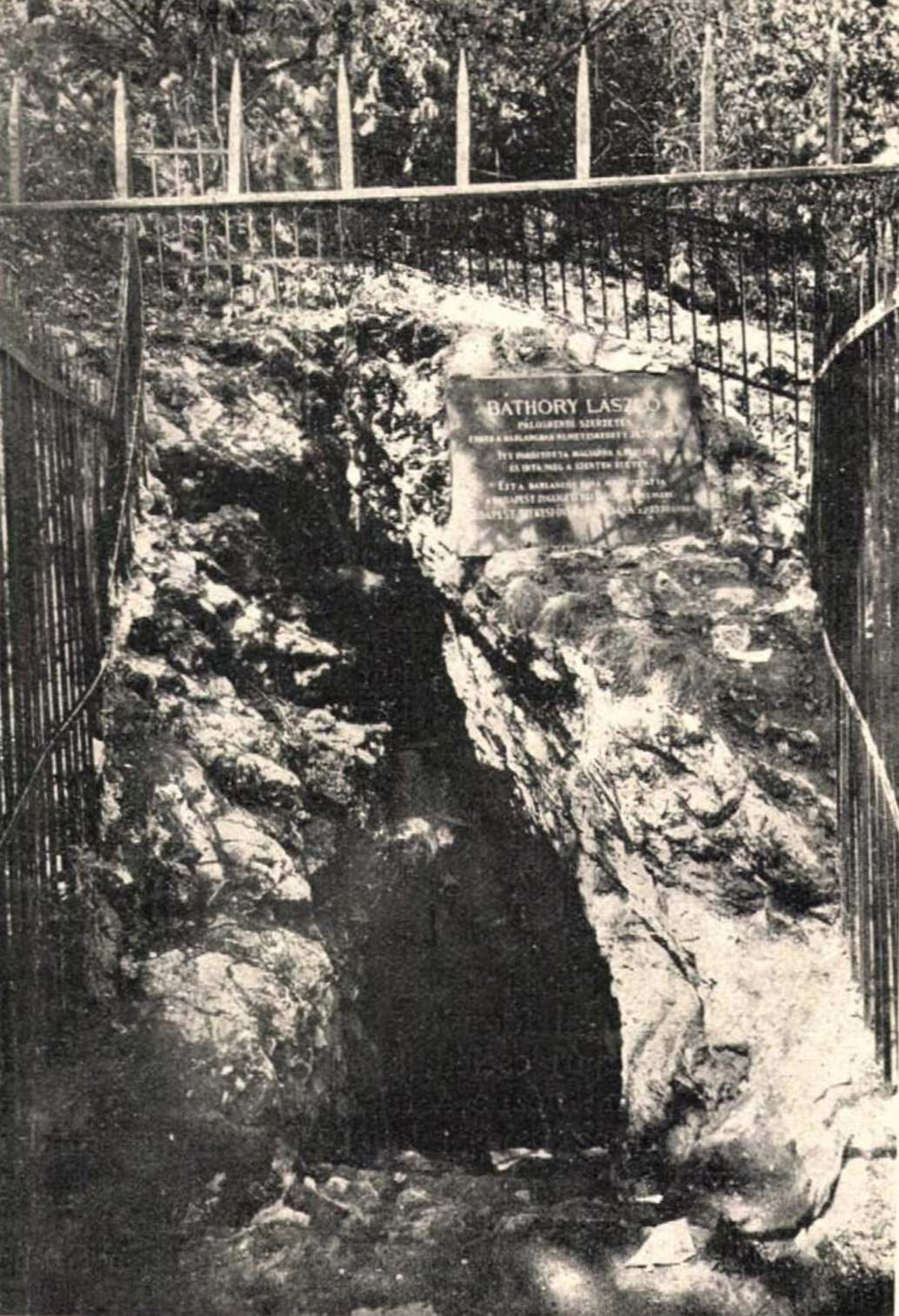
The former memorial plaque at the Bathory Cave

Báthory (also Báthori or Bátori) was born around 1420 in Nyírcsászári. Little is known of his early life. It is possible he belonged to the aristocratic Báthory family. He completed his university studies in Italy and France. After returning to Hungary, he took part in John Hunyadi's campaign against the Ottomans. He grew disillusioned with the court of Ladislaus V and entered monastic life with the Pauline order.

He then dedicated his life to the theology, translating the Bible into Hungarian, and writing hagiographies of the lives of many saints. Seeking solitude to focus on his work, he left the monastery and retreated to a small cave at the top of Nagy-Hárs Hill (Great Linden Hill). He lived as a hermit there from 1437 to 1457. During this time he translated the Bible from Latin. Eventually he returned to the Monastery of St Lawrence at Buda, where he died. His work was also found among the Bibliotheca Corviniana of Matthias Corvinus, but was lost during the Ottoman rule of Hungary. He was still attending mass on the day of his death. He was buried in the church of the monastery, in front of the altar of St Stephen.

Following the 1525 Chronicle of the Pauline Chief Sergeant by Gergely Gyöngyösi and the book published by Péter Bod in 1766, it is assumed that one of the first Hungarian translations may have been written by László Báthory from 1456. The first versions of the Hungarian Bible translations were made during the 15th century, but no contemporary copies have survived. However, the 16th century Jordánszky Codex is most likely a copy of Báthory's work in the 15th century. The 18th century portrait of Báthory, believed to have been painted by a Pauline monk from Szentlőrinc in 1456, is preserved in the Hungarian National Museum.

== Legacy ==
The cave he used as a hermitage was opened in 1911 as Bathory Cave. A black marble slab commemorating his work was placed outside the cave, a small wooden house was built in front of the entrance, and in 1931 a marble altar was designed by Imre Havran. Today, only the broken pieces of the marble slab remain. The cave is closed and can only be visited with an escort.

Poet Sándor Reményik wrote a poem in front of the Bathory Cave.

The László Báthory Scout team #442, in District XII of Budapest was named in his honor.

In 1984, 14,500 copies of the biblical manuscripts, copies of Báthory's translation of the Bible and kept in the library of the Esztergom Basilica, were published as the Jordánszky Codex It also contains the study made by Csaba Csapodi of the Jordánszky Codex.
