= Ferenc Hill =

Hill in Budapest, Hungary

Highest point
- Elevation: 869 ft (265 m)
- Coordinates: 47°31′38″N 19°00′46″E

Geography
- Location: 2nd district of Budapest, Hungary

Ferenc Hill is located in the Buda Hills in the 2nd district of Budapest.

== Background ==
The mountain is 265 meters high, a flat narrow ridge that joins the group of the Three Border Mountain. It is located northwest of József-hegy. Its surface is formed of nummulite limestone on the Upper Triassic dolomite base, and "briozoi" and "Buda marl" is also found here.

The northern slope of the promontory, which overlooks the Pál Valley and the Zöldmáli Valley, is very steep, but the eastern, western and especially southern sides are already sloping. To the southeast, spacious saddles separate it from Rókus Hill and József-hegy. The ridge of Ferenc Hill stretches west to the Géza Gárdonyi meadow, but the name of the mountain only applies to the part between Törökvész road and Pusztaszeri út. It is named after one of the statues erected here in the 18th century. On the ridge and on the north slope there is a karst forest, while on the south slope there are houses with gardens. The mountain is excellent for bird watching: blackbird, blue tit, chaffinch, greenfinch, great spotted woodpecker and firecrest can also be observed here.

At the south-western end of the hill is the closed and licensed Ferenc-hegyi cave, and part of the town Vérhalom.

== Scouting ==
The 1928 Scouting World Conference was held in Budapest, with a May 6 rally at the Hárshegy Training Park attended by 9,647 Scouts. The Chief Scout, Lord Robert Baden-Powell of Gilwell visited in Budapest, from May 5–8, 1928. On May 7, he visited at the Hárshegy Training Park, and left his footprint on the sand. The Hungarian scouts made the B-P's Footprint statue in the Harshegy Training Park.

The Hárshegy Training Park was located on Ferenc Hill, and the street address of the HQ was Hárshegy út 7. From 1927 and 1948 it was the central leader training park (the Hungarian Gilwell Park) of the Hungarian Scout Association. In 1948, the communist regime destroyed the scout park, and banned the scout movement. The Council Rock is still there.

== Bibliography ==
- Ráday, Mihály; Mészáros, György; Buza, Péter (1998). Budapest teljes utcanévlexikona [The complete street name lexicon of Budapest]. Budapest: Dinasztia Kiadó – Gemini Kiadó. ISBN 9636571767. OCLC 500239527.
- Miklós, Pápa [in Hungarian]; György, Dénes [in Hungarian] (1982). Budai-hegység útikalauz. Budapest. ISBN 963-253-300-3.
- László Berza, ed. (1993). Budapest lexikon I. (A–K) (2 ed.). Budapest: Akadémiai. pp. 422–423. ISBN 963-05-6410-6.
