= Danube-Ipoly National Park =

National park of Hungary

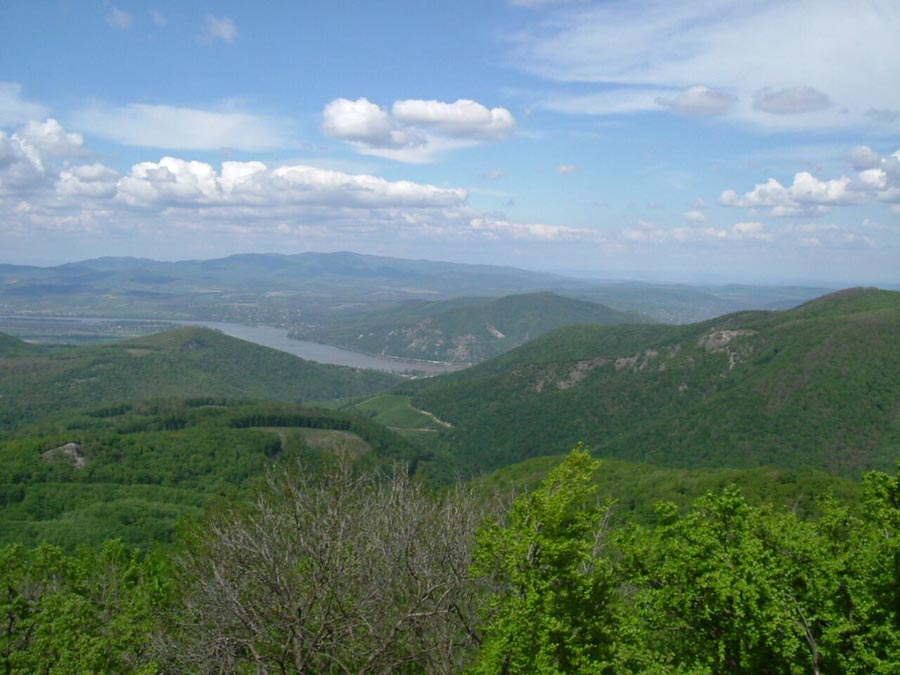
- Danube Bend from Dobogókő (Visegrád Hills) View from Dobogókő to the Danube Bend.
- Interactive map of Danube-Ipoly National Park
- Type: National Park
- Location: Hungary
- Coordinates: 47°46′N 18°57′E
- Area: 603.14 km^{2} (232.87 sq mi)
- Created: 1997
- Operator: National Parks Directorate
- Status: Open
- Website: www.dinpi.hu

Danube-Ipoly National Park is one of the most diverse national parks in Hungary.

== Background ==
In 1997, the park was created from Pilis and Börzsöny national parks, with the addition of part of the floodplain of the River Ipoly. This park encompasses areas in Budapest, Pest County, Komárom-Esztergom County and Fejér County, including some smaller Danube islands. Its offices are in Budapest and in the Jókai garden (Budapest XII), and its headquarters are in Esztergom.

Some species – both flora and fauna – have their sole habitat in this park, and there is a programme to save these rare and endangered species.
