= Budapest Children's Railway =

Railway line in Budapest, Hungary

Gyermekvasút

Overview
- Status: In service
- Owner: Hungarian State Railways (MÁV)
- Line number: 7
- Termini: Széchenyihegy; Hűvösvölgy
- Stations: 8
- Website: https://gyermekvasut.hu/

Service
- Operator: Hungarian State Railways (MÁV)

History
- Opened: 1948-1950

Technical
- Track length: 11.2 km (7.0 mi)
- Track gauge: 760 mm (2 ft 5 15/16 in)
- Operating speed: 20 km/h (12 mph)

The Gyermekvasút (English: Children's Railway) or Line 7 is a narrow gauge railway line in Budapest, which connects, via six stations, Széchenyihegy and Hűvösvölgy and is 11.2 kilometres (7.0 mi) long. It is one of Budapest's transport attractions located between the 2nd and 12th districts, most notable for that the service is provided by children under the supervision of adults. The former name of the line was Úttörővasút (Pioneer Railway, in reference to the communist scouts), and now the official designation is MÁV Zrt. Széchenyi-hegy Gyermekvasút. Except the train driver, all of the posts are operated by children aged 10–14 under adult supervision. It was the world's largest children's railway, until the expansion of one in Svobodny, Russia.

The Széchenyihegy terminus of the Gyermekvasút is a 250-metre (820 ft) walk from the upper terminus of the Budapest Cog Railway, whilst the Hűvösvölgy terminus is adjacent to the Budapest tram terminus of the same name. The two end stations of the line are Széchenyihegy and Hűvösvölgy, located 235 meters lower in sea level. The track is 11.7 km long, single-track with passing points at stations, not electrified. The trains cover the distance between the two terminals at a maximum permitted speed of 20 km/h in an average of 40–45 minutes (approx. 50 in summer, due to longer station dwells).

In 2015, the line was entered into the Guinness World Records as the longest railway line in the world where traffic and commercial service are operated by children. The railway transported approximately 800,000 passengers in 1961, 94,000 in 1993, and nearly 300,000 in 2013. The railway also acts as the season-opening event of the Carpathian Basin Small Railways' Day at second Saturday of April every year.

== Pedagogical aspects of Railway Service for Children ==
During Hungary's communist era it was often thought that the line was likely built for propaganda purposes. However, in practice, it was no more politicized than any other communist children's institute in the 1950's and 60's. The free and playful employment of children before the opening of the then called Pioneer Railway caused controversy amongst people. Practical experiences refuted theses objections, and the railway turned out to be a great success, which quickly got oversubscribed amongst children wanting to serve on the railway. The last more than seven decades have proven that the children's railway community and the services performed in a playful form are useful and almost incomparable to any youth and adult experiences and have provided a good foundation for children wanting to start a career at the railways.

== History ==
In 1947, the Hungarian State Railways (MÁV) company decided that a railway operated by children would be built. For the railway construction several sites were considered, including the neighbourhood of the Gödöllő Palace, Margaret Island, and the Népliget, but finally in 1948 the Hungarian Communist Party chose the Buda Hills. The construction started on 11 April 1948.

The first section, from Széchenyi-hegy to Előre station (now Virágvölgy) was inaugurated on 31 July 1948. The second section, to Szépjuhászné station (now Szépjuhászné), was completed one year later, and the last section, to Hűvösvölgy, was opened on 20 August 1950.

During the Hungarian Revolution of 1956 the railway was closed but was not damaged. It reopened on 3 February 1957.

A museum at Hűvösvölgy station displays some items from the Communist period.
