= Bastion Promenade =

Promenade in the Castle Quarter in the 1st District of Budapest, capital of Hungary

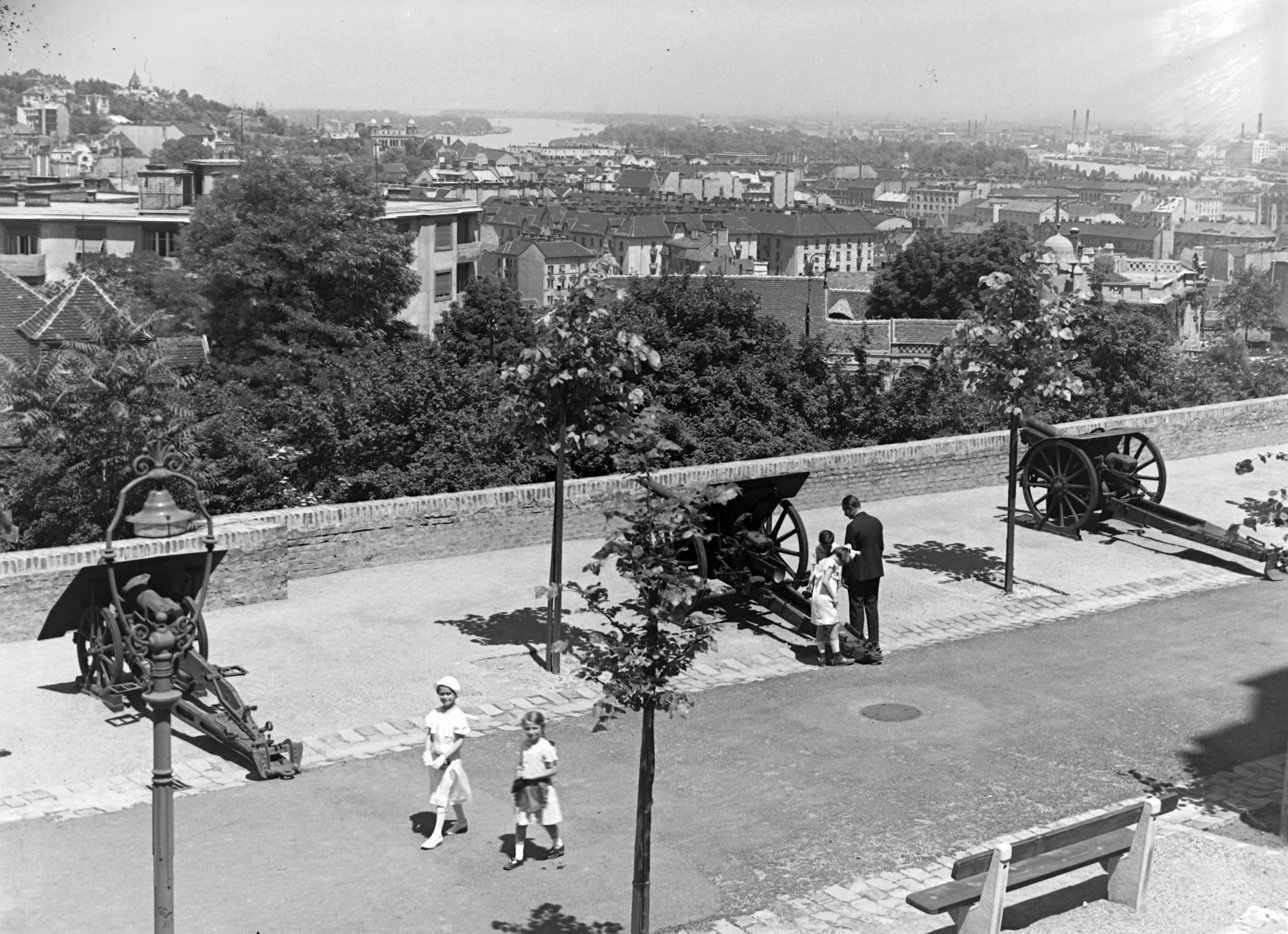
Bastion Promenade

The Bastion Promenade (Hungarian: Bástya sétány) was a promenade in the Castle Quarter in the 1st District of Budapest, capital of Hungary.

== Background ==
It ran behind the Western, Northern and partly the Eastern wall of the Castle. Earlier it was a mixture of alleys used for defending goals. When defence importance of the Castle declined, the style of the alleys were changed, these were no longer part of the fortification structure. Western part was afforested, then opened for the public in 1936 for the 250th anniversary of Buda’s Recapture. World War II caused major damages in the promenade, so it was rebuilt between 1966-1970 on the basis of the modern nursery techniques and it was divided to two sections. Today these are the next ones:

- Tóth Árpád sétány, Western part of the promenade. Anjou Bastion and memorial stone of Buda’s last Pasha is located here.
- Babits Mihály sétány, Eastern part. Northern and Eastern part is connected by Vienna Gate. End of the Eastern part is at the Erdélyi Bastion.
