= Erdélyi Bastion =

Bastion in Budapest, Hungary

- Erdélyi bástya
- Part of Várnegyed
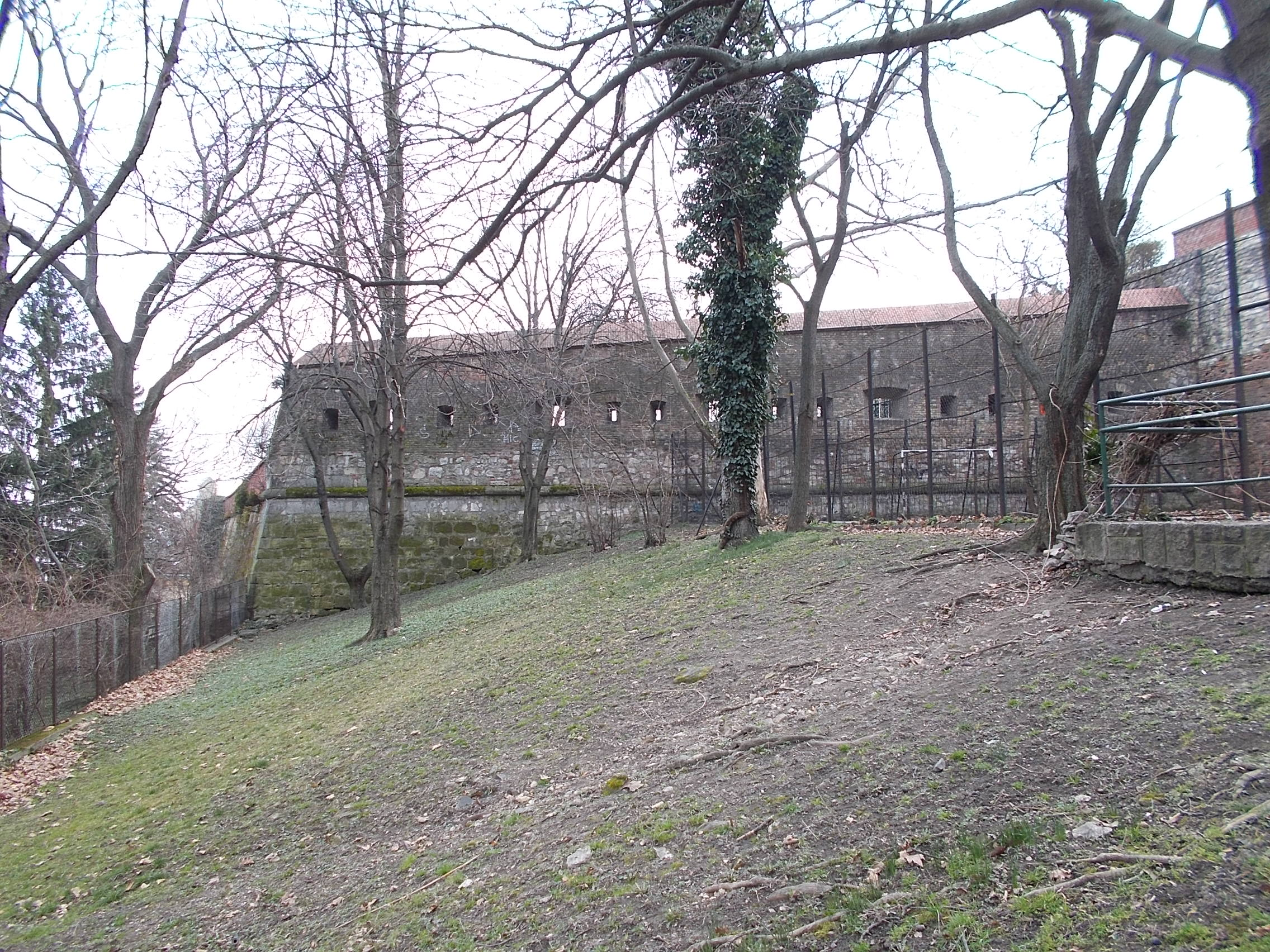

Location
- Coordinates: 47.5047°N 19.0333°E

Erdélyi Bastion is a bastion at Buda Castle in Budapest, Hungary. It is sometimes called in English the Transylvanian bastion.

== Background ==
It is the strongest part of the fortifications east of the Vienna Gate. Its floor plan is multi cornered; it looks like an Old Italian fortification. It may have been designed by Domenico da Bologna, although Paolo Giovio wrote that it had been built by János Szapolyai during the 1530s. The bastion is 50 meters long and 22 meters wide. Its wedge shaped facades are connected to the wall of the castle with wings.
