= Anjou Bastion =

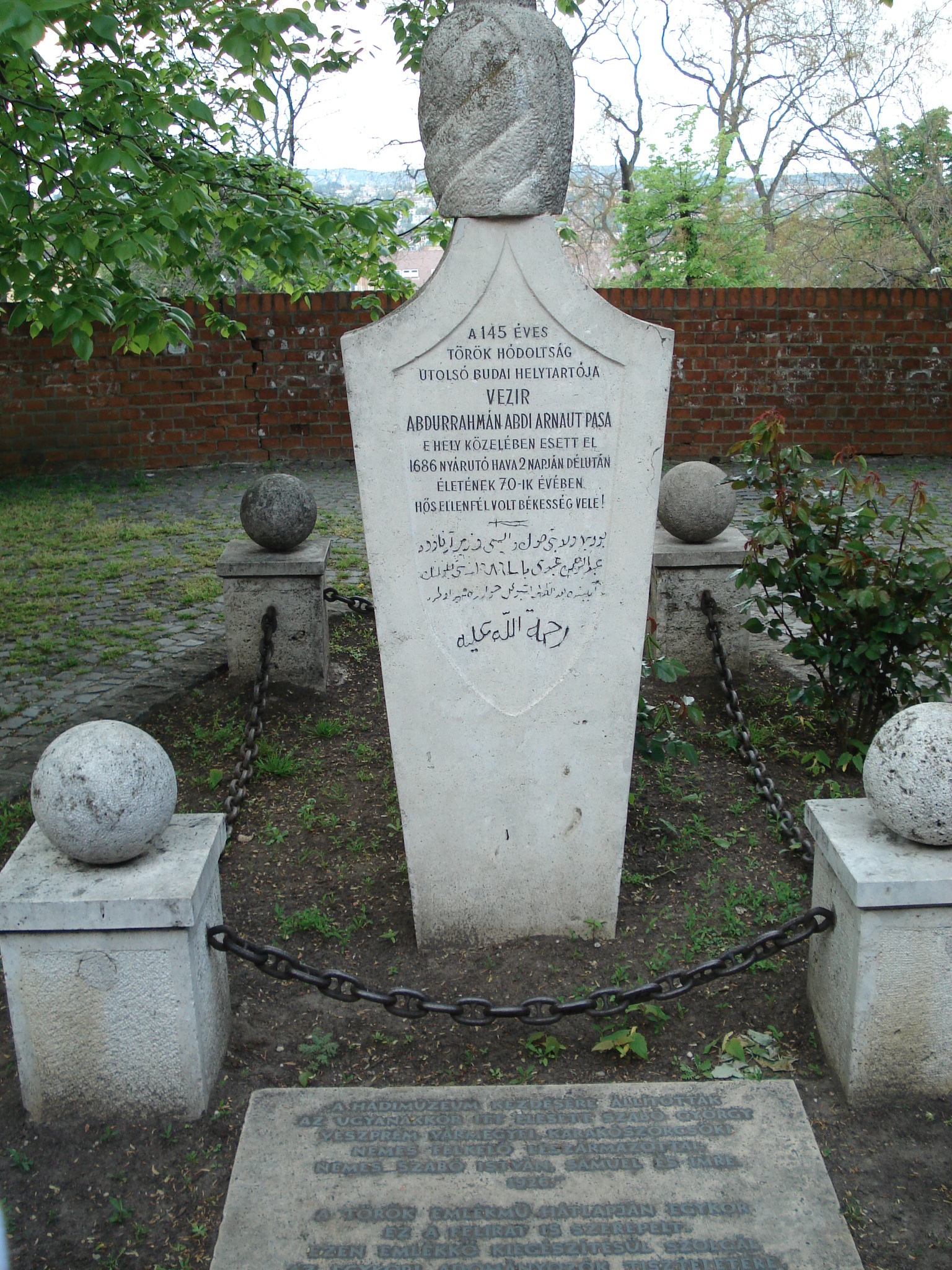
Memorial stone of Abdurrahman Pasha

Anjou Bastion is located on the Northern part of Bastion Promenade, between Esztergomi rondella and the Vienna Gate Square, in the Castle District of Buda in Budapest, Hungary.

== Background ==
The wall of the castle is strengthened with the towers of Siyavuş Pasha and Murad Pasha. There were heavy fights here in 1686 during the Battle of Buda. It was called Császárrés in 1696 as cited in Zaiger. After the building of the barracks it was first called Ferdinánd Bastion and later called Nándor Bastion. In 1924, it was named Prímás Bastion after János Csernoch prince primate. After the Second World War, it was renamed Anjou Bastion. Both parts are surrounded with trees. The memorial stone of the last Pashah of Buda, Abdurrahman Abdi Arnavut, who fell heroically in the front lines stands here.
