= Abdurrahman Pasha =

Abdurrahman Pasha may refer to:

- Abdi Pasha the Albanian (1616–1686), Ottoman politician and military leader
- Abdurrahman Pasha Baban, Ottoman Kurdish emir of Baban
- Abdurrahman Nurettin Pasha (1836–1912), Ottoman Grand Vizier
- Abdurrahman Abdi Pasha (court historian)
