= Várhegy =

Castle Hill Várhegy
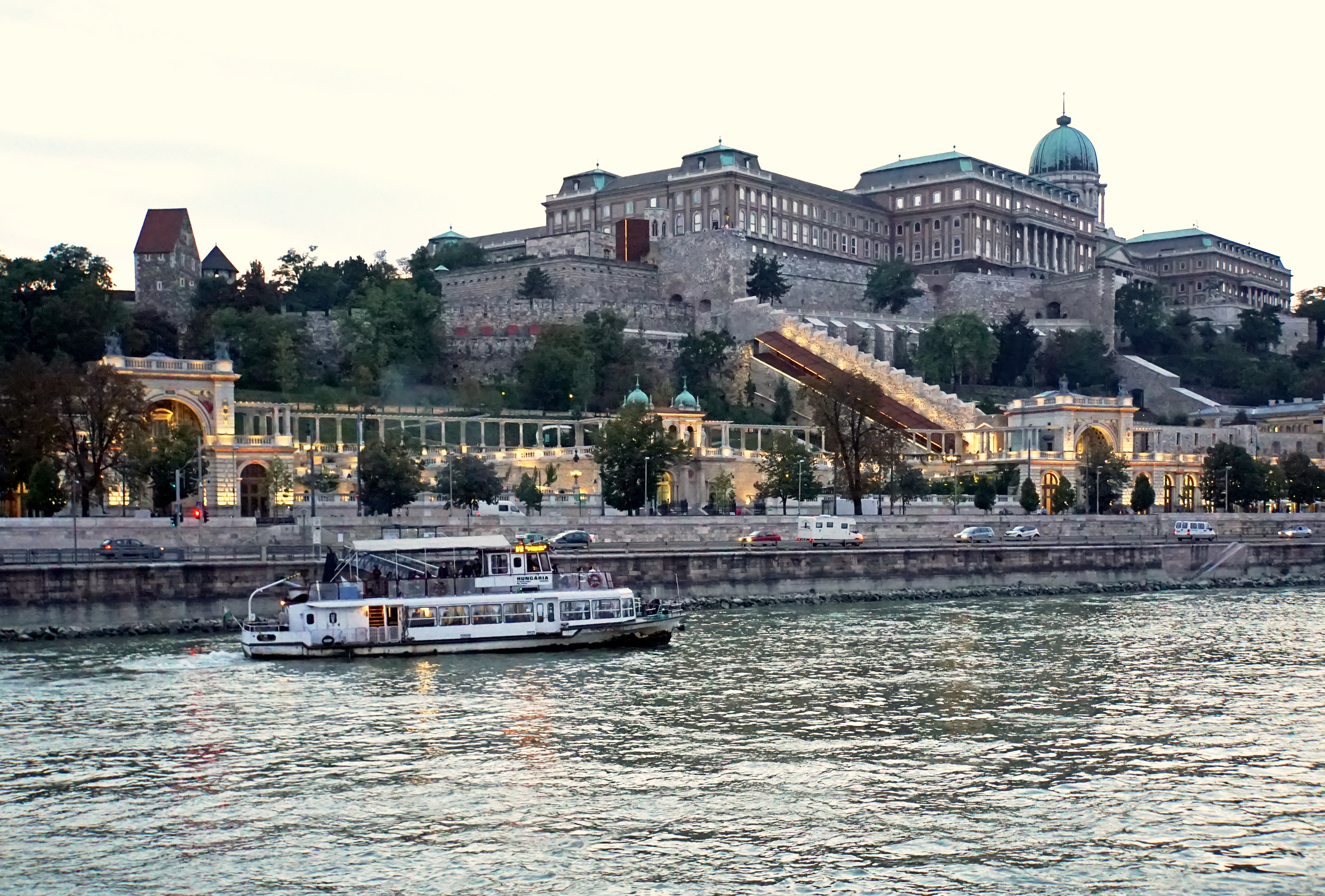
- Buda Castle
- Etymology: Castle Hill
- Interactive map of Castle Hill
- Coordinates: 47.5028°N 19.0317°E
- Country: Hungary
- City: Budapest

Castle Hill (Hungarian: Várhegy) is a hill in Budapest's 1st district. Geographically, it is connected to the Buda Hills and Rose Hill (Rózsadomb). The Castle Quarter (Várnegyed) is located on the top of the hill with many monuments around the Buda Castle. The area is one of the most popular attractions in the capital, and can be accessed by bus or in the carriages of a funicular (Budavári sikló).

== Background ==
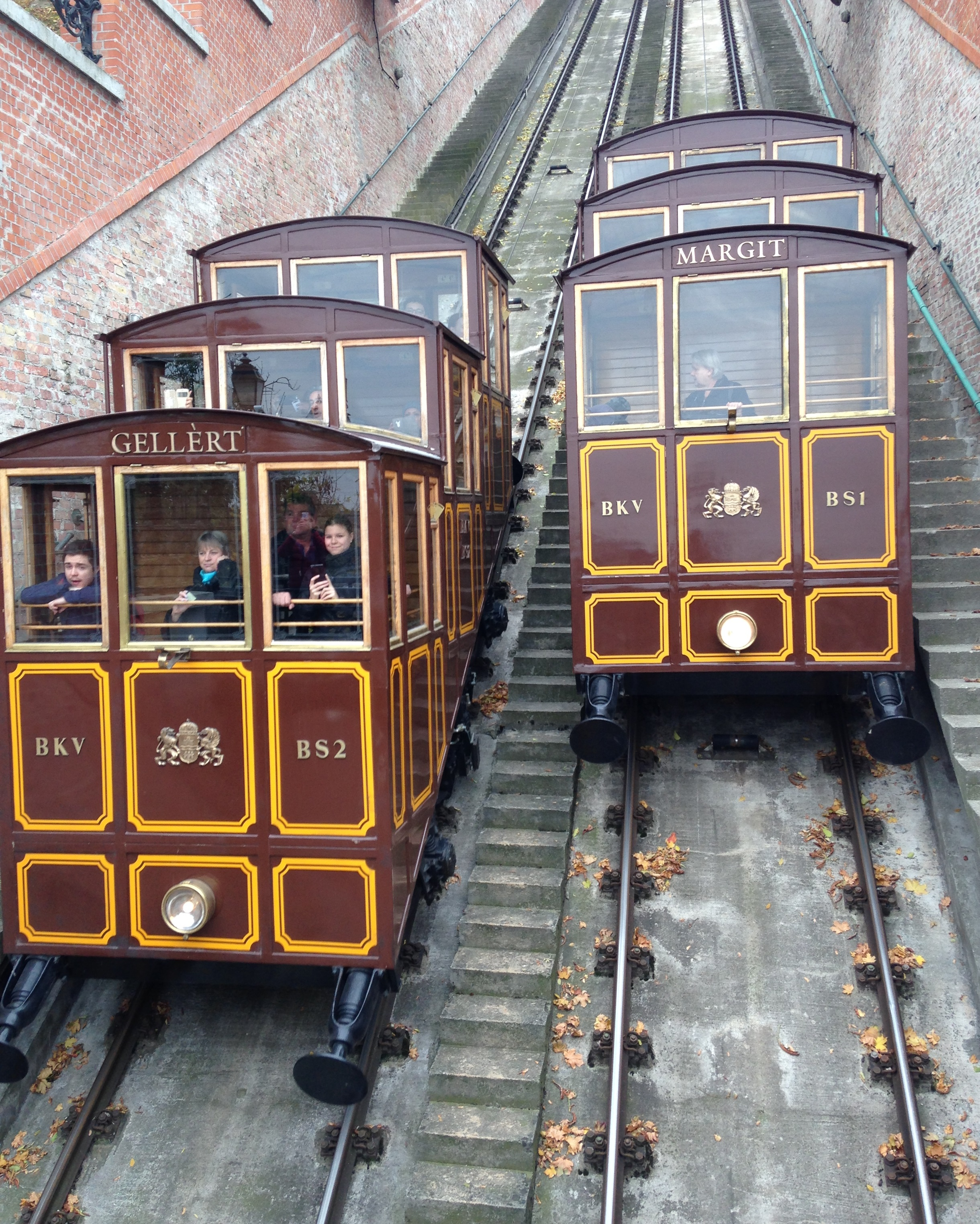
Budapest funicular

The hill rises to a height of 175 metres (574 ft) above sea level on the right bank of the Danube River, part of the Buda Hills, between Gellért Hill and Rose Hill. it is approximately 1.5 kilometres (0.93 mi) long and 0.4 kilometres (0.25 mi) wide. It can be reached by funicular from the direction of the river and by bus from the city center.

The hill is mainly composed of Buda marl. During the Pleistocene era, 4-to-10-metre (10 to 30 ft) thick layer of travertine was deposited, protecting from erosion. Freshwater springs formed the cavities of the Buda Castle Cave.

The Castle Quarter (Várnegyed) refers to the area located within the defensive walls and bastions of the Buda Castle complex, corresponding with the medieval royal city of Buda. It is the oldest part of Budapest and the center of the quarter lies between the Royal Palace and the Matthias Church.

== History ==
All Hungarian kings have added something to the fort or the palace. King Béla IV built the first fort on Castle Hill between 1247 and 1265 after a first Mongol invasion of Hungary in 1242. Béla surrounded the settlement with fortified walls. The neighborhood grew with Hungarians and Germans, and the first royal palace was built.

During the first half of the 14th century Stephen's Tower was built, named after Stephen, son of Charles I. Prince Stephen's brother, who later became King Louis I, relocated his seat from Visegrád to Buda in 1347 and began construction of the royal palace and its defense system, which lasted two centuries. Louis's buildings were located north of Stephen's Tower, and his palace overlooked the Danube.

When he was Holy Roman Emperor, Sigismund enlarged the palace and strengthened its fortifications. Construction on the Fresh Palace (Hungarian: Friss-palota) began in the 1410s and was largely finished in the 1420s, although some minor works continued until the death of Sigismund in 1437.

In 1458, Matthias Corvinus led the last phase of large-scale building activity. During the first decades of his reign he finished the work on the Gothic palace, and the Royal Chapel, with the surviving Lower Church. Matthias' successor, Vladislaus II, carried on the works of the Matthias Palace. Under Ottoman rule, the palace fell into decay. The medieval palace was destroyed in the great siege of 1686 when Buda was captured by allied Christian forces.

With the expulsion of the Ottomans, reconstruction of the castle began and would continue for the next 150 years. Construction accelerated during the reign of Maria Theresa at the request of the Hungarian nobility. After the 1867 Austro-Hungarian pact, there was a need for a representative royal palace in Buda. In 1881 architect Miklós Ybl was commissioned to rebuild the palace.

== Gallery ==
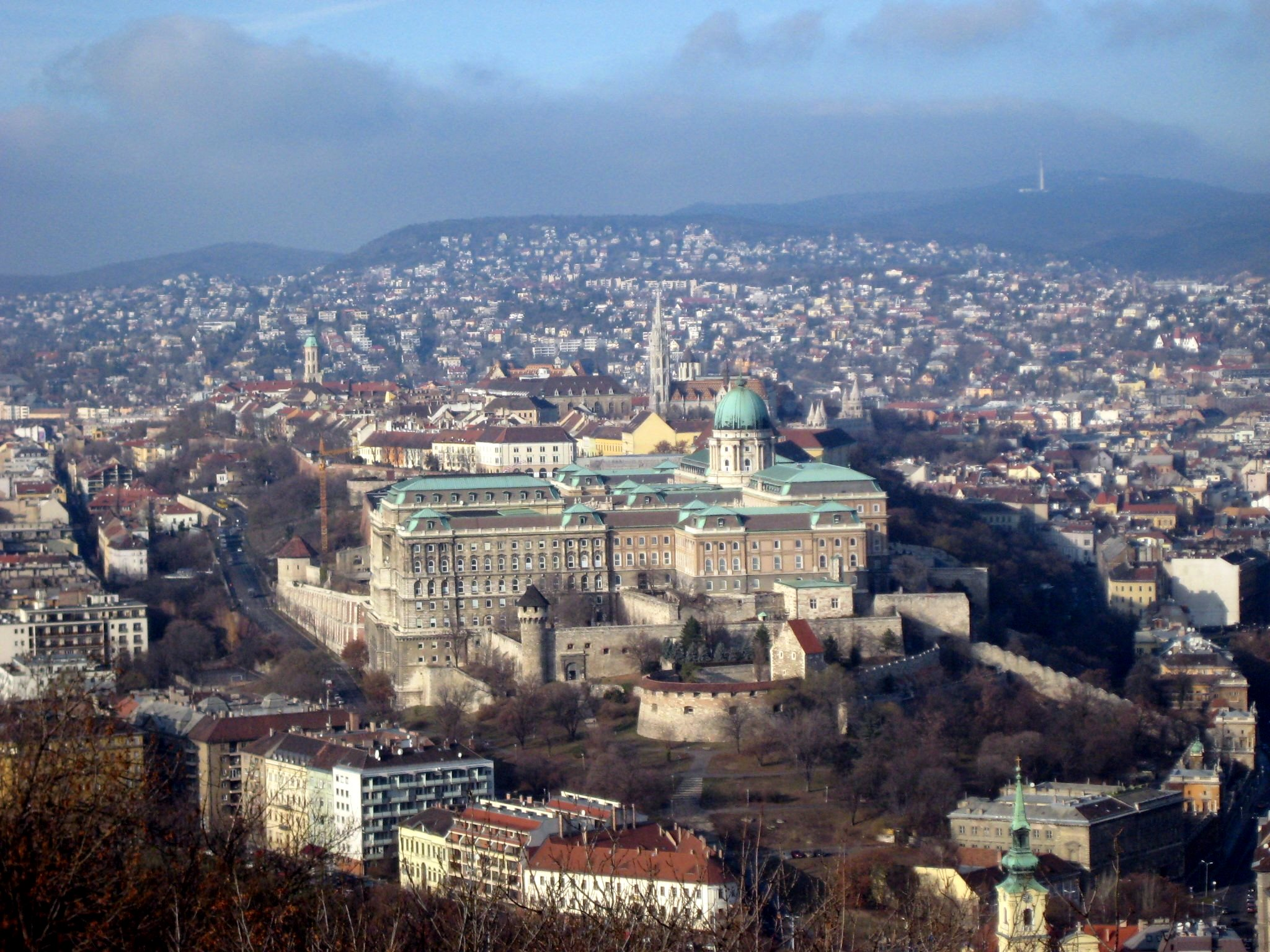
Buda Castle

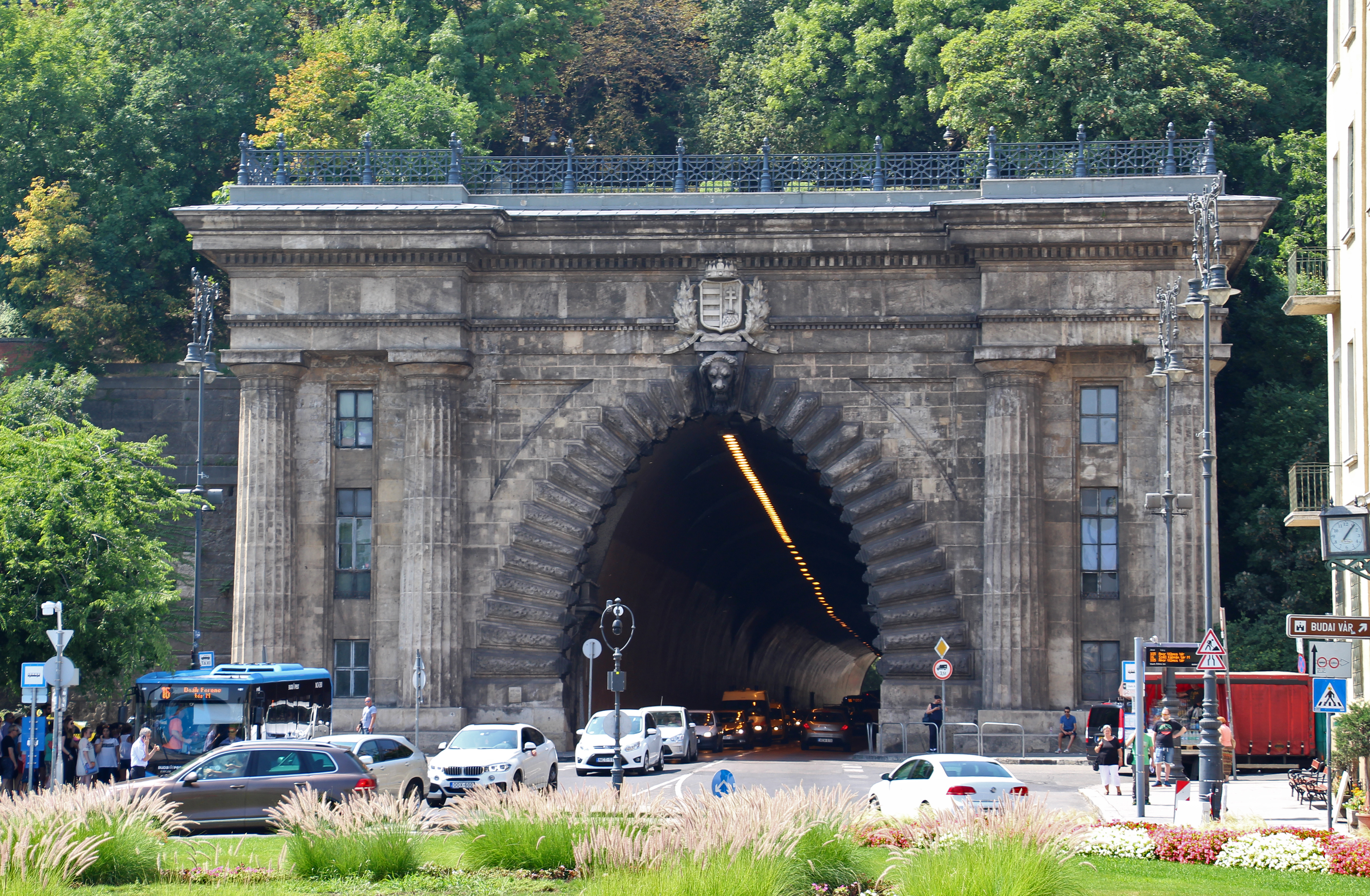
Buda Castle Tunnel

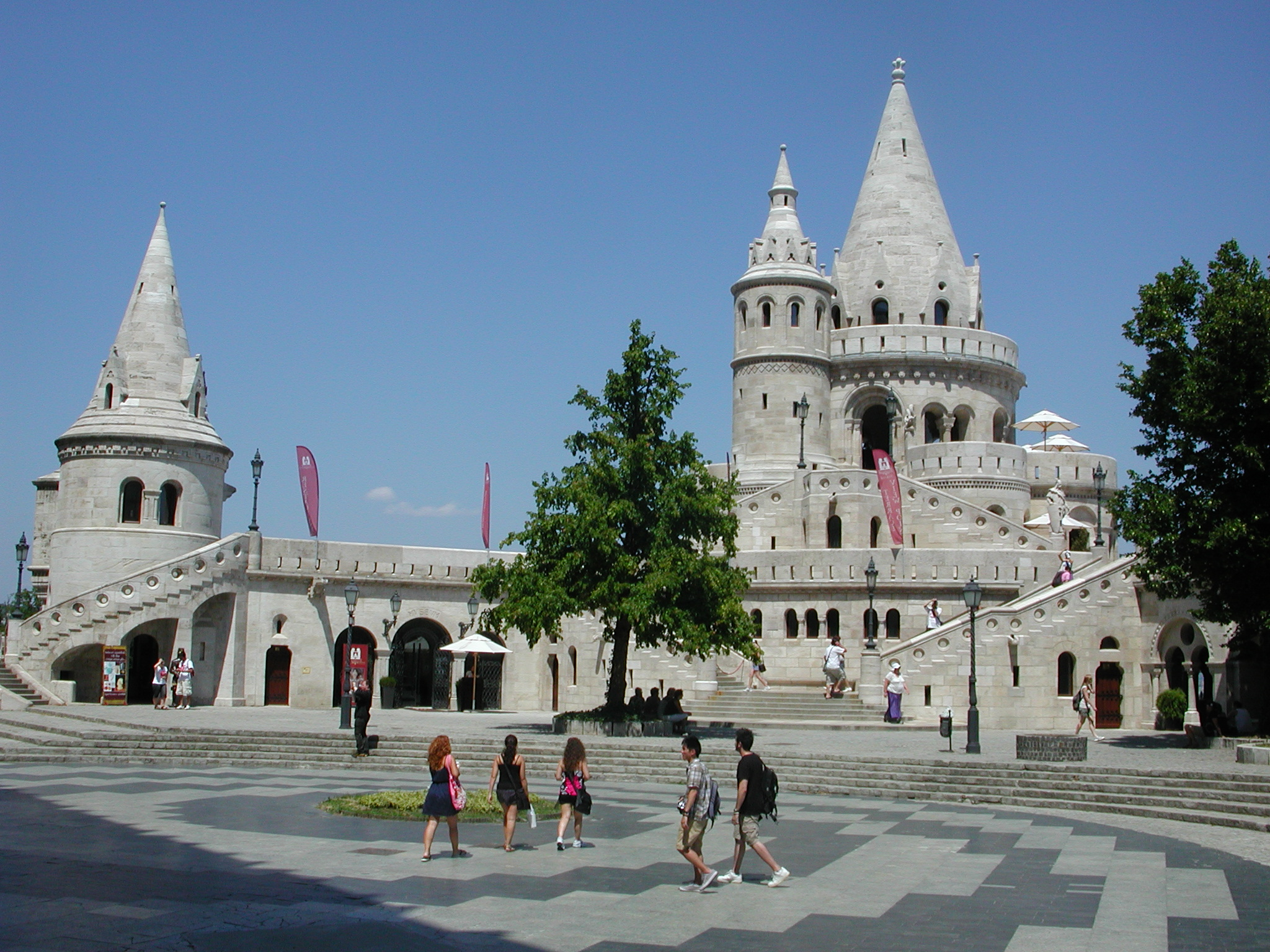
Fisherman's Bastion

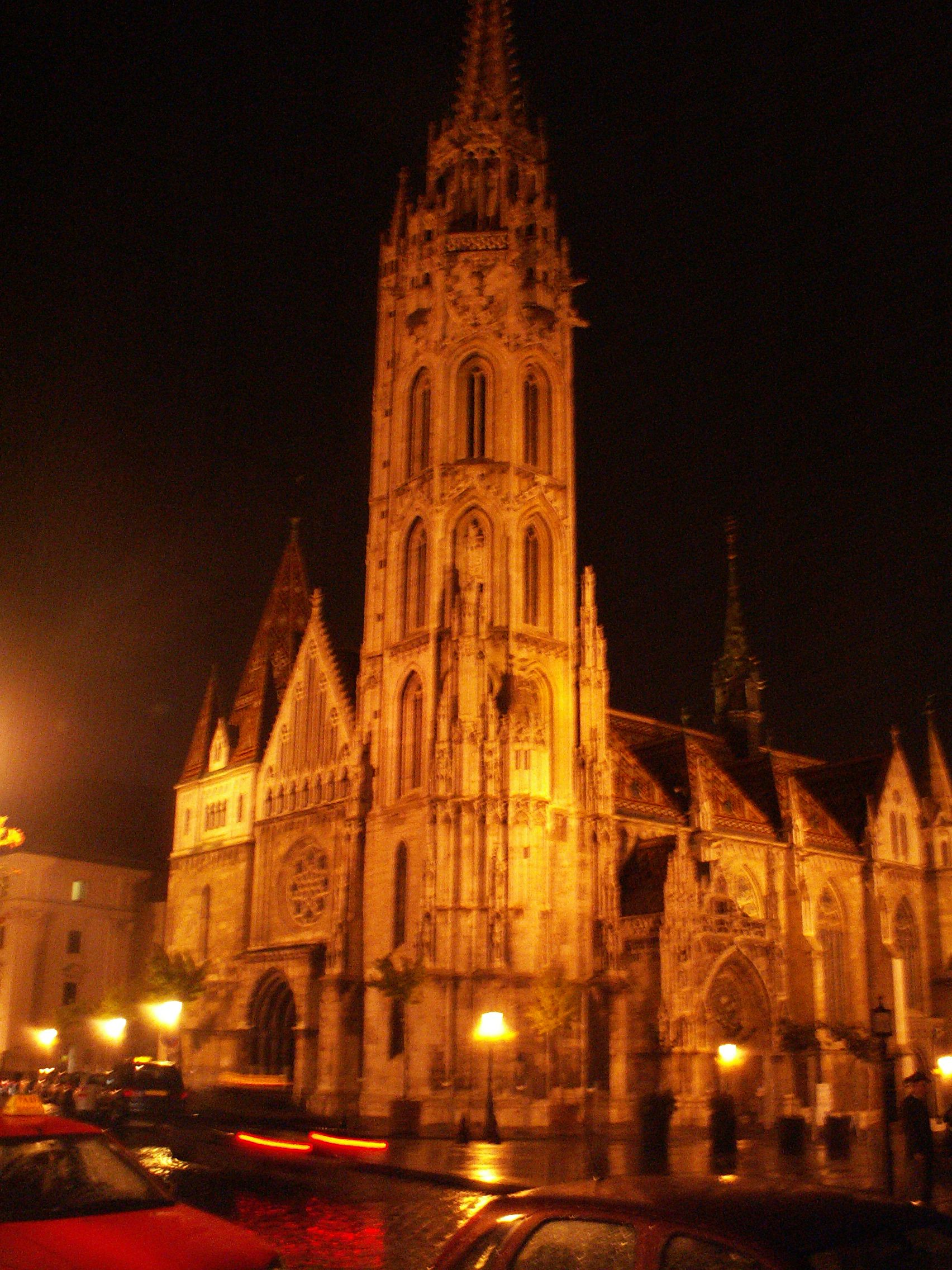
Matthias Church
