= Babits promenade, Budapest =

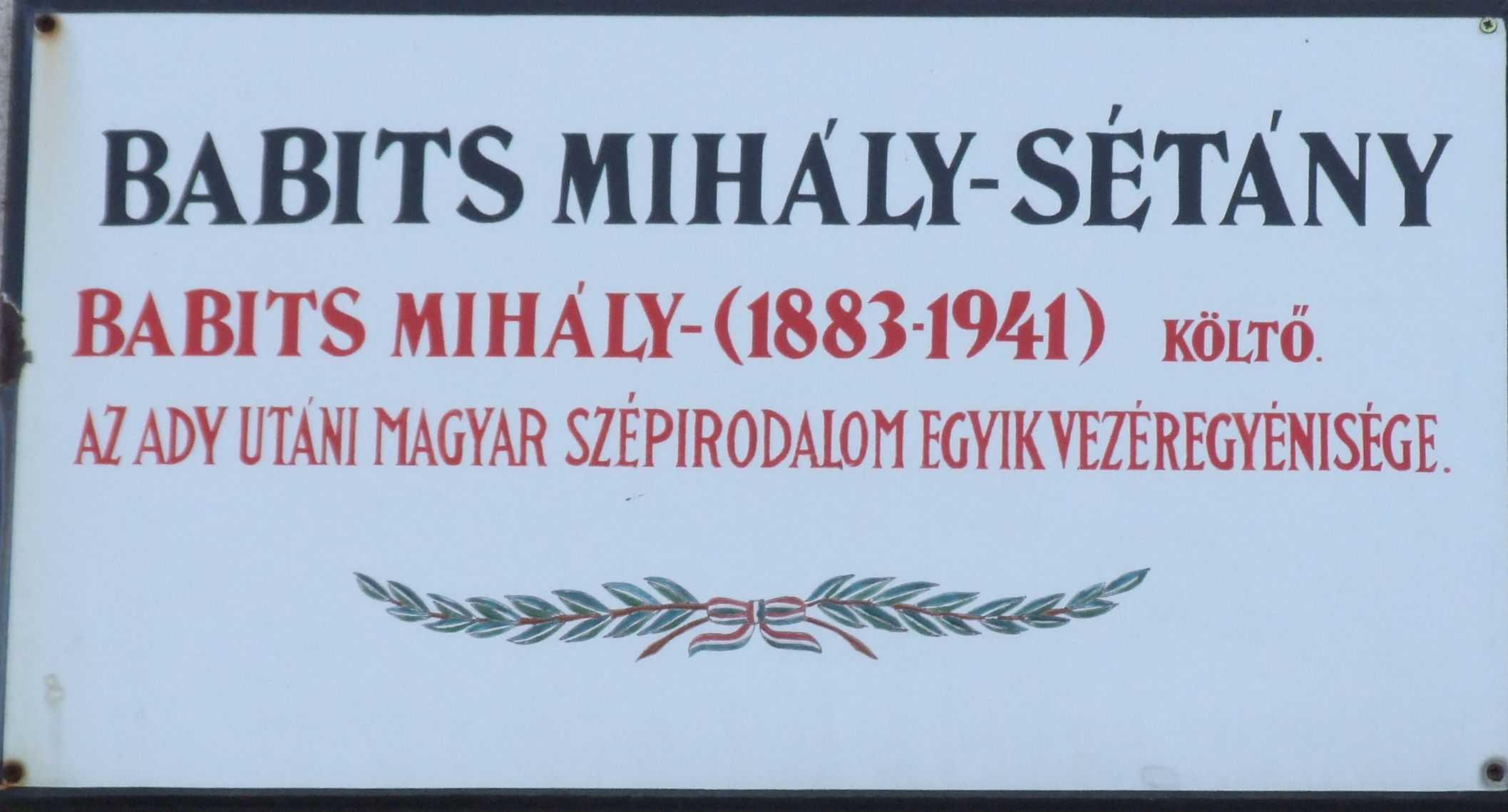
Memorial tablet of Mihály Babits at the street

The promenade of Mihály Babits is located in the Buda Castle Quarter in the 1st District of Budapest. It has been called: An der langen Wand, Bastei-Promenade, Várbástya, Bástyasétány, Horthy Miklós bastion promenade

It is located on the Eastern part of the Várhegy, between Bécsi Kapu and Erdélyi-bástya, and was surrounded by a double fortification. There were gardens on the place of the promenade till 1936, which belonged to 11-25 Táncsics Milhály utca. Before establishing these gardens there stood some buildings sitting on the Wall of the Castle. Some parts of the gardens were disestablished in 1936 and were opened for the public. Memorial tablet of Mihály Babics is here since 1965.

A 4 square metre part of the castle wall tumbled to the promenade on Christmas 2010.

Removing of ruins and restructuring after World War II was the basis of Mihály Eisemann-László Dalos, Géza Baróti’s operetta, titled Bástyasétány 77. It was remade as a film by Gyula Gazdag under the title Bástyasétány 74. While the first is a romantic work, the other is less romantic, and its screening was band up to the change of regime in 1989.

== Sources ==
Budapest lexikon I. (A–K). Főszerk. Berza László. 2., bőv. kiadás. Budapest: Akadémiai. 1993. 101. o. ISBN 963-05-6410-6
