= Castle Quarter (Budapest) =

City quarter of Budapest, Hungary

Coordinates: 47.5°N 19°E

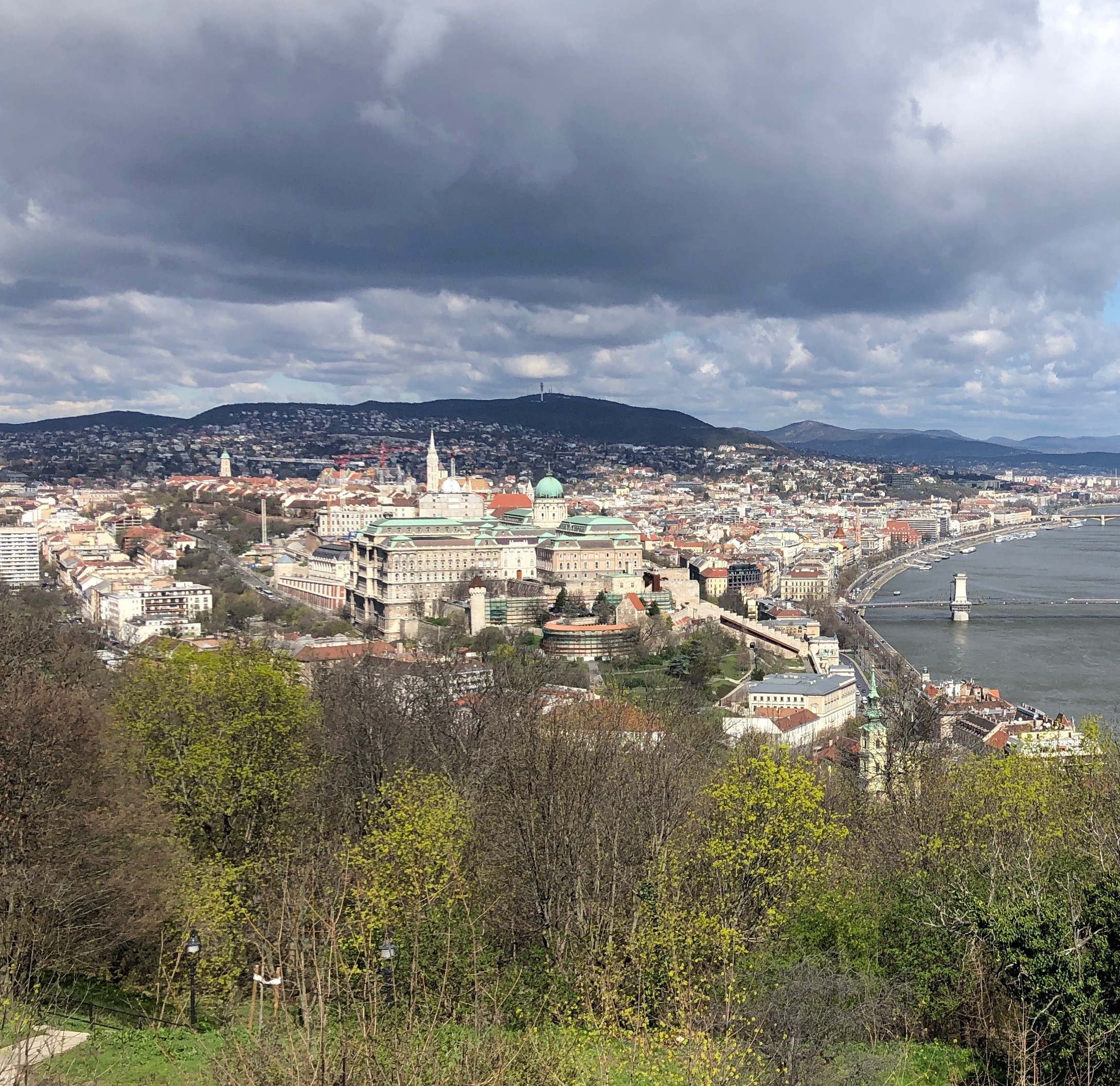
View towards Buda Castle Hill from Citadella, in the background under building: Archduke Joseph's Palace, High Command of the Hungarian Defence Forces, Red Cross/Ministry of Foreign Affairs, Finance Ministry, Castle garage III.

The Castle Quarter (Hungarian: Várnegyed [ˈvaːr.nɛ.ɟɛd]) is the part of Buda in Budapest, the capital city of Hungary, that lies within the defensive walls of the Buda Castle complex, corresponding to the medieval royal city of Buda. Located on Várhegy (lit. 'Castle Hill'), it is the oldest part of Budapest, having been continuously inhabited since 1247. The center of the neighborhood are the streets between the Royal Palace and Matthias Church.

== Notable sights ==
Viennese Gate

The "Bécsi kapu" (Vienna Gate) is one of the medieval gates of Buda. Today, it serves as an entrance to the district.

Buda Castle

The first fortress on Várhegy was built in the 13th century. Following the devastation during the Turkish occupation the whole building complex was reconstructed. It now it hosts some notable museums and other monuments, among them the national library. Dísz tér (En: Dísz Square) can be found next to the complex.

Matthias Church

A well-known church in the country. Its construction started around the same time as that of the castle. The sarcophagus of Béla III of Hungary can be seen within the building. The square in front of the church is called Szentháromság tér (En: Holy Trinity Square).

Fisherman's Bastion

The bastion was built in the beginning of the 20th century. Its terrace provides a panorama view of the city.

== Other notable monuments ==
- Baroque style apartments – the area was mainly populated after the Turkish occupation so most of the apartments carry the baroque stylistics of the 18th century, also what has been called late Rococo Zopfstil.
- Dísz Square (Budapest) – one of the main squares of the area with a nice view upon the town.
- Museum and Institute of Military – the museum provides an overview upon the history of Hungarian military.
- Museum of Telecommunication– the museum deals with the history of telecommunication.
- Church of Mary Magdalene, Budapest
- Saint Nicholas monastery and church, Budapest
- Arany Sas Museum of Medicine
- Lutheran Church of Budavár
- National Archives of Hungary
- Hospital in the Rock - The site served as a shelter during the bombings; now it is an exhibition.

== Gallery ==
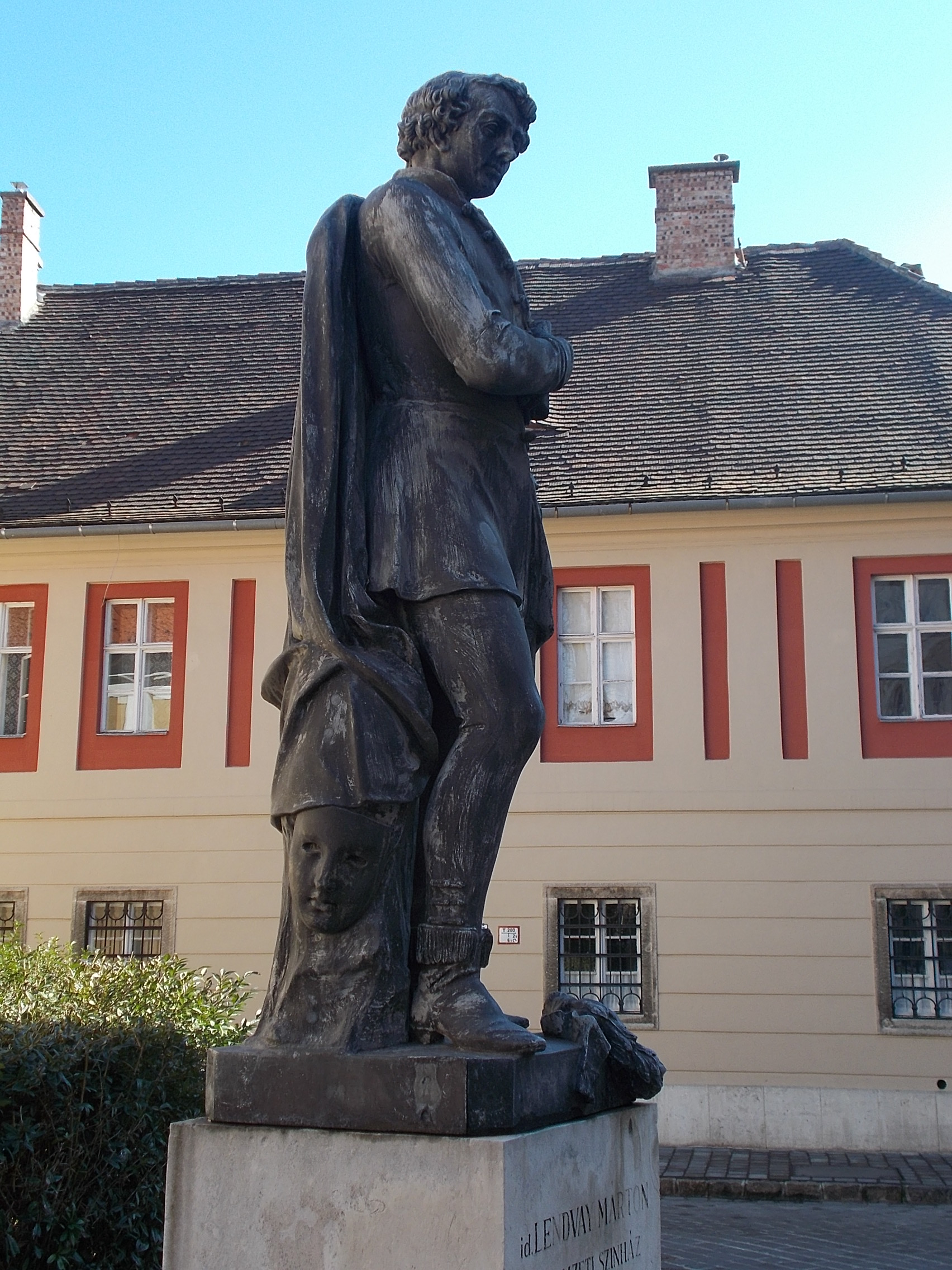
Statue of Márton Lendvay

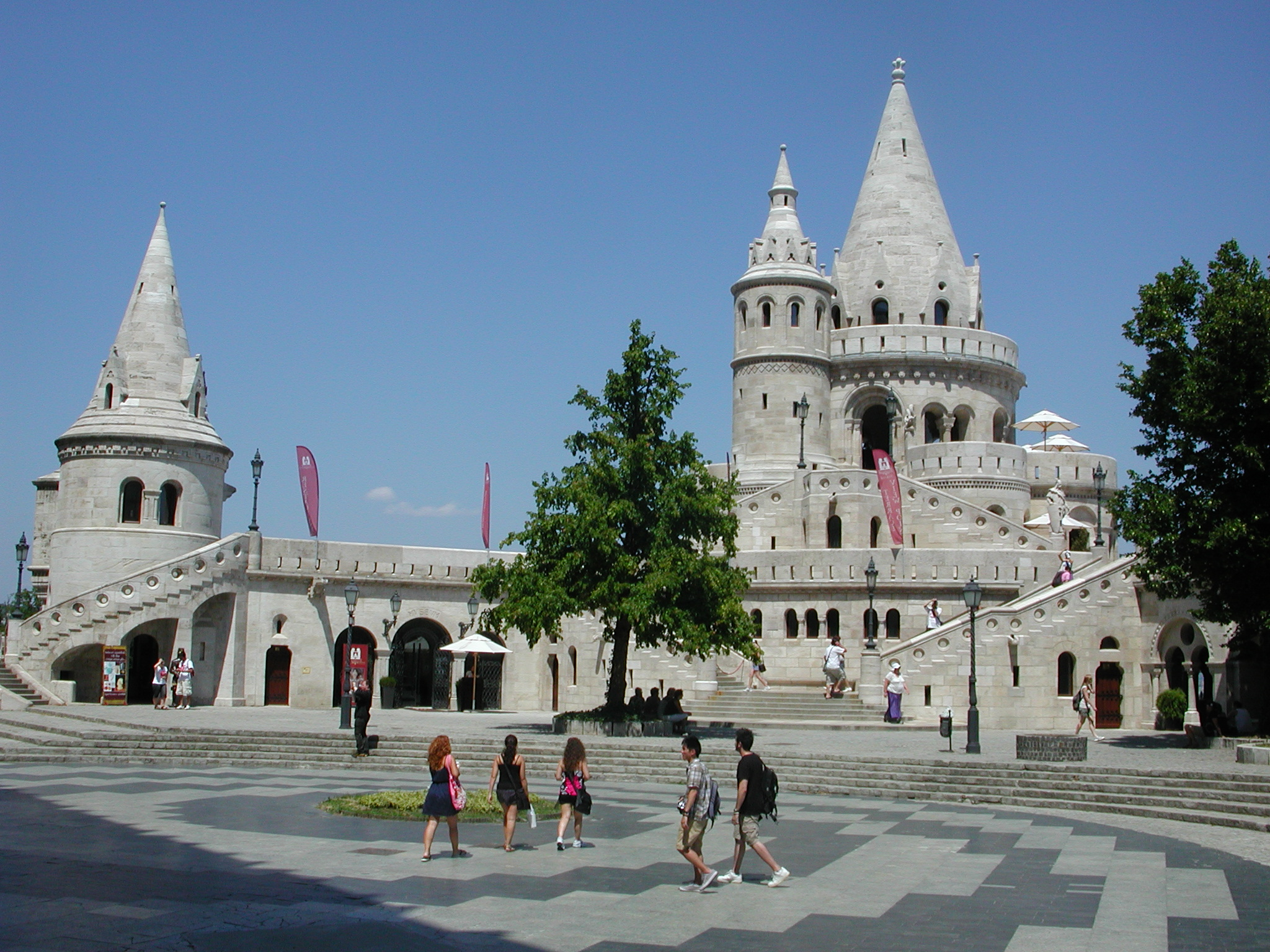
Buda Castle Quarter, Fisherman's Bastion

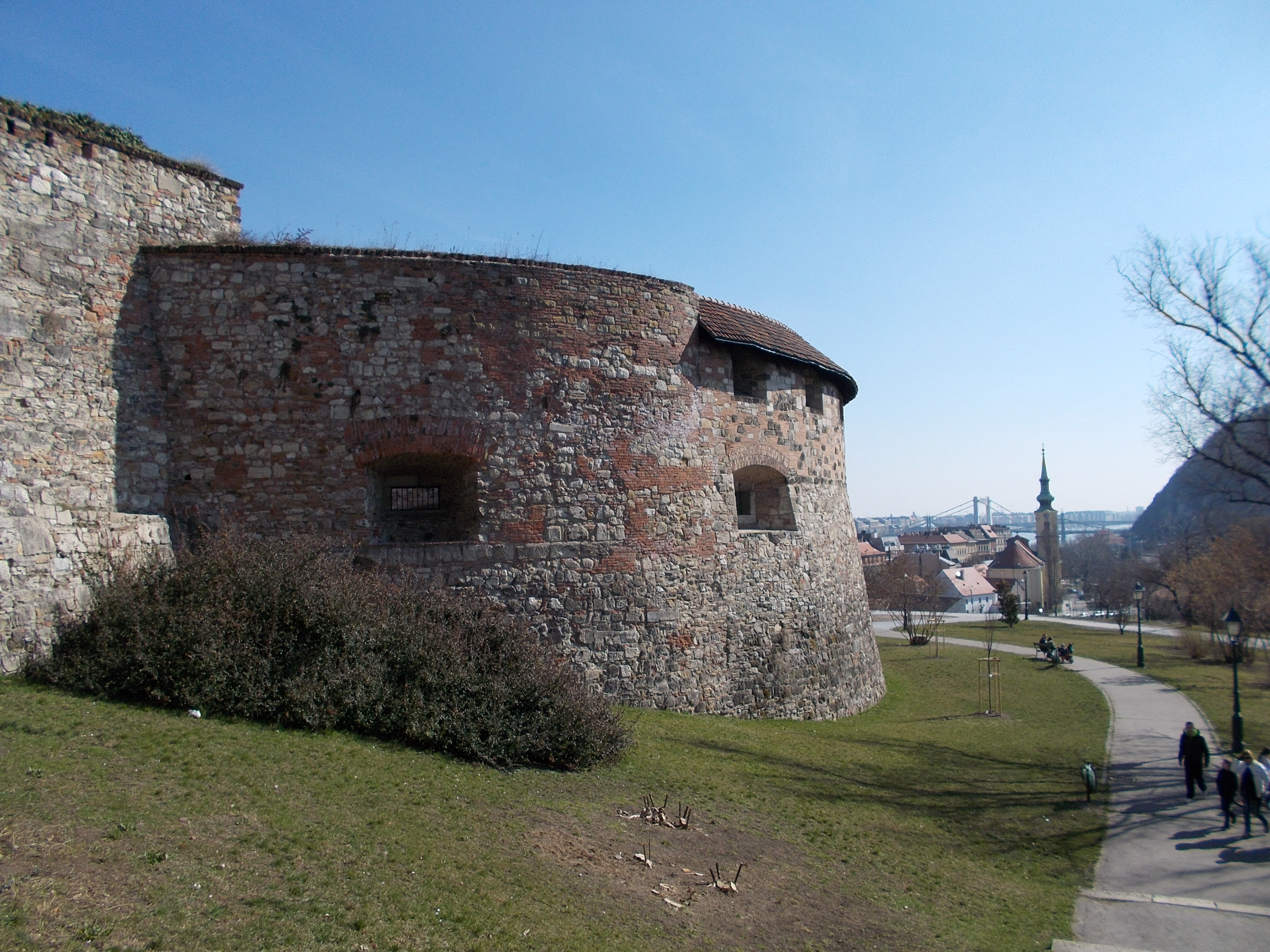
Southern Great Rondelle The Southern Great Rondelle from the Ferdinand Gate

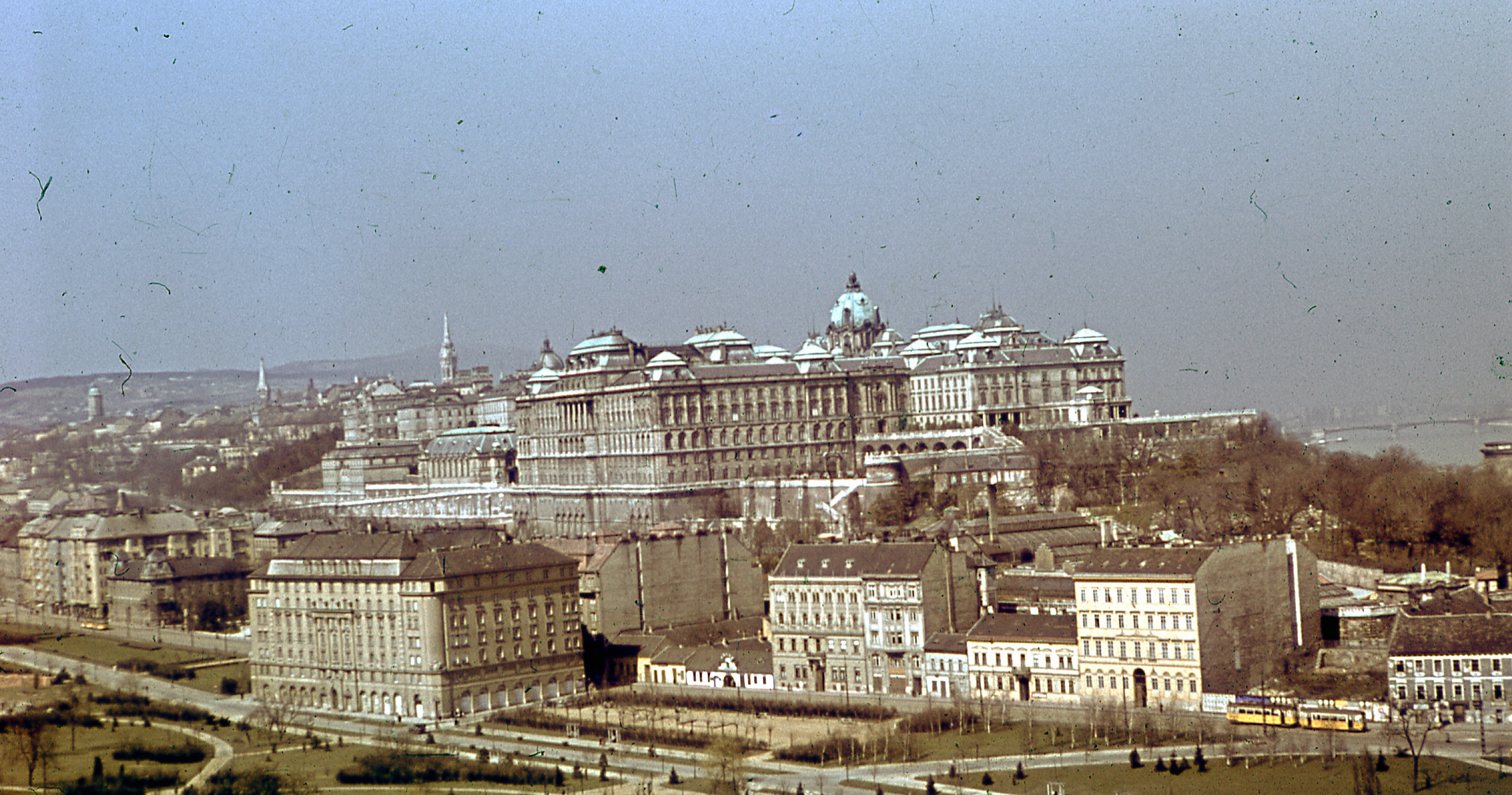
Royal Palace as seen from Gellert Hill, with Taban and Bethlen Court in the foreground.

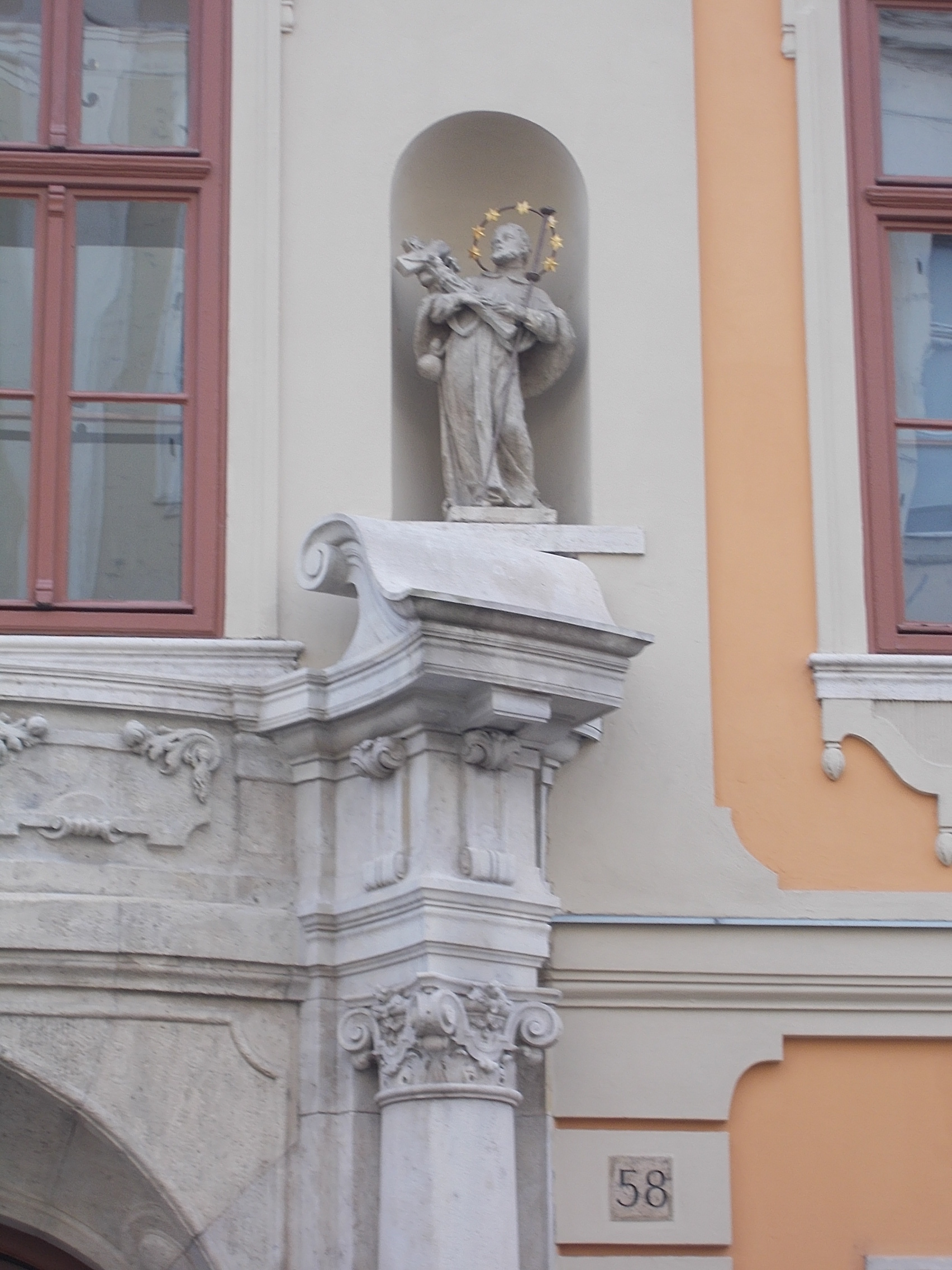
Sigray Palace, 1890s, Baroque. - #60 Uri Street, Várnegyed neighbourhood, Budapest District I.

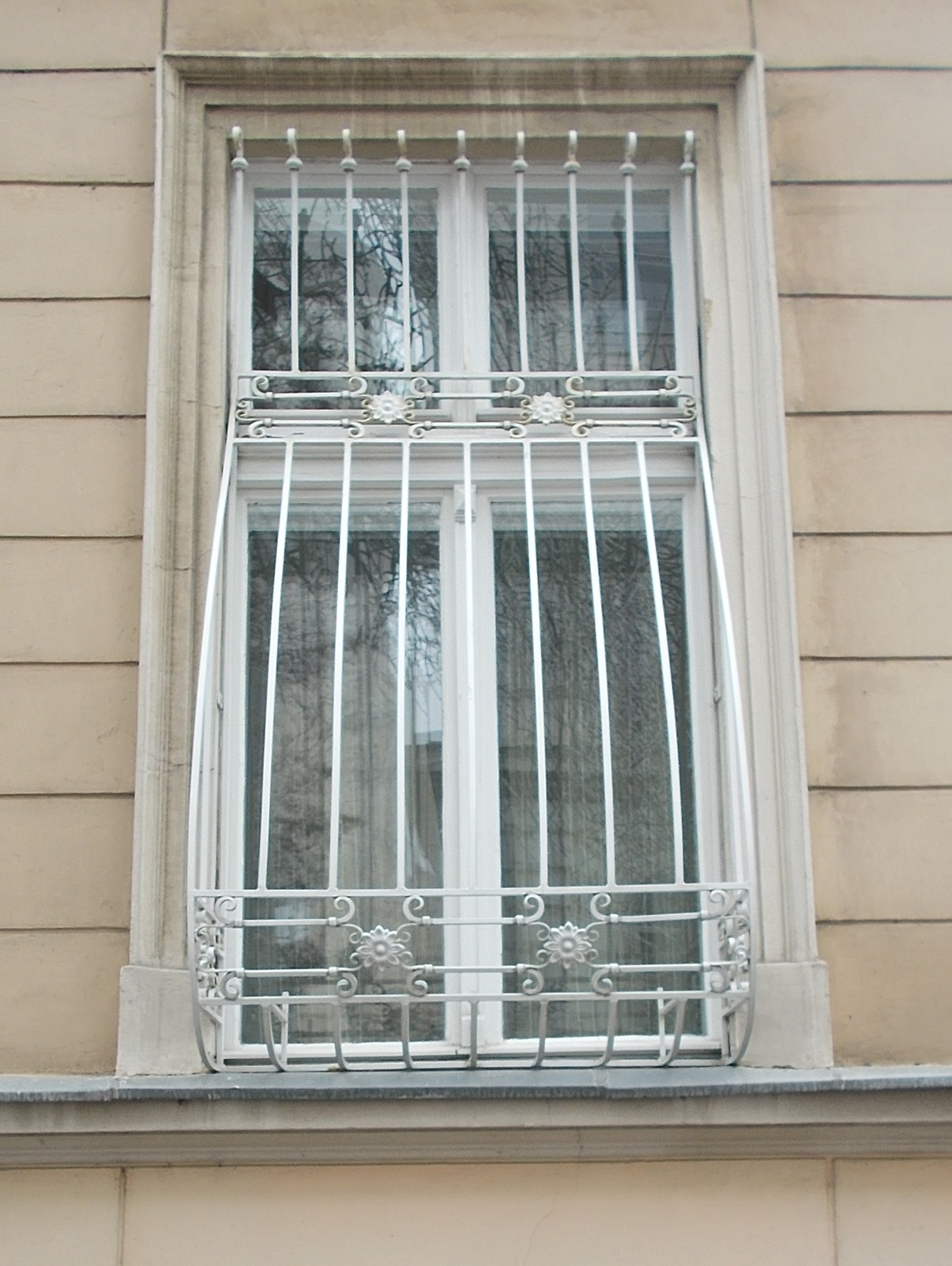
Schmelhegger house (1888). - 27 Országház street, Várnegyed neighborhood, Budapest District I

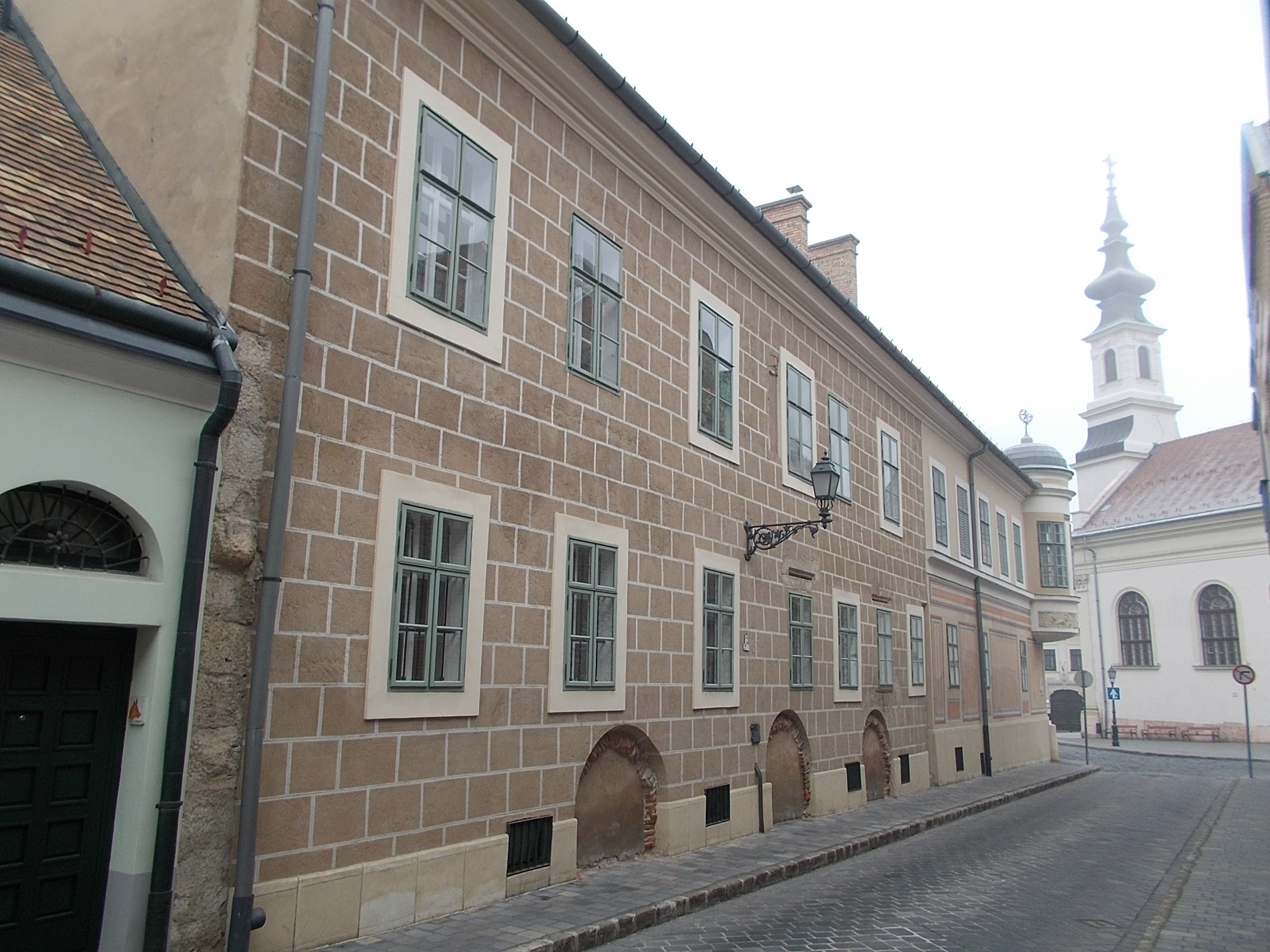
Esterhazy mansion and Lutheran Church. - 8 Bécsi kapu square, Várnegyed neighborhood, Budapest District I

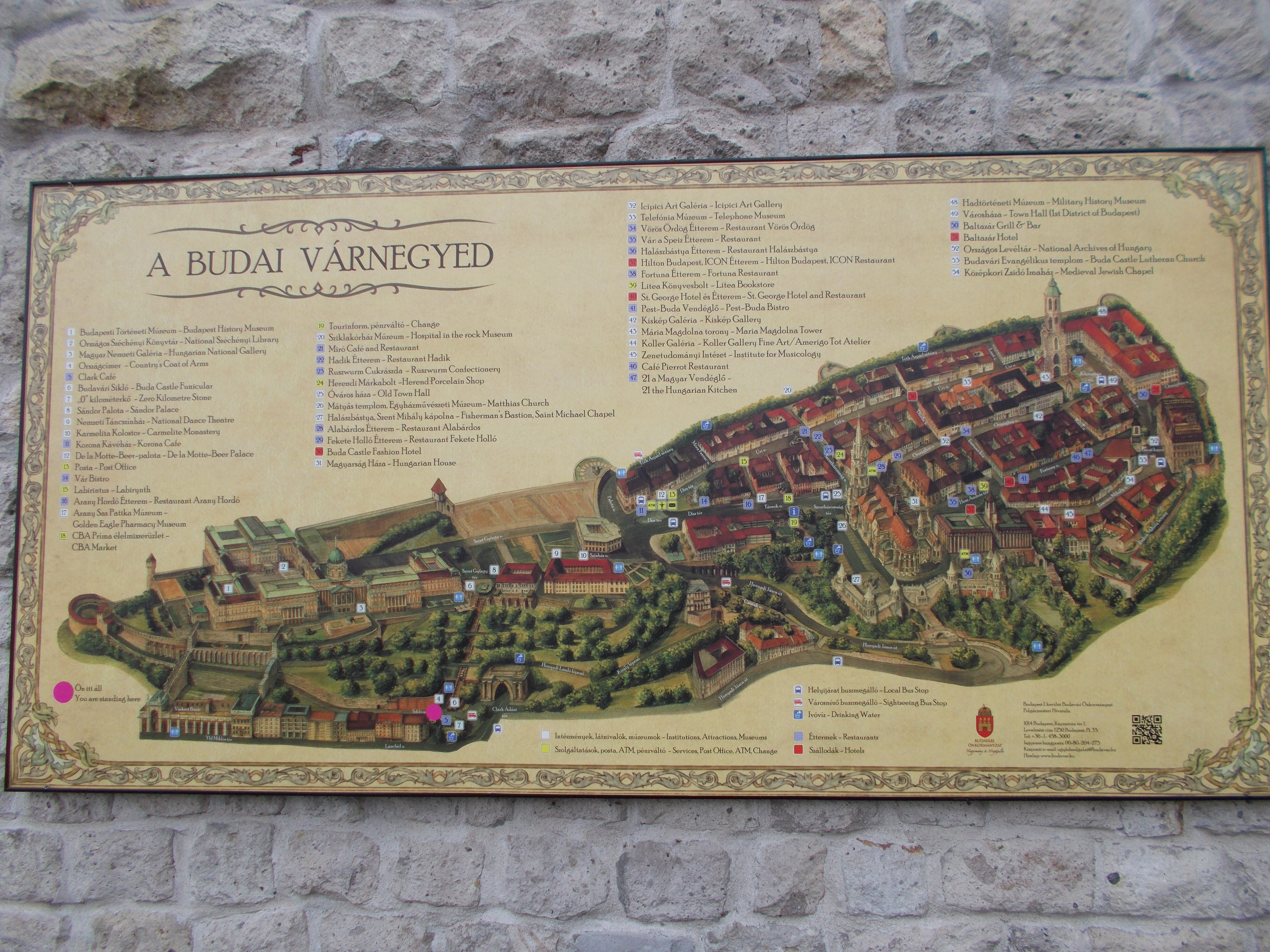
Map
