= Buda Hills =

Mountain range near Budapest, Hungary

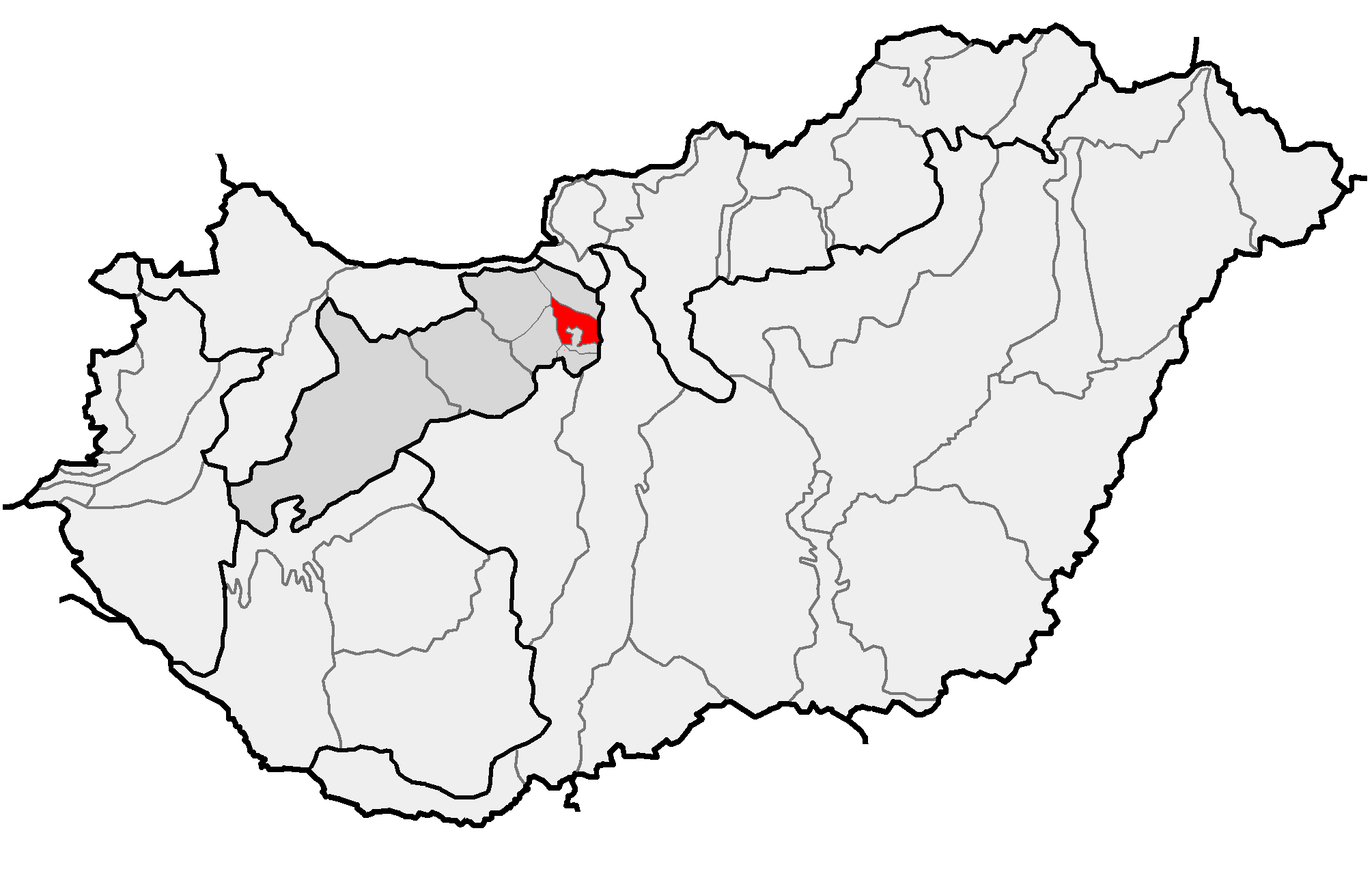
Location of the Buda Hills proper (Budai-hegyek) within physical subdivisions of Hungary. The Buda Hills in broader sense (Budai-hegység) include also southerly situated Budaörs and Budakeszi Basin (Budaörsi- és Budakeszi-medence) and Tétény Plateau (Tétényi-fennsík).

The Buda Hills (Hungarian: Budai-hegység) are a low mountain range of numerous hills which dot the Buda side of Budapest, capital of Hungary. The most famous ones located within city limits are Gellért Hill, Castle Hill, Rózsadomb, Sváb Hill, János Hill, Széchenyi Hill and Eagle Hill. These hills consist of both nature and residential areas.

== Geology ==
The Budaörs dolomite of Anisian-Carnian age (Triassic period) is the oldest formation which crops out in the Buda Hills. Younger Triassic succession is composed of cherty dolomite and limestone (basin facies), and dolomite combined with limestone (platform facies). The Triassic surface is composed of karstified carbonates, which are overlain by an Upper Eocene succession made of conglomerate beds.

During the period from the terminal Cretaceous to Priabonian, the area was a karstic terrestrial environment displaying distinct relief differences. It was also the time when Triassic formations were eroded. The continental period (ended by the transgression in Late Eocene) was characterized by the formation of small fans at the slope foot. The fans contained substantial quantities of andesite clasts thanks to the fans' close location to the andesite source rocks. The clasts could have been then transported by periodic streams along the valleys. The Late Eocene transgression reworked accumulated terrestrial sediments.

== Important hills ==
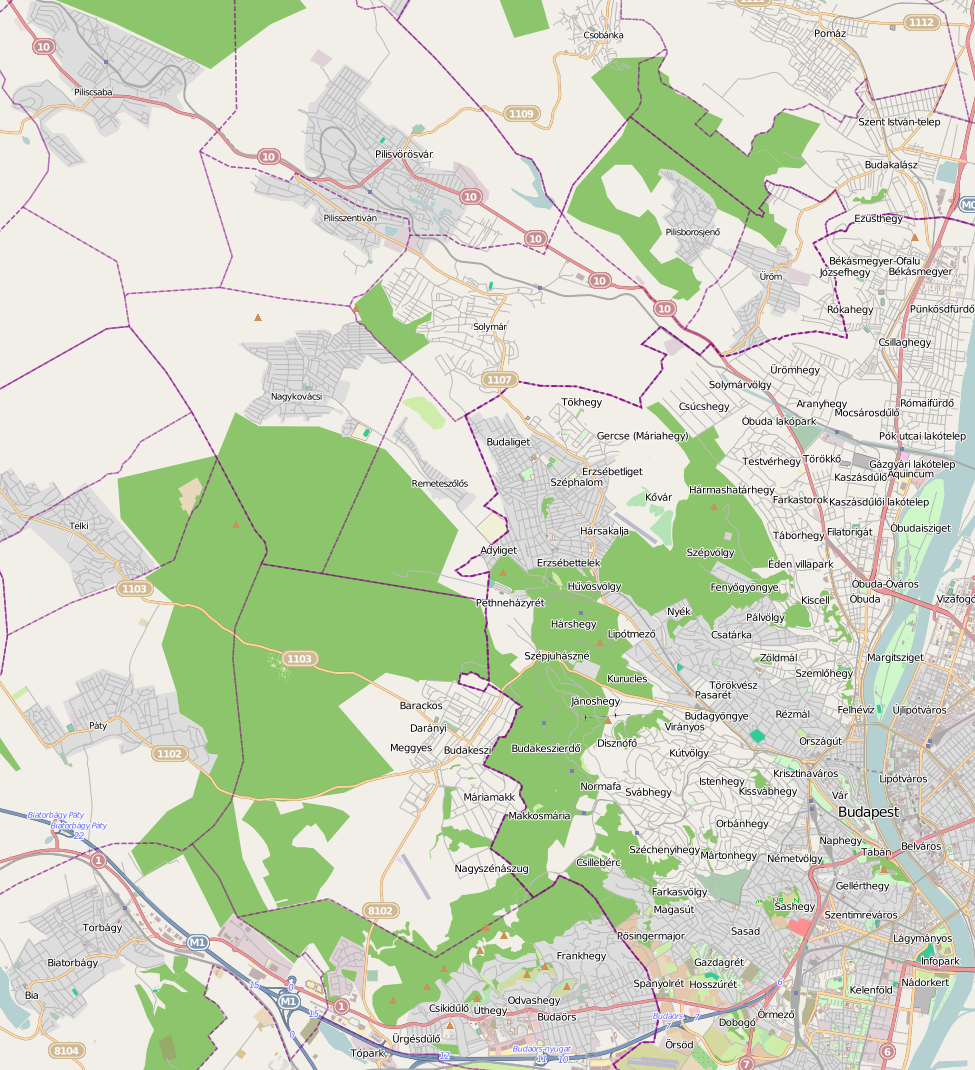
Map of the Buda Hills

The most important hills of the region are:

- Budaörsi Hill
- Ferenc Hill
- János Hill
- Kutya Hill
- Nagy-Kopasz
- Nagy-Szénás
- Remete Hill
- Szabadság Hill
- Széchenyi Hill
- Zsíros Hill

== Gallery ==
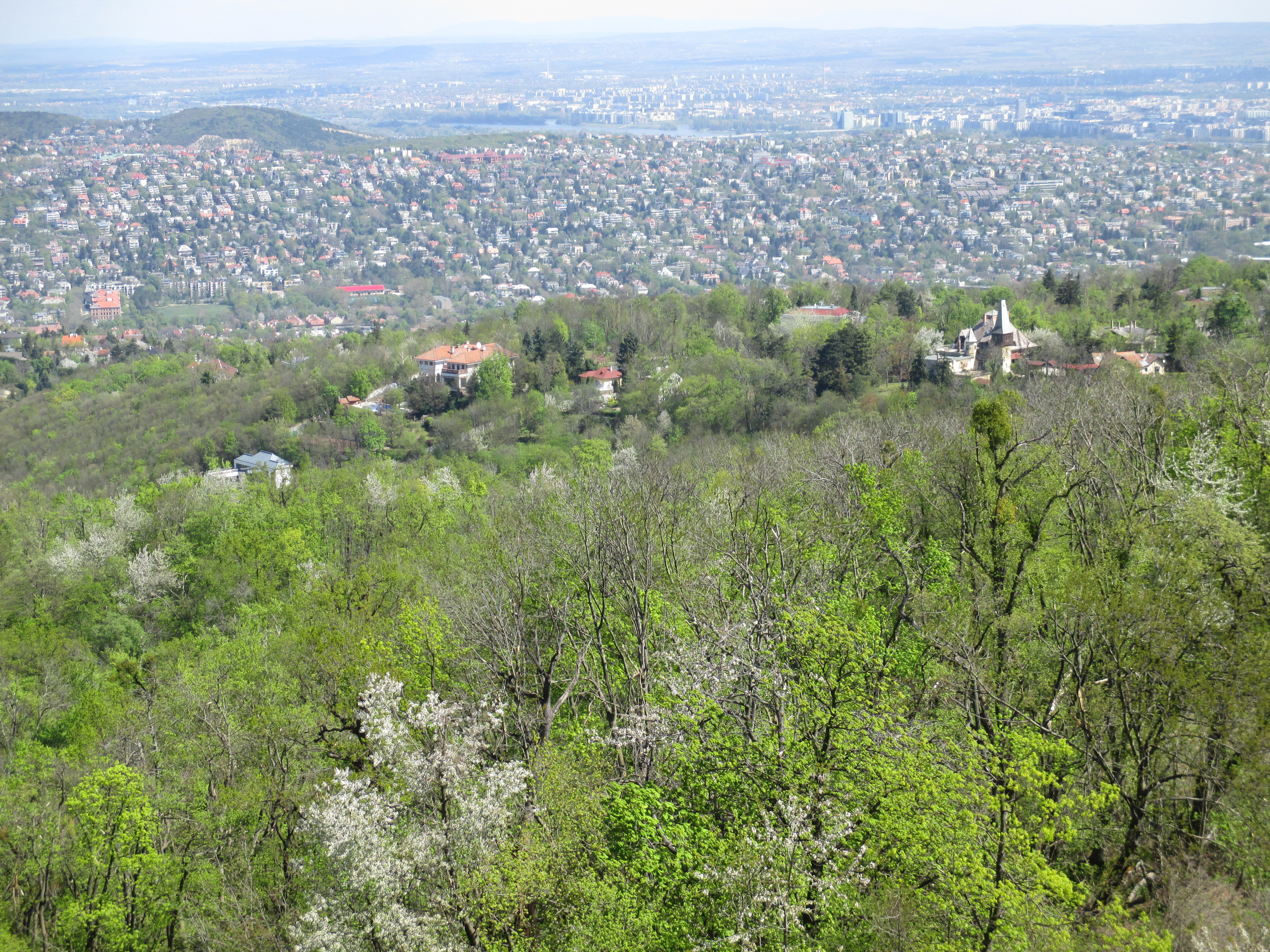
A view of the hills

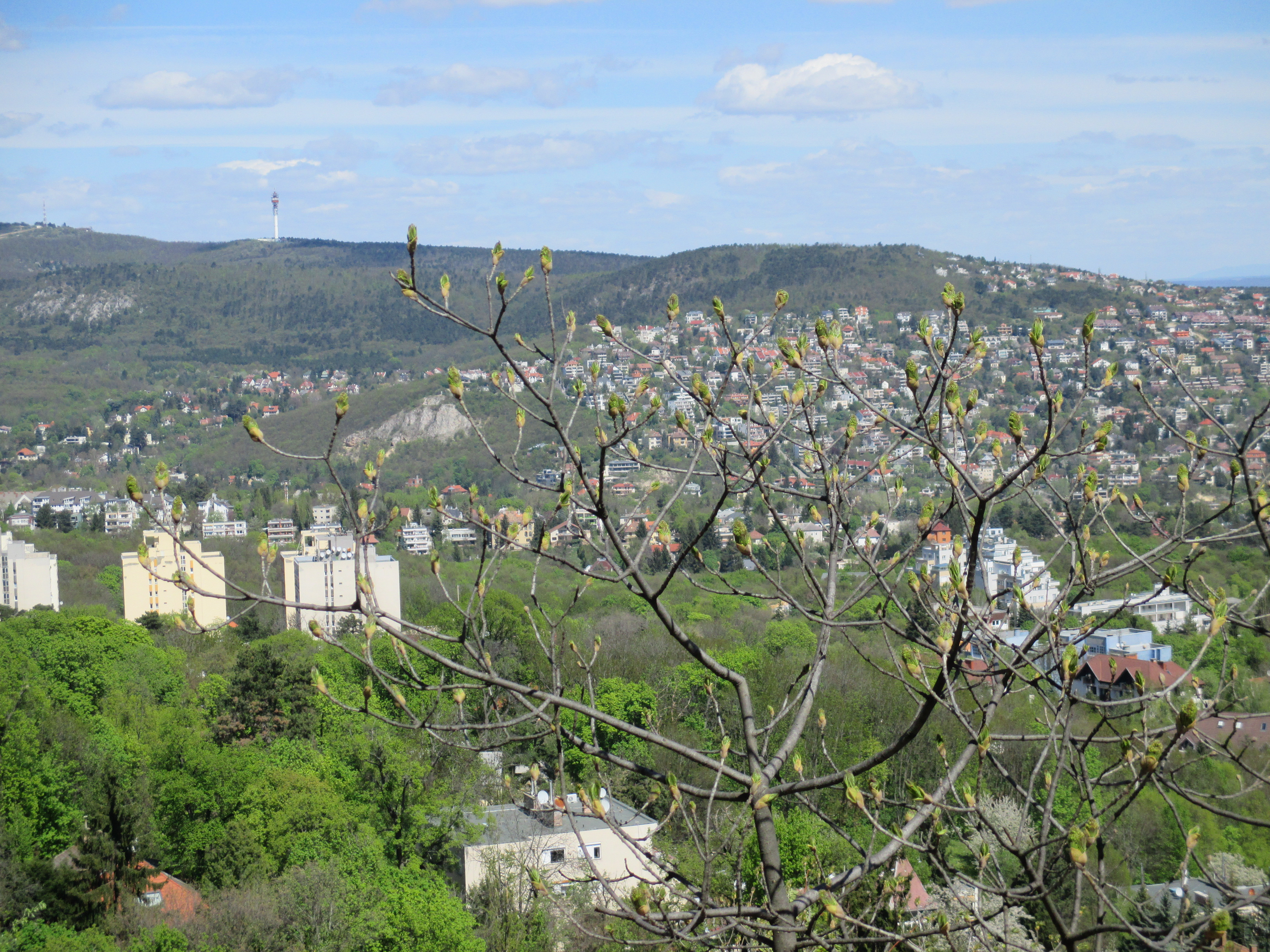
Another view

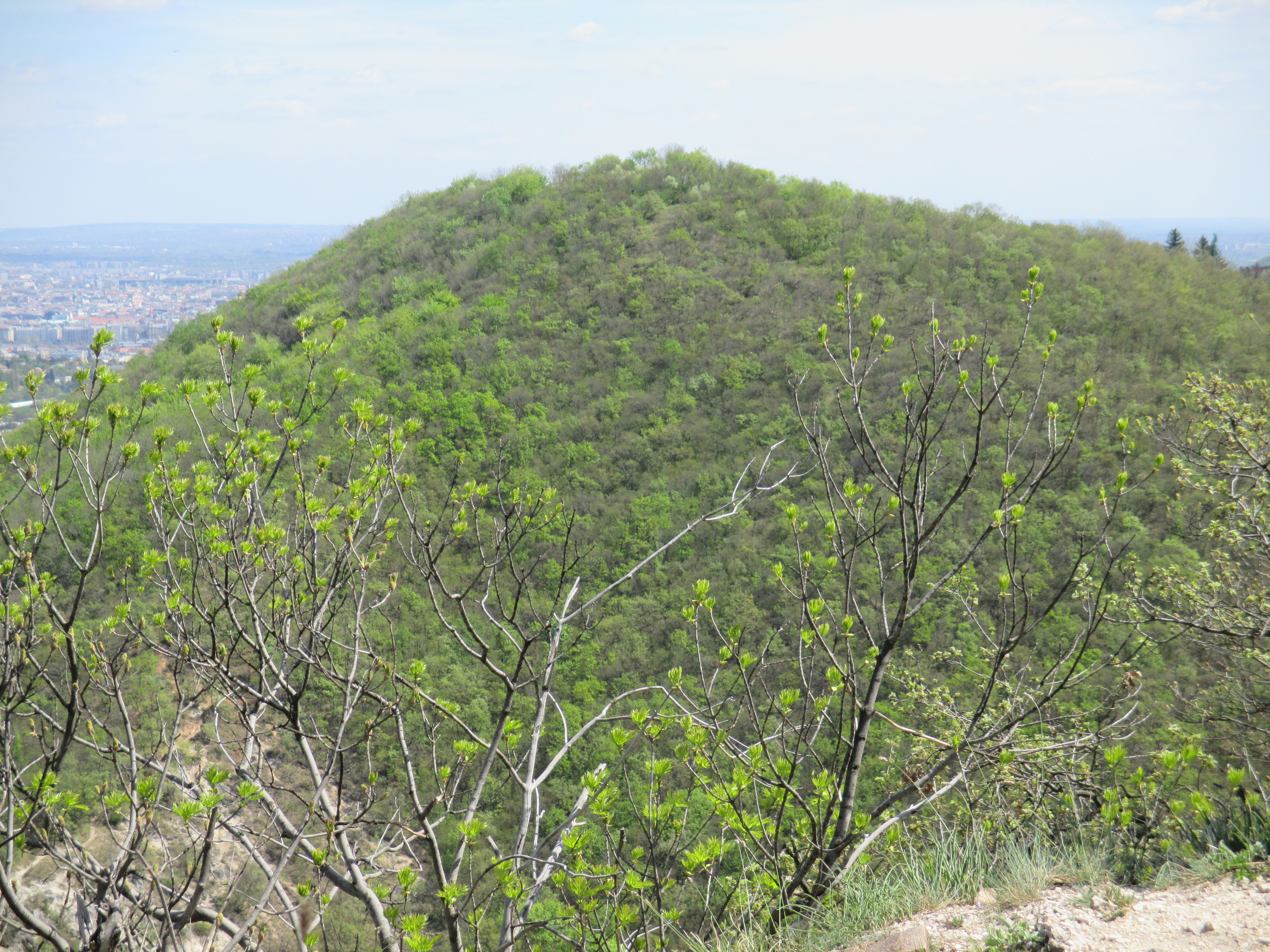
Hunyad-orom

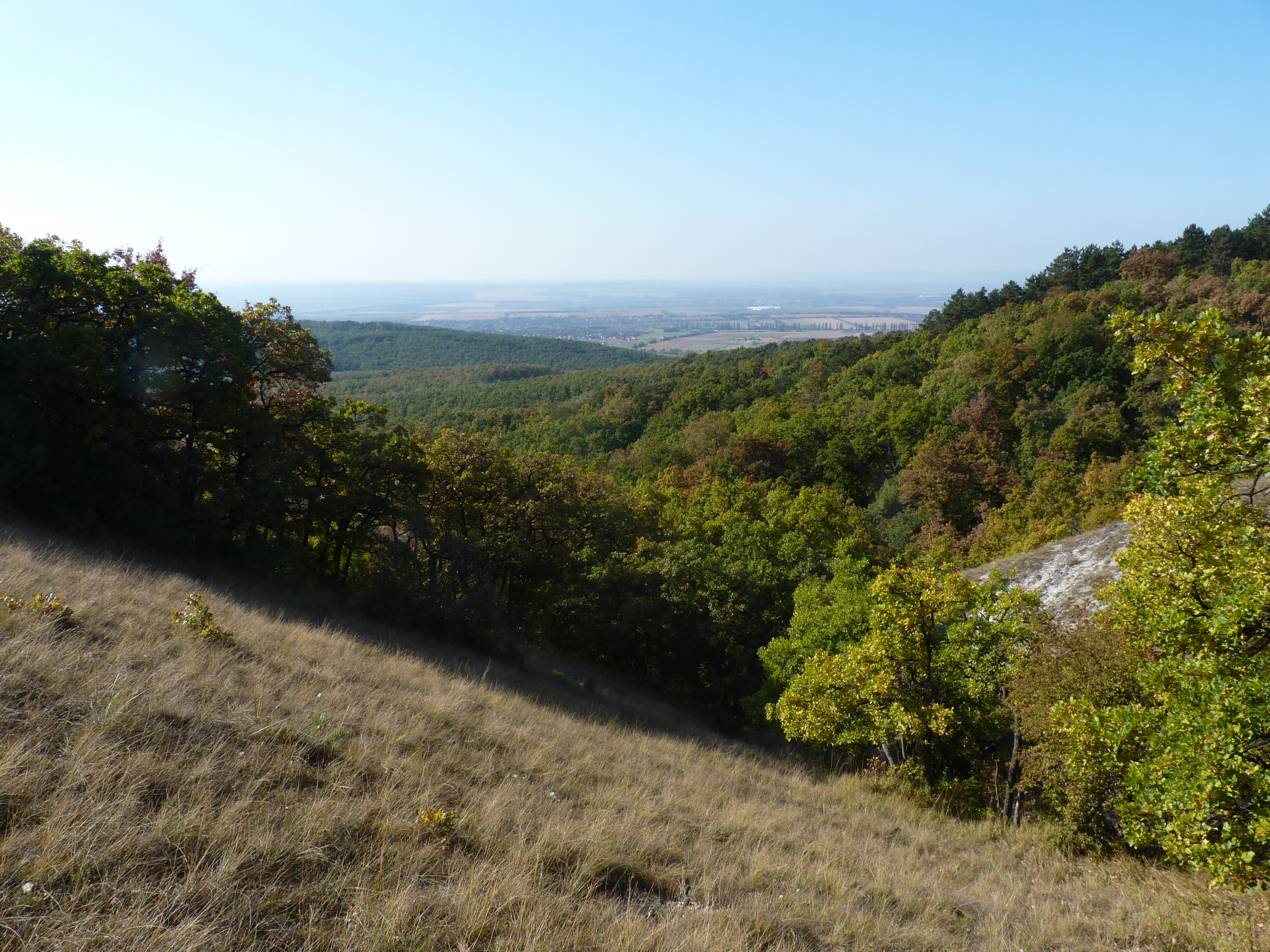
A slope from the hills

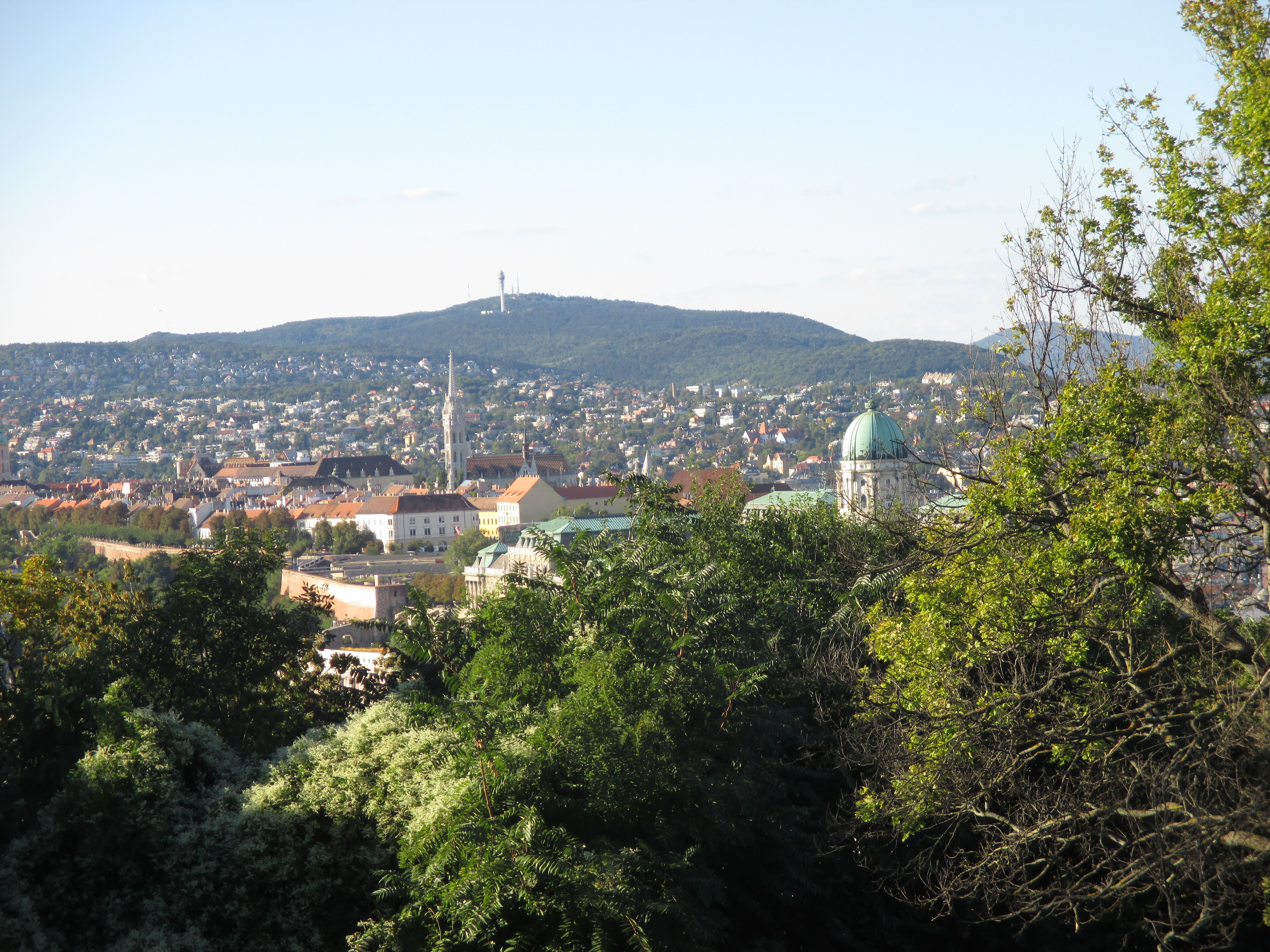
A view from Gellért Hill
