= Abdurrahman Abdi Pasha (court historian) =

- Born: 1630; Ottoman Empire
- Died: March 1692; Ottoman Empire
- Occupation(s): Historian, Ottoman official

Academic background
- Influences: Attar of Nishapur, 'Orfi Shirazi

Academic work
- Era: Ottoman Empire
- Discipline: History, Poetry
- Notable works: Tarikh-e Neshanji Abdurrahman Pasha

Abdurrahman Abdi Pasha (Note: Also spelled "Abd al-Rahman".) ("Abdi" was his pen name; born 1630 – died March 1692), was an Ottoman official and historian. He served as kubbe veziri and as governor of several provinces, and functioned as the official court historian (vakanüvis) of Mehmed IV (r. 1648–1687). Abdurrahman Abdi wrote an account of events covering 1648–1682, known as the Tarikh-e Neshanji Abdurrahman Pasha. Aburrahman Abdi also wrote poetry and was the author of commentaries on Attar of Nishapur's Pandnameh and on the poems of 'Orfi Shirazi.

== Sources ==
- Ágoston, Gábor; Masters, Bruce (2009). Encyclopedia of the Ottoman Empire. Facts on File, Inc. p. 154. ISBN 978-1438110257.
- Babinger, Fr. (1960). "ʿAbdī Pas̲h̲a". In Gibb, H. A. R.; Kramers, J. H.; Lévi-Provençal, E.; Schacht, J.; Lewis, B. & Pellat, Ch. (eds.). The Encyclopaedia of Islam, Second Edition. Volume I: A–B. Leiden: E. J. Brill. p. 97. OCLC 495469456.
- Dianat, Ali Akbar; Lahouti, Hassan. "ʿAbdī Pāshā (Abdi Paşa) (1)". In Madelung, Wilferd; Daftary, Farhad (eds.). Encyclopaedia Islamica Online. Brill Online. ISSN 1875-9831.
- Hathaway, Jane (2018). The Chief Eunuch of the Ottoman Harem: From African Slave to Power-Broker. Cambridge University Press. pp. 101, 109. ISBN 978-1108572330.
- Sisman, Cengiz (2017). The Burden of Silence: Sabbatai Sevi and the Evolution of the Ottoman-Turkish Dönmes. Oxford University Press. p. 45. ISBN 978-0190698560.
- Yazici, T. (1982). "ʿABDĪ". Encyclopaedia Iranica, Vol. I, Fasc. 2. p. 208.
