= Lutheran Church of Budavár =

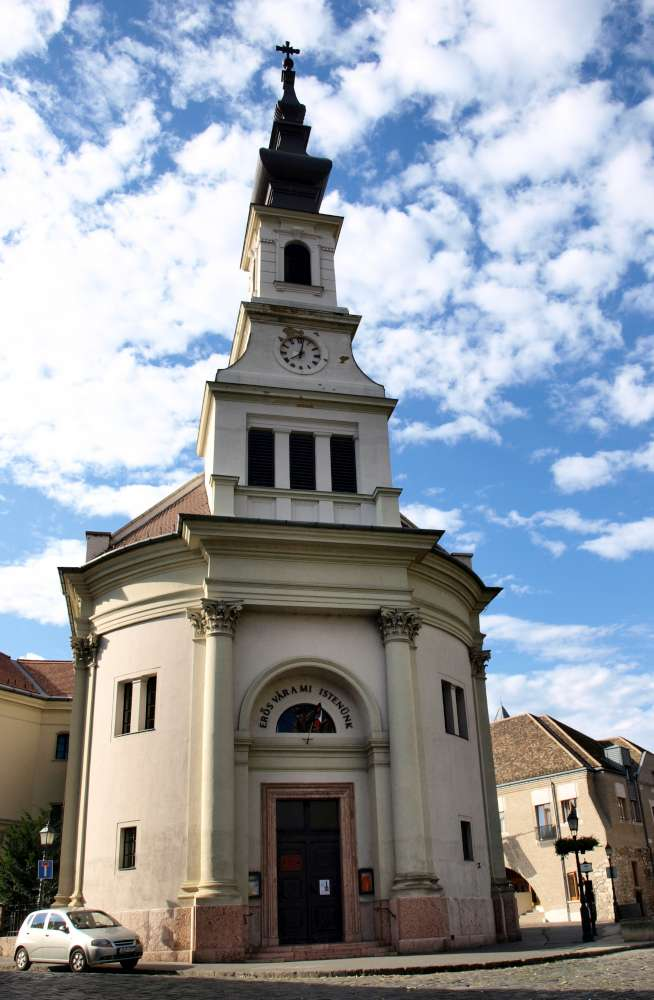
- Lutheran Church of Budavár
- 47°30′17″N 19°01′51″E
- Denomination: Lutheram

History
- Founded: 1895

Architecture
- Style: Baroque Revival architecture

Administration
- Diocese: Diocese of Buda
- Parish: Lutheran Parish of Budavár

Lutheran Church of Budavár is the oldest Lutheran church of Buda. It was built in 1895 at Vienna Gate Square in the 1st District of Budapest. The first church for the Lutherans of Buda was built by Maria Dorothea, third wife of Palatine Joseph, in 1846, at hu:Dísz tér. The site was taken over by the Ministry of Defence, so a new church was built near Vienna Gate.

== Background ==
The building was designed by Mór Kallina and it was consecrated in 1895 by Sámuel Sárkány, bishop of the Lutheran diocese of Bánya. It has eclectic neobaroque style with a neobaroque façade. Its entrance is surrounded by two Corinthian order-like columns with shoulders. It has a tall, slim square tower whose steeple is again neobaroque in style. There is a double loft over the entrance.

Most of the church was destroyed by a bomb detonation during the Siege of Budapest in 1945. Only the outer walls escaped destruction. The altar, the benches and the organ were all lost. Plans for reconstruction were made by Lóránt Friedrich and Jr Gyula Bretz. The new church was sanctified by Lajos Ordas bishop on Palm Sunday, 1948. While the exterior retained its neobaroque flavour in a simplified form, the interior became much austere. There is a huge cross behind the wooden altar table and a mosaic window over it admitting some light within. There is a red marble baptismal font at the altar and a bronze tablet about vicar Gábor Sztehlo.

This church today is the centre of liturgical life for the Lutheran Diocese of Budavár. There are several services every Sunday and on holidays. Flats and offices for the vicars, rooms for the congregation and the centre for the German-speaking Lutheran Diocese of Budavár adjoin the church. Since 1952, it has also been the centre of the Northern Lutheran See. Several bishops were ordained here.

The tower and the paved area in front of the church were renovated in 2008.

Pulpit

The church has no pulpit because the original one was destroyed in 1945 together with all the other pieces of furniture. This pulpit was a precious relic from the first church on Dísz tér because its upper part was transferred here from the demolished building. The plans of Mór Kallina, dated 1894, show a monumental altar-pulpit in line with the Central-European Lutheran tradition. These interior plans were only partially executed and the pulpit was built instead as a separate structure on the left side of the apse. The access was from the sacristy through a steep stairway. The hexagonal wooden balcony was supported by a huge hexagonal pillar. The surface imitated marble veneer with gilt decorations.

The relief on the middle panel depicted The Sower as a Hungarian peasant among trees and fields. The other four panels were decorated with Christian symbols including the scriptures, cross, torches, and a laurel wreath. On the underside of the abat-voix there was the Eye of Providence between rays of light. The hexagonal canopy was crowned with the Tablets of Stone set on silvery clouds and framed with gilt palm and laurel branches.
