= Budapest Castle Hill Funicular =

Historical funicular railway in Hungary

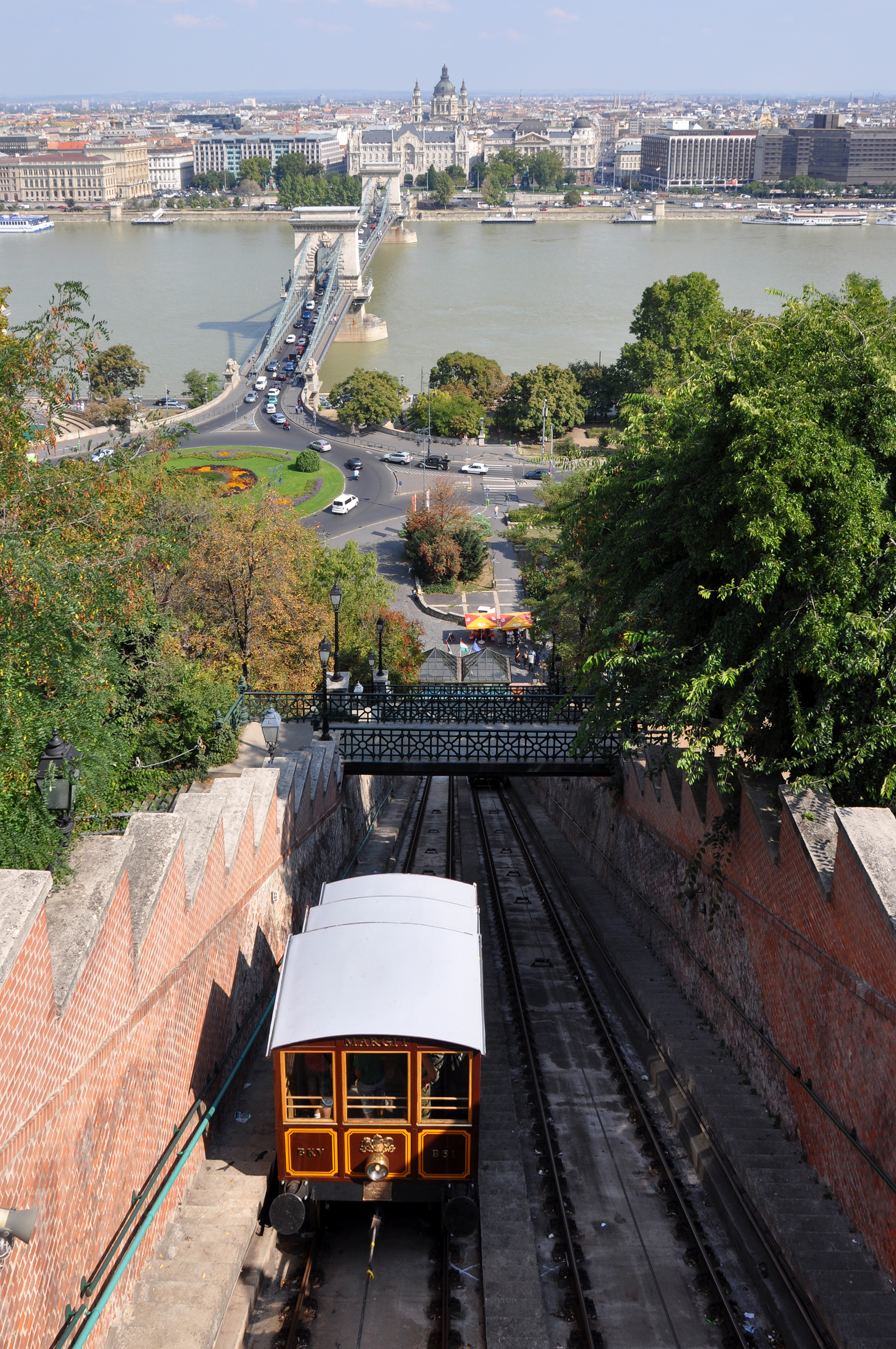
- The Budapest funicular, with Car BS1 "Margit" in the foreground and the Széchenyi Chain Bridge in the background in September 2009

Overview
- Status: in use
- Locale: Budapest
- Coordinates: 47°29′52″N 19°2′21″E

Service
- Type: Funicular
- Operator(s): BKV (Mass Transport Company of Budapest)

History
- Opened: 2 March 1870

Technical
- Line length: 0.095 km (0.059 mi)
- Number of tracks: Double track
- Track gauge: 1,435 mm (4 ft 8 1/2 in) standard gauge
- Operating speed: 5.4 km/h (3.4 mph)
- Maximum incline: 31.75°

The Budapest Castle Hill Funicular or Budavári Sikló is a funicular railway in the city of Budapest, in Hungary. It links the Adam Clark Square and the Széchenyi Chain Bridge at river level to Buda Castle above.

The line was opened on March 2, 1870, and has been in municipal ownership since 1920. It was destroyed in the Second World War and reopened on June 4, 1986. A feature of the line are the two pedestrian foot bridges which cross above it. These were present when the line opened, were removed in 1900 when the castle's garden was extended, and rebuilt to the original design in 1983.

== History ==
The building of the line started in July 1868, the first test run was on 23 October 1869. The Sikló has operated for the public since 2 March 1870. This funicular rail was the second in Europe, only Lyon had a similar transportation system at that time.

During the Second World War the cars and the terminals were destroyed by bombs.

The remnants of the funicular were then dismantled. Replacement with escalators was considered later. Reconstruction of the funicular was decided in 1965, and several plans were made, but the construction works were delayed. Several museums have moved to the Castle in 1975 and because of this, a midibus service between the two termini (line "V") was launched in 1975. This was in operation until the line was finally reopened in 1986.

== Technical parameters ==
The line has the following technical parameters:

- Length: 95 m (312 ft)
- Height: 51 m (167 ft)
- gradient: 31.75° (62%)
- Cars: 2
- Capacity: 24 passengers per car
- Configuration: Double track
- Maximum speed: 1.5 m/s (3.4 mph; 5.4 km/h)
- Track gauge: 1,435 mm (4 ft 8 1/2 in) standard gauge
- Traction: Electricity
- Trip time: 1 minute 30 seconds

== Operation ==
The line is operated by the BKV (Mass Transport Company of Budapest), and operates from 07.30 to 22.00 each day. It is subject to special fare.

== Gallery ==
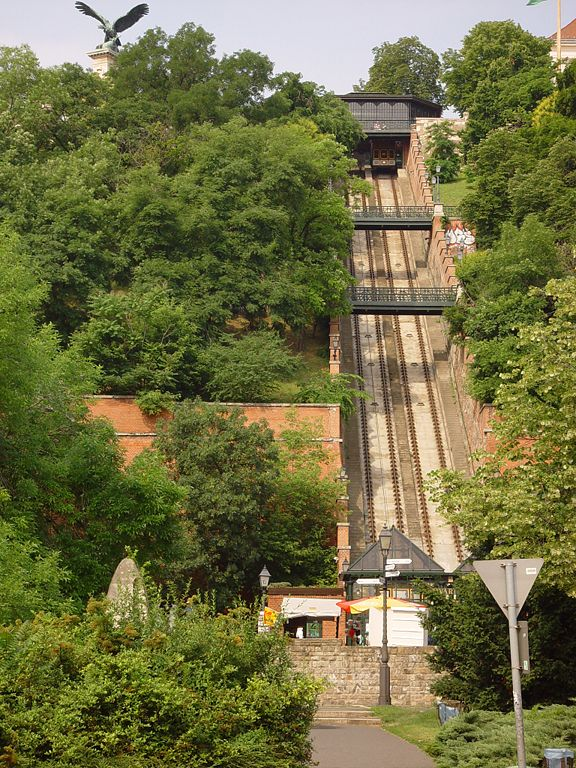
Looking up the line, showing the distinctive foot bridges in June 2005

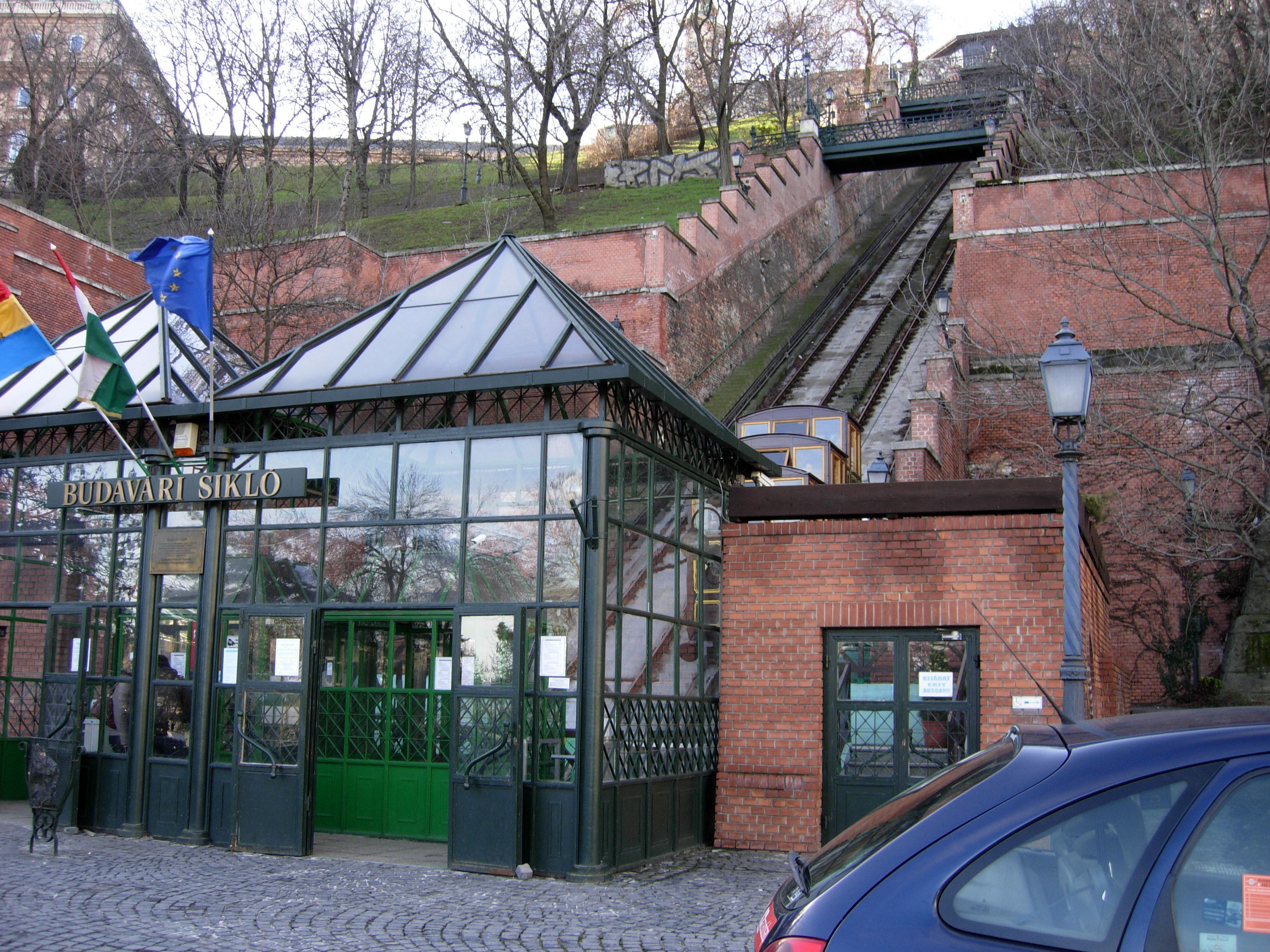
View from the front of the funicular in January 2008

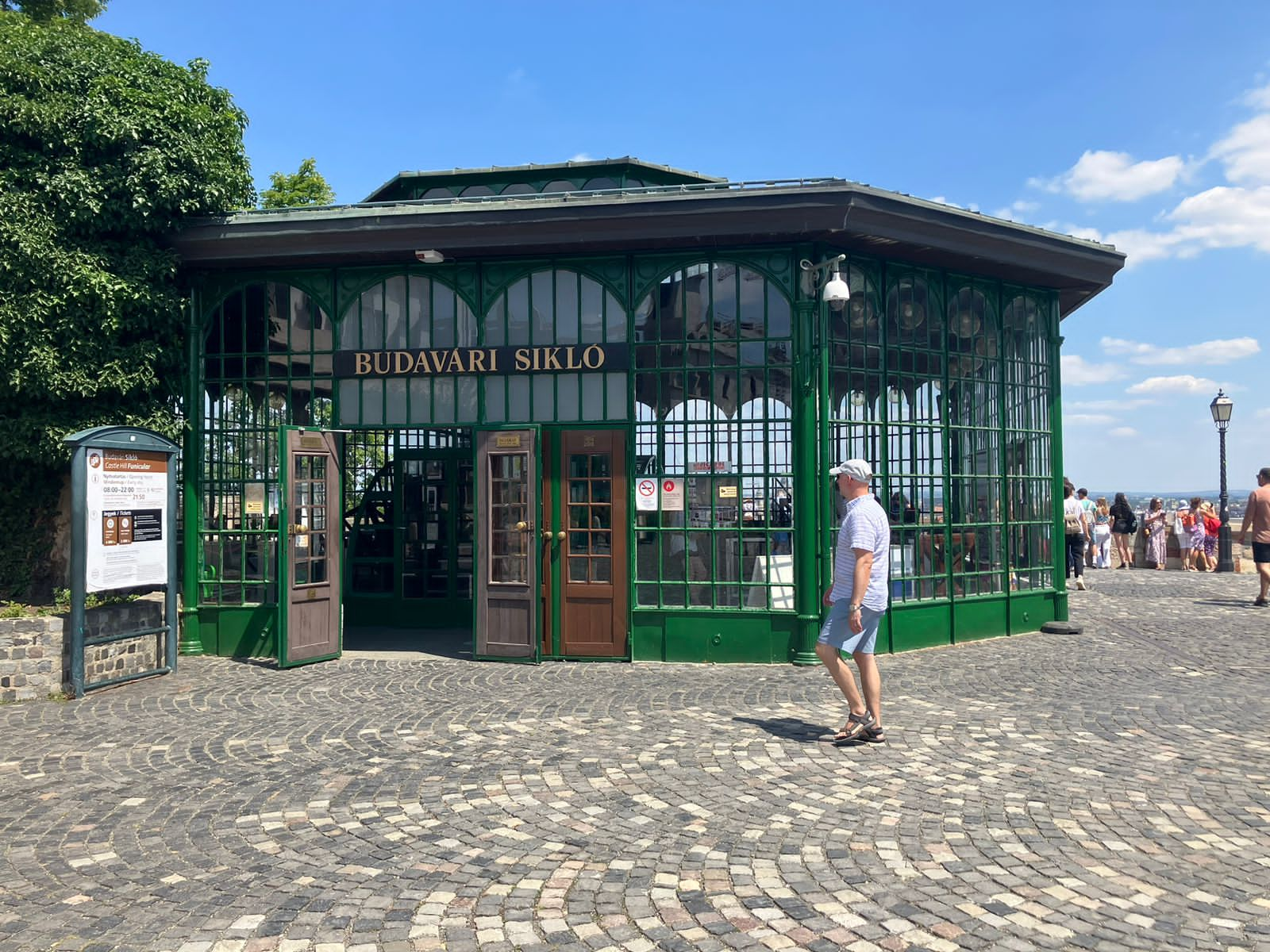
Budavári Sikló is a funicular railway station, at river level, that connects to Buda castle. July 2023

== See also ==
- List of funicular railways
