= Vienna Gate =

Gateway in Budapest, Hungary

- Bécsi kapu
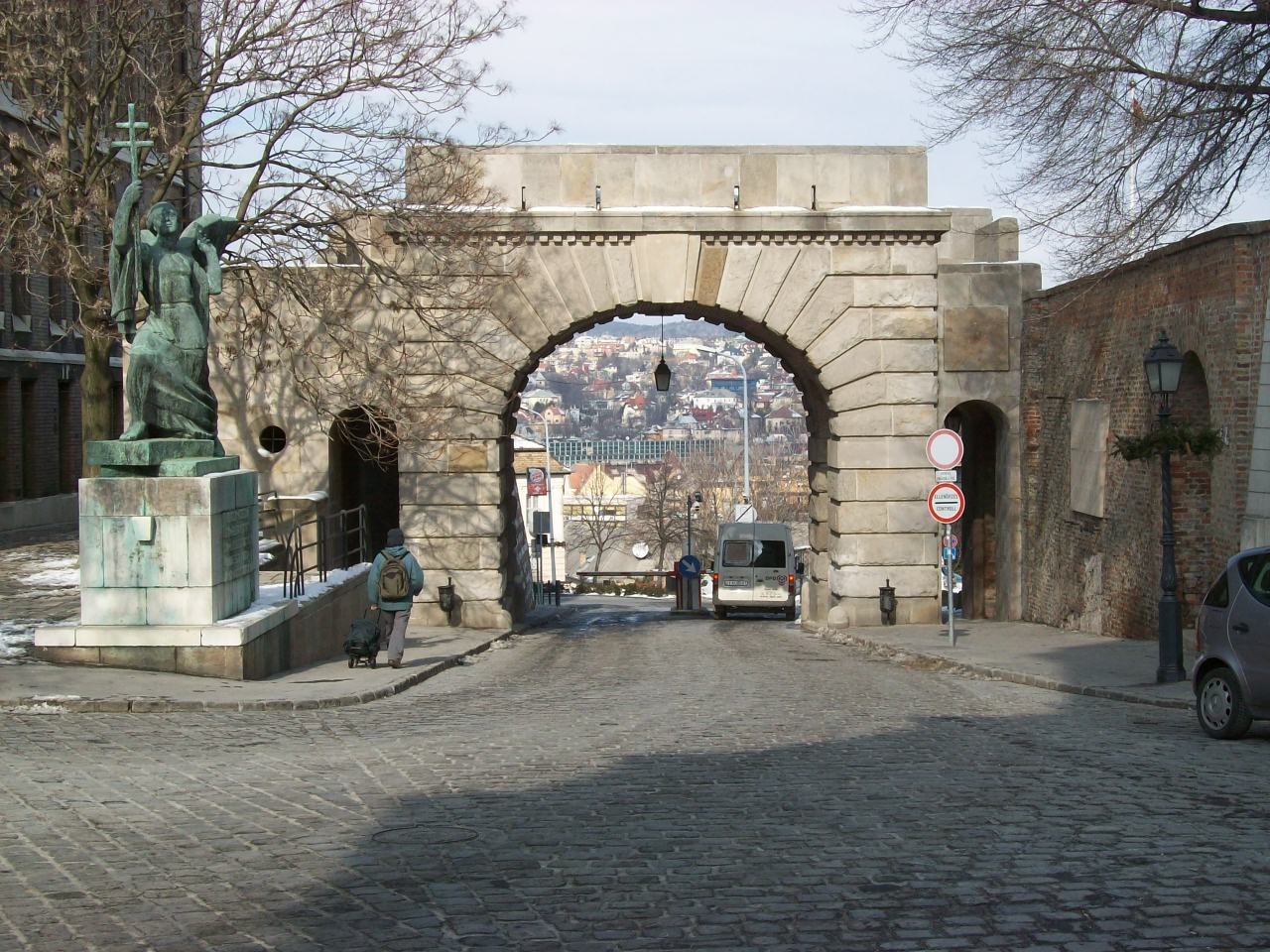
- Bécsi kapu from the Lutheran Church of Budavár

- Location within Hungary

General information
- Type: Gateway
- Location: Budapest, Hungary
- Coordinates: 47°30′18″N 19°1′50″E

The Vienna Gate (Hungarian:Bécsi kapu (IPA ['be:tʃɪ 'kɔpʊ]); in English German: Wiener Tor) is located at the Vienna Gate Square, Buda Castle, in 1st District, Budapest, Hungary. As the name suggests, it was the port connecting the Castle with the highway to Vienna.

== History ==
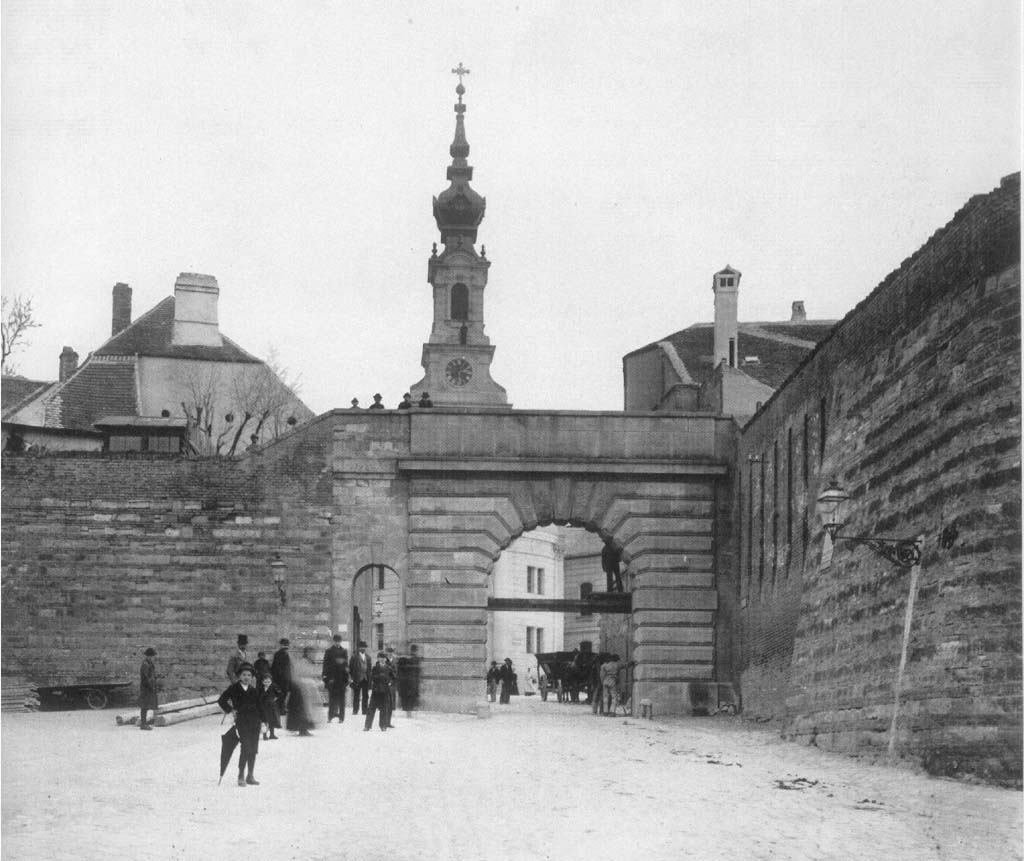
The old Bécsi kapu in 1896

During the Middle Ages, it was called Szombat-kapu (Saturday Gate), because markets were held in front of it every Saturday. It has been called Beç kapusu by the Ottomans. Later it became Zsidó-kapu (Jewish Gate). One of its two side-gates were removed in the early 19th century, and in 1896, the whole gate was demolished. The current gate was restored in 1936, commemorating the 250th anniversary of Recapturing of Buda.

The rebuilt gate, designed by Jenő Kismarty-Lechner, has a more symbolical, rather than functional value. Inscriptions, ornaments and reliefs, including a running angel was sculpted by Béla Ohmann. Two parts of Bastion Promenade are connected on the top of the gate. There are automatic barriers at the gate to mitigate transport in the Castle.
