= Ernő Foerk =

Hungarian architect (1868–1934)

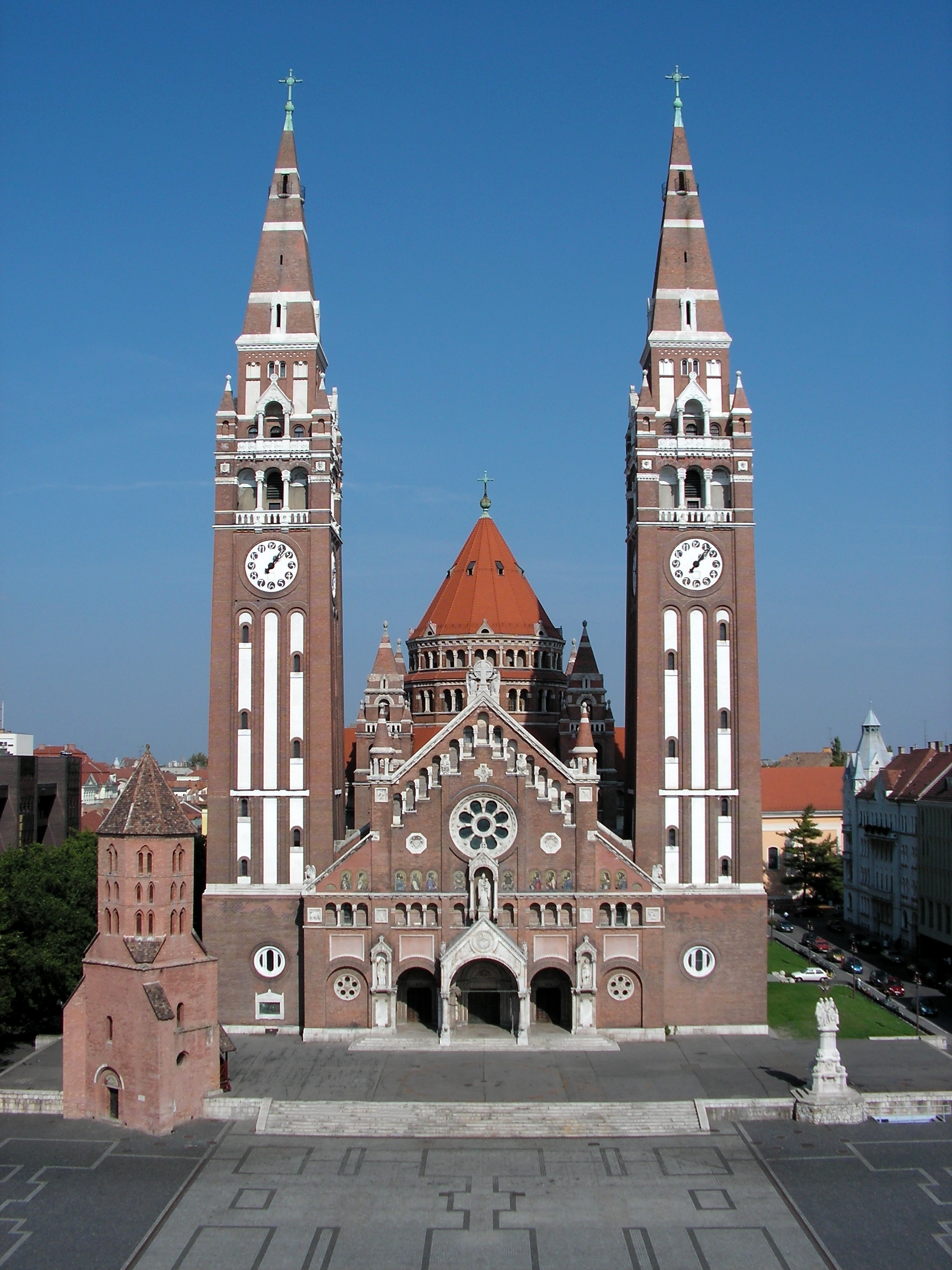
Votive Church of Szeged, designed by Ernő Foerk and Frigyes Schulek

Ernő Foerk (3 February 1868, Temesvár – 26 January 1934, Budapest) was a Hungarian architect.

== Life ==
Foerk originally began as a sculptor, but subsequently finished as a master builder. He studied at the Vienna Academy of Fine Arts, where he familiarised himself with the North Italian style, and this was the origin of his interest in Lombardian brick architecture. From 1891, he was assistant to Imre Steindl at the Technical University. He taught at the Hungarian School of Applied Arts from 1898 and became its director in 1920. He retired in 1929.
