= Elizabeth Lookout =

Building in Budapest, Hungary

- Erzsébet-kilátó
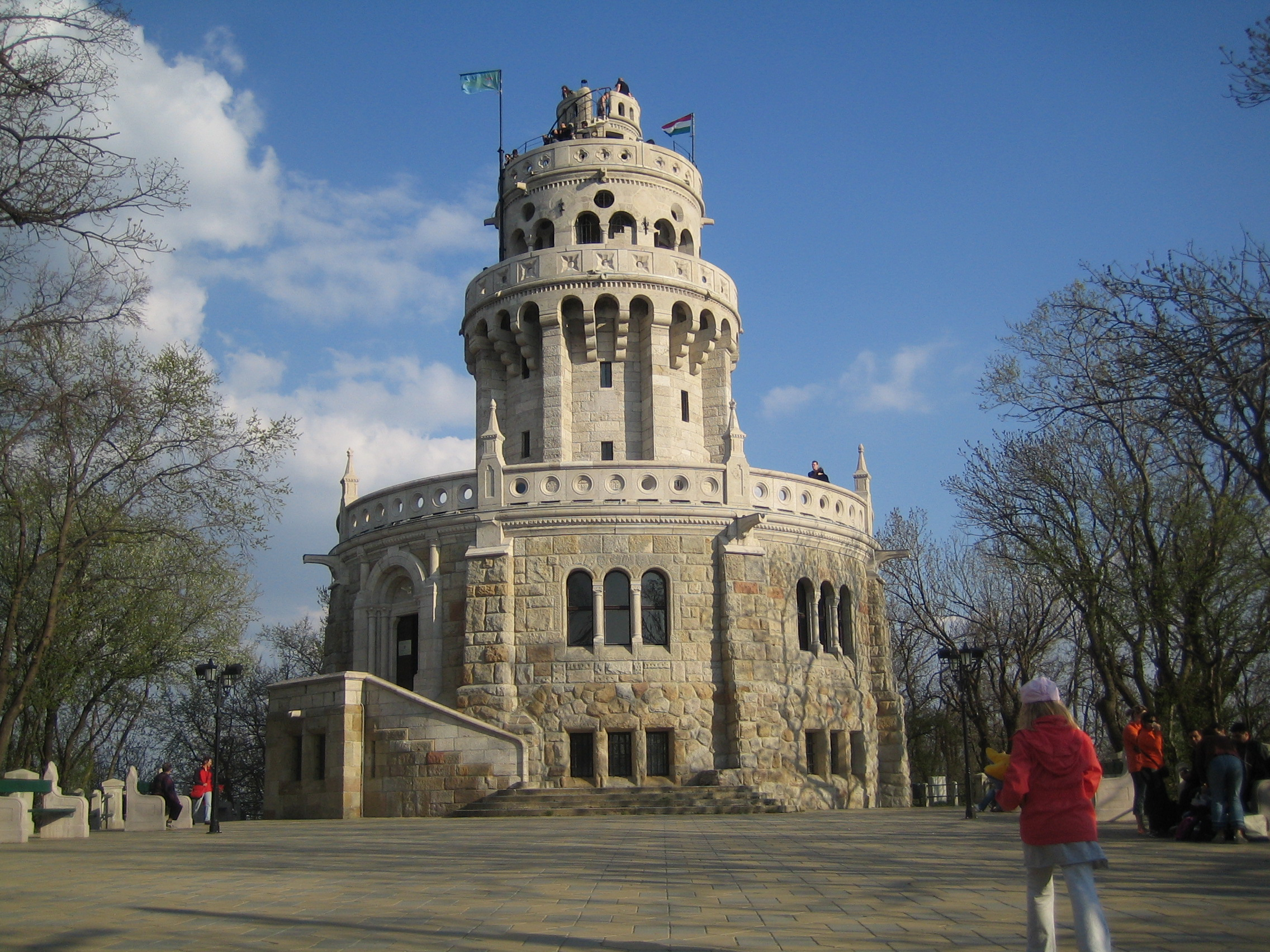
- Interactive map of Elizabeth Lookout
- Coordinates: 47°31′5.51″N 18°57′33.06″E
- Designer: Frigyes Schulek
- Material: Sandstone and limestone
- Height: 23.5 metres (77 ft)
- Beginning date: 1908
- Completion date: 1910
- Opening date: 8 September 1910
- Restored date: 2005

The Elizabeth Lookout (Hungarian: Erzsébet-kilátó) is a historic lookout tower on János Hill (Hungarian: János-hegy) above Budapest. It was designed by Frigyes Schulek, opened in 1910 and named after Queen Elisabeth, wife of Franz Joseph I. The tower is near Budapest's District XII and can be reached from Széll Kálmán tér.

== History ==
Queen Elisabeth visited the hill several times in 1882 to admire the view from the wooden lookout that then stood on the summit. In 1886 the Budapest section of the Hungarian Tourist Association asked the city council for a more durable stone tower. The hotel owner Frigyes Glück promoted the project and raised money for it, and in 1904 the city provided the remaining funds for a budget of 180,000 crowns.

The city engineer Pál Klunzinger drew up the first plans, which he presented in 1906. Schulek reworked the design and replaced the planned conical roof with two terraces, and the tower was built to his modified plans. Construction began on 7 June 1908, and the tower was opened on 8 September 1910. The 23.5-metre (77 ft) tower is built of sandstone from Pilisborosjenő in its lower part and limestone from Budakalász in its upper part.

The tower was closed in 1981 because of its poor condition and was restored in 1992. A further renovation began in 2001, and the tower was fully restored by 2005.

== Buda hills ==
At 527 meters (1,729 ft), János-hegy is the highest point in Budapest. Other hills in the area, Nagy-Hárs hill (English: Great Lime Hill) and Kis-Hárs hill (English: Little Lime Hill), reach 454 meters (1,490 ft) and 362 meters (1,188 ft), respectively. In clear weather, the Mátra Mountains are visible, 80 kilometres (50 mi) distant. On the far eastern horizon one might see the Great Hungarian Plain (Hungarian: Nagyalföld).

== See also ==
- Hárshegy
