= Frigyes Schulek =

Hungarian architect (1841–1919)

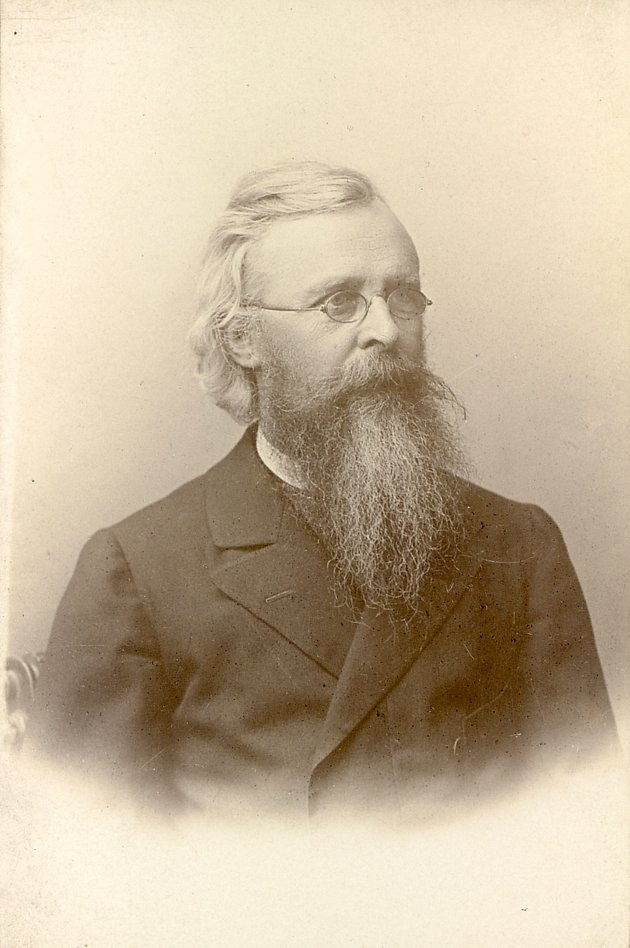
- Frigyes Schulek (ca. 1896)
- Born: Friedrich Schuleck; 19 November 1841; Pest, Kingdom of Hungary, Austrian Empire
- Died: 5 September 1919; Balatonlelle, Hungarian Republic
- Education: Technical University of Budapest (1857–1860); Academy of Fine Arts Vienna (1861–1867)
- Occupation: Architect
- Spouse: Johanna Schulek
- Children: 5
- Practice: Technical University of Budapest; Hungarian University of Fine Arts
- Buildings: Elizabeth Lookout; Fisherman's Bastion; Matthias Church

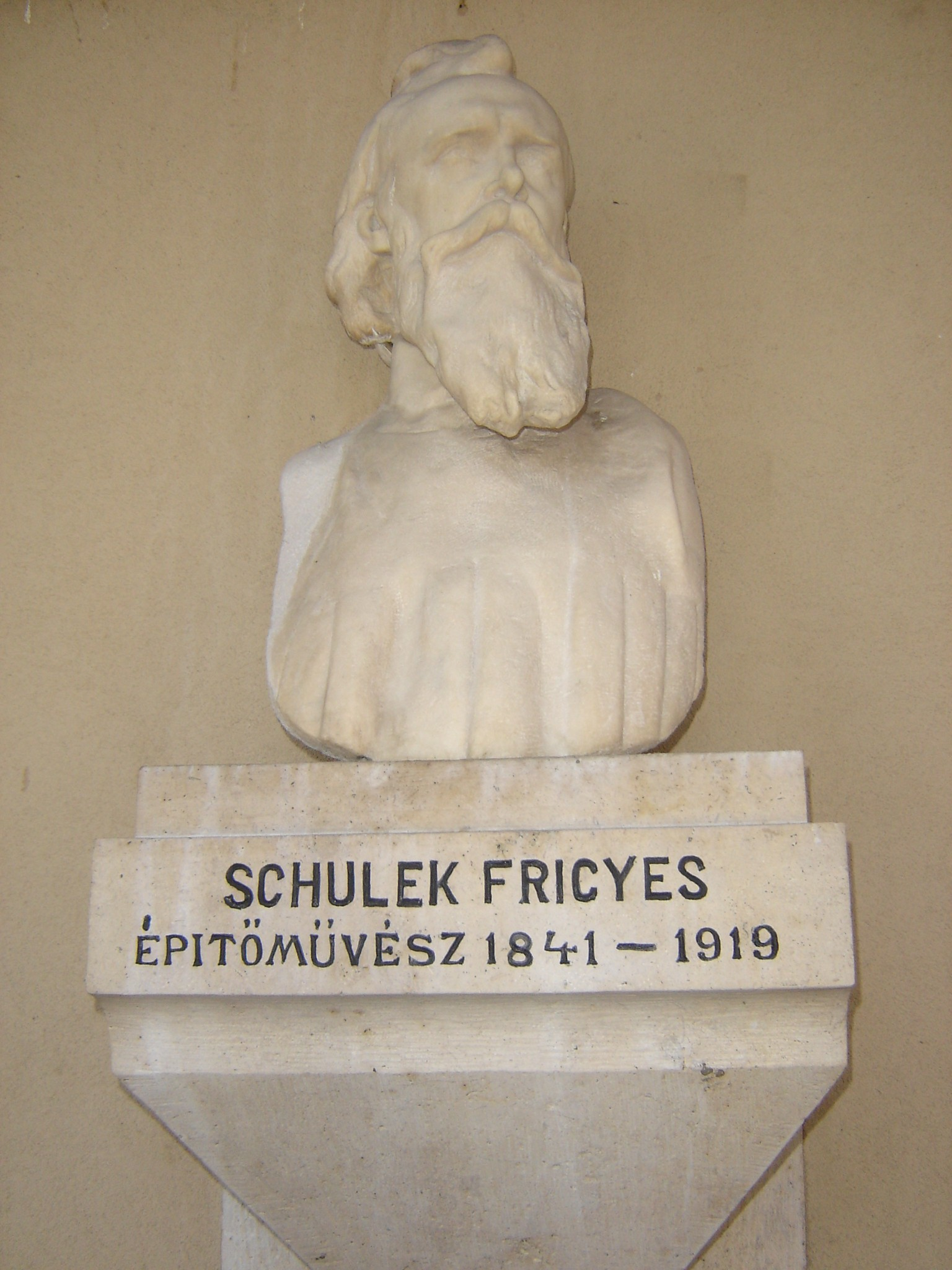
Bust of Frigyes Schulek, sculpted by Alajos Stróbl

Frigyes Schulek (19 November 1841 – 5 September 1919) was a Hungarian architect, a professor at József Technical University and a member of the Hungarian Academy of Sciences (Magyar Tudományos Akadémia).

== Life ==
=== Education ===
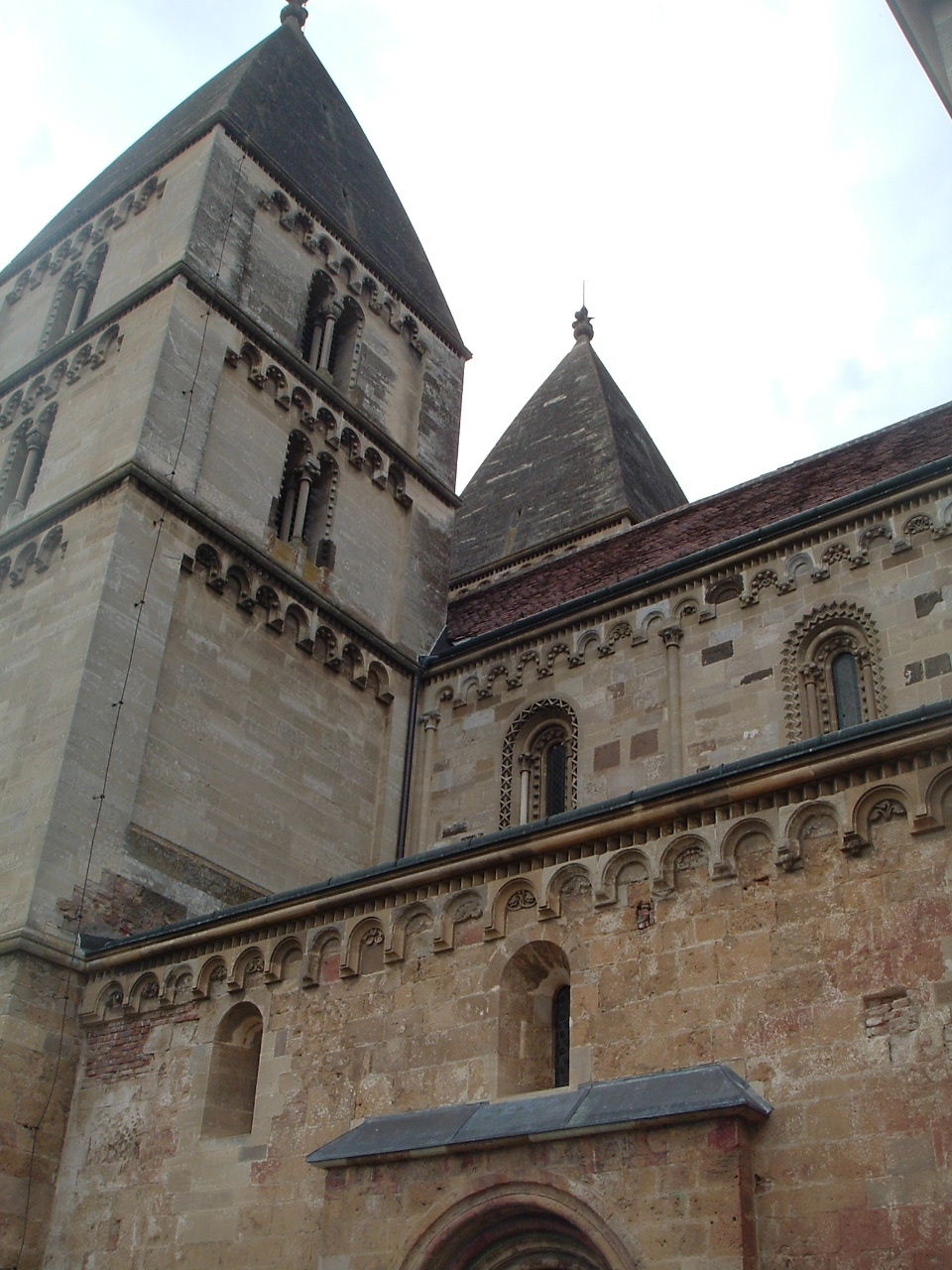
Frigyes Schulek was instrumental in the restoration of the Jáki Church

Schulek was born in Pest and began school in Buda. His mother was Auguszta Zsigmondy. His father Ágost Schulek held a position in the Finance Ministry of Lajos Kossuth. The Schulek family accompanied Kossuth's government on its flight to Debrecen during the Hungarian Revolution of 1848, then returned to the capital. After the suppression of the struggle for independence, Ágost Schulek was declared persona non grata, and the family returned to Debrecen.

Graduating in 1857, Frigyes Schulek enrolled in the Buda Polytechnic (József Technical University), from which he received his diploma in 1861. Thereafter he attended the Academy of Fine Arts (Akademie der bildenden Künste) in Vienna which he finished in 1867.

He became a member of the "Wiener Bauhütte" where he studied under Friedrich von Schmidt, who profoundly influenced his later interest in Middle Ages architecture.

In 1866 he briefly worked on the restoration of the Regensburg Cathedral, subsequently visiting France and Italy.

From 1871 he taught architectural drawing at the Budapest Art School, where, as a colleague of Imre Steindl, he helped design Pest's City Hall. In 1872 he was appointed architect of the newly founded Provisional Monuments Commission (Műemlékek Országos Bizottság), later known as the National Monuments Commission, the first such independent Hungarian organization. Here he coordinated the reconstruction and restoration of mediæval castles and churches.

Ancestors of Frigyes Schulek: hu: Schulek család (felvidéki)

=== Matthias church (Mátyás Templom) ===
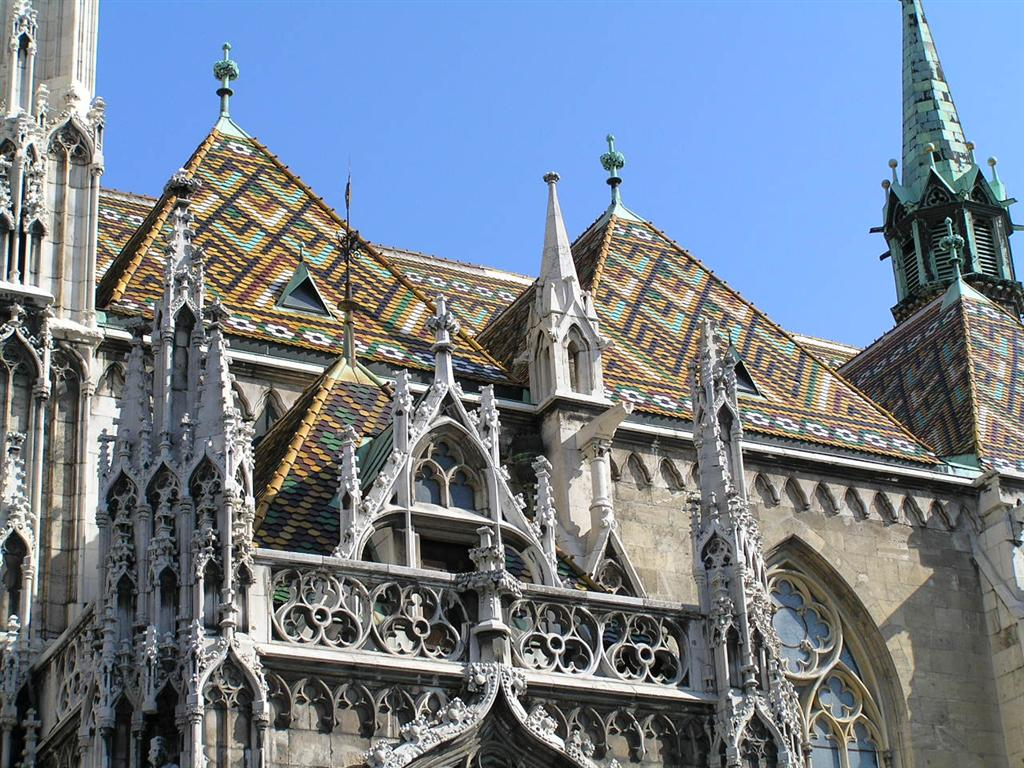
Patterned roof design of Schulek's restored Matthias Church

Between 1874 and 1896 Schulek rebuilt the Church of Our Lady in Buda Castle, which is generally regarded as his chief work. Dating to 1247, the edifice was used for coronations from the crowning of Charles I in 1309 and is today known as the Matthias Church, after King Matthias, who added side chapels and an oratory in 1470.

In the course of planning the reconstruction, he did a thorough field survey of the Gothic church to expose the varying original elements of the building to learn how it had been built, rebuilt and enlarged over time. Originally built in an early French Gothic style, it had been destroyed by fire in 1526, then reopened as a mosque in 1541. After the Ottoman period and its 1586 reconversion to a church, the Franciscans and, later, the Jesuits maintained the edifice. Rather than choosing a particular historic period to interpret while conserving evidence of its earlier and later appearance, as is modern practice, Schulek practically constructed the church anew, without preserving the various historic interventions, and had nearly every stone replaced or recarved. On the west façade and the spire, where he could find no documentary evidence to assist him, he detailed his own new designs, to the point that the building as it stands today is almost entirely his creation.

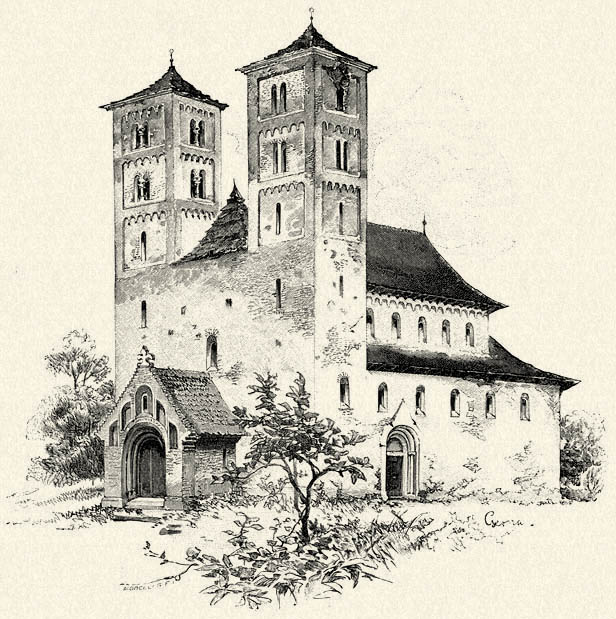
Calvinist Reformed Church in Ákos (today Acâș in Romania)

=== Professorship ===
In 1903, following Imre Steindl's death, Schulek was appointed professor of medieval architecture at the Technical University of Budapest, a post he held until 1913. He became a corresponding member of the Hungarian Academy of Sciences in 1895 and was made an honorary member in 1917.

== Architectural designs ==
His other restorations include the town hall of Lőcse (now Levoča, Slovakia) and churches at Ákos (now Acâș in Romania), Karcsa and Pozsony (now Bratislava, Slovakia).

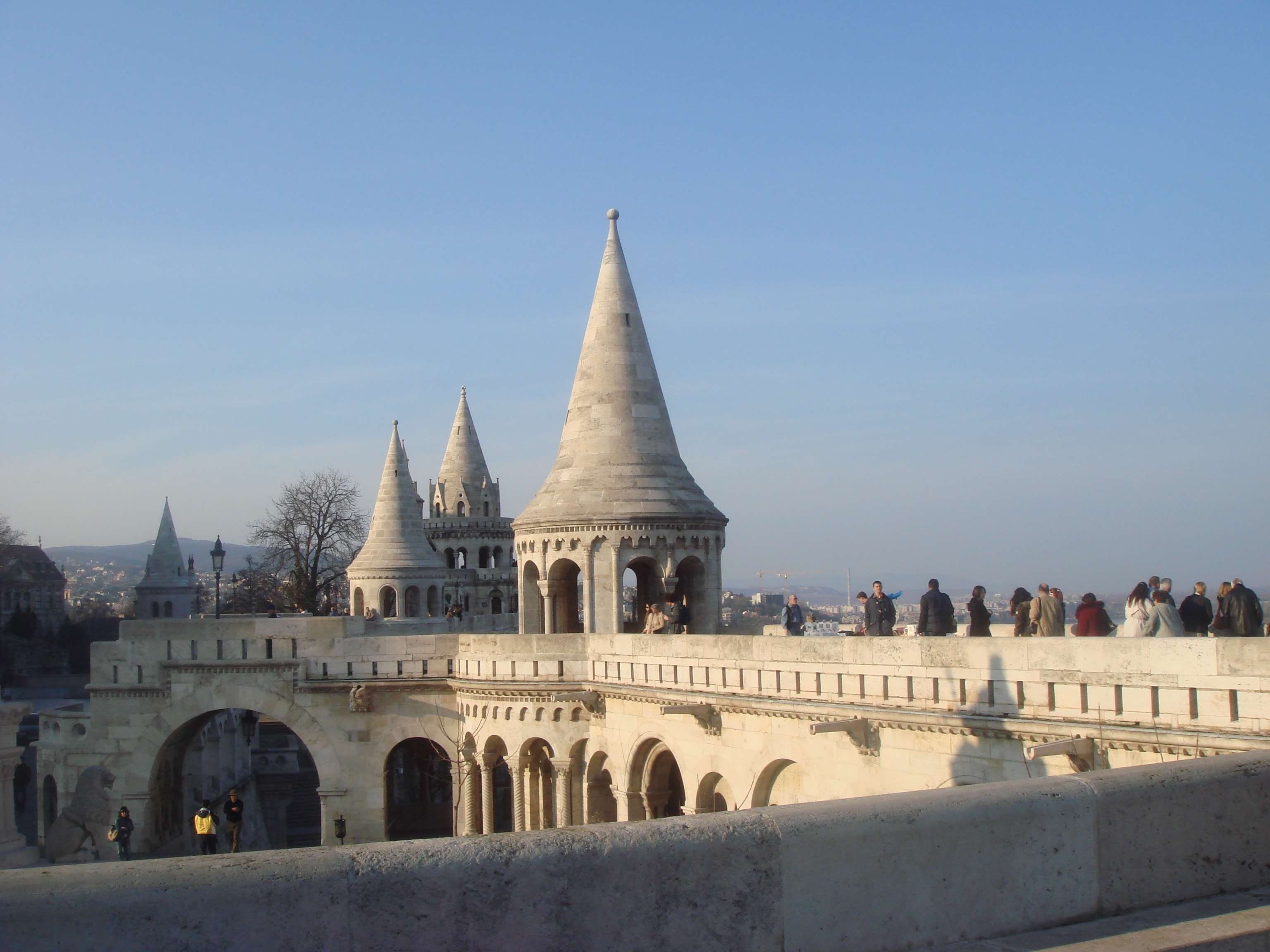
Promenade atop Fisherman's Bastion

Of the few buildings Schulek designed himself, most are in the Neo-Romanesque style. These include the Calvinist Reformed Church (1880–83) in Szeged and the Elisabeth Lookout (1908–10) at János-hegy, Budapest. Between 1895 and 1903 Schulek designed corridors, terraces and towers to connect still-extant portions of the hill fortress behind Matthias Church. Known as the Fisherman's Bastion (Halászbástya), the viewpoint has become a city landmark.

His 1909 design for the Votive Church of Szeged (Fogadalmi templom), a twin-spired structure with red-brick façades and white stone trim, was modified by Ernő Foerk, and construction was completed by 1930.

== Personal life ==
He married Johanna Riecke. They had together five children.

== Bibliography ==
- J. S isa: Schulek, Frigyes (Friedrich). In: Österreichisches Biographisches Lexikon 1815–1950 (ÖBL). Vol. 11, Verlag der Österreichischen Akademie der Wissenschaften, Vienna 1999, ISBN 3-7001-2803-7, p. 314 f.
