= Matthias Church =

Catholic church in Budapest, Hungary

Coordinates: 47°30′07″N 19°02′03″E

- Church of Our Lady of Buda; Hungarian: Budavári Nagyboldogasszony-templom
- Hungarian: Mátyás-templom
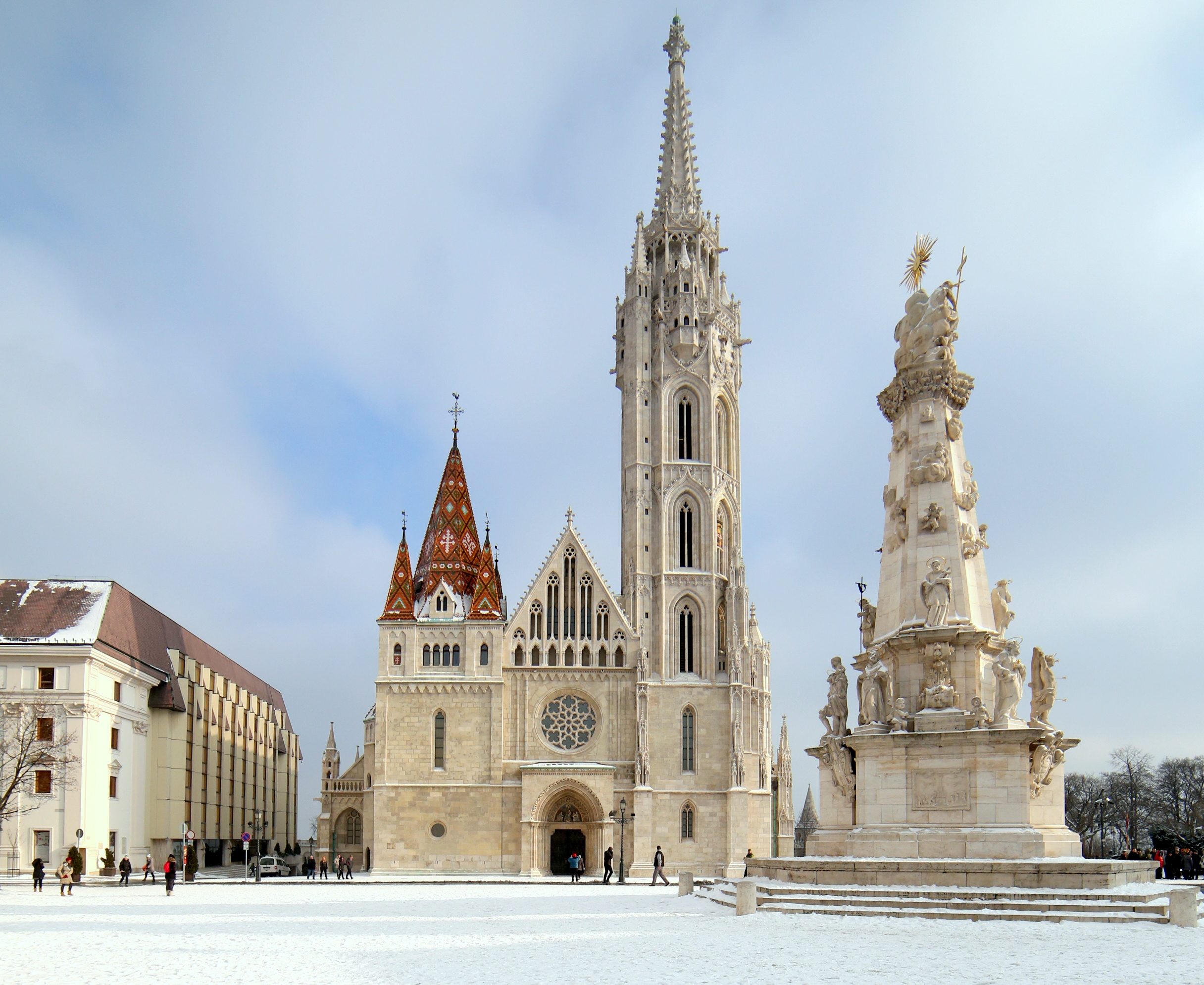
- Matthias Church in 2016

- Location within Budapest Location within Hungary
- Location: Budapest
- Country: Hungary
- Denomination: Catholic
- Website: www.matyas-templom.hu

History
- Status: Parish church
- Founded: 11th century
- Founder: Saint Stephen of Hungary

Architecture
- Functional status: Active
- Years built: 11th century 15th century (rebuilt)

Administration
- Archdiocese: Esztergom-Budapest

Clergy
- Rector: László Süllei

UNESCO World Heritage Site
- Official name: Budapest, including the Banks of the Danube, the Buda Castle Quarter and Andrássy Avenue
- Criteria: Cultural: ii, iv
- Reference: 400
- Inscription: 1987 (11th Session)
- Extensions: 2002
- Area: 473.3 ha (1,170 acres)

The Church of the Assumption of the Buda Castle (Hungarian: Nagyboldogasszony-templom), more commonly known as the Matthias Church (Hungarian: Mátyás-templom) and more rarely as the Coronation Church of Buda, is a Catholic church in Holy Trinity Square, Budapest, Hungary, in front of the Fisherman's Bastion at the heart of Buda's Castle District.

According to church tradition, it was originally built in Romanesque style in 1015, although few references exist. The current building was constructed in the florid late Gothic style in the second half of the 14th century and was extensively restored in the late 19th century. It was the second largest church of medieval Buda and the seventh largest church of the medieval Hungarian Kingdom. It is a historic building with an important history. The last two Kings of Hungary were crowned within its walls: Franz Joseph I of Hungary, and Charles IV of Hungary.

The church was also the location of the "Marian Miracle" of Buda. In 1686, during the siege of Buda by the Holy League, a wall of the church - used as a mosque by the Ottoman occupiers of the city - collapsed due to cannon fire. It turned out that an old votive Madonna statue was hidden behind the wall. As the sculpture of the Virgin Mary appeared before the praying Muslims, the morale of the Muslim garrison collapsed and the city fell on the same day.

== History ==
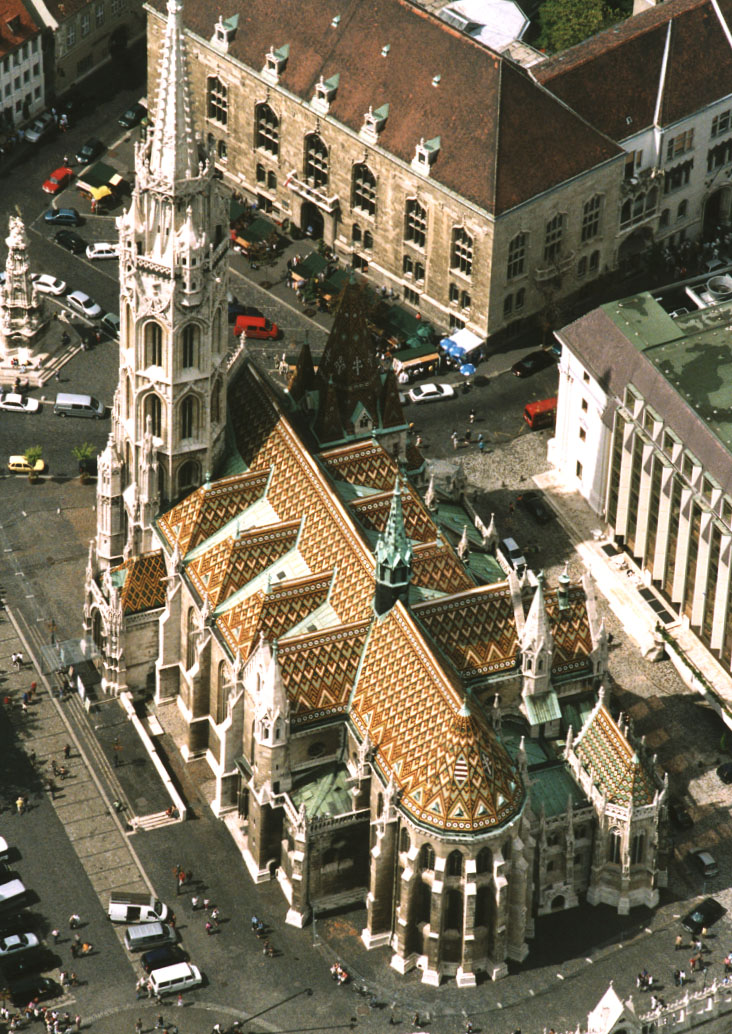
The Coronation Church of Our Lady and – top left – Square of Holy Trinity (Szentháromság tér) with the Holy Trinity Column built in 1713.

According to the tradition, the first church on the site was founded by Saint Stephen, King of Hungary, in 1015: this is based on an inscription erected in 1690 inside the church and burned in 1748, which some previous references seem to confirm. However, there is no clear evidence of the foundation by St. Stephen. This building was destroyed in 1241 by the Mongols; the current building was constructed in the latter half of the 13th century. Originally named after the Virgin Mary, taking names such as "The Church of Mary" and "The Church of Our Lady," since the 19th century the church has been referred to as Matthias Church, after King Matthias, who ordered the transformation of its original southern tower.

=== Re-foundation in the 13th Century ===
King Béla IV of Hungary after the Mongol invasion, between 1255 and 1269, replaced the older, smaller church with a towering three-nave basilica. During the first phase of construction (1255–1260), a main shrine and auxiliary shrines were built, under the direction of Villard de Honnecourt. The first stage of the construction of the main church of Buda is closest relative to the Lyon Cathedral. The group of masters consisted of the builders of the Cistercian Monastery of Tišnov, Czech Republic, who travelled to Hungary after the Mongol invasion probably at the behest of the cousin of king Béla IV, Agnes of Bohemia. The reasons for its disintegration of this group around 1260 are unknown.

The construction was completed through a second phase, between 1260 and 1269. The work of the second group of masters was already influenced by Northern French religious architecture, mediated by German master builders. Other works of this group are the Franciscan Kecske Church in Sopron, Hungary, and the Monastery of Klosterneuburg, Austria, probably related to the Dominican monastery of Margaret Island, Budapest, which was the home of a daughter of Béla IV, St Margaret of the Árpád House. The king, out of regard for his daughter, granted to the monastery the jus patronatus over the Buda church for a period of time.

The Church of the Assumption of the Buda Castle became the earliest and most complete work of classical Gothic church architecture in Hungary, giving a complete picture of the architectural schools of Béla's era.

=== 14th century: Gothic hall church ===
In the second half of the 14th century was rebuilt into a Gothic hall church. The whole building was remodeled in a mature Gothic style. In 1370 king Louis I of Hungary began with the construction of the iconic Maria Gate at the southwest. The closest parallel to this representative two-door gate is the portal of St. Lorenz Church in Nuremberg, built fifteen years earlier. During the reign of Louis, a complete redesign of the church basilica space was begun in the spirit of mature Gothic architecture. The arches of the side naves were raised to the height of the main nave, and huge windows with rich stone lattice were placed on the high walls, thus creating a bright, airy hall. During the reign of king Sigismund, the side shrines were extended and provided with an octagonal Gothic closure. In the final phase of the construction, the masters of the Prague Parler workshop also worked on the building. Between 1412 and 1433 they ordered the burial chapel of the aristocratic Garai family beside the north side sanctuary at the request of Nicholas II Garai. The closest relative of the newly formed hall church is the Abbey of Hronský Beňadik, current Slovakia.

=== 15th century: Matthias Church ===
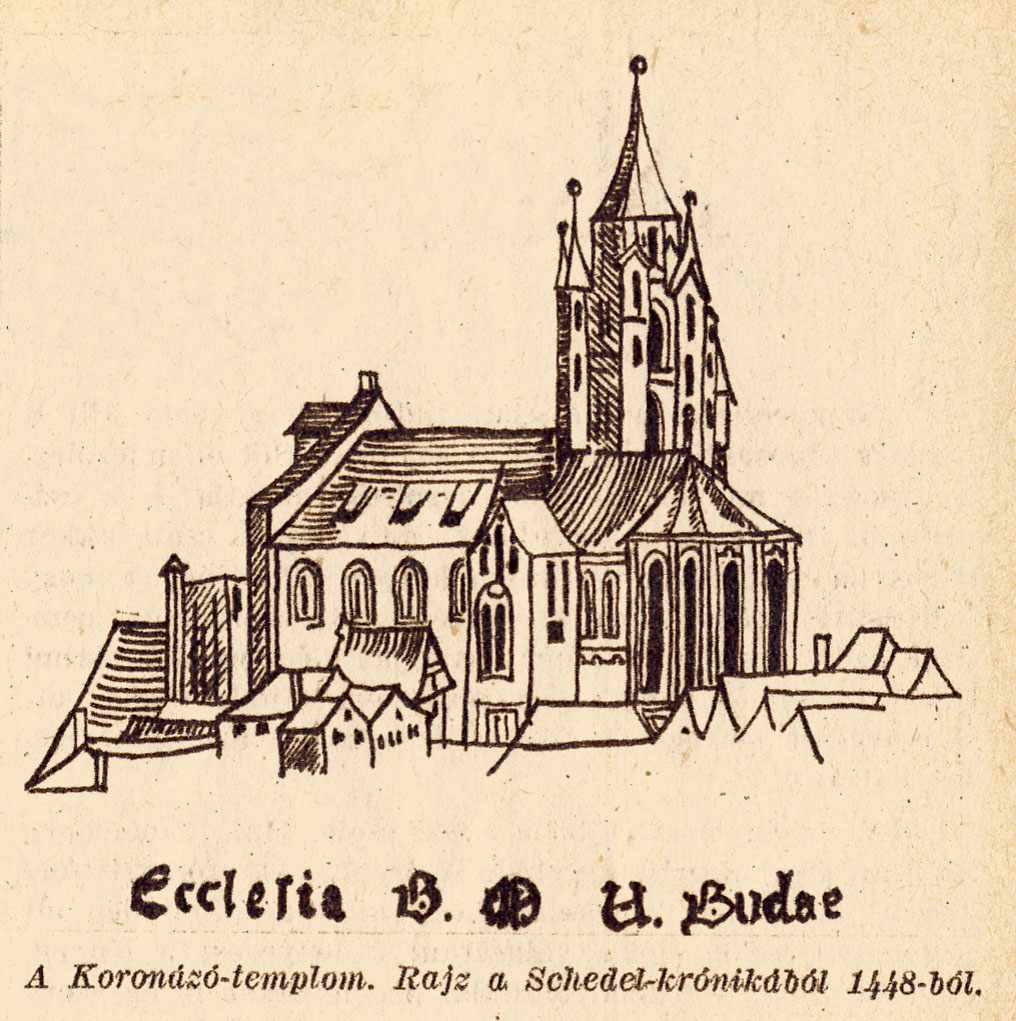
A representation of the church, 1448

The church reached its peak in medieval prosperity during the reign of king Matthias Corvinus. The king built the southwest bell tower, one of the finest pieces of Gothic architecture in Hungary. According to the coat of arms of Matthias, the south tower, which collapsed in 1384, was rebuilt in 1470. Apart from its destroyed helmet, the bell tower still retains its original form, although in the late 19th century a complete replacement of its stone material became inevitable. However, the head of the great arch supporting the choir still preserves its original stone.

Matthias also erected a royal oratory near the southern sanctuary of the church, but it was completely destroyed during the Turkish occupation. At that time, at the end of the 15th century, they began the construction of the northwestern tower, which had already been completed with the exception of the helmet before the Turkish conquest.

=== 16th century: Ottoman invasion ===
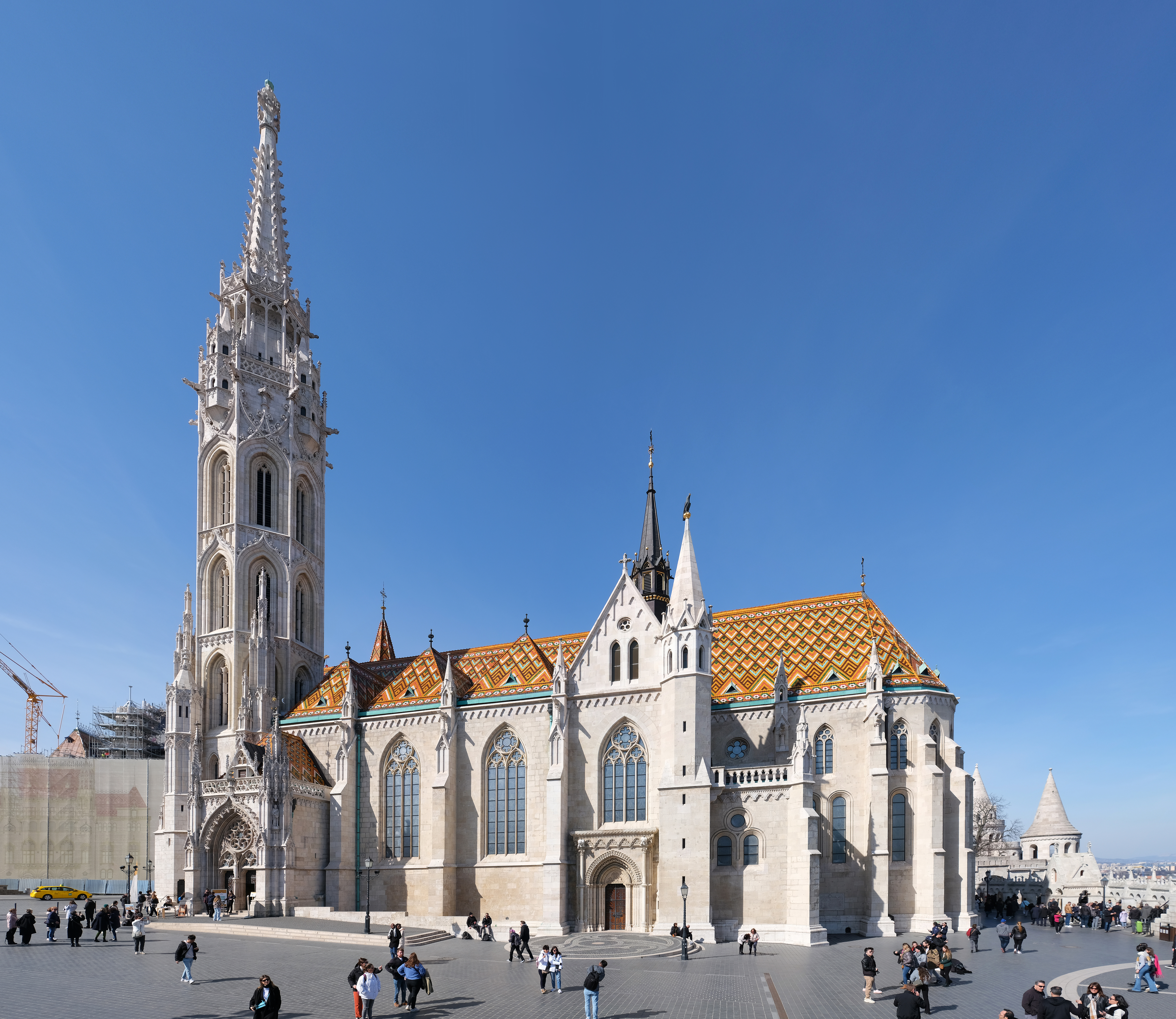
The church

During the first Turkish invasion in 1526, the medieval roof structure and most of its equipment were destroyed. In 1541 the rebuilt Church of the Blessed Virgin was converted into a mosque by the Turks after the final conquest of Buda; in this church the Sultan Suleiman gave thanks to Allah for the victory. Its equipment and altars were discarded and the painted walls were plastered over. While most other churches in Buda were destroyed by the Ottomans, the Church of Mary survived, converted into a mosque and called from this point Büyük (Great), Eski (Old) or Suleiman Han Cami. Of course, destruction could not be completely avoided; the Matthias royal oratory, the north tower, the Garai chapel and the side chapels were demolished to use their stones elsewhere.

=== 17th and 18th centuries: Jesuit church ===
After Buda was retaken (1686), the church first became the property of the Franciscans, and then of the Jesuit Order, which restored it in Baroque style. Between 1688 and 1702, a huge dormitory was built on its north side and a three-story seminary on its south side. Between 1702 and 1714, the originally free-standing church was made part of a large building complex. Although the scene of great pastoral work, the church lost almost all its medieval ornamentation, rendering its exterior façade insignificant.

In 1690 the Palatine of Hungary Paul I, Prince Esterházy built the new Baroque main altar, and in 1696 built a lobby in front of the main gate. In the same year, Matthias' bell tower was crowned with a Baroque onion dome. The Chapel of Loreto was built in 1707, this received a bell tower in 1719, and soon afterwards its side chapels were erected, and a new sacristy was erected in place of the Bride's Gate.

Baroque transformations were conducted in many medieval elements; only the few windows of the Matthias Bell tower guarded the original character of the church's facade.

After the dissolution of the Jesuit Order in 1773, the council of the city of Buda owned the church.

=== 19th century: Schulek's reconstruction of the church ===
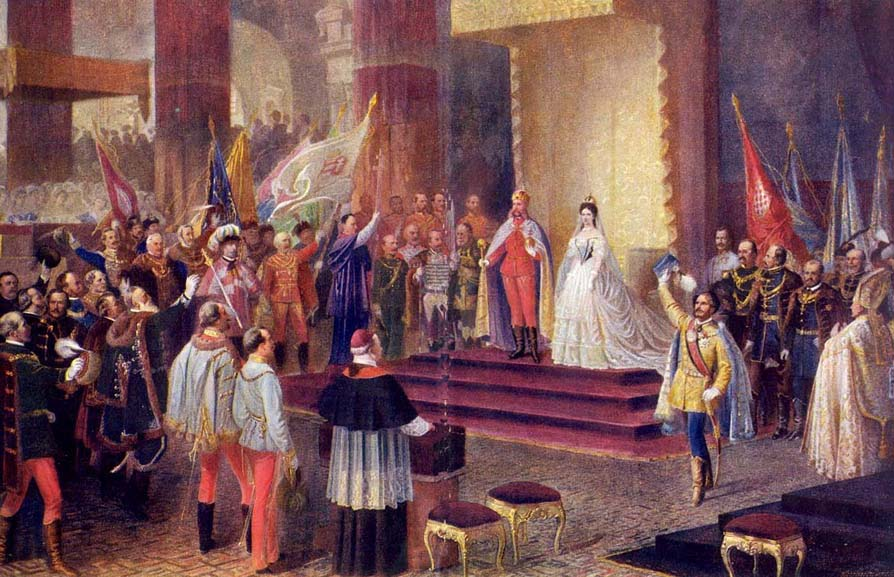
Coronation of Franz Joseph I of Hungary inside the church. 19th century painting.

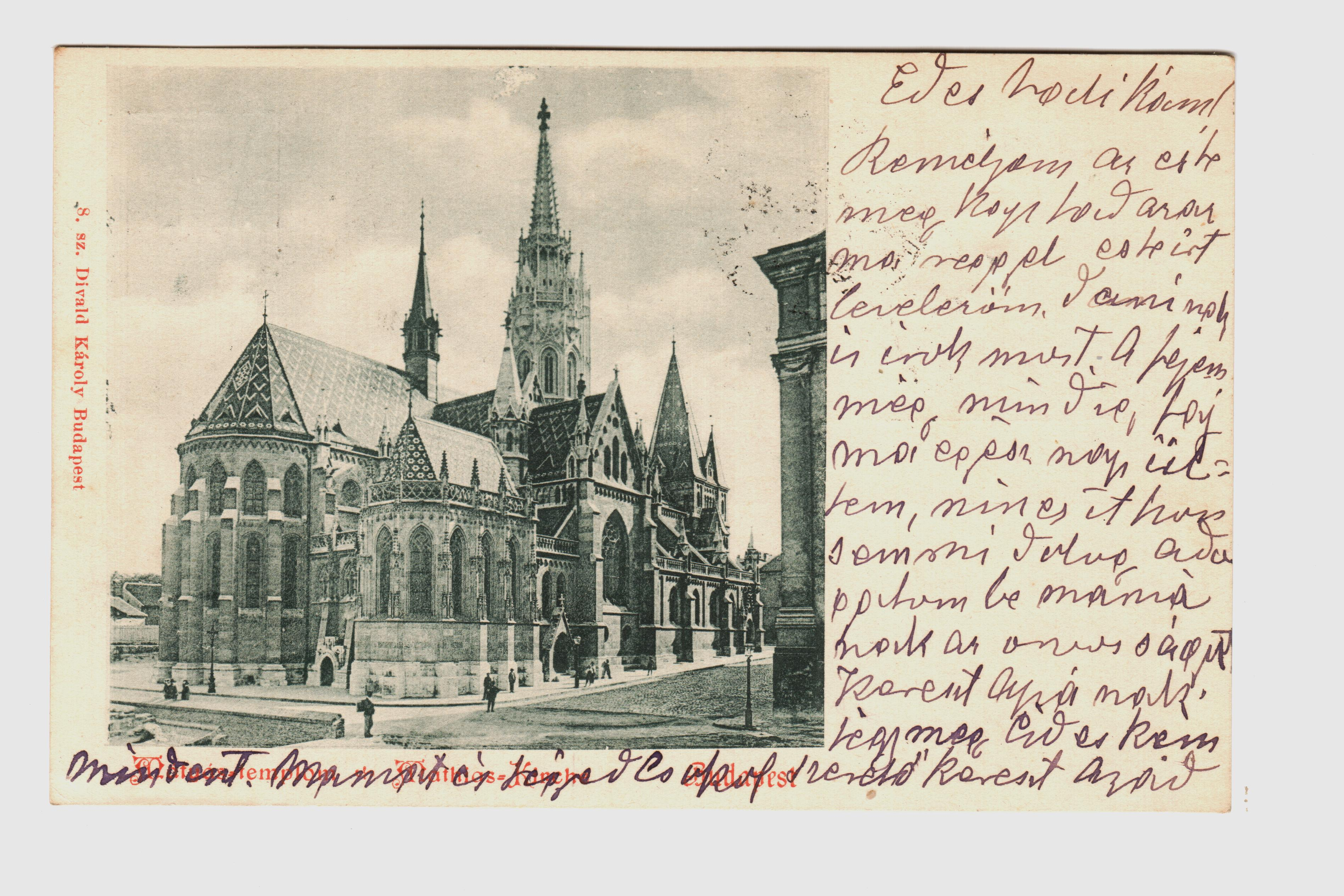
Matthias Church in 1900

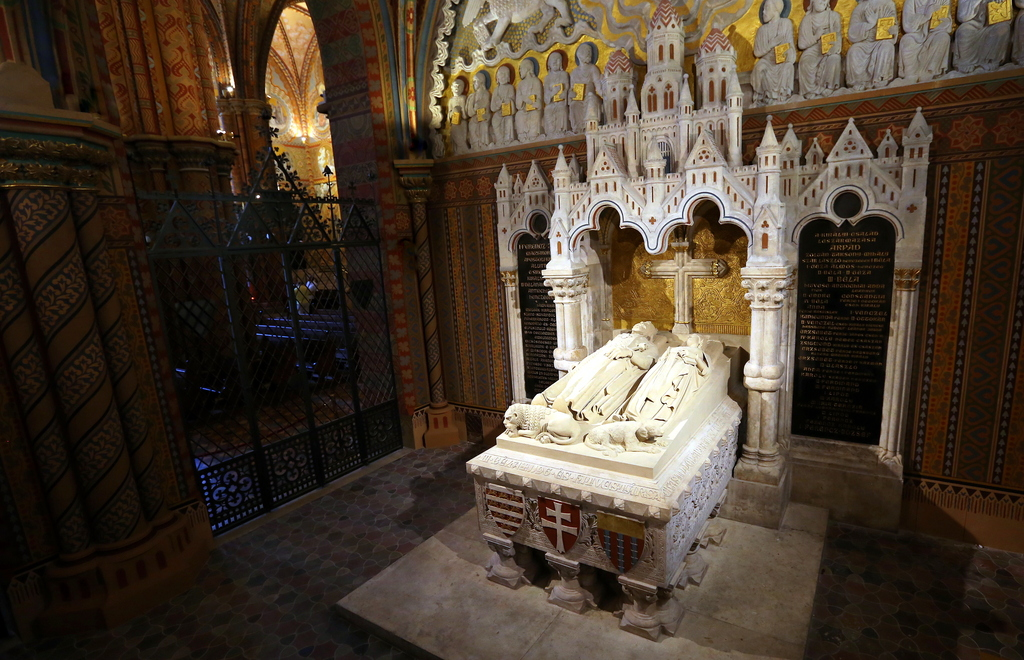
Tombs of Béla III of Hungary and Agnes of Antioch

Under the leadership of the king Franz Joseph I of Austria, between 1874 and 1896, a major rebuilding took place, under the architect Frigyes Schulek, which restored the original image of the building. The stone carving was done by Jakab Kauser, a well-known family of architects from Pest.

The church was restored to its original 13th-century plan, but a number of early original Gothic elements were uncovered. By also adding new motifs of his own (such as the diamond pattern roof tiles and gargoyles laden spire) Schulek ensured that the work, when finished, would be highly controversial.

Schulek freed the church, enclosed in former Jesuit buildings, at the expense of the demolition of adjacent parts, restoring its original, distinctive character. The vault and walls of the building were demolished to the ground in several places to reconstruct the original architectural solutions. In all the church he removed the Baroque joints and sought to restore the ancient ones, but by completely restoring the damaged parts and surfaces. Thus Sigismund's side sanctuaries were demolished and the original, simpler closures restored; the Maria Gate dating back to Louis I of Hungary was reopened, the Matthias bell tower was renovated – at the same time almost all the original main column capitals were replaced with faithful copies. Wherever he could find no clue, the architect introduced new elements of his own design: he erected a foyer in front of the Maria Gate, he created the new St Stephen's chapel in place of the destroyed Garai chapel, he renovated the Baroque side chapels along the northern nave in a neo-Gothic style; based on old images, he topped the southern tower with the rich neo-Gothic cap and balcony row that we see today. The northern tower was equipped with a late Romanesque style top, a pediment was placed between the two towers. He built the two sacristies and a royal oratory opening to the main apse from the north. The crypt, which had been built in 1780, was also renewed in a free neo-Gothic style.

Bertalan Székely and Károly Lotz directed, together with Schulek, the interior decoration and furnishing, utilising the remains of the medieval wall paintings. They painted the figurative murals themselves, made the designs for the stained glass windows executed by Ede Kratzmann, and for the new sculptural decoration made by Ferenc Mikula. The altarpieces were painted by Mihály Zichy (St Imre's chapel) and Gyula Aggházy (Loreto chapel); the bas-relief on the main gate depicting the Our Lady of the Hungarians is by Lajos Lontay. The benches and the organ cabinet were designed by Schulek.

The church was completed in 1893; by the time of the Millenary celebrations it shone, though not in its original forms but in all of its old splendour. In 1898 the remains of Béla III of Hungary and his first wife, Agnes of Antioch, found their final burial place in the chapel of the northern nave of the church. They had been unearthed during the excavations carried out on the ruins of the royal basilica in Székesfehérvár in 1848 (basilica destroyed by the Turks).

The Southwest Virgin Mary gate, - which in the tympanum depicts the Virgin Mary falling asleep - is one of the few original medieval remains from the beginning of the 15th century. This is a replica of the 13th century main gate. The Loreto Chapel, of medieval origin, beneath the southern tower preserves a Madonna statue from the end of the 17th century. This work of art was created to replace the original medieval sculpture of the Madonna, which was walled in during the Turkish occupation in the church.

Assessing Schulek's rebuilding, he did not appreciate the historic importance of the church, which was in a very poor condition, but replaced many of its historical stones with careful copies. However, thanks to his scientific depth and precise work of form, we can today see the former state of this church in its facade. Reconstructed faithfully and, to a lesser extent, re-imagined in a worthy way, the church is the highest-quality example of Hungarian neo-Gothic architecture, and its interior decoration, one of the highest achievements of Eastern European Art Nouveau.

=== 20th century ===
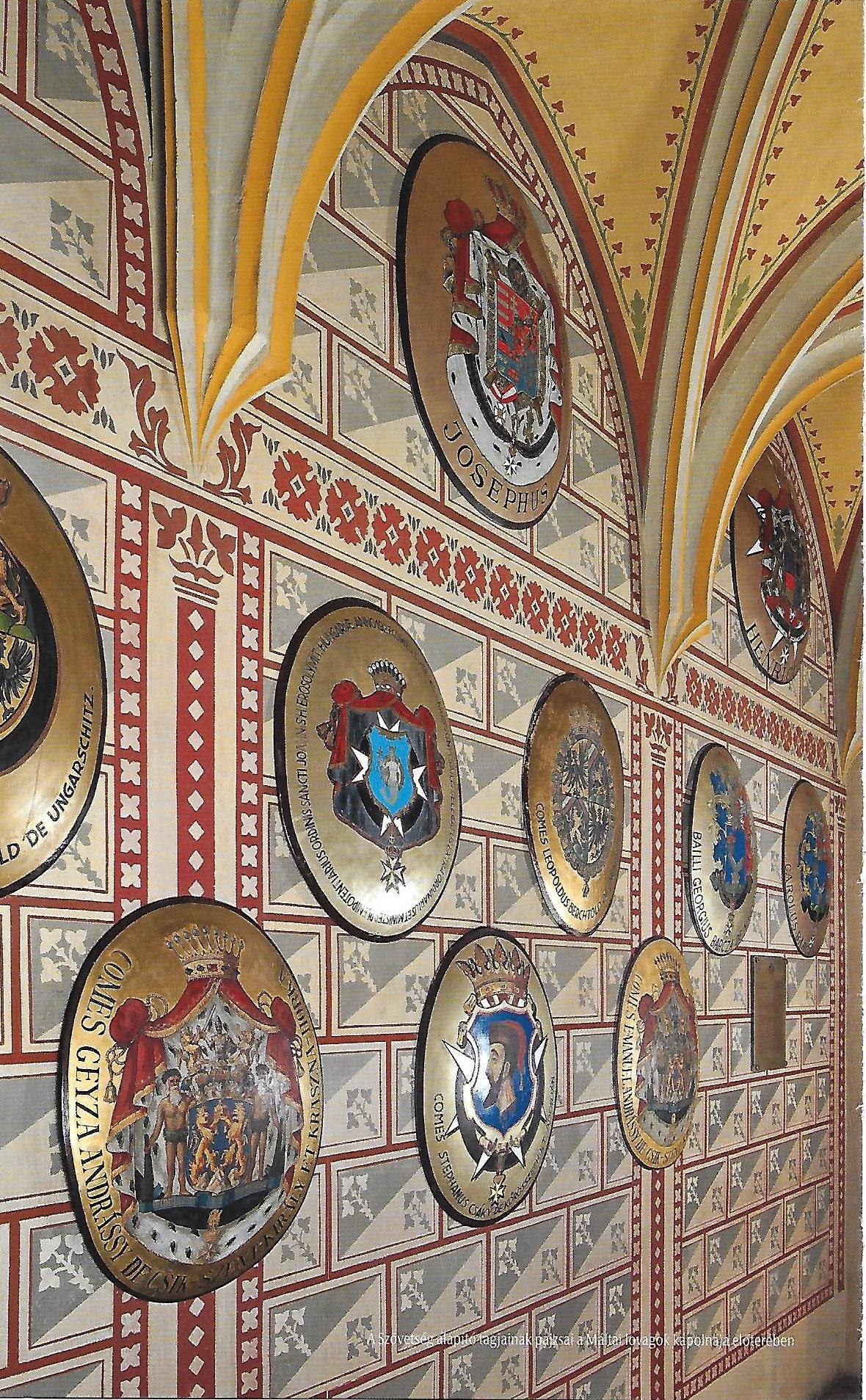
Coat of Arms of the Hungarian Knights of Malta in the foreground of the Chapel of the Knights of Malta

In 1936, on the 250th anniversary of the recapture of the Buda Castle, a Hungarian and Italian inscription commemorating the Baron Michele d'Aste was placed on the right-hand apse wall. Lieutenant-Colonel D'Aste, who died during the battle, contributed greatly to the success of the action. The inscription reads as follows: "Lieutenant Colonel Michele d'Aste, Italian Colonel, on September 2, 1686, was among the first to sacrifice his life for the liberation of Buda"

In 1927 the "Chapel of the Knights of Malta" was created in an oratory in the northern gallery of the church. Around the altar and along the corridor were the shields of the then Hungarian Knights of Malta. A restoration was made in 2005, after which the church authorities and the Hungarian Association of the Order of Malta restored the custom of exposing the coats-of-arms of deceased knights. Around the altar there are five commemorative shields of noteworthy Chaplains of the Order, among them Cardinal Jusztinián György Serédi, and the martyr Bishop Blessed Vilmos Apor. In the foreground one can see the shields of the members from 1925 to 1944, while in the passage from the sacristy to the lower church there are the shields of deceased members after 1945. On All Souls Day each year, after a funeral Mass, the knights place on the wall the coats-of-arms of the members who died during the year.

Before World War II, on the initiative of Pál Teleki, a complete renovation of the church was begun, but the war prevented its completion. During the 1944–1945 siege of Budapest by the Allies, the building was severely damaged. The crypt was used by the Germans for their camp kitchen, and after the fall of the city, the Soviets used the sanctuary to stable their horses. War damage was repaired by the Hungarian State between 1950 and 1970. The five-manual organ, which had been severely damaged during the war, was repaired and re-consecrated in 1984.

In 1994, an unidentified terrorist detonated an IED at the gate of the building that opens towards the Fisherman's Bastion, damaging sixteen of the church's windows.

In 1999 the church was—for the first time in its history—handed over to the Catholic Church as parish property. The state financed restoration works from 2005 to 2015.

== Historical significance ==
The new Church of Mary built by Béla IV of Hungary in 1270 soon became a venue for events of national importance. In 1279 had already held a national council here under the leadership of Lieutenant of the Pope Fülöp Fermói and the Archbishop of Esztergom Lodomer, where they were invited by King Ladislaus IV of Hungary.

In the aftermath of the throne after 1301, the Czech king Wenceslaus III and Bavarian king Otto III were nominated as kings of Hungary here, and then in 1309 at another national council, papal legate Cardinal Gentile Portino da Montefiore, and Archbishop of Esztergom Tamás crowned here with a new crown to the Anjou king Charles I of Hungary. The same king was found here between his death in Visegrád and his funeral in Székesfehérvár.

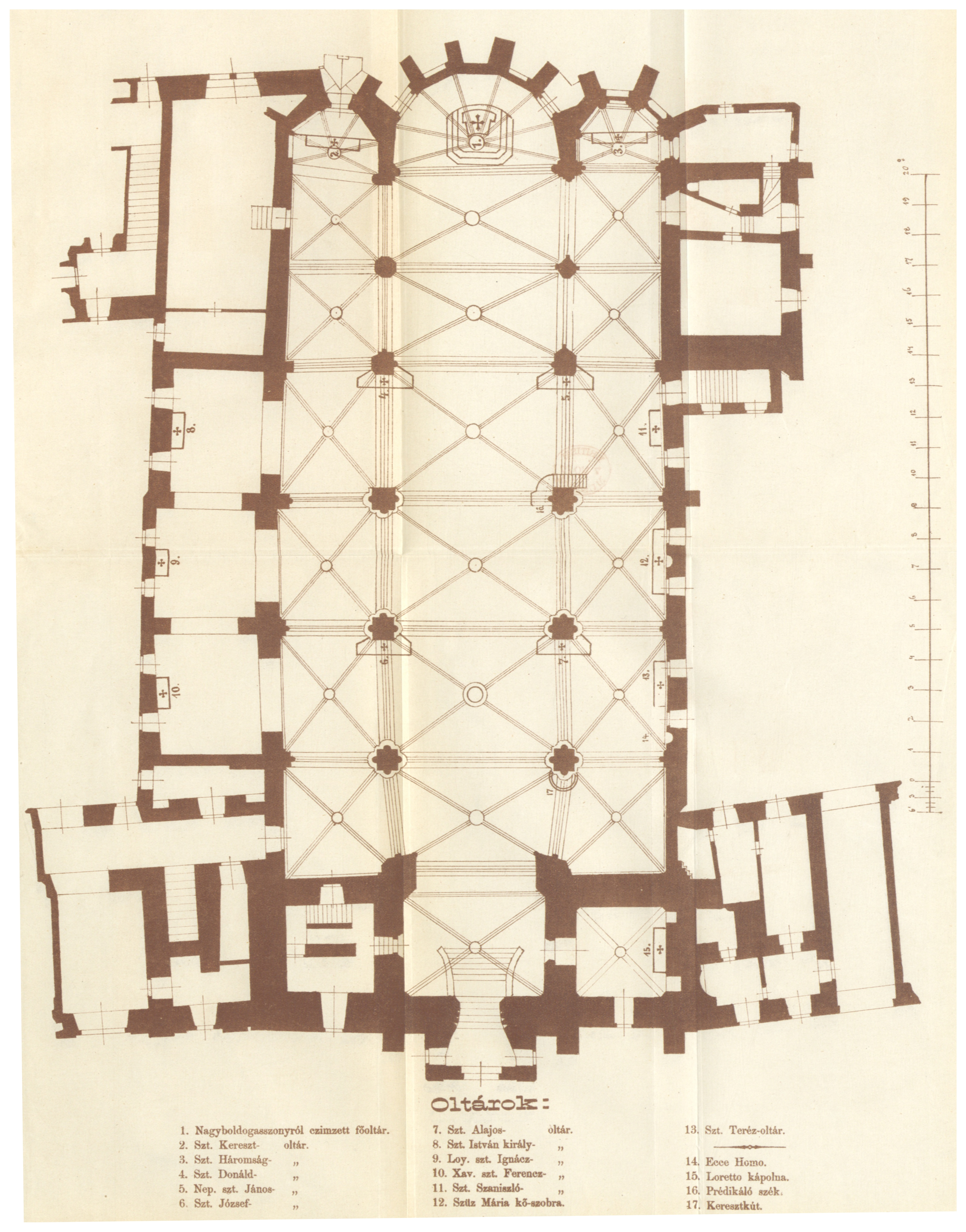
Floor plan of the Matthias Church

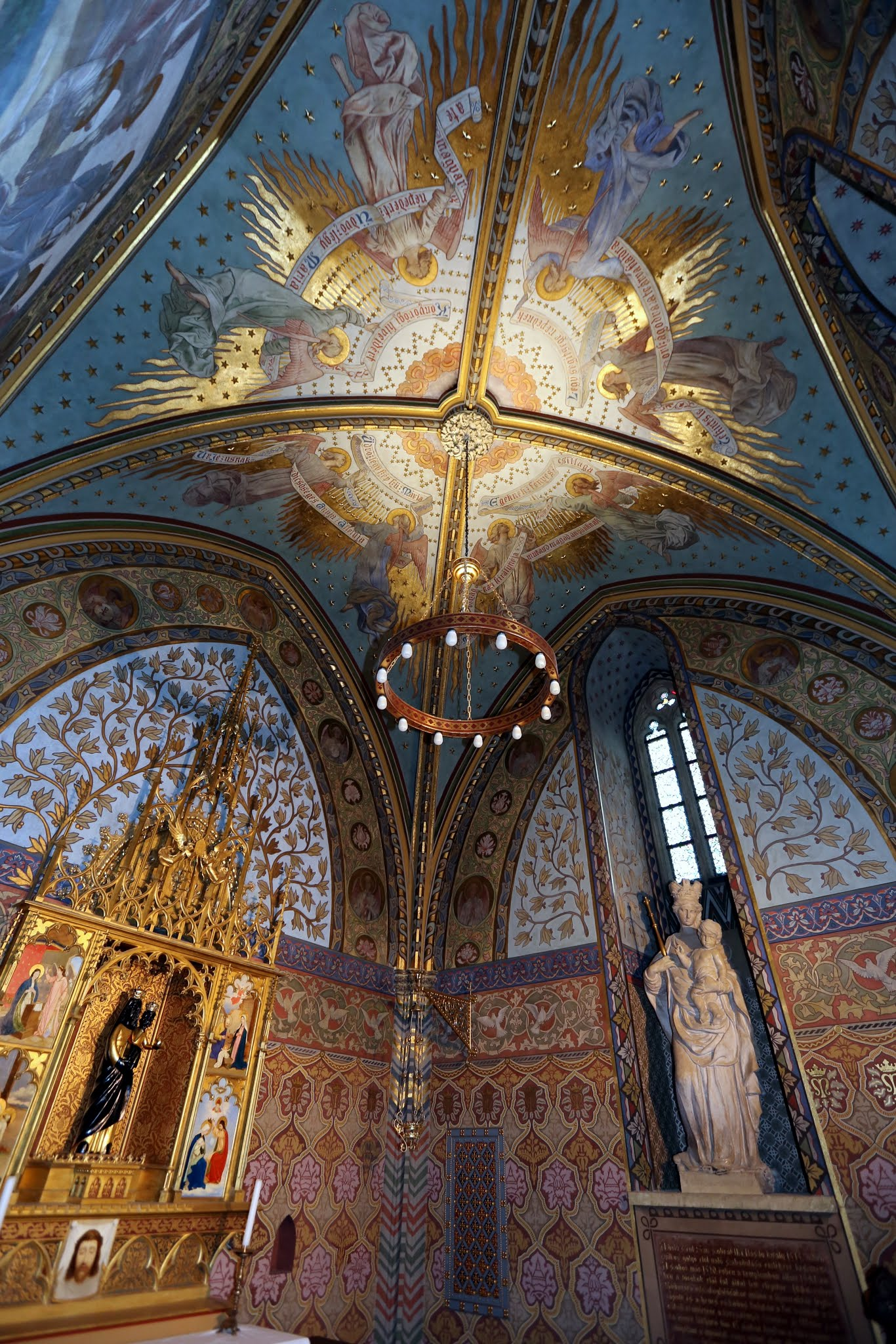
Chapel of Loreto and the 17th century Madonna statue.

In January 1412 King Sigismund for the first time suspended his victory flags on the walls of the church, which had been rebuilt by then, which he captured in the campaign against Republic of Venice. This gesture later created a tradition of John Hunyadi. In 1424, in the Corpus Christi feast as a guest of the German-Roman Emperor Sigismund and the Byzantine emperor Manuel II Palaiologos turned between its walls. After the death of Sigismund in 1438 the Hungarian king Albert II of Germany and in 1440 the Hungarian king Władysław III of Poland was introduced in the church after their election. In 1444 Władysław III, after his triumphant campaign, here held his solemn thanksgiving with John Hunyadi.

St John of Capistrano held a recruiting speech here to promote his involvement and recruit troops for the Turkish campaign. In 1455 John Hunyadi received the cross here from the papal legacy of Carvajal and started from here to Belgrade.

In 1456 Pope Callixtus III founded a cathedral chapter near the church. This was abolished during the Turkish occupation, but the provost title of "Pest-újhegyi", named after the Virgin Mary, has been bestowed by the Hungarian apostolate and from 1920 to the Archbishop of Esztergom.

When Matthias Corvinus ascended the throne, in 1458 the Holy Crown of Hungary was not in Hungary. Therefore, Matthias, returning from his captivity in Prague, solemnly began his reign in the Church of Mary in the form of a "crown without crown": thanking God and Mary, the Grandmother of Hungary, whose inheritance was honored by her father; before the altar he promised to keep the sacred rights, then went to his palace and sat on his throne and began to deal with the affairs of the country.

Matthias held both of his weddings in this church: in 1463 with Catherine of Poděbrady and in 1476 with Beatrice of Naples. The south gate, which is still called the Bride's Gate, reminds us of this. The parish priest of the church at that time was Marcin Bylica, a friend of Matthias, an excellent astronomer, and Regiomontanus.

In 1526 the treasures of the church were carried away to Pozsony (today Bratislava in Slovakia). The Palatine of Hungary István Werbőczy proclaimed here the covenant of the king John Zápolya with the French, the Pope, Venice and Florence. A few months later, at the feast of King St Stephen, the "counter-king", Habsburg Ferdinand I, Holy Roman Emperor attended the Mass here.

It was used as the main mosque of Buda by the occupying Turks from 1541 to 1686. Legend has it that Gül Baba, a member of the Bektási Dervish Order in the temple, whose tomb (mausoleum) is still near Margaret Bridge, it is still the northernmost Islamic pilgrimage site in the world.

The victory of the desperate struggle for Buda was attributed by contemporaries to the miracle of the church's statue of Mary, which was not destroyed by the Turks, but simply bricked up. In 1686, before the last attack of the siege of Vladislaus II. The wall drawn in front of a vow sculpture donated by Vladislaus fell down during a major explosion, and the long-forgotten statue of the Our Lady of the Hungarians appeared in front of the Turks praying in the main mosque (current church of Mary). The triumphant statue of Mary was carried on the streets of Buda in a Thanksgiving procession. Remembering this event, the church is still a place of veneration for the image.

In 1686 the church was owned by the Jesuit Order and were a very careful landlord in their own way: the 87-year pastoral flower in the history of the church, marked by the Society of Jesus. The spiritually deprived city was cultivated and re-catholicized by their college. The Order (also in the wake of the Counter-Reformation) was strongly attached to the Habsburg Ruler, and there are hardly any Hungarians among their members, as was the newly settled citizenship, as in the Middle Ages, being German. Yet it is thanks to these monks that the cult of the Our Lady of the Hungarians and the idea of the Regnum Marianum (the Kingdom of Mary) and the reverence of the holy kings, which became one of the pillars of Hungarian identity and the spiritual foundation of national independence aspirations.

In front of the church, a plague memorial was erected in 1713, the Holy Trinity Column, which served as a model for many similar works in the country.

In 1867, as culmination of the Austro-Hungarian Compromise, cardinal-Archbishop of Esztergom János Simor crowned here as Hungarian king the Austrian Emperor Franz Joseph I and his wife, Elizabeth with the Holy Crown. The Coronation Mass by Franz Liszt was performed for the first time in this important celebration.

On 30 December 1916, Charles IV and his wife, Queen Zita were crowned here, by the cardinal-Archbishop of Esztergom János Csernoch with the Holy Crown.

In 2000, in the year of the Great Jubilee, remembering the former sending of the crown, the young people of the church made a fresh copy of the Holy Crown of Hungary for Pope John Paul II which was brought to him at the Vatican on a walking pilgrimage, blessed in Rome and crowned with the statue of Virgin Mary on the main altar at the Assumption of the Pope.

== Pulpit ==
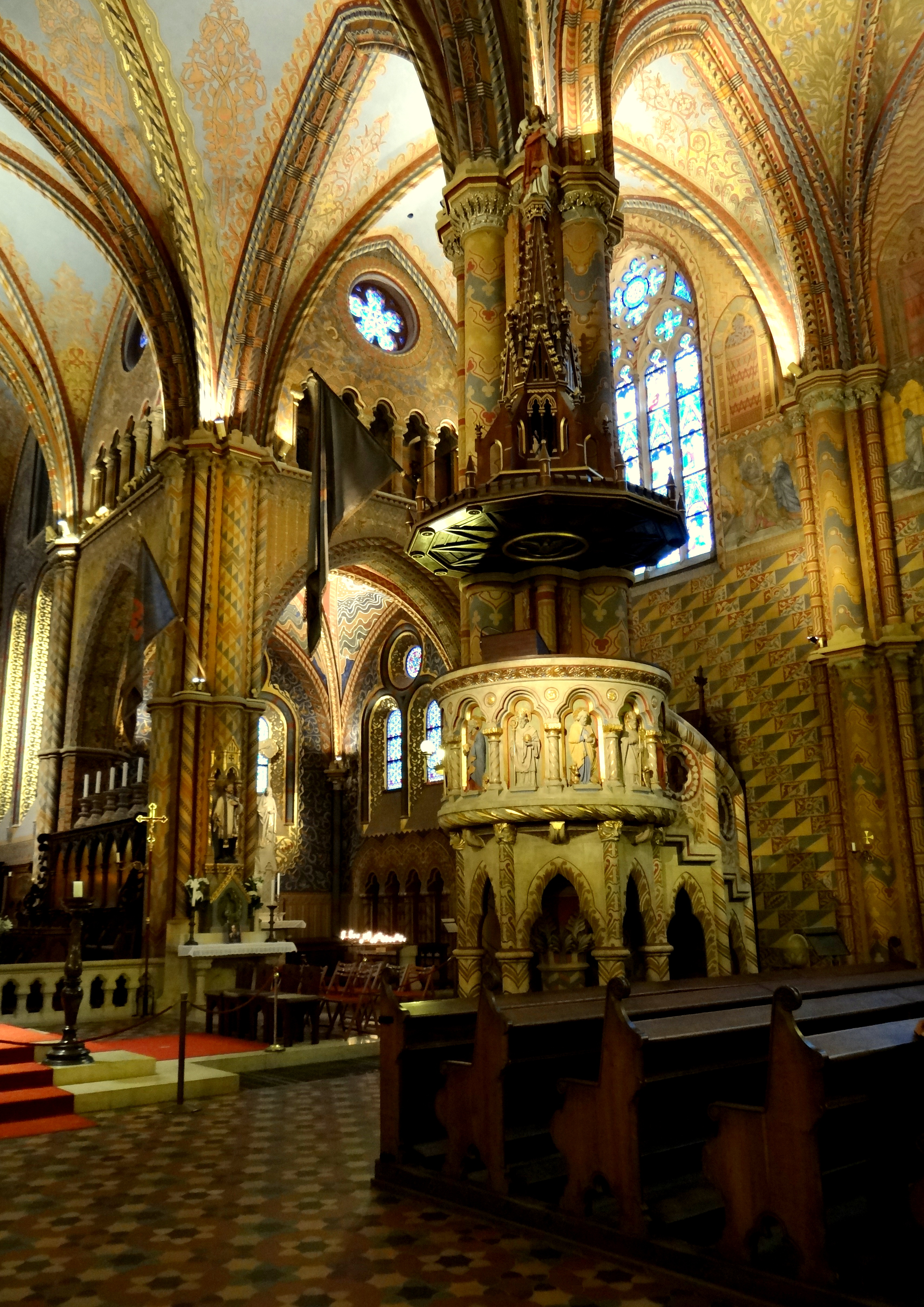
The pulpit was built in medieval style.

The pulpit of the church was built between 1890 and 1893 during the extensive reconstruction of the building. It was designed by Frigyes Schulek with the help of art historian Béla Czobor who contributed to the draft of the iconographic plan. The statues were carved by Ferenc Mikula, the abat-voix was made by Károly Ruprich.

The pulpit was built of sandstone, and the surfaces are entirely covered with Neo-Romanesque ornamental painting including the statues. There is a wrought-iron rail at the bottom of the steps. The Gothic Revival abat-voix, resembling a medieval tower, was carved of oak and the statue of the Good Shepherd on the top was made of linden. The platform of the pulpit is supported by an outer ring of arches and a massive central pillar. The most interesting part of the structure is the sculptural decoration of the parapet with the statues of the four evangelists and the four Latin doctors of the church standing under the arches of a blind arcade. The sequence of the figures is:

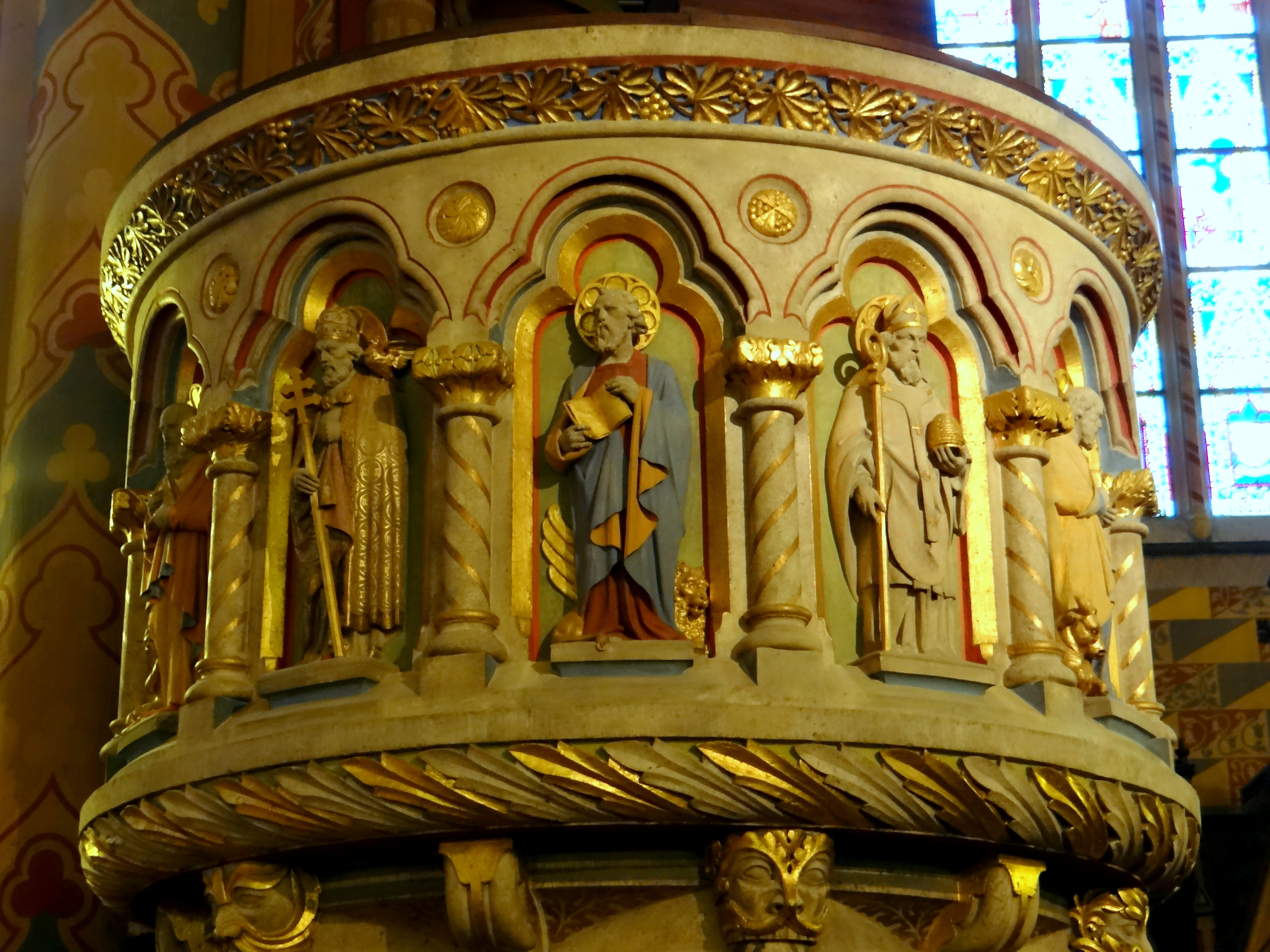
Statues on the parapet.

- St John with the eagle
- St Augustine with the boy
- St Luke with the ox
- St Ambrose with the beehive
- St Mark with the lion
- St Gregory the Great with the dove
- St Matthew with the angel
- St Jerome with the lion

The two bishops and the saintly pope are portrayed in the traditional attire of their office, and Jerome is wearing cardinal robes. The parapet is supported by brackets decorated with grotesque heads in medieval style, and framed by two bands of carved vegetal decoration (vine and acanthus leaves).

Previous pulpits

The first recorded pulpit was erected in 1693 after the reconversion of the building from mosque to church under the ownership of the Jesuits. Nothing is known about its appearance. A new Baroque pulpit was installed in 1769 by Countess Erzsébet Berényi, the owner of the Zichy estate of Óbuda. This was probably made by Károly Bebo, the stewart and sculptor of the estate who made several high-quality Baroque pulpits in the region, including those in the parish church of Óbuda and the Trinitarian church of Kiscell. His work in the Matthias Church was recorded by a lithograph of Gusztáv Zombory (1857) and the only surviving photograph of the interior of the church before its extensive reconstruction.

Bebo's lost work should have been a fine example of Central-European Baroque wood carving. The pulpit itself was decorated with reliefs and two statues of prophets (perhaps Moses and Aaron) and two angels sitting on its ledge. The canopy of the abat-voix was supported by two flying angels. There was a statue of the Risen Christ on the top surrounded with cherubs. The old pulpit was demolished by Frigyes Schulek immediately after the closure of the church in 1876 at the start of the long reconstruction. Only two figures of flying cherubs survived, which were probably parts of the structure, the first one in the Hungarian National Gallery and the other in the collection of the parish church.

== Church bells ==
Today the church has 7 bells. Six of them are located in the bell tower and the last damaged bell hangs in the cavalry tower. Three of the tower's bells are historic bells (from years 1723, 1724 and 1891). The church received four new bells in 2010, and at that time the St. Károly bell sound correction took place.

== Museum ==
It is home to the Ecclesiastical Art Museum, which begins in the medieval crypt and leads up to the St. Stephen Chapel. The gallery contains a number of sacred relics and medieval stone carvings, along with replicas of the Hungarian royal crown and coronation jewels.

== Honors ==
Stamps issued by Hungary; on 24 January 1927, on 26 March 1926 and in 1930.

== Gallery ==
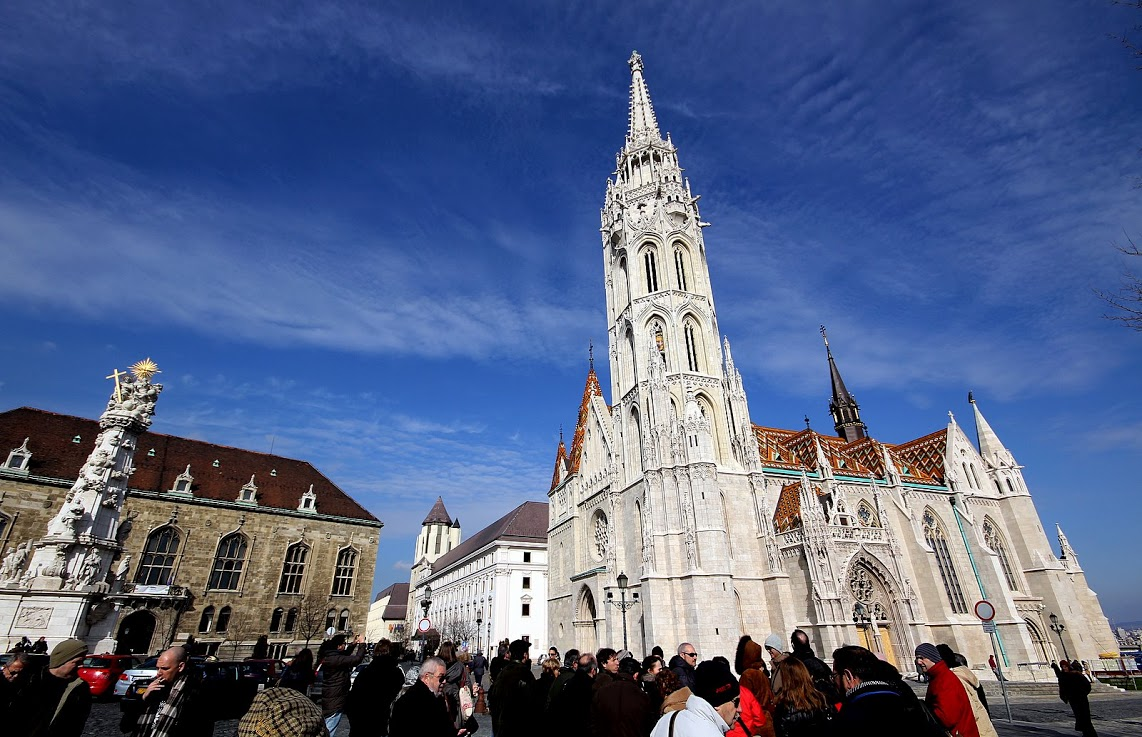
Matthias Church and the Holy Trinity Square

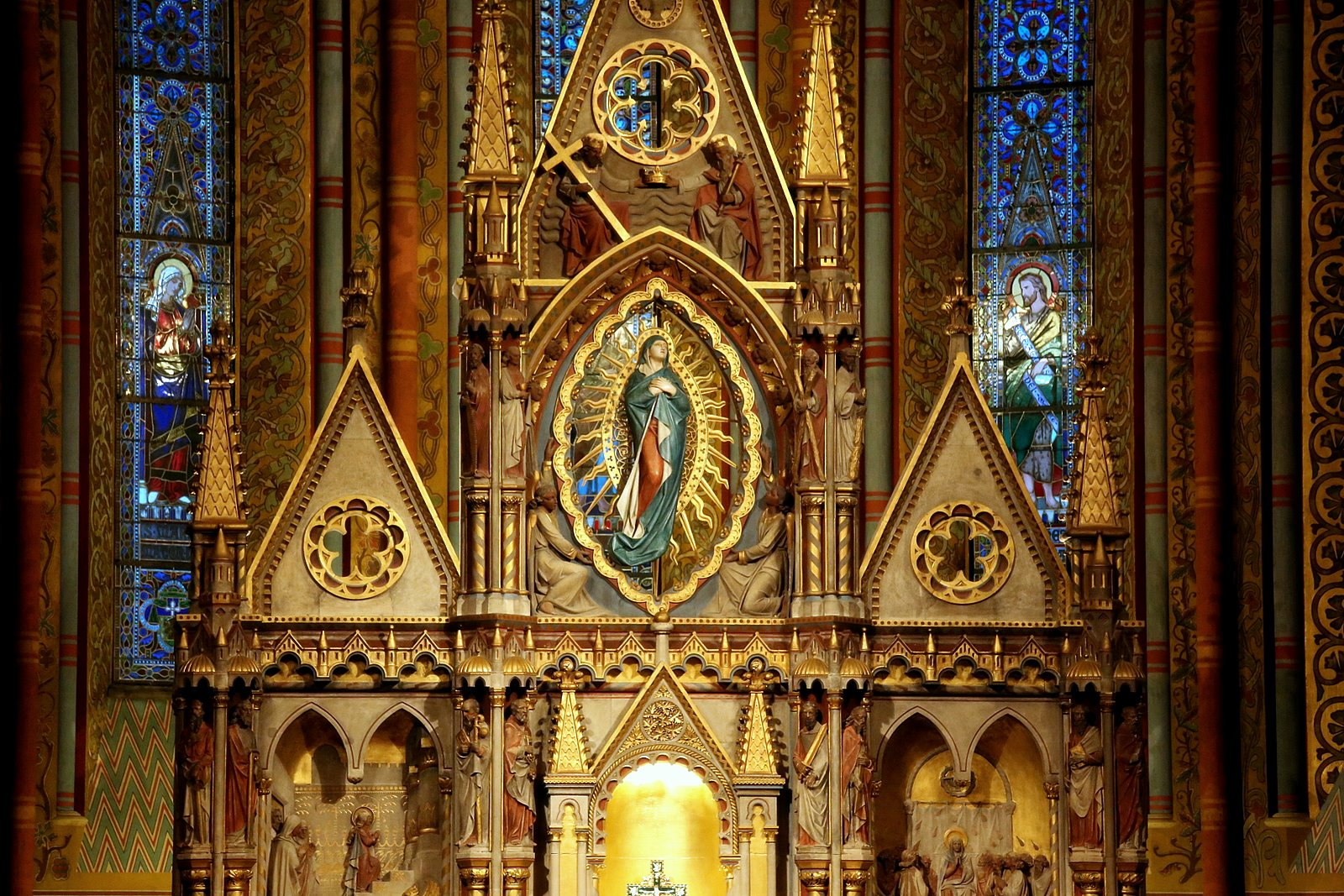
Altarpiece

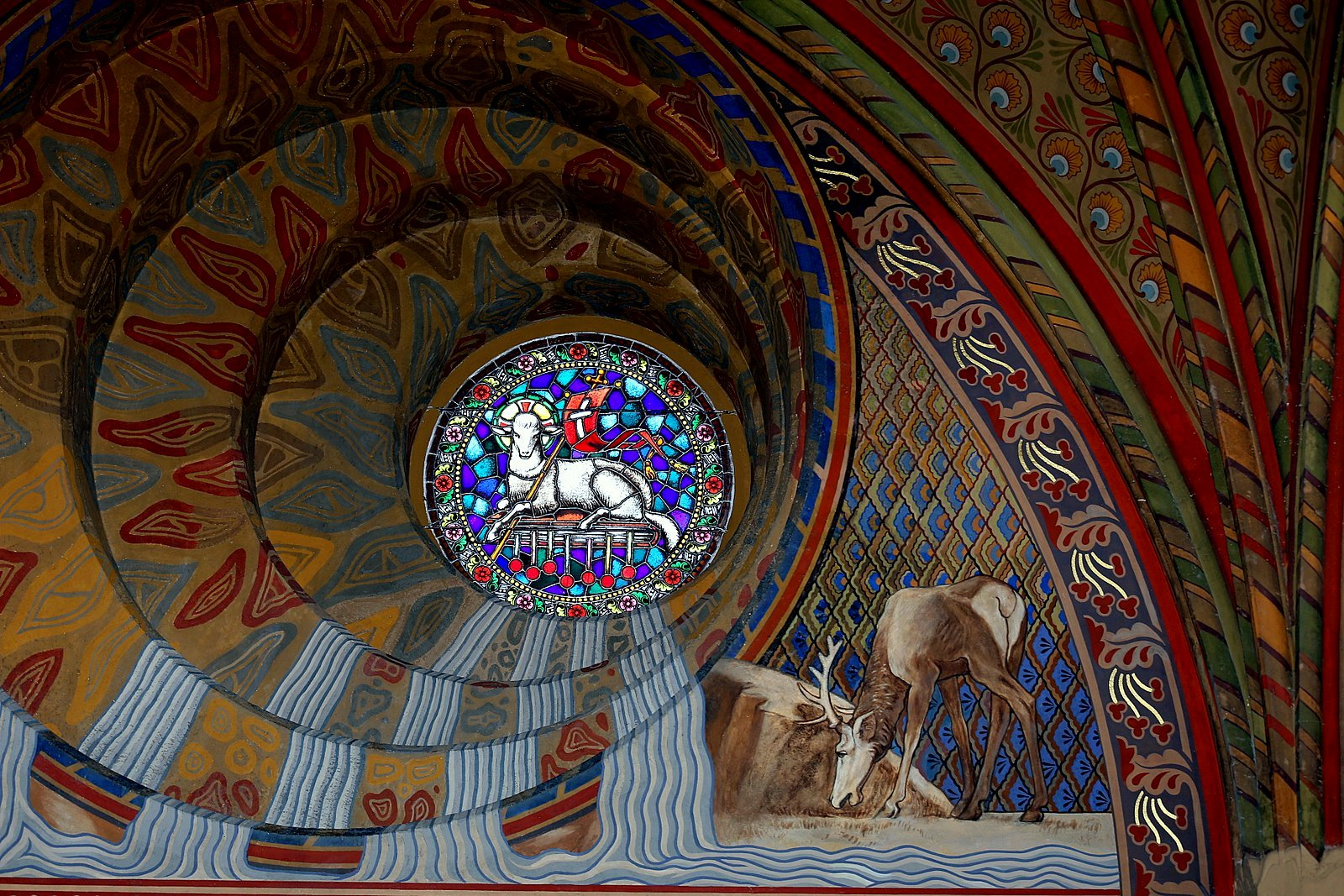
God's Lamb window, below "Like the beautiful believer's stream"

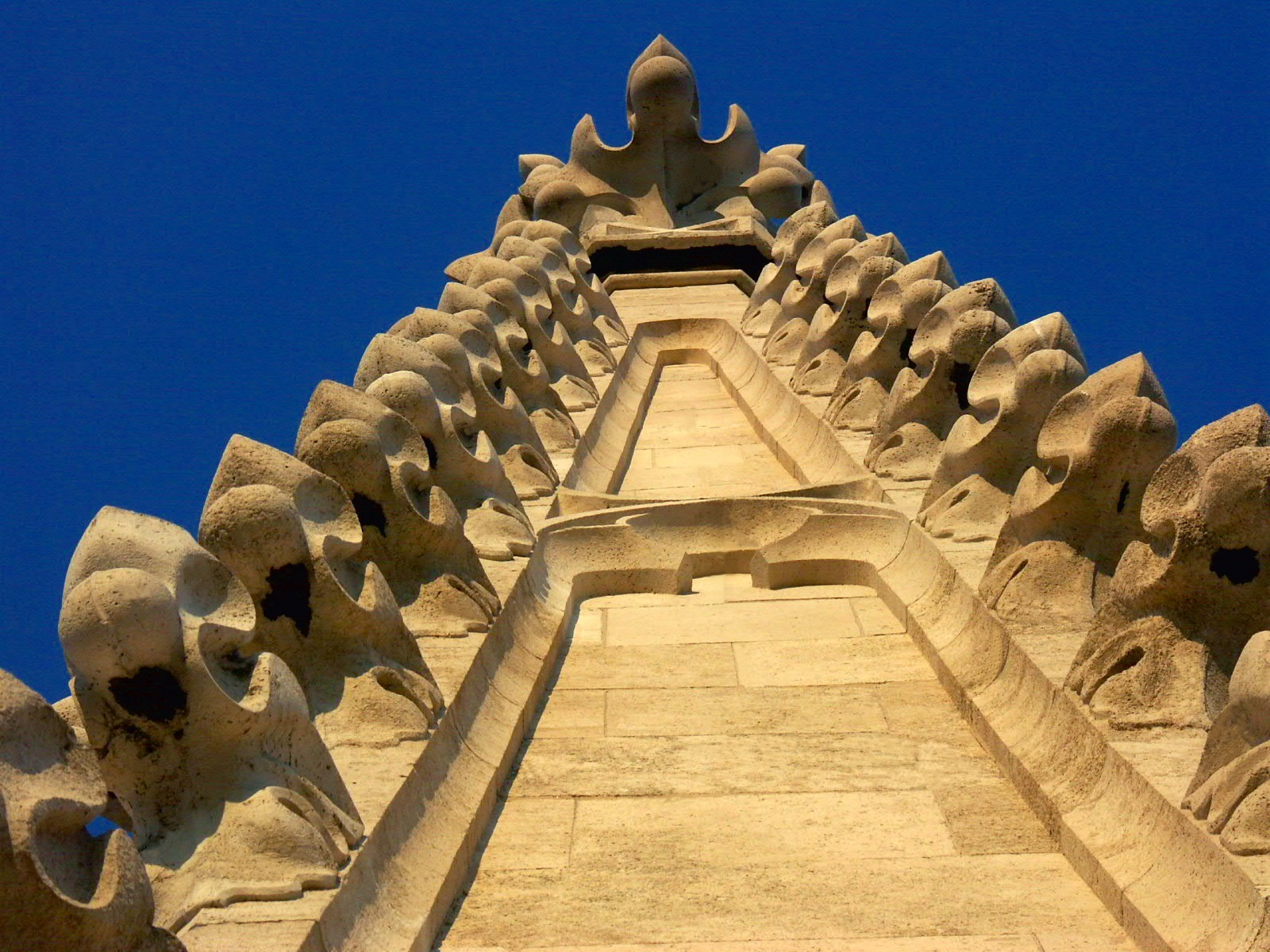
Detail of the tower

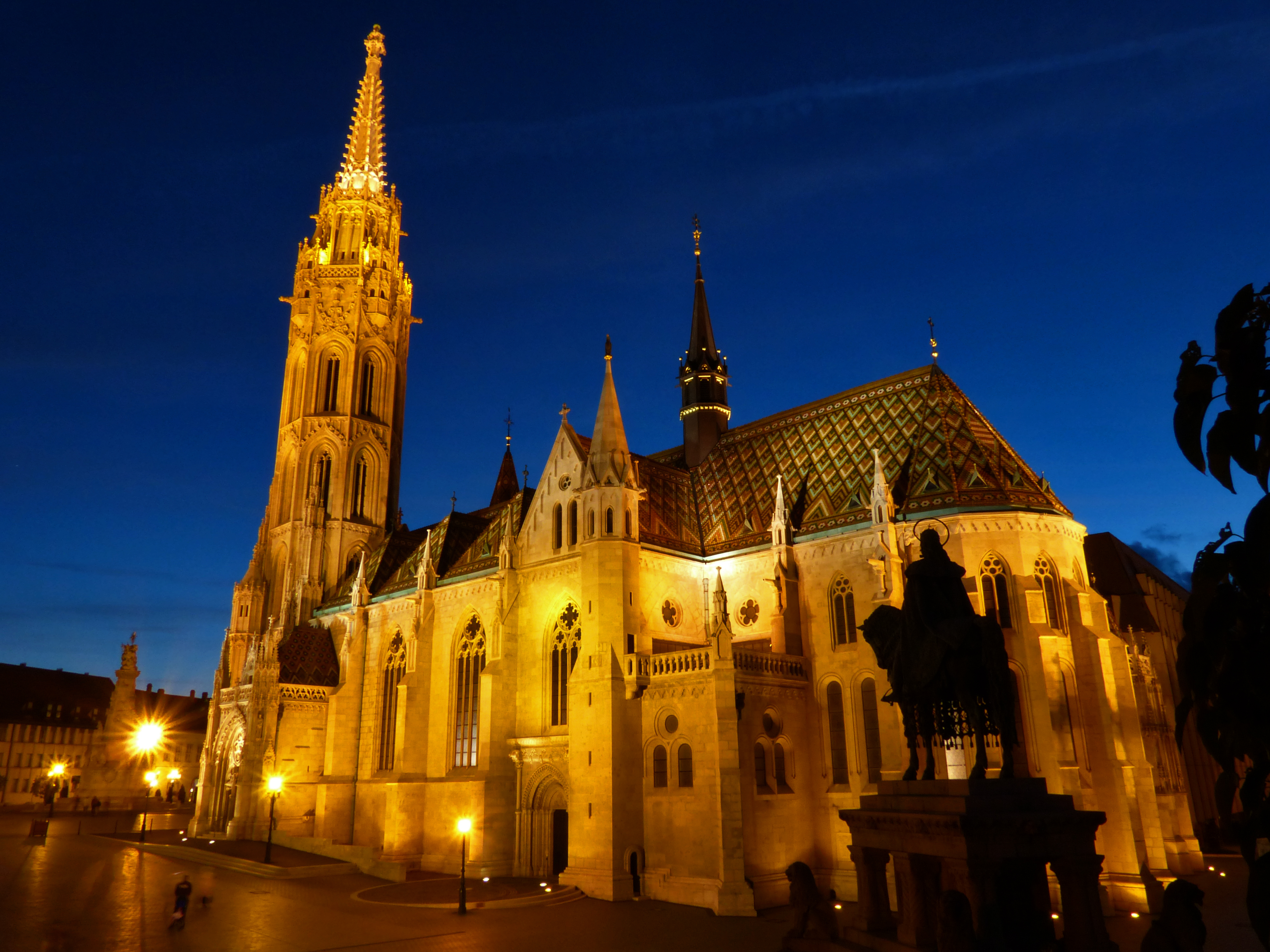
South side in the night

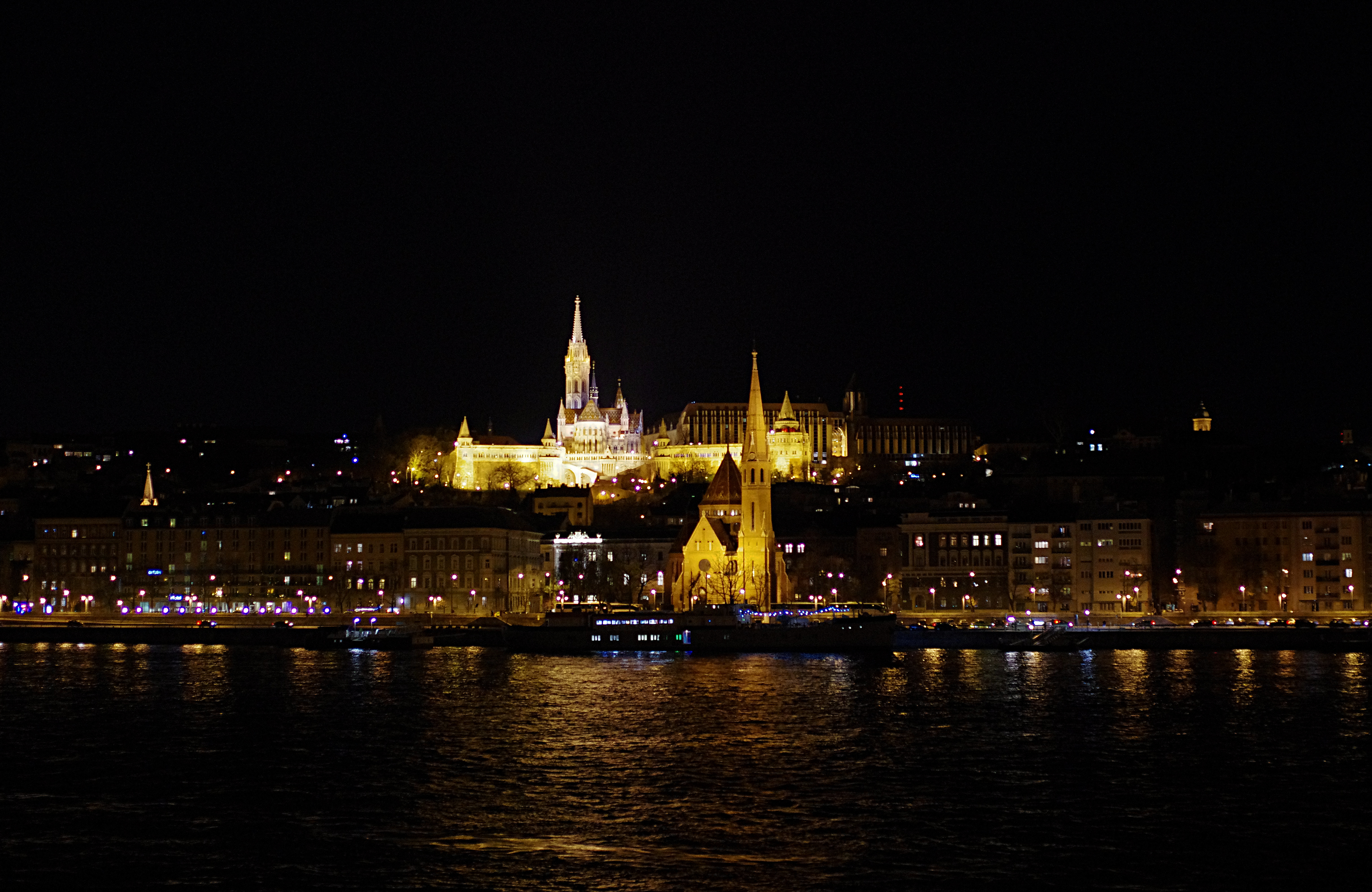
View from Danube in the night

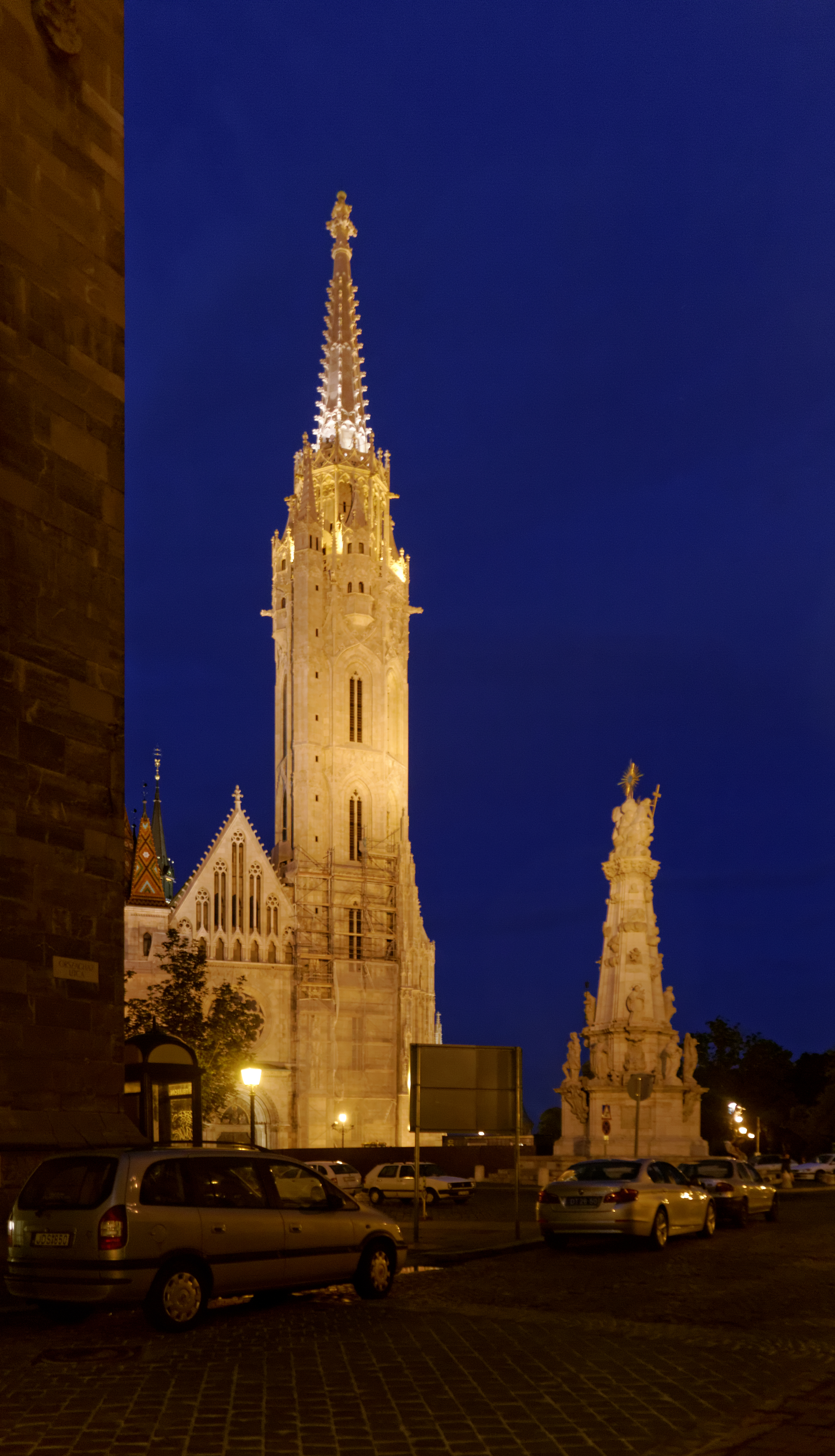
Facade in the night

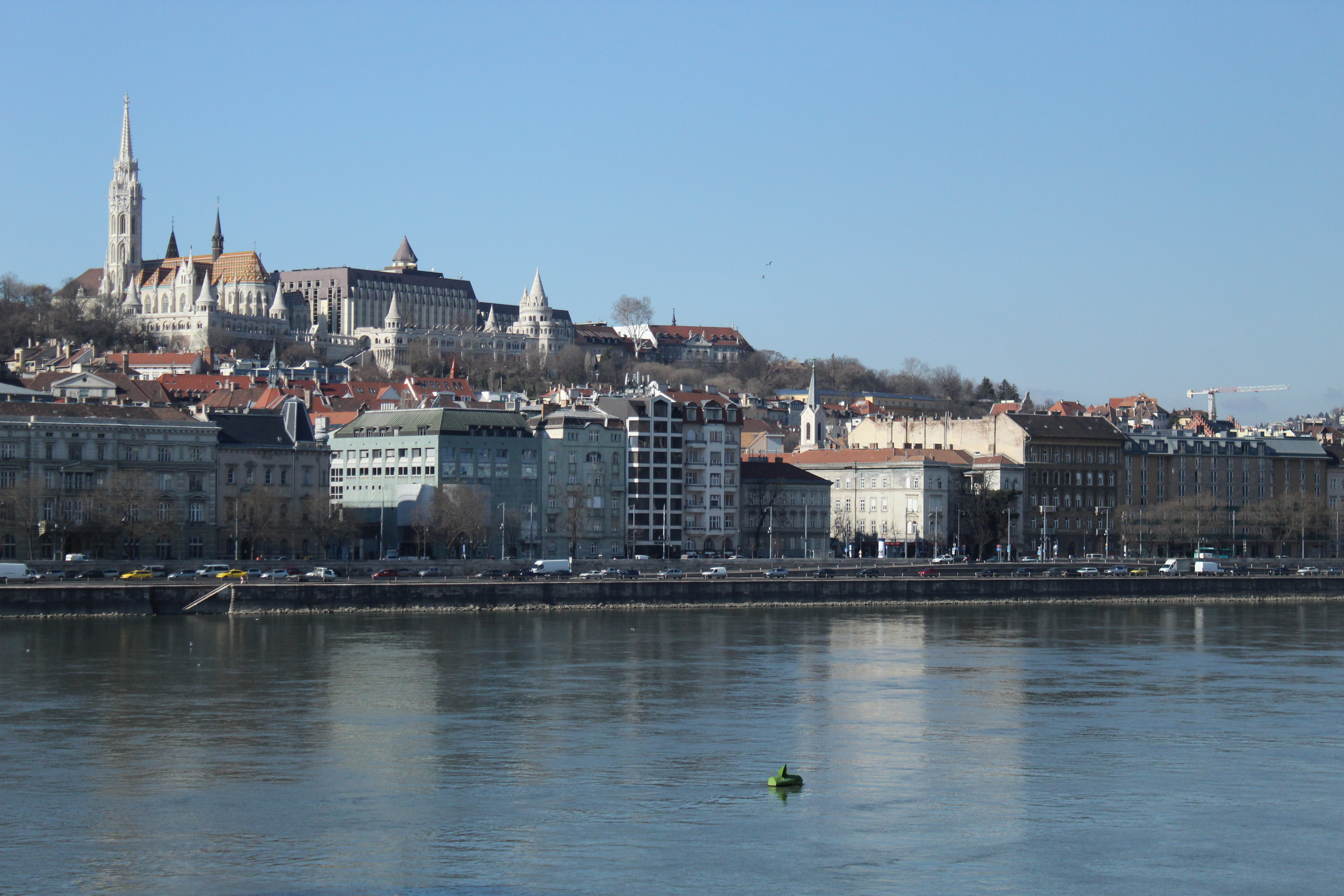
Beautiful view of the Matthias Church

== See also ==
- List of Jesuit sites

== Bibliography ==
- Schneider, Rolf (2004). Manfred Leier (ed.). 100 most beautiful cathedrals of the world: A journey through five continents. trans. from German by Susan Ghanouni and Rae Walter. Edison, New Jersey: Chartwell Books. pp. 104–105.
- József Csemegi: A Budavári Főtemplom (Képzőművészeti Alap Kiadóvállalata, Budapest, 1955)
- Dr. István Czagány: A Hunyadi-ház tagjainak eredeti arcképei a budavári főtemplomban. In: Művészettörténeti Értesítő 1976. 2. ISSN 0027-5247
- Dr. István Czagány – Gink Károly: A budavári Mátyás-templom (Budapest, 1984)
- Géza Entz: A budavári Nagyboldogasszony-templom és a Halászbástya (Corvina, Budapest, 1974) ISBN 963-13-2702-7
- Dr. János Fábián: A budavári Mátyás-templom (Budapest, é. n.)
- M. Marianna Takács: A Budavári Mátyás-templom. A Budapesti M. Kir. Pázmány Péter Tudományegyetem Művészettörténeti és Keresztényrégészeti Intézetének dolgozatai 64. Budapest, 1940
- Balázs Mátéffy: A Koronázó Főtemplom (Corvinus Kiadó, Budapest, 2002)
- Balázs Mátéffy – György Gadányi: Élő Kövek – az ismeretlen Mátyás-templom (Viva Média-Incoronata, Budapest, 2003.) ISBN 963-7619-51-8
- Monumenta Ecclesiæ Strigoniensis. Ordine chron. disposuit, dissertationibus et notis illustravit Dr. Ferdinandus Knauz, Strigonii, Tom. I. 1874, II. 1882, III. 1924
- Dr. Antal Nemes: A Budavári Koronázó Főtemplom (Budapest, 1893)
- Dr. Antal Nemes: Adalékok a Budavári Főtemplom történetéhez (Budapest, 1932)
- Lajos Némethy: A Nagyboldogasszonyról nevezett budapestvári főtemplom történelme (Esztergom, 1876)
- Frigyes Pogány (szerk.): Budapest Műemlékei I. (Akadémiai Kiadó, Budapest, 1955)
