= Imre Steindl =

Hungarian architect (1839–1902)

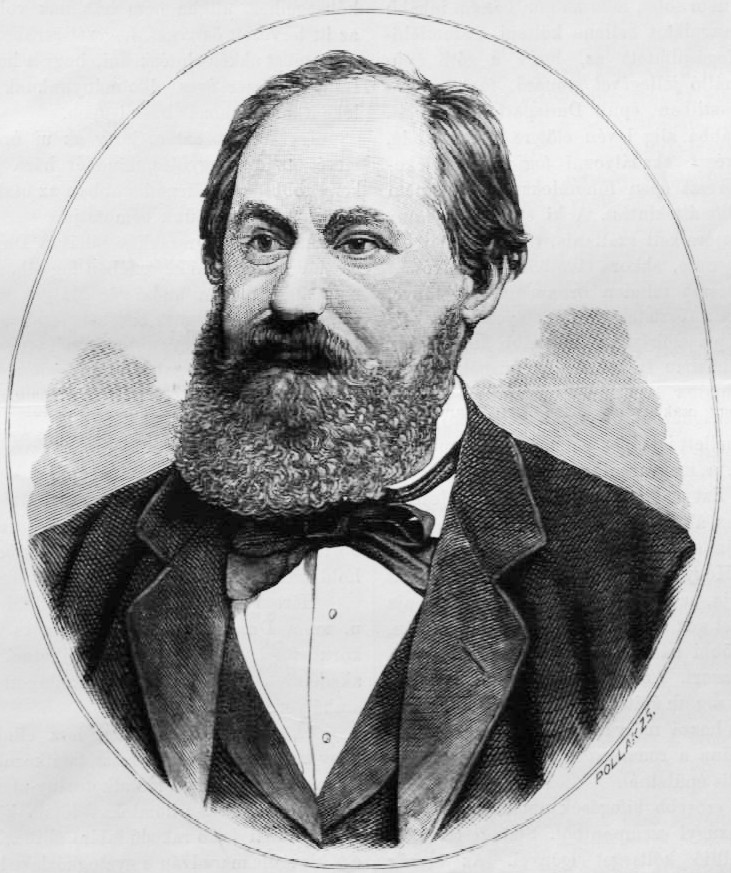
- Imre Steindl (1884)
- Born: Imre Ferenc Károly Steindl; 29 October 1839; Pest, Kingdom of Hungary, Austrian Empire
- Died: 31 August 1902 (aged 62); Budapest, Austria-Hungary
- Other name: Steindl Imre Ferenc Károly
- Education: TU Wien, Vienna; Technical University of Budapest
- Occupation: Architect
- Buildings: Hungarian Parliament Building, Budapest; St Elisabeth Cathedral, Košice

Imre Ferenc Károly Steindl (29 October 1839 – 31 August 1902) was a Hungarian architect.

Steindl (sometimes called in German Emerich Steindl or Emmerich Steindl) was the designer of the Hungarian Parliament Building, an associate professor and correspondent of the Hungarian Academy of Sciences.

Around the end of the 19th century, along with Miklós Ybl and Frigyes Schulek, Steindl was the most significant architect within the lands of the Crown of Saint Stephen. His most famous work, the Hungarian Parliament Building (Országház) in Budapest, is regarded as a symbol of the capital city.

== Biography ==
Steindl graduated from the Technical University of Budapest and the Academy of Fine Arts Vienna. He was a teacher at the Budapest Technical University from 1869. He was elected honorary and corresponding member of the Royal Institute of British Architects in 1891 and was admitted to the Hungarian Academy of Sciences in 1898.

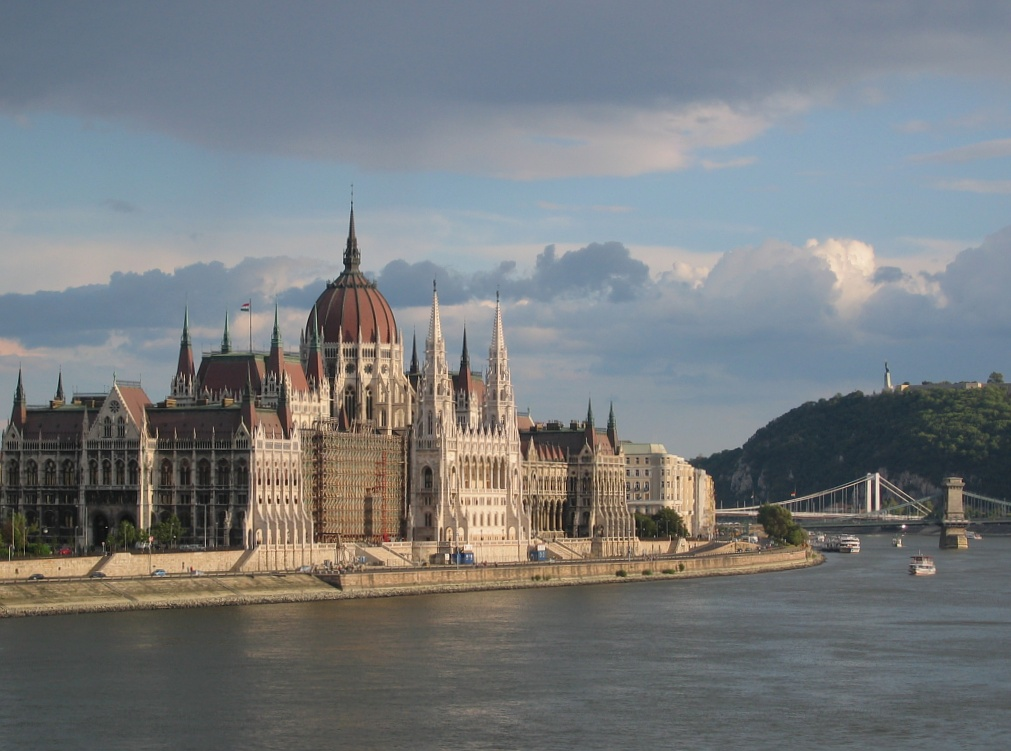
Hungarian Parliament Building in Budapest

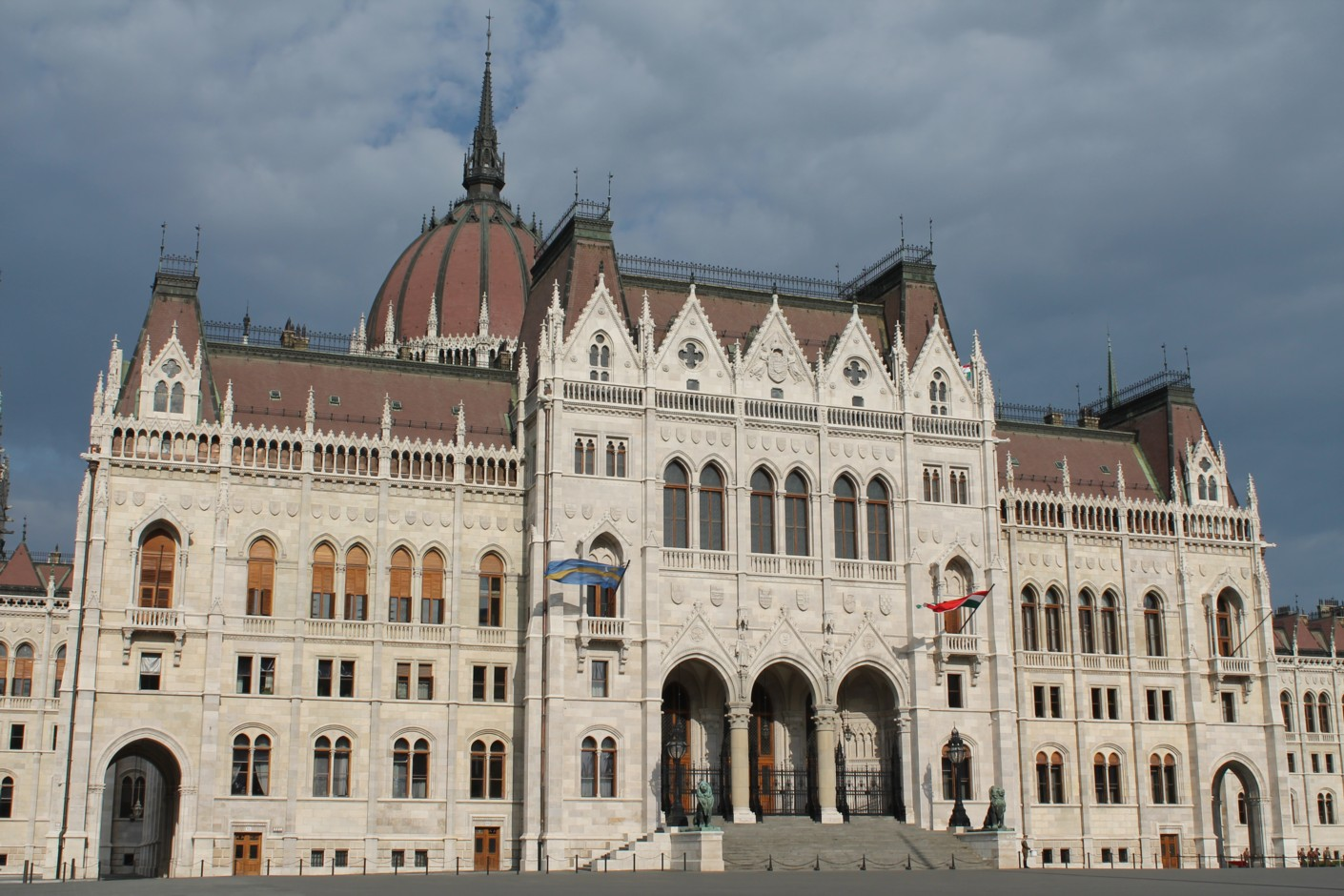
Hungarian Parliament Building in Budapest

His architectural interest was initially romantic historicism, then Renaissance and Gothic style.

He is most famous for the Hungarian Parliament Building, an example of Gothic Revival architecture erected on the Pest bank of the Danube, but his other outstanding works include the St Elisabeth Church in Budapest as well as the reconstruction of the St Elisabeth Cathedral in Košice and the Hunyadi Castle.

Steindl went blind before the completion of the Hungarian Parliament in 1904 and died in 1902 in Budapest. He is buried at Kerepesi Cemetery.

== Main works ==
- New Town Hall, Budapest (1870–1872, Budapest V., Váci u. 62 – 64.)
- Commercial Trade and Industrial Bank (1872)
- Hunyadi Castle restoration (1870–1874) - carried out after the original designer, Ferenc Schulcz's, death
- Franciscan church, Szeged, remodelling (1876)
- St Elisabeth Cathedral, Košice, remodelling
- University Buildings on Múzeum körút, District VIII (1880–1883)
- St Mary of Resurrection, Máriafalva (today Mariasdorf, Burgenland, Austria), reconstruction in Gothic Revival style (1882–1899) with Zsolnay tiled main altar
- St Elizabeth Church, Rózsák tere, Budapest District VII, (1893–1901)
