= Károly Antal =

Hungarian sculptor

- Károly Antal
- Born: June 23, 1909
- Died: 26 May 1994 (aged 84)
- Education: Academy of Fine Arts
- Known for: Sculptor
- Notable work: St Gellért
- Style: Neoclassicism

Károly Antal (23 June 1909 – 26 May 1994, in Budapest) was a twentieth century Hungarian sculptor. His sculptural style reflected neoclassicism style.

Antal studied at the Academy of Fine Arts with István Szentgyörgyi between 1928 and 1937. He received a state scholarship in Rome in 1934–35 and he exhibited several times in Italy.

His early sculptures were characterized by the neoclassicist style of the Roman School. His sculptures "St Gellért" and "Frater Julianus" were erected at the Fishermen's Bastion in Budapest in 1937, and at the Coronation of St Stephen in Esztergom in 1938. After 1945, he created several memorials.

In 1962, he made the sculptural decoration on the facade of the Cathedral of Pécs.
