= Tourism in Hungary =

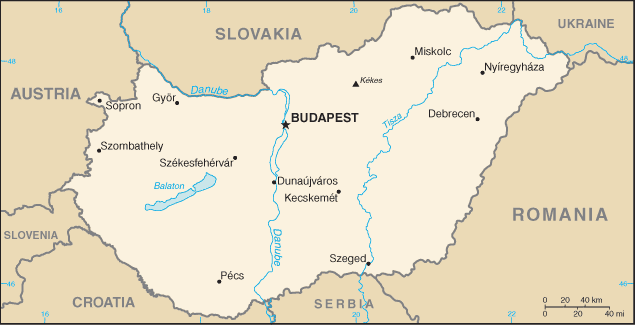
- Map of Hungary
- Country: Hungary
- Time zone: UTC+1 (Central European Time)
- Area code: + 36
- Website: Official Tourist webpage

There is a long history of tourism in Hungary, and Hungary was the world's thirteenth most visited tourist destination country in 2002. Tourism increased by nearly 7 percent between 2004 and 2005. European visitors comprise more than 98 per cent of Hungary's tourists. Austria, Germany, and Slovakia make the largest numbers of visitors to the country. Most tourists arrive by car and stay for a short period of time. Hungary's tourist season is from April through October. July and August are the best tourist months. Budapest is the country's most popular tourist destination.

== Tourism in Budapest ==
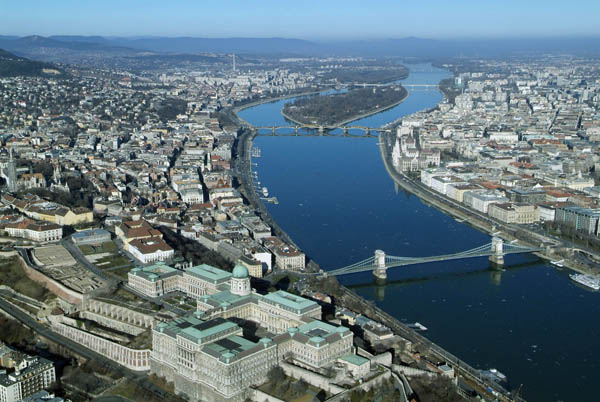
View of Budapest

Budapest became one of Central Europe's most popular tourist attractions in the 1990s. Attractions in the city include Buda Castle which houses several museums including the Hungarian National Gallery, the Matthias Church, the Parliament Building and the City Park. The city has many museums, three opera houses, and thermal baths. Buda Castle, the Danube River embankments and the whole of Andrássy Avenue have been recognized as an UNESCO World Heritage Site.

Hungary has an estimated 1,300 thermal springs, a third of which are used as spas across the country. Hungary's thermal waters and spa culture are promoted to tourists. Only France, Japan, Bulgaria, Iceland, and Italy have similar thermal water capacity. Hungary's thermal baths have been used for 2,000 years for cleansing, relaxation and easing aches and pains. The Romans were the first to use Hungary's thermal waters in the first century, when they built baths on the banks of the Danube River. Budapest lies on a geological fault that separates the Buda hills from plains. More than 30,000 cubic metres of warm to scalding (21° to 76 °C) mineral water gushes from 118 thermal springs and supply the city's thermal baths. Budapest has been a popular spa destination since Roman times. Some of the baths in the city date from Turkish times while others are modern. They have steam rooms that utilize the healing properties of the springs. Most of the baths offer medical treatments, massages, and pedicures. The most famous of Budapest's spas were built at the turn of the 19th century.

There are two hundred known caves under Budapest, some of which can be visited by tourists and are a popular tourist attraction. In the Buda hills there are caves that are unique for having been formed by thermal waters rising up from below, rather than by rainwater. The Pálvölgy Stalactite Cave is a large and spectacular labyrinth. Discovered in the 1900s, it is the largest of the cave systems in the Buda hills. The Szemlohegy Cave has no stalactites and has fewer convoluted and claustrophobic passages than the Pálvölgy Cave. The walls in this cave are encrusted with precipitates formed by warm water dissolving mineral salts. The air in the cave is very clean and its lowest level is used as a respiratory sanatorium. The Matyas Cave in the outskirts of the city has a crawling-room-only section called the "sandwich of death."

== Regional tourism ==
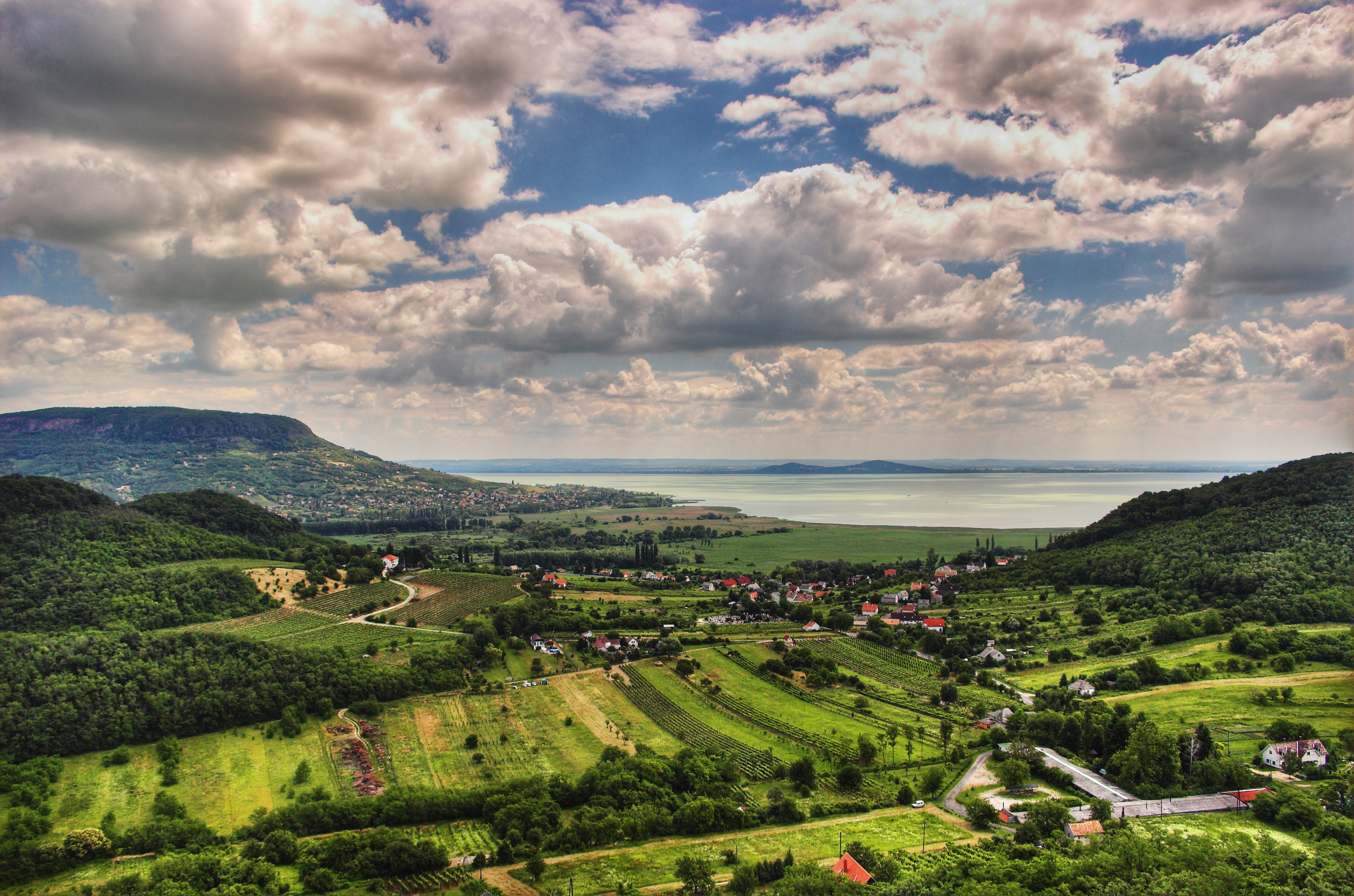
Lake Balaton

Lake Balaton in western Hungary is the largest freshwater lake in Central Europe. It is the second most important tourist destination in Hungary. 2.5 million tourists visited the lake in 1994. Hungary's other tourist attractions include spas, facilities for activity holidays, and cultural attractions such as the villages of the Great Hungarian Plain and the art treasures found in Budapest. Hungary has more than 400 camping grounds. There are more than 2,500 km of dedicated bicycle lanes in the country. Fishing is popular in Hungary and almost half of the country's 130,000 hectares of rivers and lakes are used by anglers. The country has opportunities for birdwatching, and horse riding and hunting are also popular.

== Tourist regions ==
According to the Hungarian Central Statistical Office there were 27 695 465 recorded overnight stays in Hungary during 2016 which is +7.0% change compared to 2015.

Rank	Tourist region	Image	Number of overnight stays (2016)	Share of overnight stays (2016)	Change 2016/2015
1	Budapest and Central Hungary		10 580 125	38.2%	+7.0%
2	Lake Balaton		5 391 597	19.5%	+6.2%
3	Western Transdanubia		3 024 201	10.9%	+5.1%
4	Northern Hungary		2 268 372	8.2%	+5.6%
5	Northern Great Plain		2 090 607	7.5%	+7.5%
6	Southern Great Plain		1 709 755	6.2%	+6.2%
7	Central Transdanubia		1 165 305	4.2%	+15.4%
8	Southern Transdanubia		1 148 375	4.1%	+12.2%
9	Lake Tisza		317 128	1.1%	+2.5%

== Medical tourism ==
During the Goulash Communism era, Germans and Austrian tourists in Hungary also began visiting dentists. As of 2015 Mosonmagyaróvár had about 350 dental clinics, more per capita than anywhere else on Earth. Prices for dental procedures are one third to one half of the price in Vienna, Austria, 60 km (37 mi) away, and one quarter that of Switzerland or Denmark. An Austrian can be treated during a day trip, or also have a vacation in the area for the price of one or two nights in a Vienna hotel.

== Statistics ==
=== Arrivals by country ===
Most visitors staying in Hungary on a short-term basis (not including visitors staying outside commercial accommodation and day trip visitors) are from the following countries of nationality:

Rank	Country	2015	2016
1	Germany	548,173	553,570
2	United Kingdom	351,165	376,573
3	Austria	297,103	319,904
4	Romania	250,750	283,496
5	United States	268,766	275,314
6	Czech Republic	238,455	273,165
7	Poland	245,928	267,257
8	Italy	251,210	258,858
9	Slovakia	169,982	198,061
10	France	163,638	168,136

== See also ==
- UNESCO World Heritage Sites in Hungary
- List of museums in Hungary
- Castles in Hungary
- Protected areas of Hungary
- Transportation in Hungary
- Architecture of Hungary
