= Jacopo Zabolino =

Italian painter

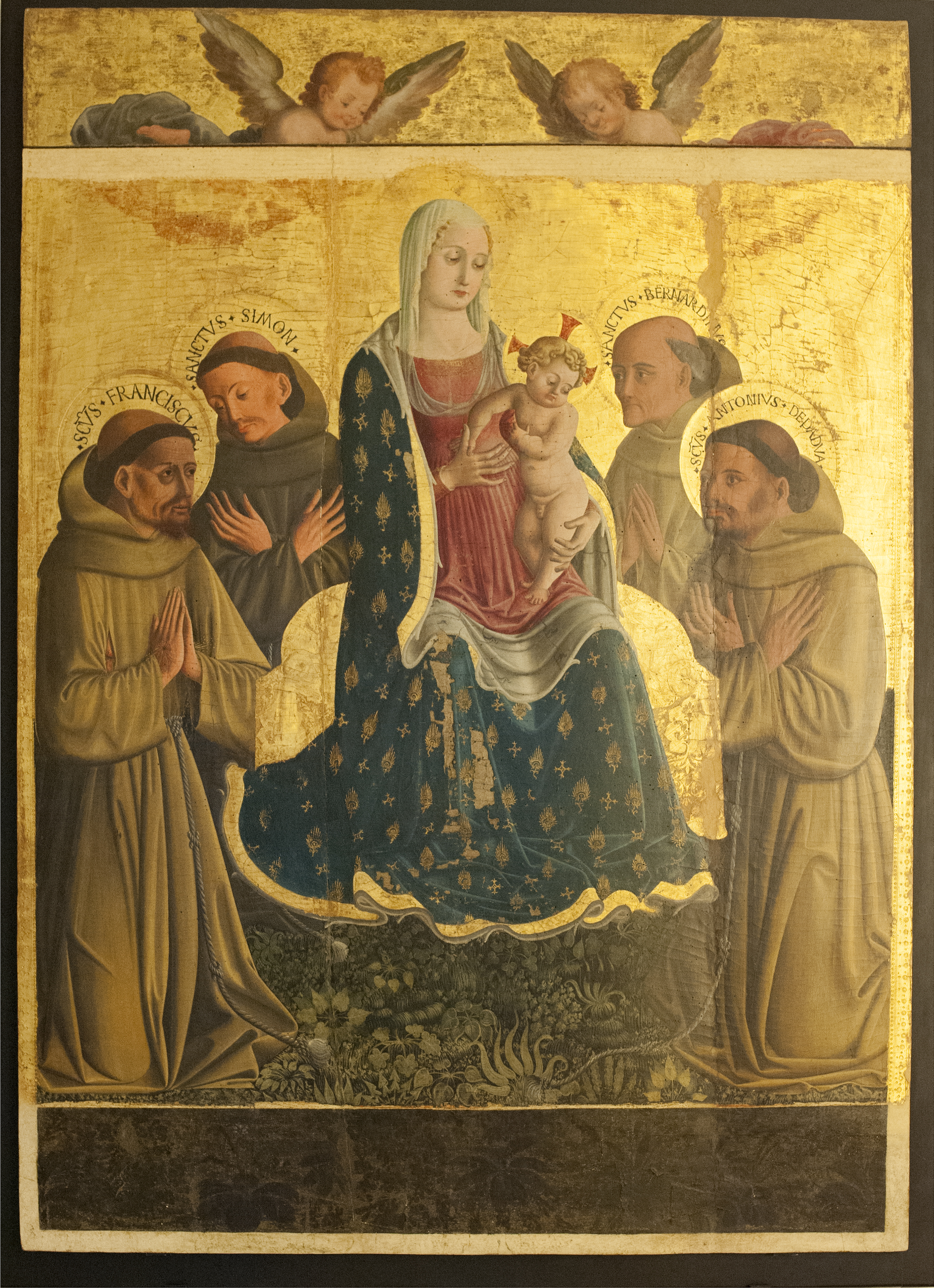
Chiesa di San Simone Spoleto Pala

Jacopo Zabolino or Zabolini, also known by Giacomo Vincioli (active 1461 – 1494) was an Italian painter active in the late 15th century in Spoleto.

He painted frescoes dated 1488 in the church of San Lorenzo at Azzano, near Spoleto. The frescoes at the roadside shrine of the Madonna delle Forche near Castel San Felice have been attributed to him.

Probably his most ambitious work is the detached fresco decoration of the vault of the church of Santa Caterina della Stelletta of Spoleto, which is now on display in the Museum of Fine Arts of Budapest. This includes the six-and-a-half-meter high figure of the Christ Blessing, and the busts of the Four Evangelists on a similar scale.

He appears to have had a number of conflicts for leaving works incomplete.

== Sources ==
- Pagnotta, Laura. “Una chiesa per cinque affreschi.” Bulletin du Musée Hongrois des Beaux-Arts no. 100 (2004), pp. 41–51.
