= List of museums in Hungary =

This is a list of museums in Hungary.

- Aquincum Museum
- Budapest Museum Quarter
- Christian Museum (Hungary)
- Egri Road Beatles Múzeum
- Ethnographic Museum (Budapest)
- Ferenc Hopp Museum Of Asiatic Arts (Budapest)
- Gasmuseum (Budapest)
- Geological Museum (Budapest)
- Greek Orthodox Church and Museum, Miskolc
- House of Terror
- Hungarian Geographical Museum (Érd)
- Hungarian National Gallery
- Hungarian National Museum
- Hungarian Natural History Museum
- Hungarian Railway Museum
- Koller Gallery
- Kunsthalle Budapest
- Memento Park
- Museum of Applied Arts (Budapest)
- Museum of Fine Arts (Budapest)
- Museum of Hungarian Aviation
- Museum of Hungarian Military History
- Museum of Minerals in Siófok
- Ópusztaszer National Heritage Park
- Ottó Herman Museum
- Palace of Arts (Budapest)
- Széchenyi Mansion
- Transport Museum of Budapest
- Vajdahunyad Castle
- Waxworks museum of the Castle of Diósgyőr
- Zelnik István Southeast Asian Gold Museum

== See also ==
- List of museums
- Tourism in Hungary
- Culture of Hungary
