= List of World Heritage Sites in Hungary =

Locations of World Heritage Sites in Hungary

The United Nations Educational, Scientific and Cultural Organization (UNESCO) World Heritage Sites are places of importance to cultural or natural heritage as described in the UNESCO World Heritage Convention, established in 1972. Cultural heritage consists of monuments (such as architectural works, monumental sculptures, or inscriptions), groups of buildings, and sites (including archaeological sites). Natural heritage consists of natural features (physical and biological formations), geological and physiographical formations (including habitats of threatened species of animals and plants), and natural sites which are important from the point of view of science, conservation, or natural beauty. Hungary accepted the convention on 15 July 1985, making its historical sites eligible for inclusion on the list.

As of 2021, there are eight World Heritage Sites in Hungary, seven of which are cultural sites and one, the Caves of Aggtelek Karst and Slovak Karst, is a natural site. The first two sites in Hungary were added to the list at the 11th Session of the World Heritage Committee, held in Paris, France in 1987. One of these two sites was the village of Hollókő, the other was Budapest, the Banks of the Danube with the district of Buda Castle (the latter site was expanded in 2002). The most recent site added to the list is the Tokaj Wine Region Historic Cultural Landscape, listed in 2002. In 2003, all eight sites were renamed to the current names listed below. Two sites are transnational. Fertö / Neusiedlersee Cultural Landscape is shared with Austria and the Caves of Aggtelek Karst and Slovak Karst are shared with Slovakia. In addition, there are ten sites on Hungary's tentative list.

== World Heritage Sites ==
UNESCO lists sites under ten criteria; each entry must meet at least one of the criteria. Criteria i through vi are cultural, and vii through x are natural.

* Transnational site

World Heritage Sites
Site	Image	Location	Year listed	UNESCO data	Description
Budapest, including the Banks of the Danube, the Buda Castle Quarter and Andrássy Avenue	Fisherman's Bastion as seen from the Pest side of the Danube River	Budapest	1987	400bis; ii, iv (cultural)	Budapest was created by the unification of three cities, Buda, Pest, and Óbuda, in the 19th century. The Buda Castle was built in the 13th century by king Béla IV of Hungary. The Castle Quarter features buildings in the Gothic and Baroque styles. Buildings in Pest are in the Historicism and Art Nouveau styles. The Andrássy Avenue, which was added as an extension to the World Heritage Site in 2002, was built in the late 19th century and marked the transformation of Budapest into a modern metropolis. The Millennium Underground Railway that runs under the avenue was the first underground in Continental Europe and has been operational since 1896.
Old Village of Hollókő and its Surroundings	Village houses on both sides of a cobbled road	Nógrád County	1987	401rev; v (cultural)	Hollókő is a traditional village of the Palóc, who are a subgroup of Hungarians. It developed mainly during the 17th and 18th centuries and has been deliberately preserved as a living example of rural life before the agricultural revolution of the 20th century.
Caves of Aggtelek Karst and Slovak Karst*	Inside a cave, dripstone formations and a path for visitors	Northern Hungary	1995	725ter; viii (natural)	The site comprises 712 caves in Hungary and Slovakia. They represent a typical temperate-zone karstic system. The sediments and fossils in the caves show geological records of Late Cretaceous and early Tertiary subtropical and tropical climatic conditions, as well as the Pleistocene glaciations. In 2000, the Dobšiná Ice Cave on the Slovak side was added as an extension to the site. A modification of the site boundaries on the Hungarian side took place in 2008.
Millenary Benedictine Abbey of Pannonhalma and its Natural Environment	Aerial view of the abbey, which is surrounded by forest	Pannonhalma, Győr-Moson-Sopron County	1996	758; iv, vi (cultural)	The Benedictine monks founded the abbey in 996. It had a major role in the diffusion of Christianity in Hungary and Central Europe. The monastery complex has undergone several transformations throughout the centuries. The oldest extant buildings date from the 13th century, with later additions in the Gothic, Baroque, and Romantic styles. The Millenary Monument was built on the central hill in 1896, commemorating the thousandth anniversary of the Hungarian conquest of the land.
Hortobágy National Park – the Puszta	A herd of grey cattle with long horns	Borsod-Abaúj-Zemplén, Heves, Hajdú-Bihar and Jász-Nagykun-Szolnok counties	1999	474rev; iv, v (cultural)	The Hortobágy National Park is a vast area of plains and wetlands in the Great Hungarian Plain. The area has been used by nomadic pastoralists for millennia, with the oldest burial mounds (kurgans) dating to 2000 BCE. At the end of the 9th century CE, the Hungarians arrived in the Carpathian Basin and settled the area, however, the settlements disappeared from the 14th century onwards. In modern times, the area has almost no permanent residents, but it is used for grazing in the summer season. Among the few man-made structures on the plains is the Nine-arched Bridge, which was built in the first half of the 19th century.
Early Christian Necropolis of Pécs (Sopianae)	Preserved foundations of a building	Pécs	2000	853rev, iii, iv (cultural)	The early Christian necropolis of the Roman provincial town of Sopianae, on the site of modern Pécs, was constructed in the 4th century. The tombs were built underground and were richly decorated with Christian-themed murals. Several tombs had memorial chapels erected above the ground.
Fertö / Neusiedlersee Cultural Landscape*	Sunset over the lake	Győr-Moson-Sopron County	2001	772rev; v (cultural)	The Fertö/Neusiedler Lake area has been occupied by different peoples for eight millennia. The original network of towns and villages dates to the 12th and 13th centuries. Several palaces were constructed in the 18th and 19th centuries. The site is shared with Austria.
Tokaj Wine Region Historic Cultural Landscape	Hill with vineyards	Borsod-Abaúj-Zemplén County	2002	1063; iii, v (cultural)	Tokaj Wine Region is located in the hills of north eastern Hungary. It was formally established in 1737 by Charles VI, Holy Roman Emperor, though the documented wine production dates to 1561. It is a cultural landscape linked to the production of the Tokaji wines, with vineyards, farms, villages, small towns, and wine cellars.

== Tentative list ==
In addition to sites inscribed on the World Heritage list, member states can maintain a list of tentative sites that they may consider for nomination. Nominations for the World Heritage list are only accepted if the site was previously listed on the tentative list. As of 2021, Hungary recorded ten sites on its tentative list.

Tentative World Heritage Sites
Site	Image	Location	Year listed	UNESCO criteria	Description
The medieval castle-fort of Esztergom	Church and fortifications on a hill	Komárom-Esztergom County	1993	(cultural)	The medieval castle-fort of Esztergom, built in the 10th and 11th centuries, was the royal seat until 1249. It is the symbol of Hungarian Christianity. It was enlarged in the early Gothic style and later hosted Renaissance artists.
Caves of the Buda Thermal Karst System		Budapest	1993	viii (natural)	Six caves under the hill of Buda that are the source of thermal water. The Jozsef-hegy "crystal" cave features one of the largest hydrothermal chambers in the world.
State Stud-Farm Estate of Mezőhegyes	Black horse of Nonius breed	Békés County	2000	iii, iv (cultural)	The stud farm was established by Emperor Joseph II in 1784. It is a large scale farm which focuses on three horse breeds: Nonius, Gidran, and the Furioso-North Star. Most of the architectural features at the farm date to the late 18th century.
The Ipolytarnóc Fossils	Entrance to the museum in shape of a tree trunk	Nógrád County	2000	vii, viii (natural)	The fossil site was first scientifically studied in 1836. It contains the remains of a shallow sea from late Oligocene and early Miocene. The sediments were covered by volcanic rocks 19 million years ago, which helped to preserve them. Shark teeth, leaf impressions, and petrified trees are among the most important fossils of the site.
System of Fortifications at the Confluence of the Rivers Danube and Váh in Komárno – Komárom*	Fortress wall with a gate	Komárom-Esztergom County	2007	i, ii, iv, v (cultural)	The cities of Komárno in Slovakia and Komárom in Hungary are located at the confluence of Danube and Váh rivers. Due to the strategic location, a fortification system has been developed around the area through centuries. The Hungarian part of the site comprises three forts from the late 19th century, Fort Monostor, Fort Csillag, and Fort Igmandi.
Ödön Lechner's independent pre-modern architecture	Museum of Applied Arts building with decorated facade and roof	Budapest, Bács-Kiskun County	2008	i, ii, iii, iv (cultural)	This nomination comprises five buildings of Hungarian architect Ödön Lechner, who developed a unique artistic expression by combining Hungarian styles and Eastern ornamentation. He was active in the late 19th and early 20th century. The Museum of Applied Arts in Budapest is pictured.
The Network of Rural Heritage Buildings in Hungary		several sites	2017	ii, iii, vi (cultural)	The Hungarian Network of Country Houses was founded in the mid-20th century. It is an ensemble of authentic folk buildings mostly from the 18th to the 20th century and includes several hundreds of houses across the country.
Royal Seats in Esztergom, Visegrád with the former Royal Wood in the Pilis Mountain	Visegrád castle from above	Pest County, Komárom-Esztergom County	2017	ii, iii, iv, v (cultural)	The royal castle in Esztergom (the royal seat until 1249) and the Visegrád palace (the royal seat from 1323 to the 1410s) were influenced by art from Italy and France, from the late Gothic to the Renaissance. The Royal Wood was the hunting area and features the remains of royal mansions and monasteries.
Wooden bell-towers in the Upper Tisza-Region	Wooden bell-tower right of a church with a white facade	Szabolcs-Szatmár-Bereg County	2017	ii, iii, iv (cultural)	This nomination comprises seven wooden bell-towers that were built in the 17th and 18th centuries. The wood was used as a building material since the area was impoverished during the Ottoman rule and because Christian congregations that were driven out of their earlier churches during the Reformation and Counter-Reformation and needed new places of worship. The adjacent wooden churches have been later either rebuilt in stone or moved to an outdoor village museum. The tower in Nyírbátor, built around 1640, is pictured.
Balaton Uplands Cultural Landscape	Mainson and the park from above	Veszprém County, Zala County	2017	iv, v, vii (mixed)	This nomination covers natural and cultural sites around Lake Balaton: Tihany Peninsula, the Tapolca Basin, the Káli Basin, Lake Hévíz, the Festetics Palace of Keszthely (pictured), Georgikon Farm, and the historic quarter of Balatonfüred. A part of the tentative site is protected as the Balaton Uplands National Park.

== See also ==
- Tourism in Hungary
