= The Christ Child Distributing Bread to Pilgrims =

Painting by Bartolomé Esteban Murillo

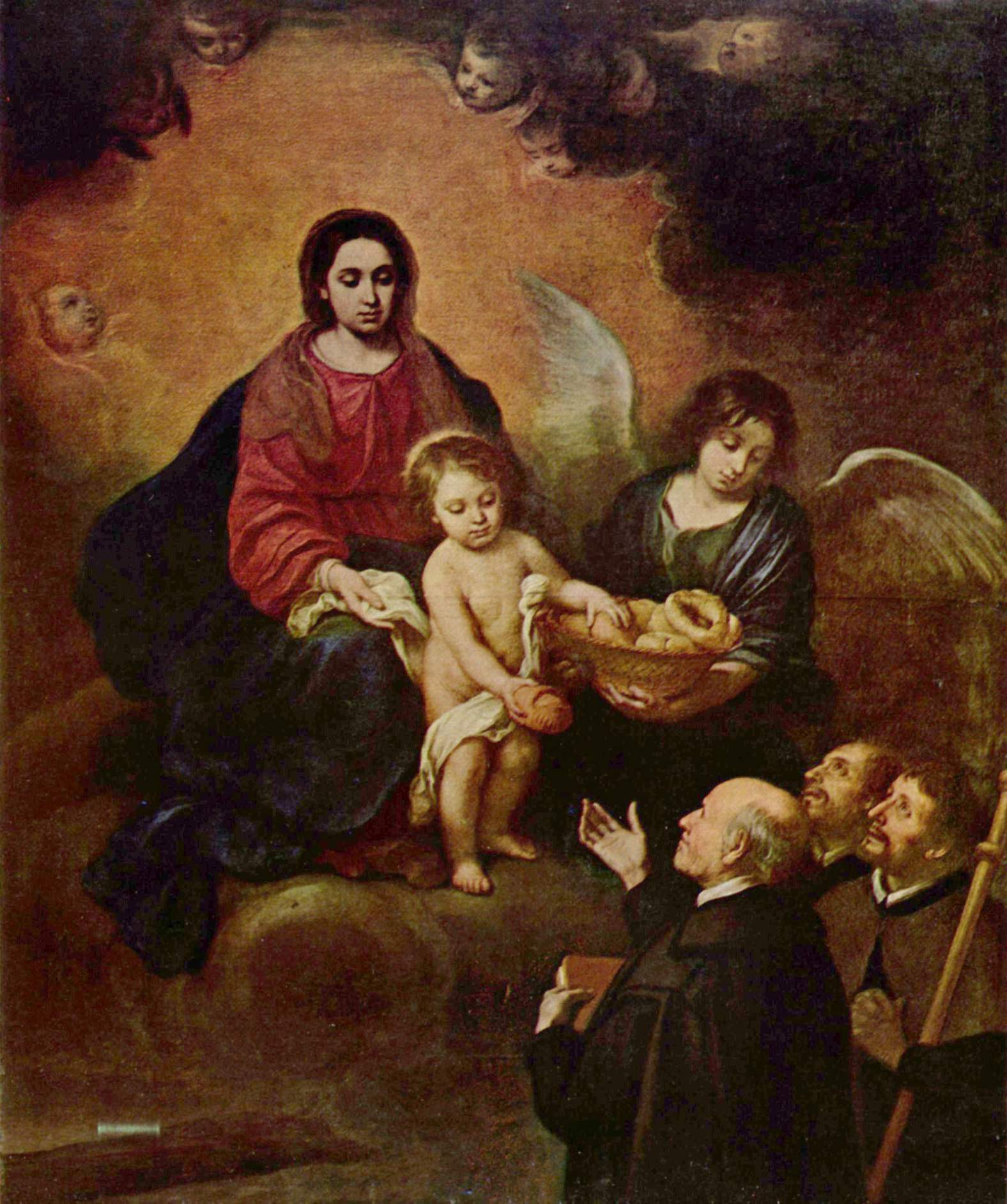
- Artist: Bartolomé Esteban Murillo
- Year: 1678
- Medium: oil on canvas
- Dimensions: 219 cm × 182 cm (86 in × 72 in)
- Location: Museum of Fine Arts, Budapest

The Christ Child Distributing Bread to Pilgrims is an oil on canvas painting by Spanish artist Bartolomé Esteban Murillo, from 1678. It is held in the Museum of Fine Arts, in Budapest.

== Description ==
The Christ Child is positioned in the center of the painting; to His right, a winged angel holds a basket of loaves, which the Child piously distributes to pilgrims, one of whom, shown with a book, is believed to be a portrait of the canon Justino de Neve. Mary is seated behind the Child, watching her son; the faces of cherubs are visible above. The light illuminating the faces and parts of the figures is remarkable.
