= Museum of Fine Arts (Budapest) =

Art museum in Budapest, Hungary

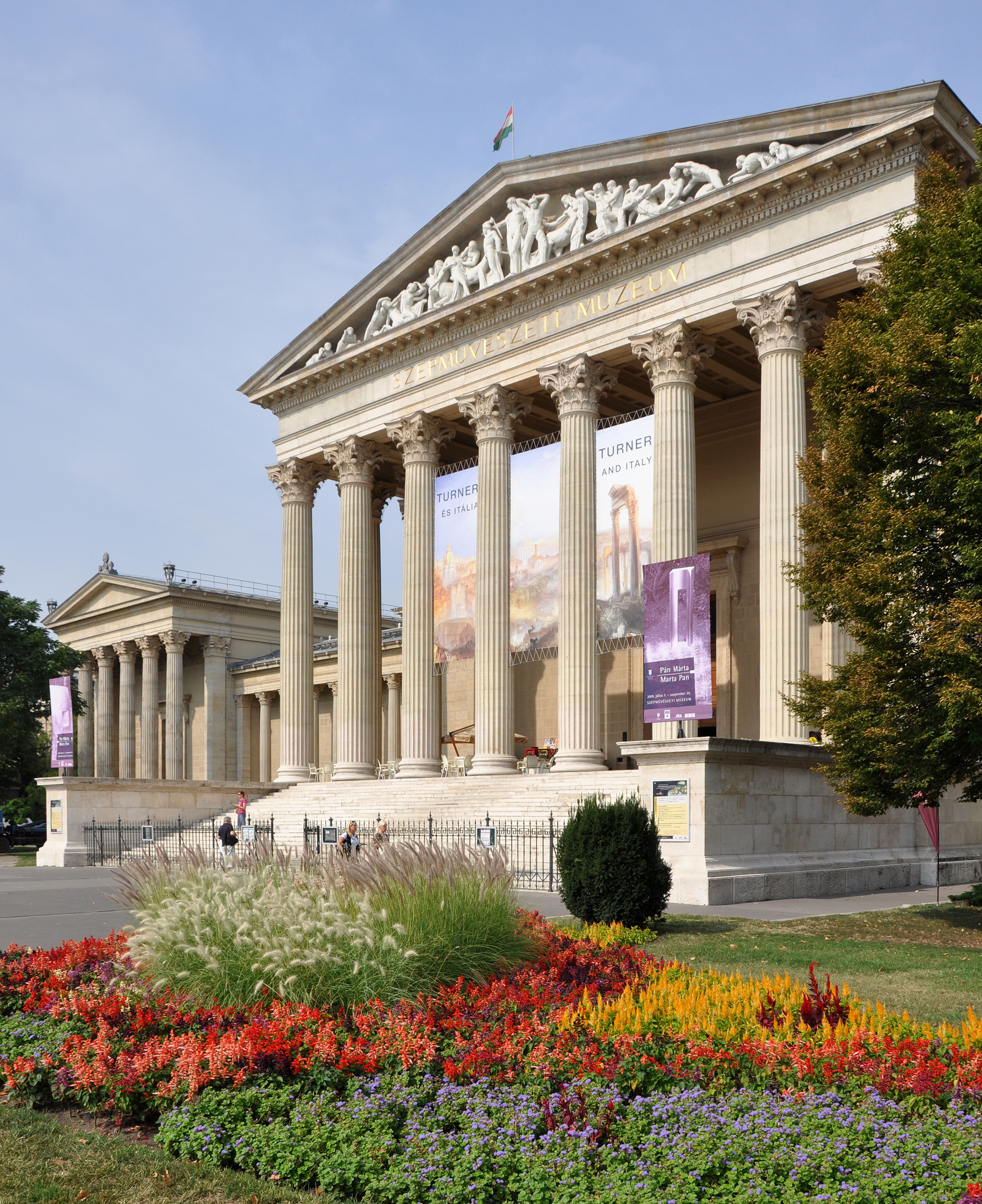
- Interactive fullscreen map
- Established: 1906
- Location: Heroes' Square, Budapest
- Coordinates: 47°30′57″N 19°04′36″E
- Type: Art museum
- Collection size: 100,000
- Director: László Baán
- Architects: Albert Schickedanz and Fülöp Herzog
- Website: www.szepmuveszeti.hu

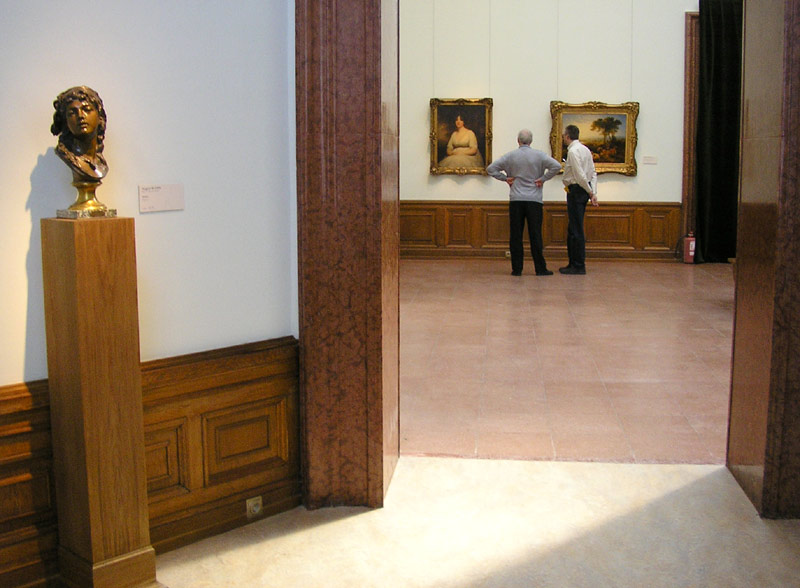
Old Paintings gallery

The Museum of Fine Arts (Hungarian: Szépművészeti Múzeum, pronounced [ˈseːpmyveːsɛti ˈmuːzɛum]) is a museum in Heroes' Square, Budapest, Hungary, facing the Hall of Art.

It was built by the plans of Albert Schickedanz and Fülöp Herzog in an eclectic-neoclassical style , between 1900 and 1906. The museum's collection is made up of international art (other than Hungarian), including all periods of European art, and comprises more than 100,000 pieces. The collection is made up of older additions such as those from Buda Castle, the Esterházy and Zichy estates, as well as donations from individual collectors. The Museum's collection is made up of six departments: Egyptian, Antique, Old sculpture gallery, Old master paintings gallery, Modern collection, Graphics collection. The institution celebrated its centenary in 2006.

== Collections and exhibits ==
=== Collection of Egyptian Antiquities ===
The Museum of Fine Arts in Budapest holds one of the largest collection of Ancient Egyptian art in Central‑Eastern Europe, consisting of approximately 3,500 artefacts. It comprises a number of collections bought together by Hungarian Egyptologist, Eduard Mahler, in the 1930s. Subsequent digs in Egypt have expanded the collection. Some of the most interesting pieces are the painted mummy sarcophagi.

=== Classical antiquities ===
The core of the collection was made up of pieces acquired from Paul Arndt, a classicist from Munich. The exhibition mainly includes works from Ancient Greece and Rome. Most significant is the 3rd century marble statue called the Budapest dancer. The Cyprean and Mycenaean collection is also notable, also the ceramics and bronzes.

=== Old master paintings (13th to 18th centuries) ===
The 3000 paintings in the collection offer an almost uninterrupted survey of the development of European painting from the 13th to the late 18th centuries. The core of the collection is constituted by the 700 paintings acquired from the Esterhazy estate. The collection is split up into Italian, German, Dutch, Flemish, French, English and Spanish art. The most important works include Maso di Banco's Coronation of the Virgin, Sassetta's Saint Thomas Aquinas at Prayer, Domenico Ghirlandaio's Saint Stephen Martyr, Bernardo Bellotto's The Piazza della Signoria in Florence, Gentile Bellini's Portrait of Caterina Cornaro, Giorgione's Portrait of a Young Man, Raphael's Esterhazy Madonna, Giambattista Pittoni's St Elizabeth Distributing Alms, three works by Corrado Giaquinto, Allegory of Painting, The Angel Annunciant and Moses receiving the Laws, Correggio's Madonna and Child with an Angel, three works by Sebastiano del Piombo, Bronzino's Adoration of the Shepherds as well as his Venus, Cupid and Jealousy, Romanino's Doge Agostino Barbarigo Handing over a Banner to Niccolo Orsini, Titian's Portrait of Doge Marcantonio Trevisani, Tintoretto's Supper at Emmaus, Tiepolo's St James the Greater in the Battle of Clavijo, Dürer's Portrait of a Young Man, Bernard van Orley's Portrait of Emperor Charles V, eight pictures by Lucas Cranach the Elder, Pieter Bruegel the Elder's St John the Baptist Preaching, Rubens's Mucius Scaevola Before Porsenna, Murillo's The Christ Child Distributing Bread to Pilgrims, Maarten van Heemskerck's Lamentation, two portraits by Frans Hals, and a collection of works by Spanish masters including El Greco, Velázquez, and Goya.

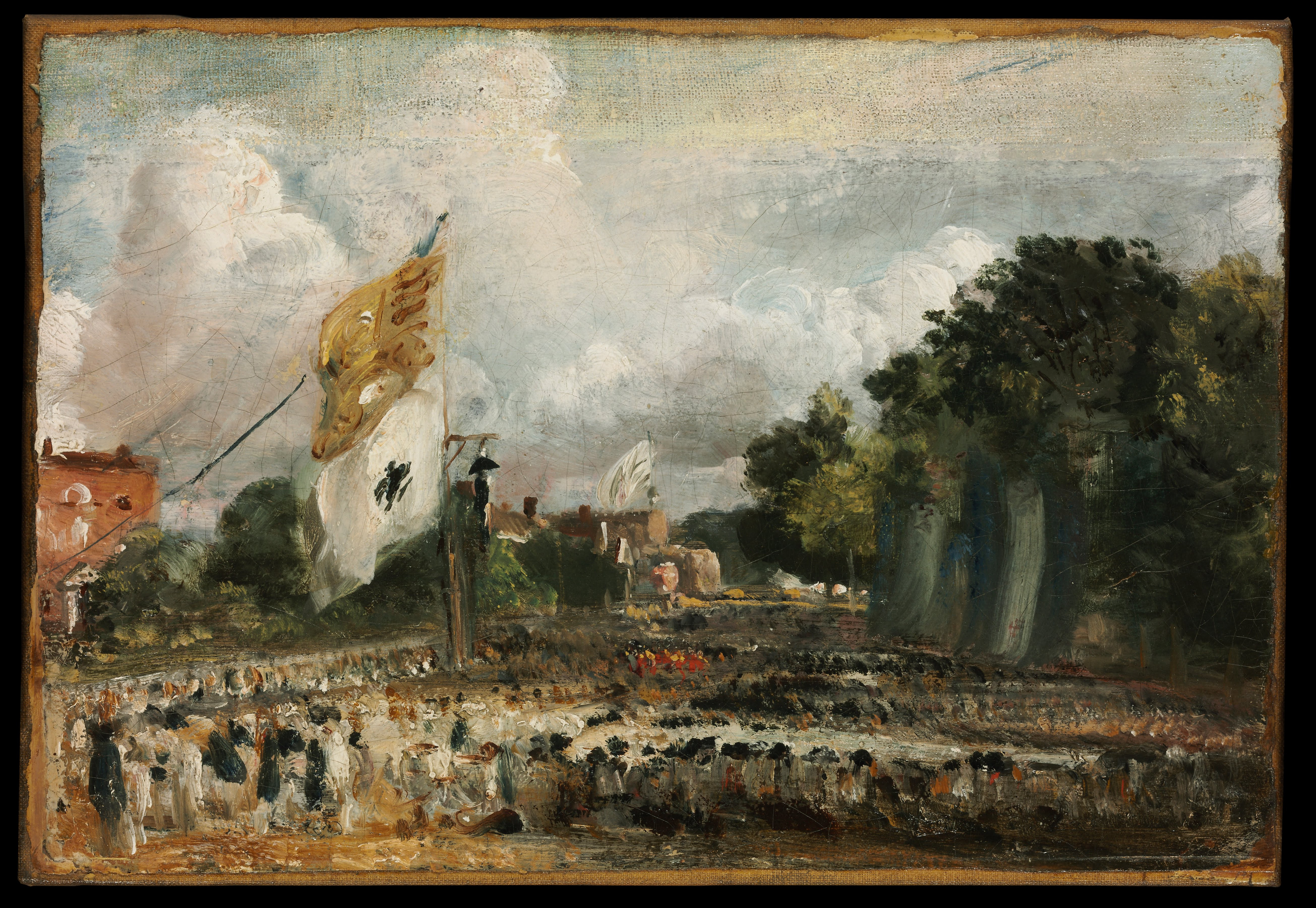
The Celebration of the Peace of 1814 – John Constable (1814)

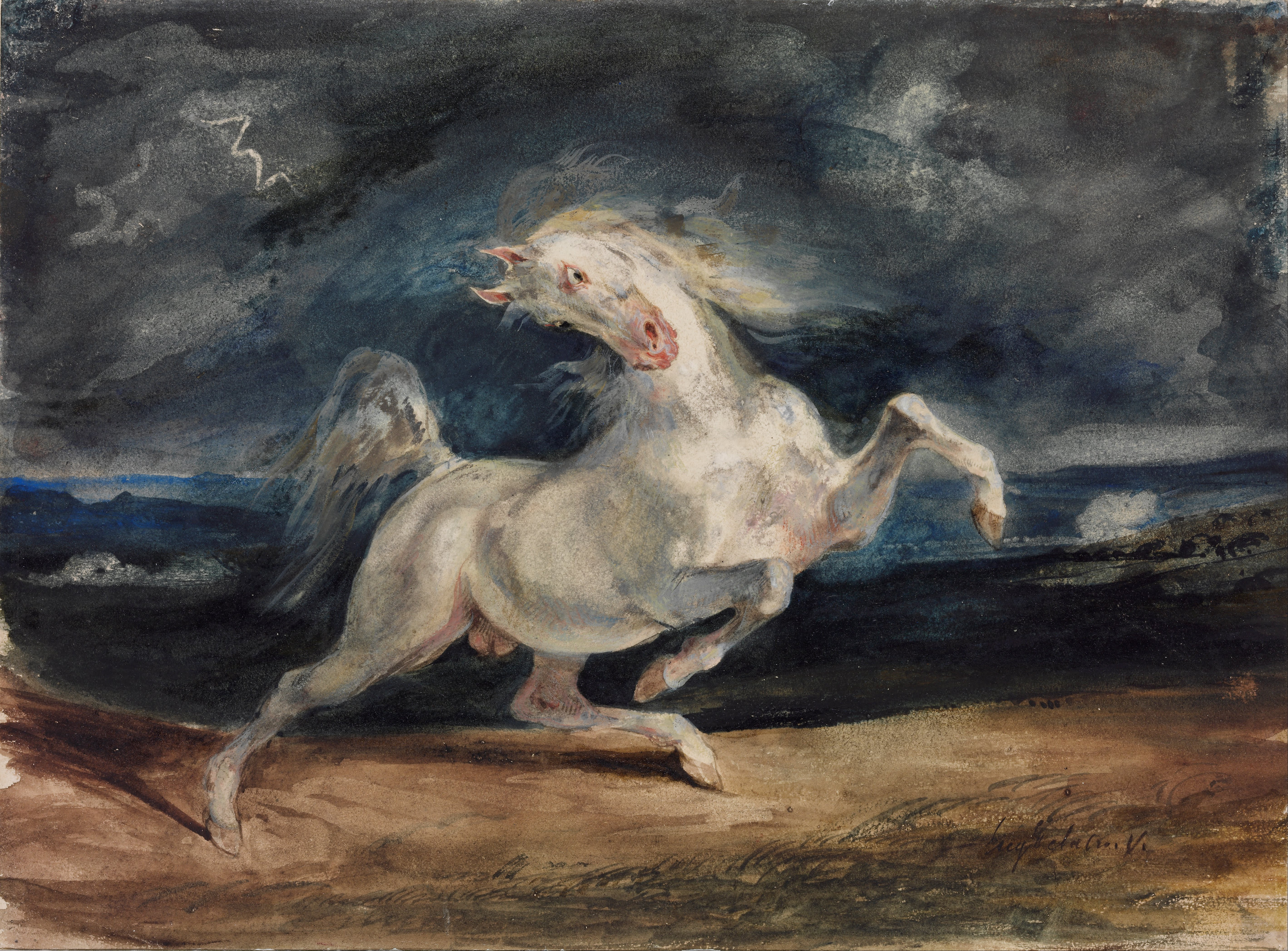
Horse Frightened by a Thunderstorm – Eugène Delacroix (1824)

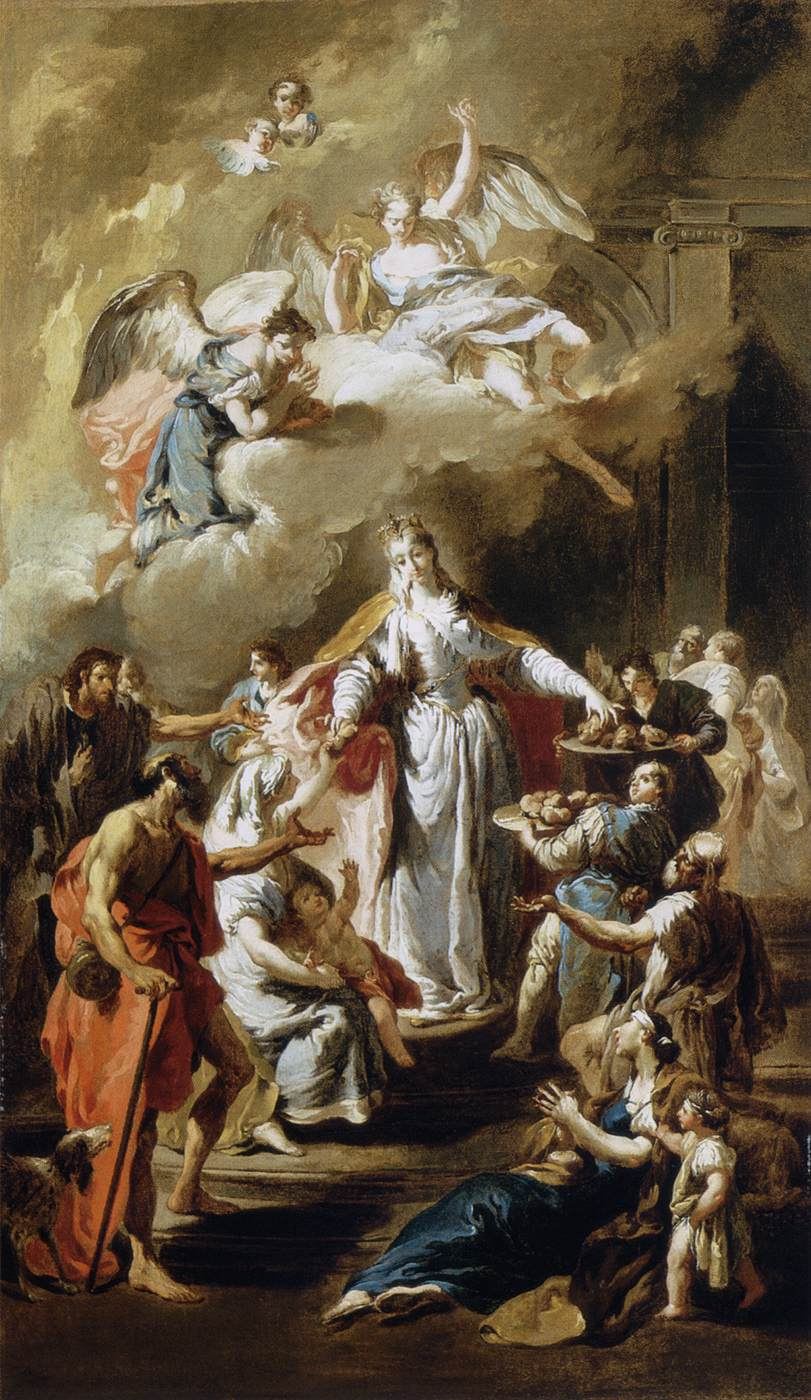
St Elizabeth Distributing Alms – Giambattista Pittoni (1734)

=== Old sculpture ===
The collection's main section is devoted to pieces from the Middle Ages to the 17th century. It was based on the Italian collection of Karoly Pulszky and Istvan Ferenczy's bronze collections. From the latter came one of the most treasured works, the Rearing Horse and Mounted Warrior by Leonardo da Vinci. A number of painted wooden sculptures feature in the German and Austrian section.

==== Drawings and prints ====
The collection shows selected rotating exhibitions of its collection of 10,000 drawings and 100,000 prints originating mainly from the Esterhazy, Istvan Delhaes and Pal Majovsky acquisitions. All periods of European graphic art are represented. Important pieces include two studies by Leonardo da Vinci for the Battle of Anghiari, 15 drawings by Rembrandt, 200 pieces by Goya, and French aquatints.

==== Art after 1800 ====
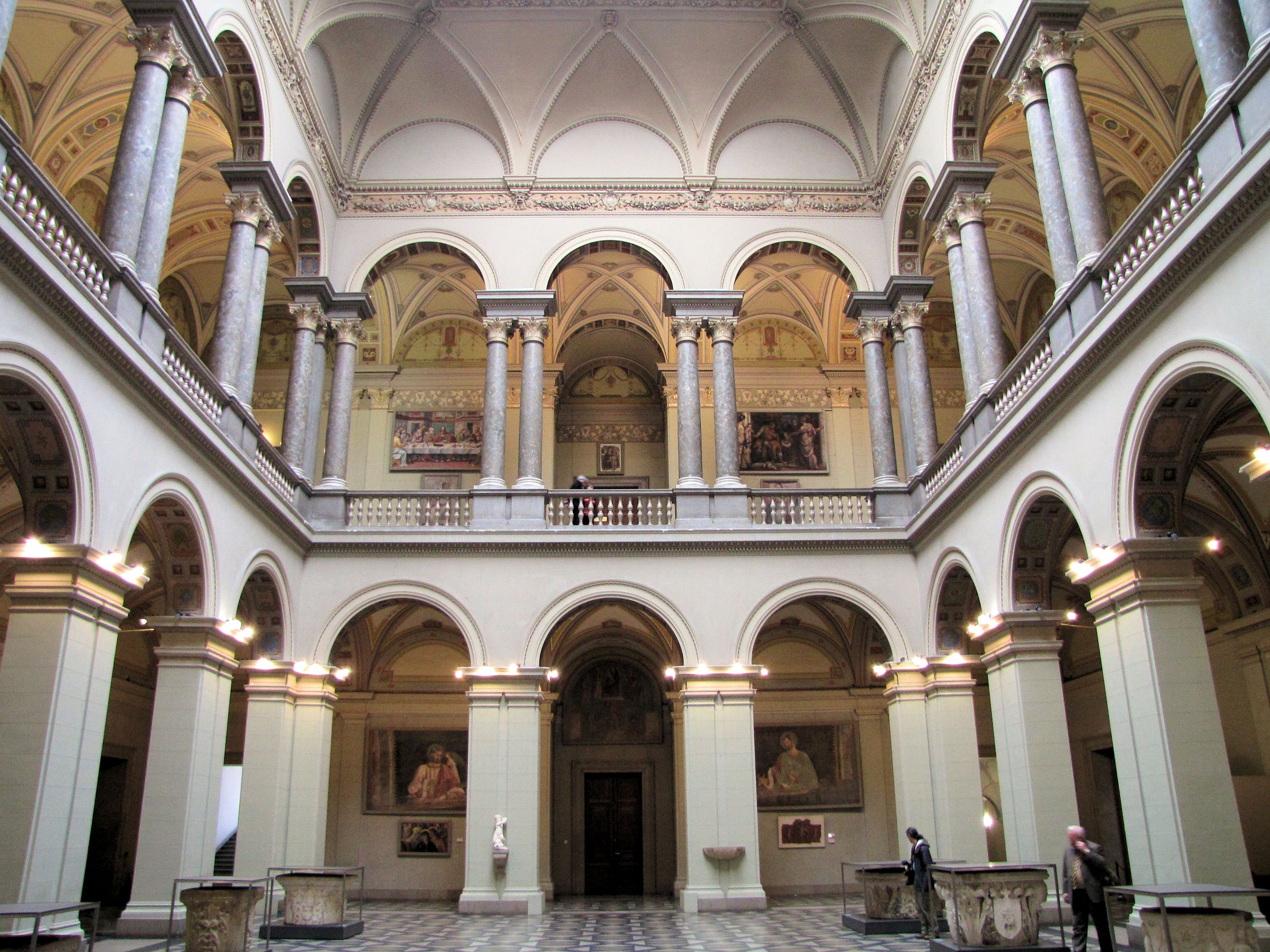
Renaissance Hall

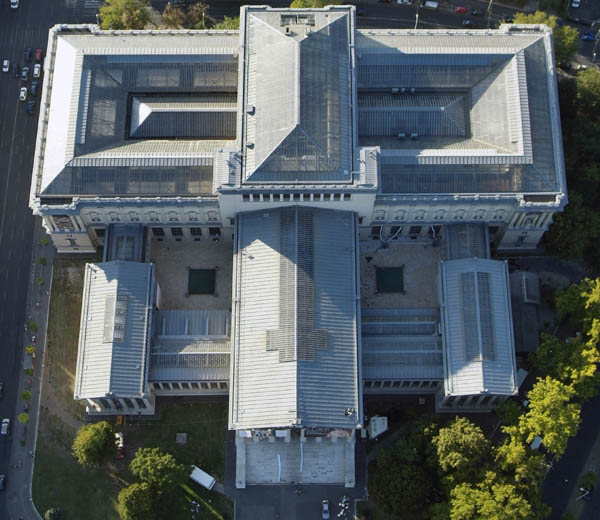
Aerial view

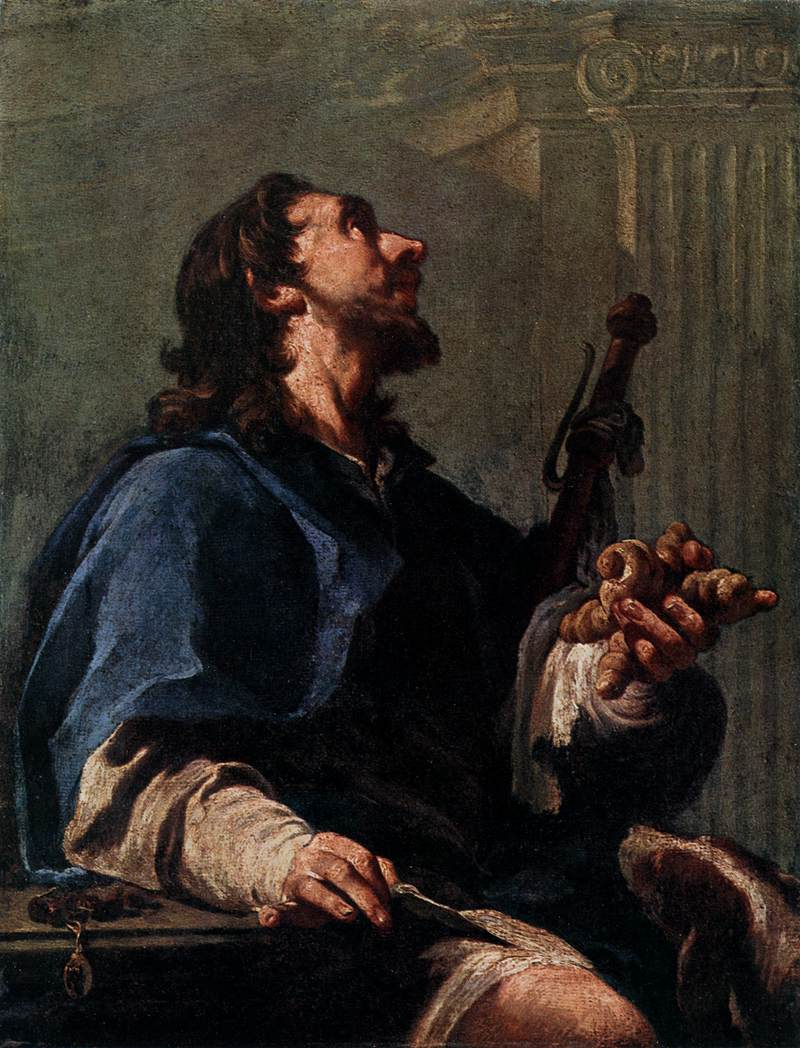
St. Roch – Giambattista Pittoni (1727), Oil on canvas, 42 x 32

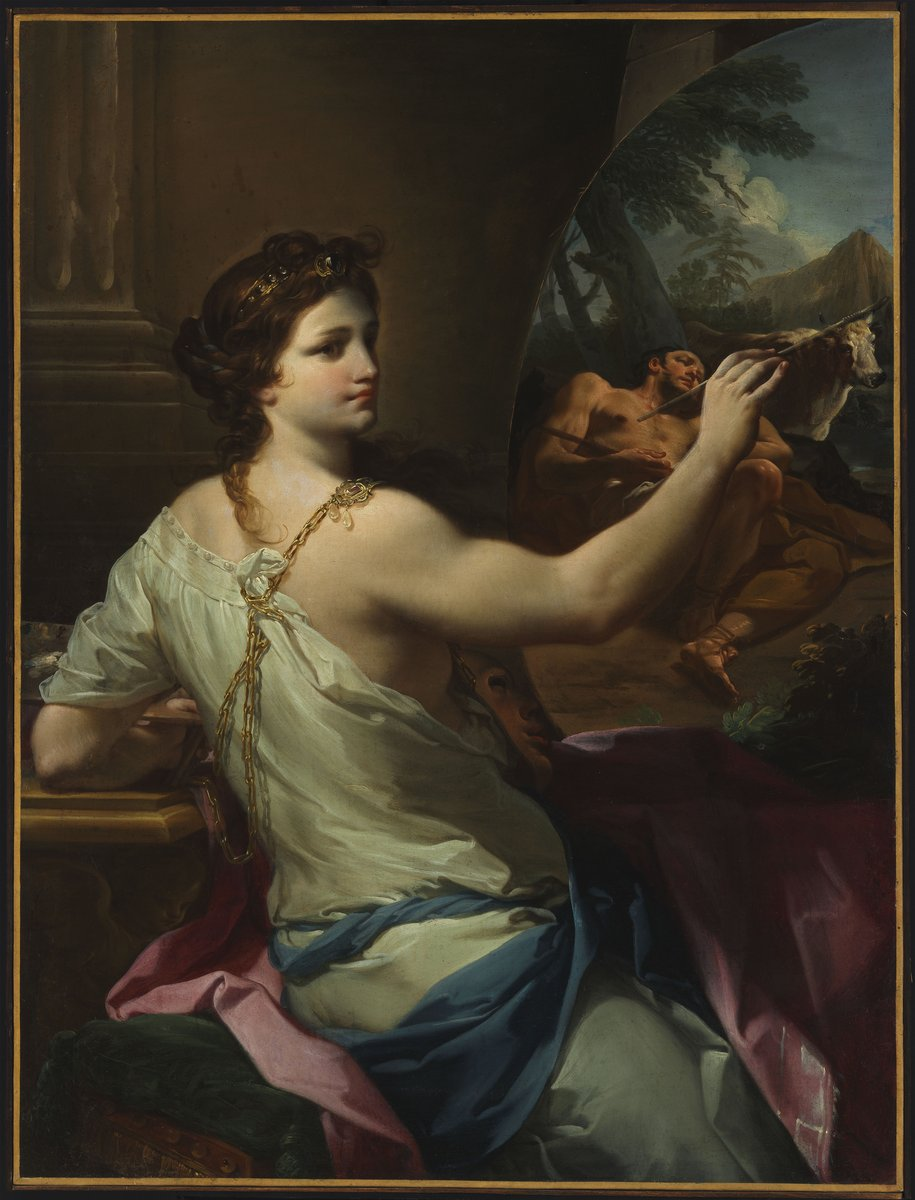
Allegory of Painting – Corrado Giaquinto (1750), oil on canvas, 98 x 74

The museum's collection of 19th- and 20th-century art is less significant than those found in other departments; it is a younger collection. The bulk of the painting is from the Biedermeier period and French art. From the latter are representatives of the Romantic period (Eugène Delacroix), the Barbizon School (Jean-Baptiste-Camille Corot, Gustave Courbet) and Impressionism (Édouard Manet, Claude Monet, Camille Pissarro, Pierre-Auguste Renoir, Henri de Toulouse-Lautrec). There is a large collection of sculptures by Auguste Rodin and Constantin Meunier.

== Vasarely Museum ==
Hungarian artist, Victor Vasarely, donated a significant collection of his works to the gallery. These have found a permanent home outside the walls of the gallery at the Zichy mansion in Óbuda. The two-storey wing of the building is known as the Vasarely Museum and is the only one of its kind in eastern Europe.

== Directors of the museum ==
- 1906–1914 Ernő Kammerer
- 1914–1935 Elek Petrovics
- 1935–1944 Dénes Csánky
- 1949–1952 Imre Oltványi
- 1952–1955 Ferenc Redő
- 1956–1964 Andor Pigler
- 1964–1984 Klára Garas
- 1984–1989 Ferenc Merényi
- 1989–2004 Miklós Mojzer
- 2004– László Baán

== Budapest Museum Quarter project ==
In 2008, the director of the Museum of Fine Arts, László Baán, proposed the merging of his museum with that of the Hungarian National Gallery, due to the similar exhibition and collection profile of the two. Both (along with the Ludwig Museum of Contemporary Art) specialise in 20th century and contemporary fine art, much of which was created by Hungarian artists living overseas. After his request to add an €18million underground extension to the Museum of Fine Arts, which would have united collections spread across the city, was denied in February 2011, Baán presented an alternative plan to the government to build two new buildings at the cost of €150M. He envisioned the new buildings, one housing contemporary European art and the other Hungarian photography, as a "special museum island" that would complement the Museum of Fine Arts and the Hall of Art (Műcsarnok) by permanently joining the two collections by 2017.

In September 2011, Secretary of State for Culture Géza Szőcs officially announced plans to build a new structure along Andrássy út close to City Park and near the existing Budapest Museum of Fine Arts and Hall of Art (Műcsarnok). This building would house the collections of the current Hungarian National Gallery. This expanded plan, which would utilise the entire boulevard, is also referred to as the Budapest Museum Quarter or Andrássy Quarter.

In early December 2011, Ferenc Csák, director of the Hungarian National Gallery since 2010, and critical of the proposed merger of the gallery with the Museum of Fine Arts, called the merge process "[v]ery unprofessional, anti–democratic and short–sighted" and announced that he would resign at the end of 2011. As of 5 March 2012, a new director had not been named and the Hungarian National Gallery was being led by Deputy General Director, György Szűcs.

== See also ==
- Hall of Art — contemporary art museum across the square
- Hungarian National Gallery
- List of museums in Hungary
- List of largest art museums
- Museums in Budapest
