= Egri Road Beatles Múzeum =

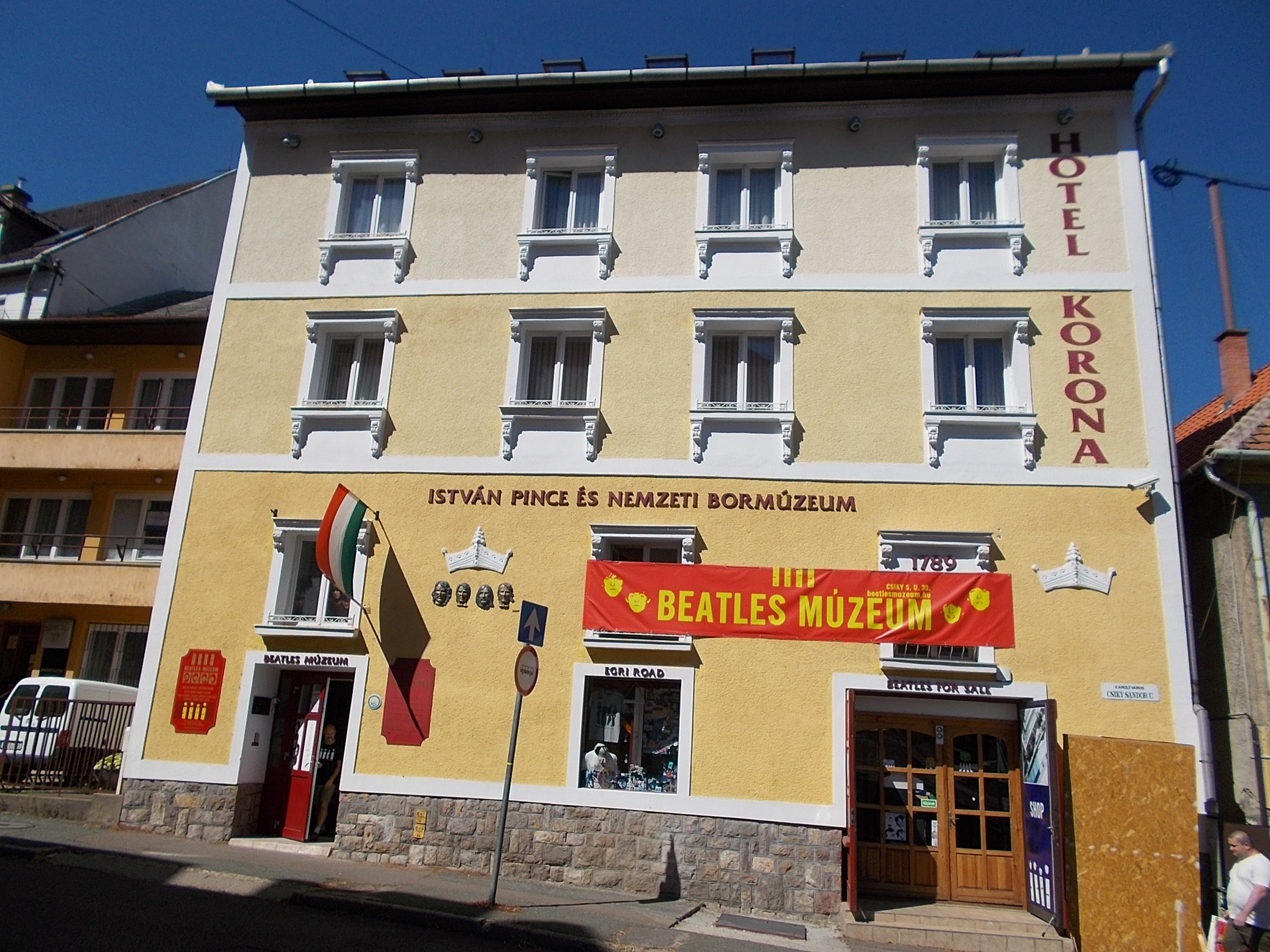
- the museum in 2016

- Location within Hungary
- Established: 15 May 2015
- Location: Csiky Sándor utca 30, Eger
- Coordinates: 47°54′11.8″N 20°22′11.8″E
- Type: biographical museum
- Collections: about The Beatles
- Website: beatlesmuzeum.hu

The Egri Road Beatles Múzeum is a museum in downtown Eger, Hungary. It is dedicated to the former British pop group The Beatles.

== History ==
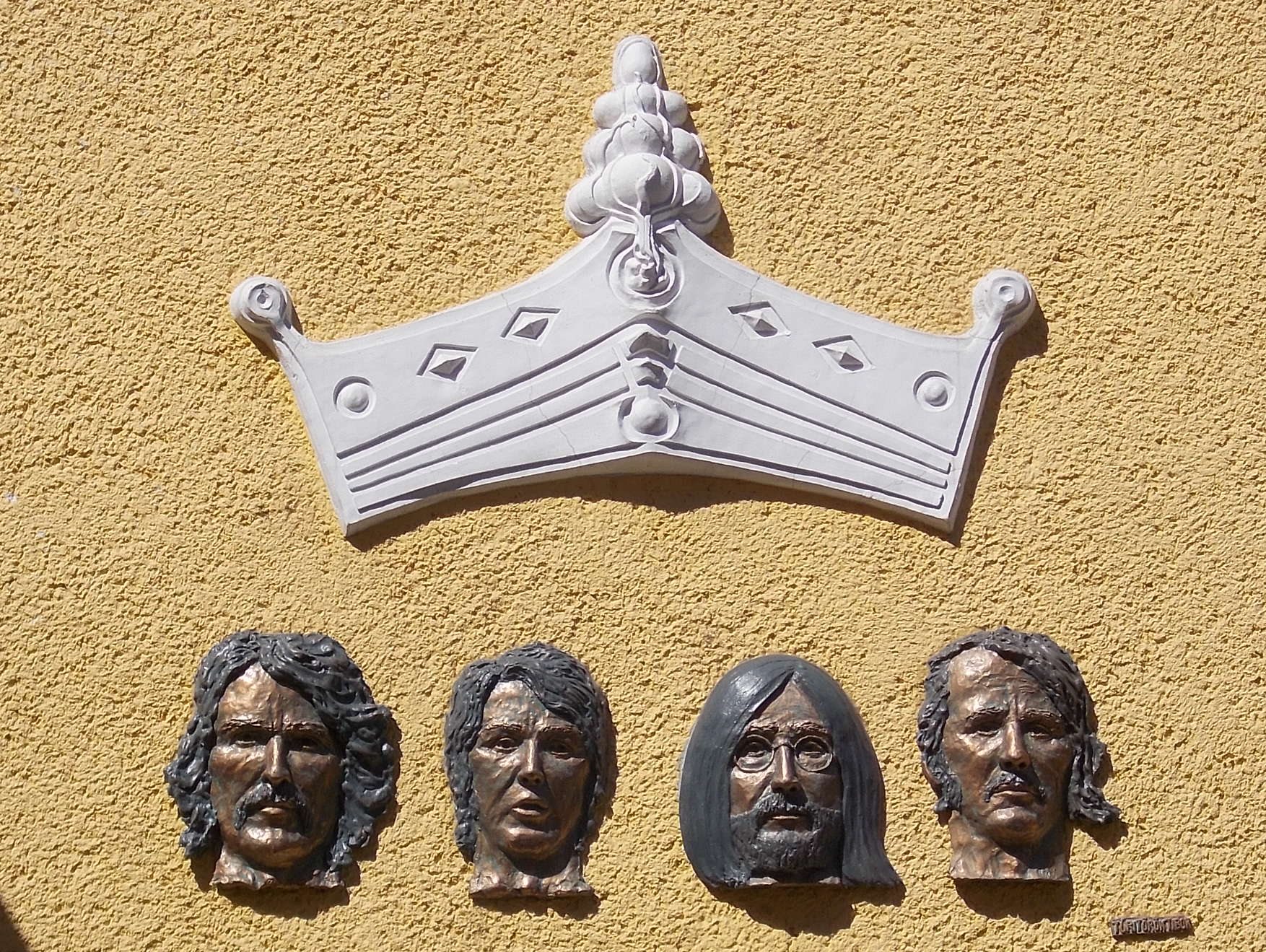
Front of the museum

The museum was opened on 15 May 2015 by János Bródy (born 1946), a Hungarian Kossuth Prize winner (2000) and singer-songwriter. It is situated in the basement of the Korona Hotel.

Egri Road in the name of the museum is chosen for the resemblance with Abbey Road in London, as well a name giver for the Abbey Road Studios of The Beatles and their album Abbey Road.

== Collection ==
The collection was brought together by Gábor Peterdi and Gábor Molnár. Peterdi inserted the photo collection of Dezo Hoffmann (1912-1986). He was a Czechoslovak (Slovak) photographer who captured many artists on film in the sixties, like The Beatles, The Rolling Stones, Jimi Hendrix, Bob Marley, Marilyn Monroe and others. Molnár is a writer of the book Immortal on The Beatles and inserted an extensive record collection and many memorabilia from the sixties.

The musical history of the band is being presented through presentation boards, and audio and visual material. Next to them, the collection consists of various books, publications, photographs, guitars, a drum kit and other memorabilia. There is also a brick of the Cavern Club which was bought on an auction in 1983 when this Liverpool club had been pulled down.

== See also ==
- List of museums in Hungary
- List of music museums
