= Dezo Hoffmann =

Slovak photographer, photojournalist and cameraman

- Born: Dezider Hoffmann; 24 May 1912; Banská Štiavnica, Austria-Hungary (now Slovakia)
- Died: 29 March 1986 (aged 73); London, England
- Occupation: Photographer

Dezider Hoffmann (24 May 1912 – 26 March 1986), also known as Dezo Hoffmann or Dežo Hoffmann, was a Slovak photographer, photojournalist and cameraman from Czechoslovakia. In the 1960s he photographed pop and showbiz personalities, including The Beatles.

== Biography ==
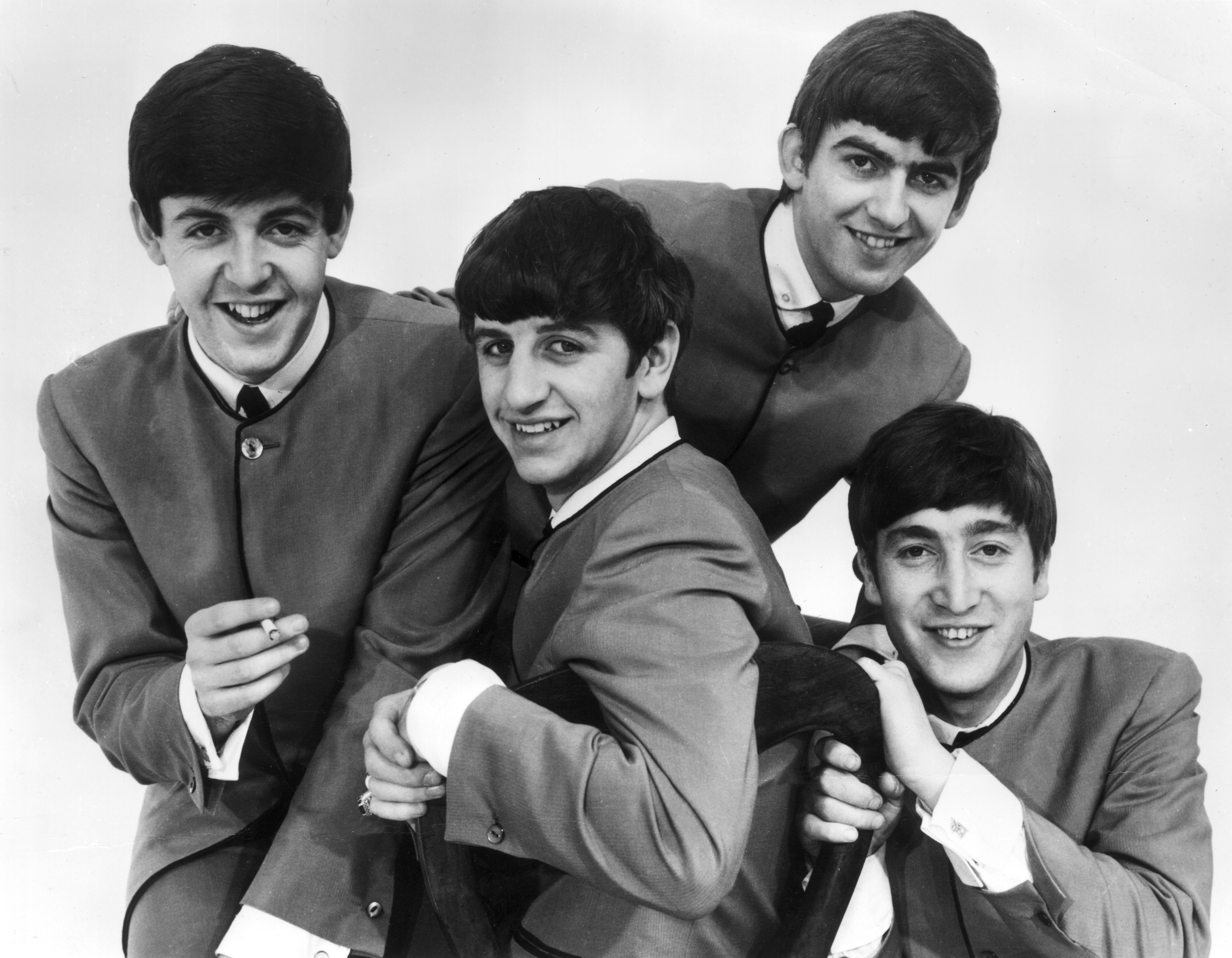
The Beatles, photographed by Hoffmann in 1963

Hoffmann was born on 24 May 1912 in Banská Štiavnica, Austria-Hungary (now Slovakia). After studying journalism in Prague, he worked at Twentieth Century Fox in Paris as a photojournalist. During the Italian invasion of Abyssinia he was sent to make a documentary of the invasion. After returning from Africa he was sent to Spain to film the 1936 People's Olympiad, a protest event against the 1936 Summer Olympics held in Berlin in then-Nazi Germany. Soon after his arrival there, the Spanish Civil War broke out, and Hoffmann found himself on the barricades. In this period he met personalities such as Ernest Hemingway and Robert Capa.

Hoffmann was injured a few times in war. The third injury was serious, leaving him without memory for several months. After recovery he moved to England and joined the squadron of Czechoslovak pilots flying with the RAF during World War II. After the war Hoffmann remained in London, working for various newspapers and magazines. In 1955 he began his collaboration with Record Mirror, which was the start of his career photographing show-business celebrities.

In 1962 Hoffmann went to Liverpool to photograph an unknown group, The Beatles. Mutual appreciation and sympathy led to a long-lasting relationship between Hoffmann and the group. Hoffmann also made an 8 mm colour film during this first Beatles assignment, also featuring scenes shot by The Beatles. His photo collection of The Beatles has been shown in the Egri Road Beatles Múzeum in Hungary since 2015.

Most of the photographs used in the Beatles' Live at the BBC CD/LP, including the one used for the front cover, were taken by Hoffmann.

Besides the Beatles, Hoffmann photographed many other celebrities like Charlie Chaplin, Marilyn Monroe, Marlon Brando, Elton John, Bob Marley, Cliff Richard, Sophia Loren, Frank Sinatra, Louis Armstrong, and Jimi Hendrix, as well as musical acts such as The Animals, The Jeff Beck Group, and The Rolling Stones.

In 1982, Omnibus Press published With the Beatles - The historic photographs of Dezo Hoffmann, with photographs taken by Hoffmann during the height of Beatlemania. Hoffmann later sold 100 of his Beatles negatives to Australian Colin Kaye. The remainder of Hoffmann's archive of approximately 1 million photographs of pop musicians and showbiz personalities was acquired by Rex Features.

Hoffmann died on 29 March 1986, aged 73, in the Harley Street Clinic, London. He was cremated at Golders Green Crematorium.

== Publications ==
- With the Beatles - The historic photographs of Dezo Hoffmann. Omnibus, 1982. ISBN 0-399-41009-0.
- The Beatles Conquer America - The Photographic Record of their First Tour. Virgin, 1984. ISBN 0-86369-054-8.

== Collections ==
Hoffmann's work is held in the following permanent collection:

- National Portrait Gallery, London
