= László Baán =

Hungarian economist, politician

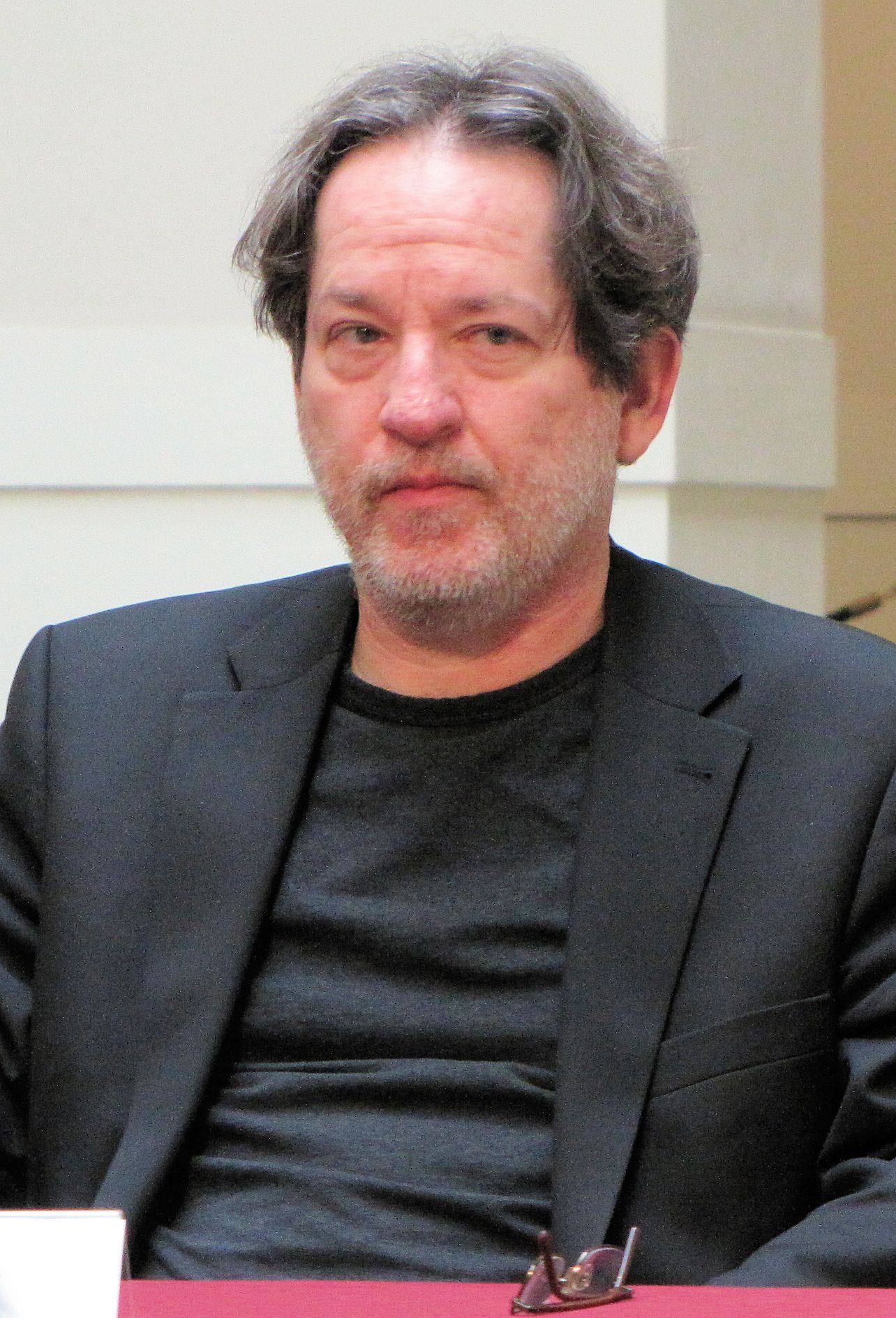
- Born: July 18, 1961 (age 64); Budapest, Hungary
- Occupations: Economist, museum director, politician

László Baán (born 18 July 1961 in Budapest) is a Hungarian economist and museum curator.

Baán has been Director General of the Museum of Fine Arts in Budapest since 2004 and since 2011 has also been director of a new national collection of buildings at the museum.

== Education and career ==
Baán graduated in Economics and Science in Budapest. Between 1998 and 2004 he served as secretary of state of the Ministry of National Cultural Heritage.

In 2004, he was appointed him as Director General of the Museum of Fine Arts. In 2007, the Van Gogh exhibition was the 15th most popular exhibition in 2010 in its category, with a total of 231,000 visitors in the world's seventh most visited exhibition in 2010, according to The Art Newspaper. The institution has been among the 100 most visited museums in the world several times in recent years. In October 2007, the Museum of Fine Arts Museum launched a museological journal called Café, which became the magazine of the year in 2009 and won the third prize in the European Design Awards in 2011.

Under his leadership, an underground expansion of the Museum of Fine Arts was planned. The museum has submitted a successful EU grant application for the nearly four billion forints investment. The public procurement application was planned for the construction in early 2011, but the investment was stopped by the government in February 2011.

In 2012, he was appointed as Director of the National Gallery of Hungary due to the unification with the Museum of Fine Arts.

He is a member of the European Academy of Sciences and Arts.

== Controversies ==
As Director General of the Museum of Fine Arts, he made the museum for free in 2007 for Árpád Habony's wedding, at which he was the witness.

In the early 2010s, the Museum of Fine Arts borrowed ten valuable antique paintings to a Serbian street apartment, which was linked to Árpád Habony.

== Awards ==
In 2011, the French Minister of Culture Frédéric Mitterrand awarded Baán with the knightly degree of art and literary order of the French Republic. In 2017, he was awarded the Knights of Honor for his work on the development of cultural relations between France and Hungary.
