= Horse Frightened by a Thunderstorm =

c. 1824 painting by Eugène Delacroix

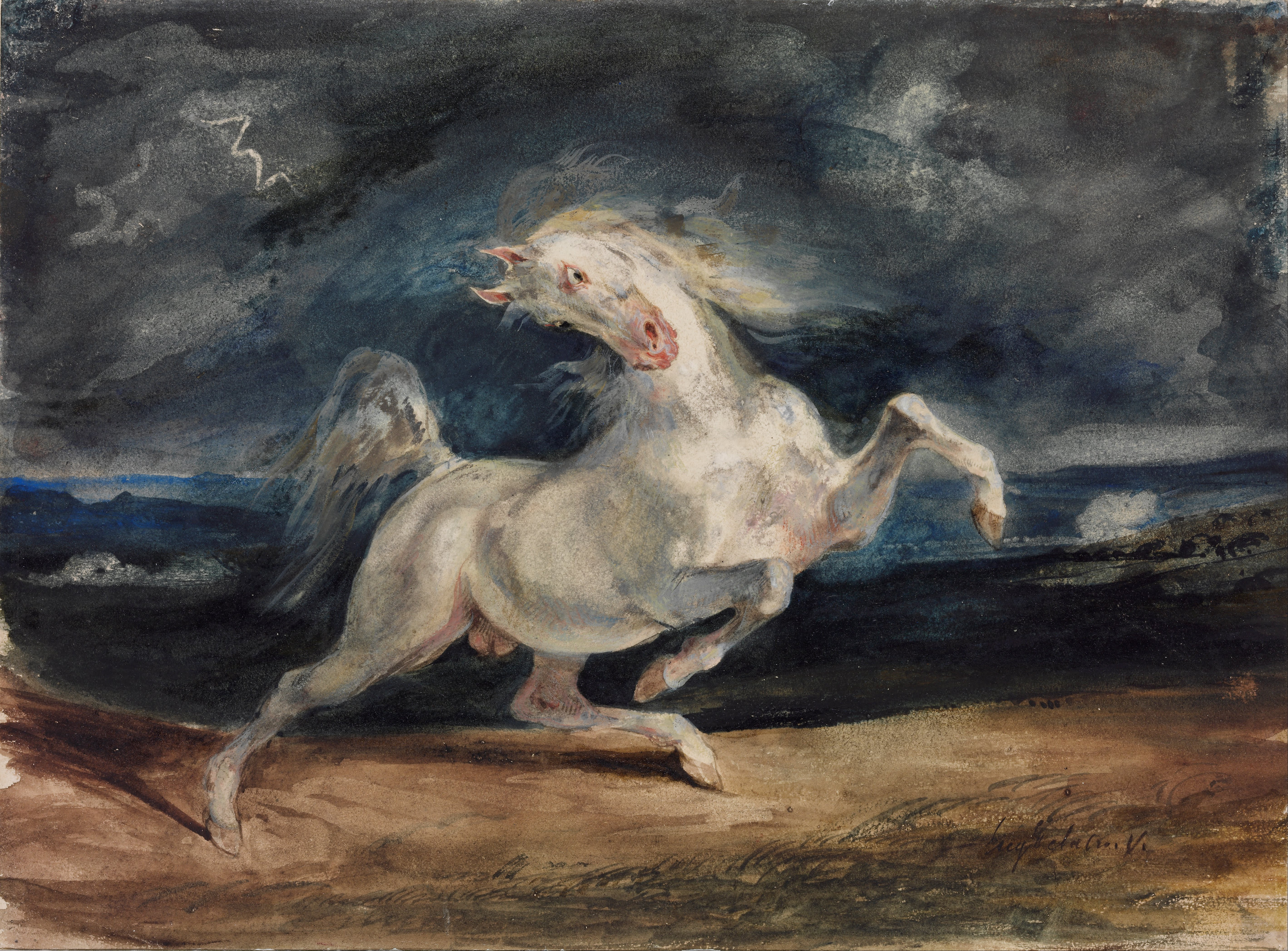
Horse Frightened by a Thunderstorm (c. 1824) by Eugène Delacroix

Horse Frightened by a Thunderstorm or White Horse Frightened by a Thunderstorm is a watercolour on paper work by the French Romantic artist Eugène Delacroix painted sometime between 1824 and 1829, most probably in 1824.

Showing a horse frightened by lightning beside the seashore, it was probably inspired by Théodore Géricault's Isabelle the Horse Frightened by A Thunderstorm (National Gallery, London), painted during that artist's stay in England. Delacroix gave his watercolour to Baron Schwiter. In 1934 the art collector Pál Majovszky donated it to the Budapest Museum of Fine Arts, though it was loaned for the 1963 Paris exhibition on the centenary of Delacroix's death.
