= Omnibus Press =

British publisher of music-related books

- Parent company: Wise Music Group
- Founded: 1972
- Headquarters location: London, United Kingdom
- Distribution: Worldwide
- Publication types: Books
- Official website: omnibuspress.com

Omnibus Press is a publisher of music-related books. It publishes around 30 new titles a year to add to a backlist of over 300 titles currently in print.

== History ==
Omnibus Press was launched in 1972 as a general non-fiction publisher to complement the sheet music published and distributed by its parent company Music Sales Group. Music Sales had launched a separate company called Book Sales Ltd and the earliest Book Sales catalogue, issued in the early 70s, included compilations of underground comic strips, art and photography titles and one of the earliest books on the then newly discovered art of video.

After former Melody Maker music journalist Chris Charlesworth joined as Omnibus editor in 1983, it was decided to concentrate exclusively on music books, and among its earliest acquisitions was Rock Family Trees by music archivist Pete Frame which remains in print and have been the basis of two BBC TV series. Over the succeeding decades Omnibus has published many biographies on most rock musicians. These include Morrissey & Marr: The Severed Alliance by Johnny Rogan, Dear Boy: The Life of Keith Moon by Tony Fletcher, Uptight: The Velvet Underground Story by Victor Bockris and Catch a Fire: The Life of Bob Marley by Timothy White.

Among the rock and pop writers whose work has been published by Omnibus over the years are Richard Williams, Chris Welch, Peter Dogget, Patrick Humphries, David Sinclair and Everett True (UK) and Dave Marsh, Paul Williams, Nelson George, Jerry Hopkins, David Ritz and Danny Sugerman (US).

Wise Music Group has published The Beatles' printed sheet music since the company's inception, and this association is reflected in the many Beatles-related books that Omnibus has published. These include The Beatles: A Diary by Barry Miles, a Beatles insider from the early days, With The Beatles: The Historic Photos of Dezo Hoffman, and The Songwriting Secrets of The Beatles by Dominic Pedlar, an analytical study of their music. In 2007, Omnibus published Colin Larkin's Encyclopedia of Popular Music (Concise Edition). At 1,600 pages, this is the abridged version of Larkin's 10-volume encyclopedia, a biographical listing of rock, pop and jazz artists.

In 2006, Music Sales acquired Sanctuary Books which added a significant number of additional music books to the Omnibus list, as well as a number of sports, travel and novelty & gift books.

In February 2020, parent company Wise Music Group changed its name from The Music Sales Group.
