= Pulszky =

The Pulszky family of Hungary included several notable people:

- Ferenc Pulszky (1814–1897), writer and politician
- Károly Pulszky (1853–1899), art collector, Ferenc's son
- Romola de Pulszky, ballerina, wife of Vaslav Nijinsky, Károly's daughter

== See also ==
- List of titled noble families in the Kingdom of Hungary
