= Budapest Museum Quarter =

Proposed cultural site in Hungary

The Budapest Museum Quarter is a proposed new cultural and tourist site to be located on Andrássy út in Budapest, Hungary, and has at its core the merger of the Hungarian National Gallery with the Budapest Museum of Fine Arts into one institution. The concept has been around since at least 2008 when the Director of the Museum of Fine Arts proposed combining the two collections. In 2010, the Fidesz political party included the idea in its election campaign. Several other Budapest museums would be affected by the plan, which faces not only economic and legal hurdles, but also criticism from both members of the public and art professionals alike.

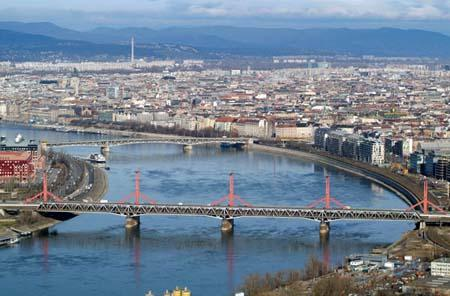
Aerial picture of Budapest

== Background ==
=== Hungarian national museum system ===
National museums in Hungary are those institutions that are state–owned and centrally financed. Many of them were created in the late 19th century under the Austro-Hungarian Monarchy as specialized complementary institutions to the original Hungarian National Museum. Although they received state sponsorship, the museums within this system — including the Museum of Natural History, Museum of Ethnography, Museum of Applied Arts, Museum of Fine Arts, the National Gallery and pre–World War II, the National Library and Archives — operated autonomously with their own board and endowment. However, with the introduction of Communism into Hungary in 1949, they lost their autonomy and were governed by the state under the auspices of the Ministry of Education and Culture.

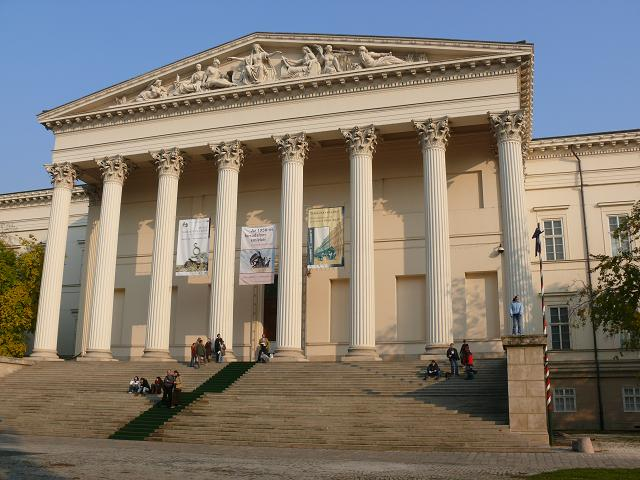
Façade of the Hungarian National Museum

The Hungarian National Museum is an important symbol of national identity because it played a major role in the anti-Habsburg Revolution of 1848 when the revolutionaries read their list of twelve demands, as well as a nationalistic poem on its front steps. The site is still used annually by the government to commemorate those events.

=== Fidesz government (2010) ===
==== Cultural policy ====
After winning a two–thirds parliamentary majority in the 2010 elections, Fidesz or the Hungarian Civic Union party began what was called a "hands–on cultural policy" that included appointing a media watchdog "that has the power to fine media outlets deemed to violate public interest, order and morals". It was suggested by members of the Hungarian art community that the center–right government was also influencing the appointment of a new director for the Budapest Art Hall (Műcsarnok) when the prior, Socialist–appointed incumbent's term ran out at the end of 2010. Francesca Von Habsburg was considered a favorite of the new, conservative government and a front–runner in the selection process. However, instead of choosing a candidate from this transparent process launched in November 2010, the Secretary of State for Culture Géza Szőcs (a recent Fidesz appointee) personally approved the decision to hire Gábor Gulyás, former director of the Centre for Modern and Contemporary Arts (MODEM) in Debrecen, Hungary.

In 2011, László Harsanyi, the director of the Holocaust Memorial Center and his chief historical adviser, Judit Molnár, were both relieved of their posts after the State Secretary for the Ministry of Public Administration and Justice, András Levente Gál, objected to the museum's display of an image of Hungary’s interwar leader Miklós Horthy. Saying that "this kind of historical inaccuracy [unjustifiably linking Hungary to the deportation of Jews to Nazi concentration camps] creates unnecessary tension," Gál drew the wrath of dozens of local historians and social scientists. But according to Molnár, "we could not change the permanent exhibition to align with the new political expectations since we regard that as a falsification of history." A Fidesz party MP and former chairman of the parliamentary cultural and press committee László Simon was also appointed to lead the National Cultural Fund of Hungary, which until then had been independent of the government. Other early 2012 replacements included that of Győrgy Szabó, director of Trafó — a leading contemporary art center — by choreographer Yvette Bozsik, and the director of Budapest’s Új Szinház theater, István Márta by György Dörner, an actor with extreme right–wing political affiliations. According to art historian Éva Forgács, “the government wants to disrupt the fabric of Hungarian culture, by having leading cultural figures disappear and replacing them with their own.” However, Simon dismissed any controversies over his and similar appointments as being politically motivated by the opposition.

In 2012, the government decreed that the network of over two hundred county museums that had been in operation for more than a century would fall under the auspices of local city governments. However, the deputy leader of the parliamentary cultural committee Gergely Karácsony criticized the decision, arguing that it went against professional standards and that a much better choice would have been unifying the galleries and museums under the Hungarian National Museum system. This would have allowed them to be state-funded, instead of relying on already underfunded local budgets that may lead to the closing of these institutions.

==== Constitutional changes ====
On January 1, 2012, amendments created in the spring of 2011 by Fidesz to the Hungarian Constitution took effect and were not only criticized by many citizens within the country, but also by forces within the European Union and the United States. Some of these changes included "a preamble committed to defending the intellectual and spiritual unity of the nation", references to previously excluded social issues like the definition of marriage and modifications to the electoral process. Within days, tens of thousands of people marched in protest in Budapest. Initially, the government defended replacing the old Constitution stating that it was "high time" for the changes to be made. To support his May 2010 remarks that “Hungarian culture must be refreshed with works of art, prizes, celebrations”, as well as publicize the legislative changes, Prime Minister Viktor Orbán opened a special government–organized exhibit at the National Gallery highlighting the sovereign statehood and Christianity within the 1,000 years of Hungarian history. Included in the show, which runs through August 2012, are 15 large, state–commissioned works depicting important events from the country's past 150 years, including a canvas of Orbán himself.

Facing increasing pressure from the EU, by mid–January 2012 the Fidesz government had agreed to change parts of the new legislation regarding constitutional changes to the independence of the central bank, the judiciary and data protection. However, they did not agree to change language regarding the cultural components of the proposal.

== The project ==
=== Initial proposals ===
The concept of a separate museum district within Budapest was a Fidesz campaign platform during the 2010 elections. It included plans for the area from the Western Railway Station to the current Museum of Fine Arts, located on Heroes' Square, to house a newly built Museum of Hungarian Modern Art, as well as a House of Europe for all the countries represented on the continent. The Museum of Ethnography would also be moved to this newly planned district. The project was intended by the party to "serve as a cultural–touristic–gastronomic centre with an exhibition and music hall and information centre" and be realized over a period of 15 years. The proposal was unveiled by István Tarlós, who at the time was chairman of the Fidesz party and who became mayor of Budapest later that same year. Consequently, a consensus developed during a series of professional debates that a museum master plan was essential because there was a real need for: a modern 21st century institution; an emphasis to collect and exhibit 20th century Hungarian art in an international context; and the expansion of media to include architecture, design, photography and media arts. Speculation by the press as to why none of these proposals seemed to get beyond the discussion and debate stage included the observation that "the prevailing cultural policy since the political transformation has been to continue with the old model — that is, the use of direct control instead of a structural transformation based on dialogue".

In 2008, the director of the Museum of Fine Arts, László Baán, proposed the merging of his museum with that of the National Gallery, due to the similar exhibition and collection profile of the two. Both (along with the Ludwig Museum of Contemporary Art) specialize in 20th century and contemporary fine art, much of which was created by Hungarian artists living overseas. After his request to add an €18million underground extension to the Museum of Fine Arts — which would have united collections spread across the city — was denied in February 2011, Baán presented an alternative plan to the government to build two new buildings at the cost of €150m. He envisioned the new buildings — one housing contemporary European art and the other Hungarian photography — as a "special museum island" that would complement the Museum of Fine Arts and the Budapest Art Hall (Műcsarnok) by permanently joining the two collections by 2017.

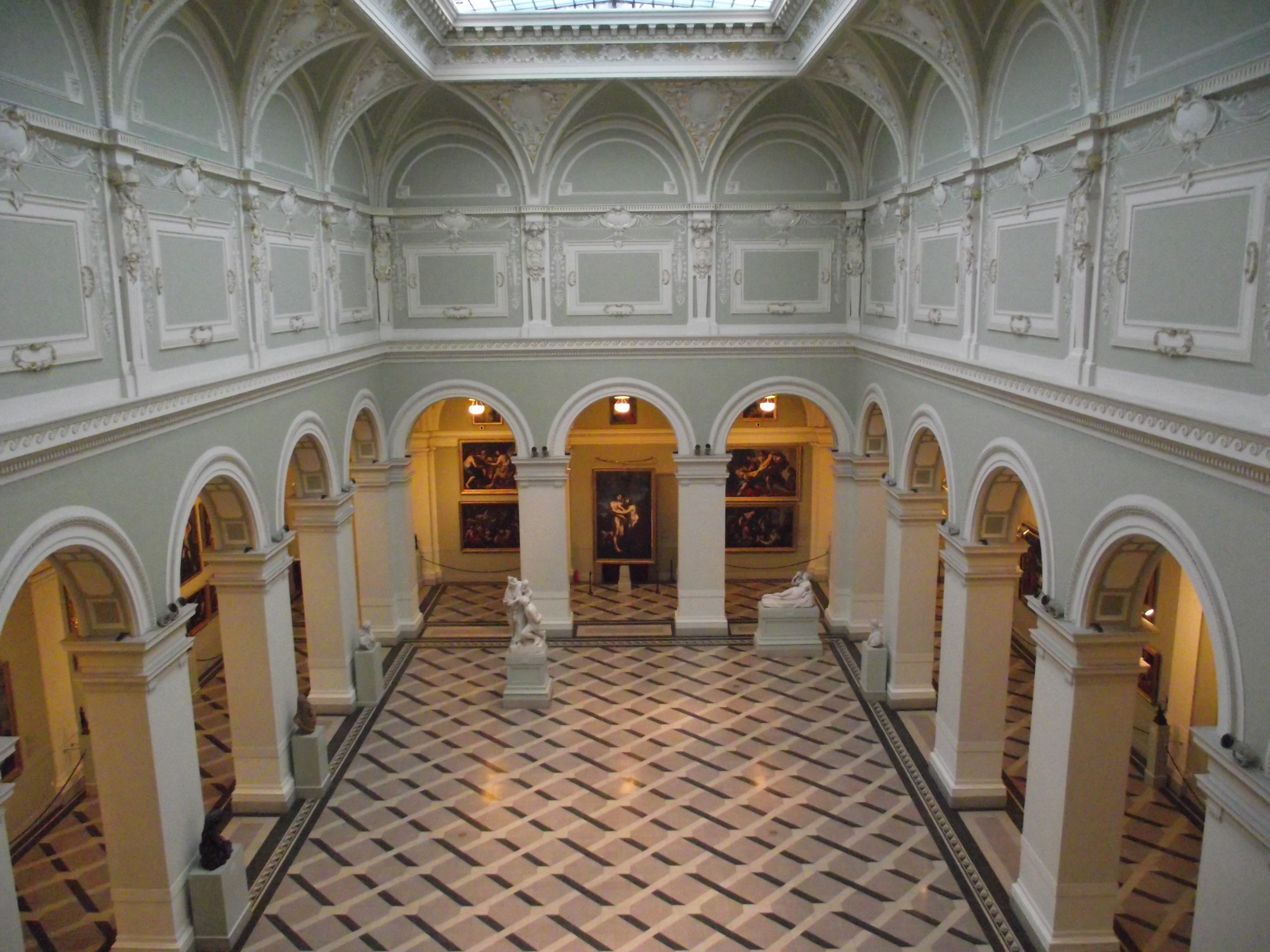
Interior of the Museum of Fine Arts

=== Current plans ===
In September 2011, Secretary of State for Culture Géza Szőcs officially announced plans to build a new structure along Andrássy út close to City Park and near the existing Budapest Museum of Fine Arts and Budapest Art Hall (Műcsarnok). This building would house the collections of the current Hungarian National Gallery. This expanded plan, which would utilize the entire boulevard, is also referred to as the Andrássy Quarter. The project would also involve the addition of a tunnel to redirect existing vehicular traffic, thereby creating a pedestrian–only zone that hasn't existed on Andrássy út since the late nineteenth century. In addition to other new venues for eating and entertainment on Andrássy út, there would also be changes made to City Park. One of these would be to rename the Hungarian State Circus after Harry Houdini, whose background as a Hungarian was relatively unknown even though he was world famous. This version of the project would take eight years and cost 20 billion HUF. After submission of a detailed proposal to the cabinet (expected in summer 2012), construction could begin by 2014.

The architectural design for this "New Gallery" will be chosen based on an international competition.

=== Appointments and resignations ===
According to the Hungarian News Agency (MTI), on October 1, 2011 László Baán was appointed to a two–year term as the government commissioner in charge of developing the new museum quarter, in addition to his existing position as director of the Museum of Fine Arts. In his new post, Baán will report directly to the Prime Minister, but will not get additional pay. He will be responsible for “preparing the concept, execution and architectural design–tender for a building complex to house the national public collection in Budapest’s 56–ers Square, with a special focus on merging the collections of the Museum of Fine Arts and the Hungarian National Gallery".

Baán has faced criticism before from both other institutions and interest groups, having radically transformed his museum from 2004 onward from one of relative obscurity to being an extensive contributor of loans to major international exhibits. While his process of fast modernization and innovation was supported by the government, it went against the typical standard of slow (or even non-existent) change in non–contemporary, eastern European museums.

In early December 2011, Ferenc Csák — director of the Hungarian National Gallery since 2010 and critical of the proposed merger of the gallery with the Museum of Fine Arts— called the merge process “[v]ery unprofessional, anti–democratic and short–sighted” and announced that he would resign at the end of 2011. As of March 5, 2012, a new director had not been named and the Hungarian National Gallery was being led by Deputy General Director György Szűcs.

== Protests and opposition ==
=== Political ===
This is not the first time that a recent Hungarian government has proposed the integration of multiple public institutions into one location. The plan is similar to that of the Government District which was to be built in generally the same area of Budapest behind the Western Railway Station in 2009 under the direction of then Prime Minister Ferenc Gyurcsány. However, that proposal — which was touted by the government as a green initiative to save on resources — was scrapped in early 2008 due to the enormous projected costs of rebuilding the infrastructure around the area.

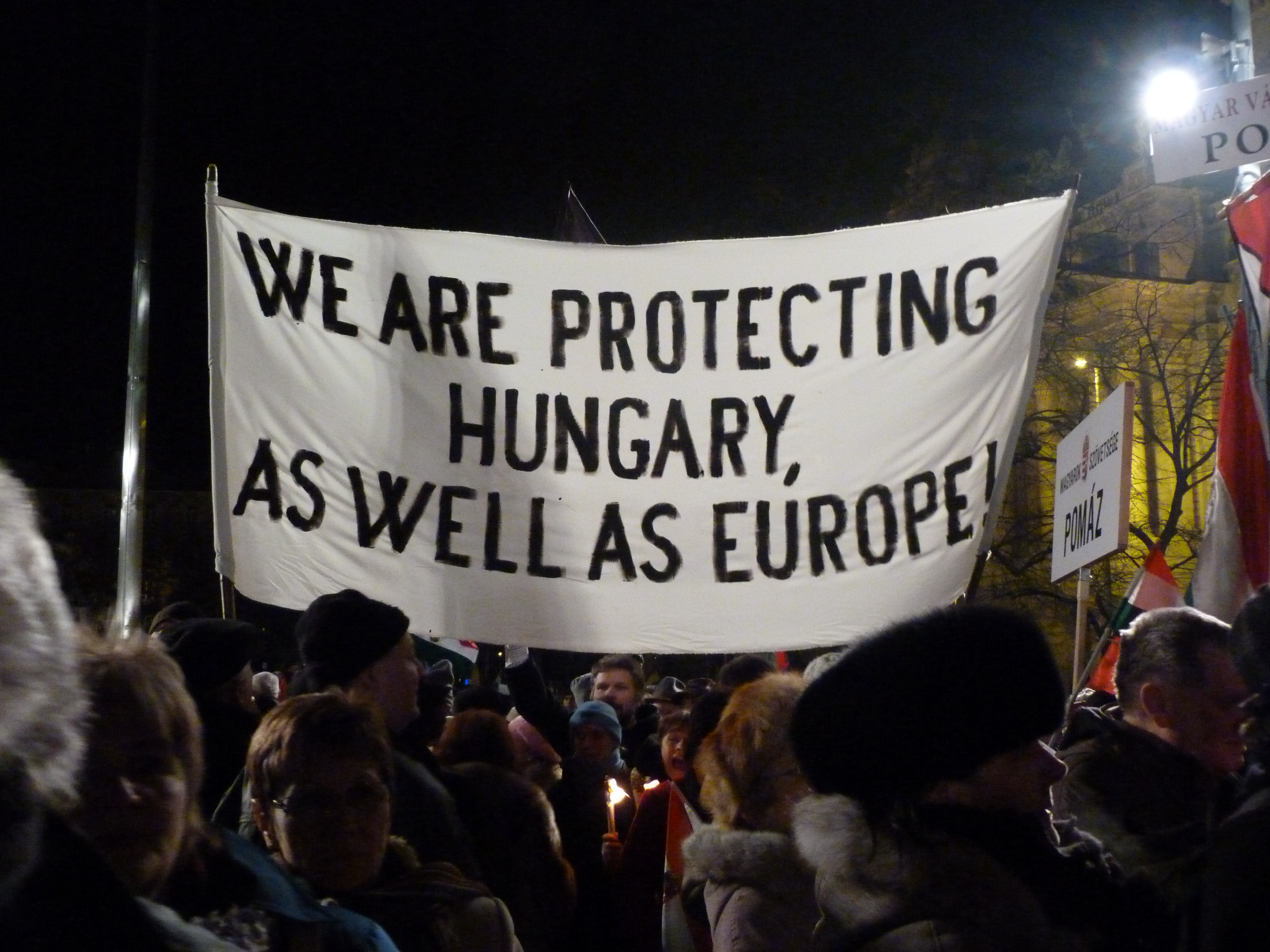
2012 Pro Government demonstration

There was speculation by historian András Gerő that Fidesz's recent policy changes stem from its staunch anti–communist stance, which "is not blindly ideological but driven by cold political calculation".

The resignation of former National Gallery director Ferenc Csák was partly motivated by the Fidesz government's exhibition Heroes, Kings, Saints. Images and Documents from the History of Hungary which he criticized by saying, “The government shouldn’t have the power to order exhibitions with such a high political agenda. Museums shouldn’t be getting involved in politics.”

Moving the collections of the National Gallery to a new location would leave the Buda Castle empty and available for other use. Although the government has made it clear that they will move out of the Parliament building by 2014, officials have not stated whether it is their intention to move government offices — including that of the Prime Minister — into the Castle once it is vacant.

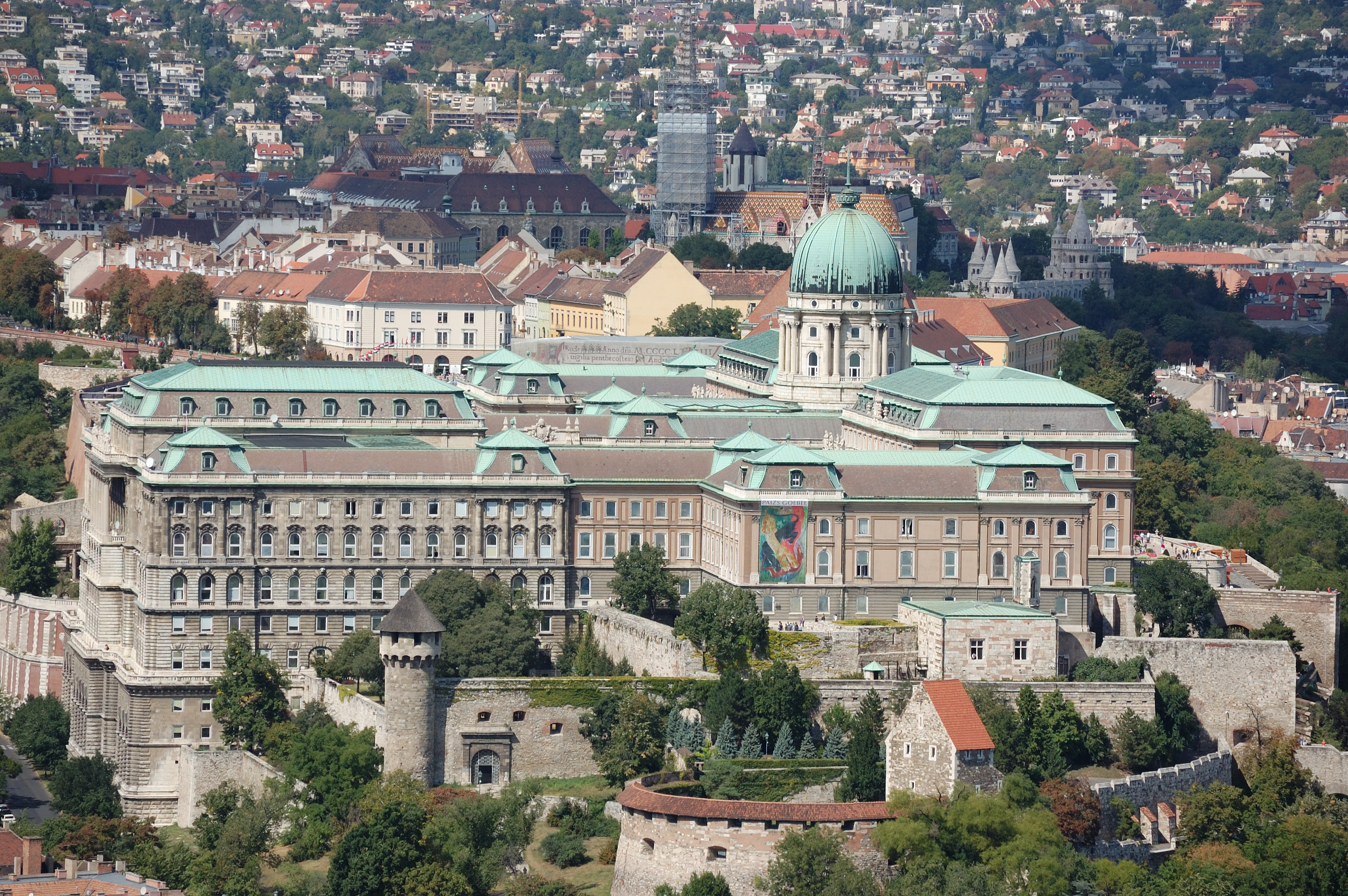
Buda Castle — current home of the National Gallery

=== Economic ===
In November 2011, Hungary was downgraded to junk status by one of the big international rating agencies. In spite of this, several major projects are planned for Budapest within the next few years, including that of the Museum Quarter.

Addressing criticism regarding the timing of such an expensive project with a weak economic situation, László Baán defended the Hungarian government's plans by saying that they are "making use of various instruments for dealing with the critical economic situation, many of which are surprising, unusual and, for that very reason, ferociously debated." However, he also added that "it fits perfectly with the logic of this government to launch a cultural mega–project of such emblematic significance right in the middle of general budget cuts: one which, besides its intrinsic value, also expresses an extremely important symbolic message".

=== Legal ===
There is also a legal hurdle to the various construction plans because of the existing zoning restrictions in the proposed location for the new buildings. The developed area within the City Park is already five percent over the allowable two percent limit, and this includes the site chosen by the government for the new museum. The zoning laws are reviewed every five or ten years; thereby any current plans would be considered illegal.

=== Social ===
In addition to opposition to the merging of the museums, the establishment of the museum quarter by forcing cars off Andrássy út also received criticism. Arguments included the fact that the scale of the massive boulevard is much too large to be restricted to only pedestrians and the wide, tree–lined sidewalks that exist are already adequate. Many of the shops along the route are also empty — a sign of the current status of the Hungarian economy — and would not make for a welcome sight to targeted tourists.

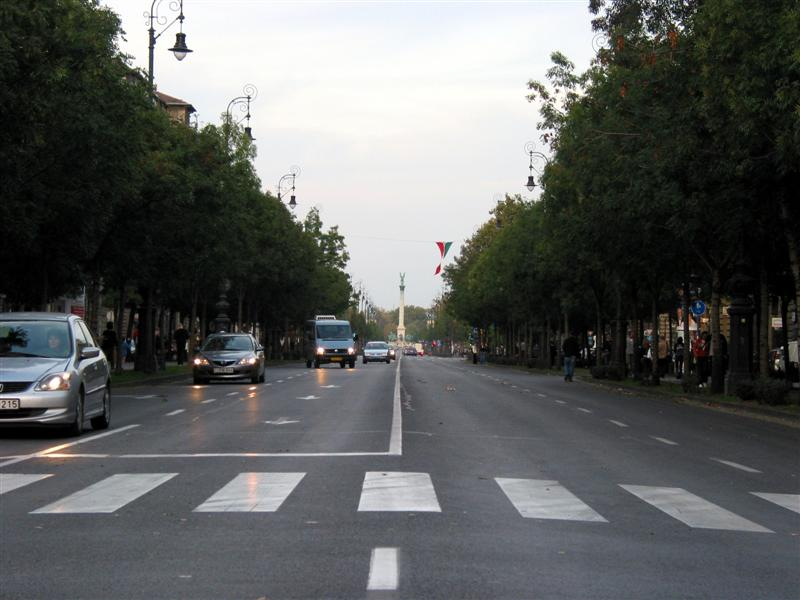
Andrássy út in Budapest

Art professionals have criticized László Baán's capacity to lead an endeavor to unite two such massive museums because he is not an art historian nor a museologist, but rather an economist by training. They fear that a merge would potentially damage Hungarian cultural heritage, both literally and figuratively. Additionally, leading Hungarian art historians worry that the physical move of such a large and valuable collection as that of the National Gallery is unprofessional and irresponsible. Between December 17, 2011 and the deadline for the merge on February 29, 2012 an online petition entitled "Protest Against the Merger of the Hungarian National Gallery and the Museum of Fine Arts" that was created by these individuals had received 2,945 signatures. On October 25, 2011 the Hungarian Section of the International Association of Art Critics (AICA) published their similar standpoint regarding the issue and also supported the on–line petition.

Baán dismissed these criticisms by reminding the Hungarian members of AICA that he was hired to conduct the necessary impact studies and hold discussions with key stakeholders in the next two years in order to address their concerns. He also stressed that the National Gallery would not cease to exist, but only that its collections would be relocated to return it to its pre–1957 state and give it more prominence.

== Similar places worldwide ==
Despite all of the challenges and the opposition to the planned Budapest Museum Quarter, creating unified spaces is not unheard of, as there are other major cities worldwide which have successfully created cultural and tourist centers by clustering museums and other similar attractions in one location.

=== Europe ===
The Museumplein of Amsterdam — a spacious square with a pond and park frequently used for outdoor festivals and events — lies in the heart of the museum quarter in Amsterdam surrounded by the Rijksmuseum, the Van Gogh Museum, the Stedelijk and the Concertgebouw.

Five institutions that are all part of the Berlin State Museums are located on the northern half of an island in the Spree River in Berlin, Germany and make up what is referred to as Museum Island.

More than a dozen museums in Frankfurt, Germany are clustered along the banks of the Main River in an area known as the Museumsufer.

Opened in 2001, the Museum Quarter in Vienna is one of the world's largest complexes for modern art and culture, encompassing nine permanent museums, exhibition halls, and creativity space for the dozens of culture initiatives based in the area. It is also home to restaurants, cafés and shops, attracting about 3.8 million visitors a year. It was created in order to coordinate the work of various museums after the establishment of a federal museum law.

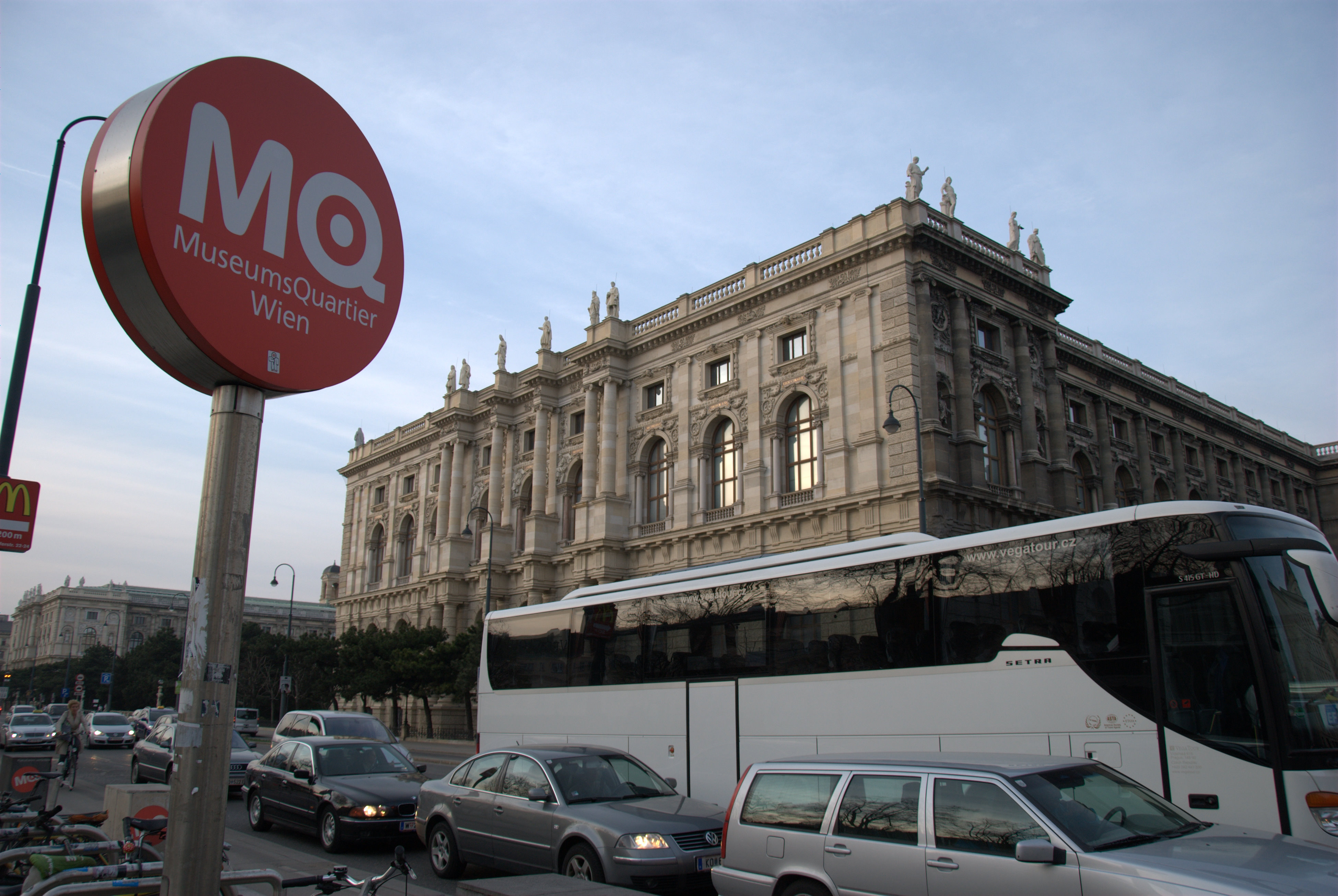
MuseumsQuartier Vienna

=== North America ===
Chicago's Museum Campus, which houses the Shedd Aquarium, Field Museum, Adler Planetarium, and Soldier Field, came to be in 1998 when the area next to Lake Michigan was replanned and landscaped with the intention of tying the institutions together with the use of green space.

The Dallas Arts District was proposed in 1978 and the first major museum to be located in the northeast corner of downtown was the Dallas Museum of Art, opened in 1984. Since then, the Morton H. Meyerson Symphony Center, the Crow Collection of Asian Art, the Nasher Sculpture Center, the Booker T. Washington High School for the Performing and Visual Arts, and the AT&T Performing Arts Center have all been moved or newly built in the area. In 2012, the City Performance Hall will complete the planned additions to the district.

The Dallas–Fort Worth metroplex contains another cluster of cultural sites at the Fort Worth Cultural District. It is not only home to five museums such as the Kimbell Art Museum, National Cowgirl Museum and the Fort Worth Museum of Science and History, but the overall park-like setting also contains the local performing arts centers like symphony, ballet and theater.

The pedestrian–friendly Museum District in Houston, Texas links 18 cultural institutions and attracts 8.7 million visitors each year. It is home to such facilities as the Buffalo Soldiers National Museum, the Children's Museum of Houston, the Museum of Fine Arts and the Contemporary Arts Museum of Houston, along with restaurants, shops and offices.

Exposition Park in Los Angeles contains several sporting venues, museums and recreational facilities within its 60 acres. Visitors will find the LA Coliseum and Memorial Sports Arena, as well as the Natural History Museum, California Science Center and African American Museum alongside the Expo Center.

The National Mall is a central green space in Washington, DC that is defined by the structures of the US Capitol on one end and the Jefferson Memorial on the other. Between these two points, visitors will find numerous memorials and monuments, as well as many museums belonging to the world-renowned Smithsonian Institution including the Quadrangle Museums Project, designed in 1987. It opens south from the Smithsonian Castle building and contains two small buildings which are staging areas for two underground museums, the Sackler Gallery of Asian Art, and the National Museum of African Art, and another smaller kiosk–like building which provides the entrance for the S. Dillon Ripley Center.

== Related issues ==
In addition to criticism surrounding the proposed Museum Quarter and the recent changes in leadership for key Hungarian cultural institutions, there are several other significant issues that affect the country's cultural heritage management.

=== Kossuth Square ===
A new controversy has erupted over the plans to restore the Kossuth Square in front of the Parliament building. The changes would include the removal of all monuments added since 1945 and replacing them with pre–1944 sculptures. In this plan, a 1980 sculpture of one of the greatest Hungarian poets, Attila József would be replaced by a monument of one–time prime minister Gyula Andrássy. Not everyone is overly worried about the government's actions, though. For example, artist Miklós Szűts believes that "the government might make symbolic gestures, like the paintings they commissioned, but they don’t have a major effect in reality.” However, the Socialist opposition planted a tree on Earth Day 2012 at the end of the square in protest of the government's undemocratic actions of modifying the space "without asking the people".

In addition to the statues of Kossuth Square being in danger, the fate of the Ethnographic Museum that is across from the Parliament building is also uncertain because the newly reinstated Hungarian Supreme Court (Kúria) has recently expressed interest in getting its former building back. According to the local newspaper Népszava, just moving the museum, as well as the Institute of Political History that also occupies the same building, would cost at least 5 billion HUF, but constructing new premises for both would take at least 15 billion HUF, if not double the amount".

=== Natural History Museum ===
In mid–2011, the Hungarian Natural History Museum was threatened with eviction from its building (known as the Ludovika Campus), which it received after the fall of communism in 1989. The government wanted to turn the premises into a university for the military or police, similar to its function prior to 1945, and thereby relocate the 70 staff and 10 million artifacts into a yet undecided space. A few days after this news, the government's Office of Public Affairs issued a joint press release with the museum that addressed the issue. They explained that in spite of two decades of effort, the museum still operates in three separate locations. Additionally, the move of the proposed National Civil Servant University into unutilized space in the Ludovika Campus would make it possible for the museum to receive additional space elsewhere, thereby improving its current situation by reducing the number of sites where it operates. The museum would keep the current space in the Ludovika's former stables and the underground rooms that it uses. The museum's leadership would also take part in the preparatory work regarding the renovations of the Ludovika Campus. Long–term plans involve moving the Hungarian Natural History Museum to the completed Museum Quarter.

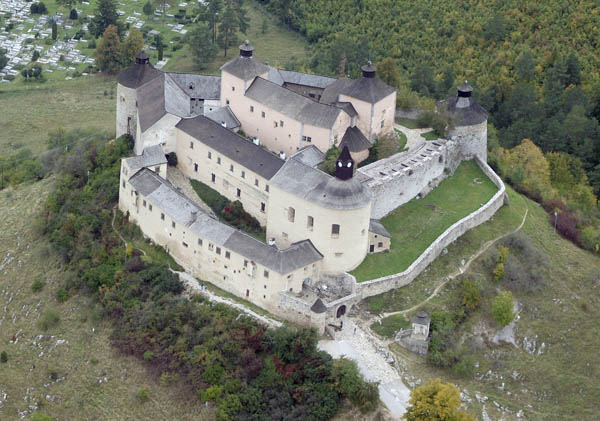
Krásna Hôrka Castle before the fire of 2012

=== Hopp Southeast Asia Museum ===
A private collection exhibiting almost 1,000 artifacts opened on Andrássy út in September 2011 as part of the new Southeast Asian Gold Museum. One source of contention among its critics is that the Ministry of Culture approved the title of "museum" without the usual requirements for records of the origin of the exhibits. The collection is both complementary to and competition of the existing Ferenc Hopp Southeast Asian Museum in Budapest, which the owner and curator of the new Gold Museum István Zelnik had been interested in acquiring since 2008. However, the leadership of the latter (which belongs under the umbrella of the Budapest Museum of Applied Arts) blocked his advances. Currently, the future of both the Hopp Museum and its sister institution the György Ráth Museum is uncertain. Owing to financial constraints, they are both only open for half–days on Friday through Sunday. There are also rumors within the Hungarian press that both museums are due to close on March 31, 2012 and that their collections are to be permanently transferred to the Museum of Applied Arts as a response to the Hopp Museum's previous bids for independent status under the auspices of the National Trust for Monuments (MNG).

=== Krásna Hôrka Castle ===
While Krásna Hôrka Castle is a National Cultural Monument of the Slovak Republic, it was built and inhabited by ethnic Hungarian families and was part of the Kingdom of Hungary until 1918. However, a massive blaze on March 10, 2012 destroyed much of the building and up to 10% of its historical collections. Fidesz's commitment to the preservation of Hungary's cultural heritage may be tested based on their response to the request for aid from the Hungarian Coalition Party of Slovakia to rebuild the thirteenth-century fortress, but the initial statement of the Hungarian Prime Minister was that the nation is prepared to assist with saving this priceless cultural asset.

== See also ==
- Art and Politics
- EU Cultural Policies
- Heritage Tourism
- Museology
- Museum
