= Andrássy út =

UNESCO World Heritage Site in Hungary

Andrássy Avenue
UNESCO World Heritage Site
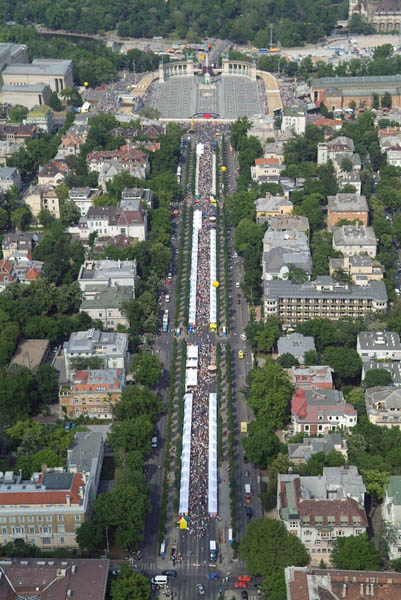

- Location within Hungary Location within Budapest
- Official name: Andrássy Avenue and the Underground
- Location: Budapest, Hungary
- Part of: Budapest, including the Banks of the Danube, the Buda Castle Quarter and Andrássy Avenue
- Criteria: Cultural: (ii), (iv)
- Reference: 400-002
- Inscription: 1987 (11th Session)
- Extensions: 2002
- Area: 57.85 ha (0.2234 sq mi)
- Buffer zone: 239.61 ha (0.9251 sq mi)
- Coordinates: 47°30′35″N 19°4′12″E

Andrássy Avenue (Hungarian: Andrássy út, pronounced [ˈɒndraːʃi ˈuːt]) is a boulevard in Budapest, Hungary, dating back to 1872. It links Erzsébet Square with the Városliget. Lined with spectacular Neo-renaissance mansions and townhouses featuring fine facades and interiors, it was recognised as a World Heritage Site in 2002. It is also one of Budapest's main shopping streets, with fine cafes, restaurants, theatres, embassies and luxury boutiques. Among the most noticeable buildings are the State Opera House, the former Ballet School (under reconstruction for several years), the Zoltán Kodály Memorial Museum and Archives, the Hungarian University of Fine Arts, and the Ferenc Hopp Museum of East Asian Arts.

== History ==
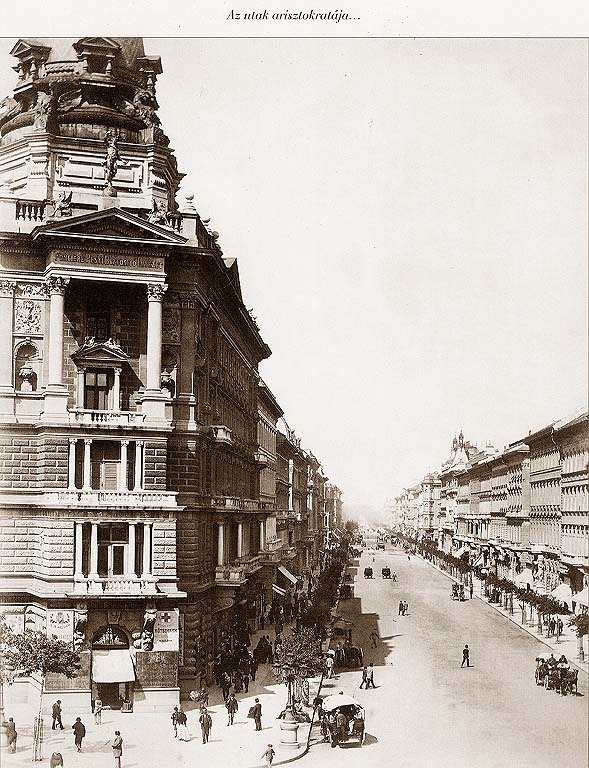
1875, Andrássy Avenue at Váczy körút (now Bajcsy-Zsilinszky út)

It was decreed to be built in 1870, to discharge the parallel Király utca from heavy traffic and to connect the inner city parts with the City Park. Its construction began in 1872 and the avenue was inaugurated on August 20 (a national holiday), 1876. Its realization was a blend of the plans proposed by the top 3 competitors Lajos Lechner, Frigyes Feszl and Klein & Fraser. Its palaces were built by the most distinguished architects (led by Miklós Ybl) of the time, financed by Hungarian and other banking houses. These were mostly finished by 1884 and mostly aristocrats, bankers, landowners and historical families moved in. It was named in 1885 after the main supporter of the plan, Prime Minister Gyula Andrássy.

The construction of the Budapest Metro, the first underground railway in Continental Europe, was proposed in 1870, since the capital had always been opposed to surface transport on this road. Construction began in 1894 and was finished in 1896, so this new metro line could facilitate the transport to Városliget, the main venue of the millennium celebrations of Hungary.

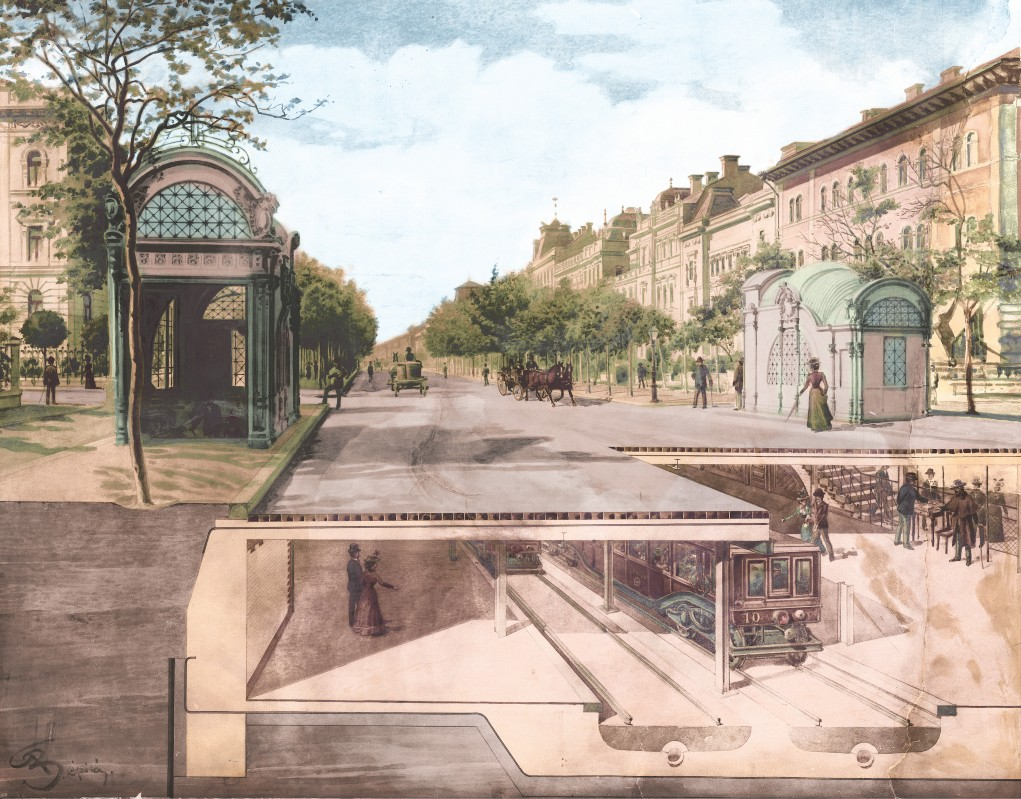
Cross-section of the first metro line under Andrássy út, 1890s

The boulevard was renamed three times in the 1950s; a testament to the rapid political changes of the period. It became Sztálin út ("Stalin Street") in 1950 during the Soviet occupation. During the 1956 uprising it was renamed to Magyar Ifjúság útja ("Avenue of Hungarian Youth"). The following year the governing communists changed the name to Népköztársaság út ("People's Republic Street"). The former name of Andrássy was restored in 1990, after the end of the communist era.

In September 2011, Secretary of State for Culture Géza Szőcs officially announced plans to build a new structure along Andrássy út close to City Park and near the existing Budapest Museum of Fine Arts and Budapest Art Hall (Műcsarnok). This building would house the collections of the current Hungarian National Gallery. This expanded plan, which would utilize the entire boulevard, is referred to as the Budapest Museum Quarter or Andrássy Quarter. However, since that announcement the plans changed several times and have now been reduced to three new museum buildings in and around the city park.

== Sections ==
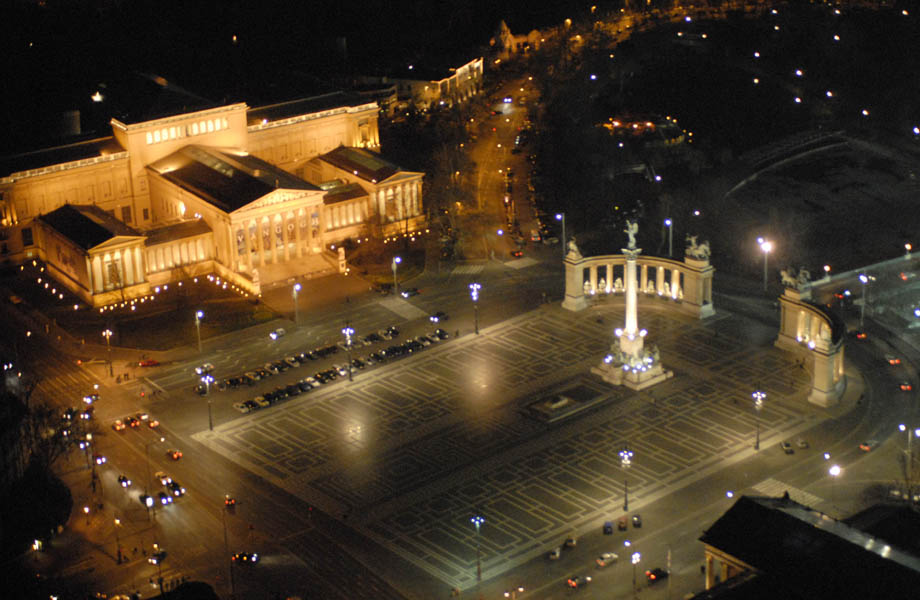
Hősök tere

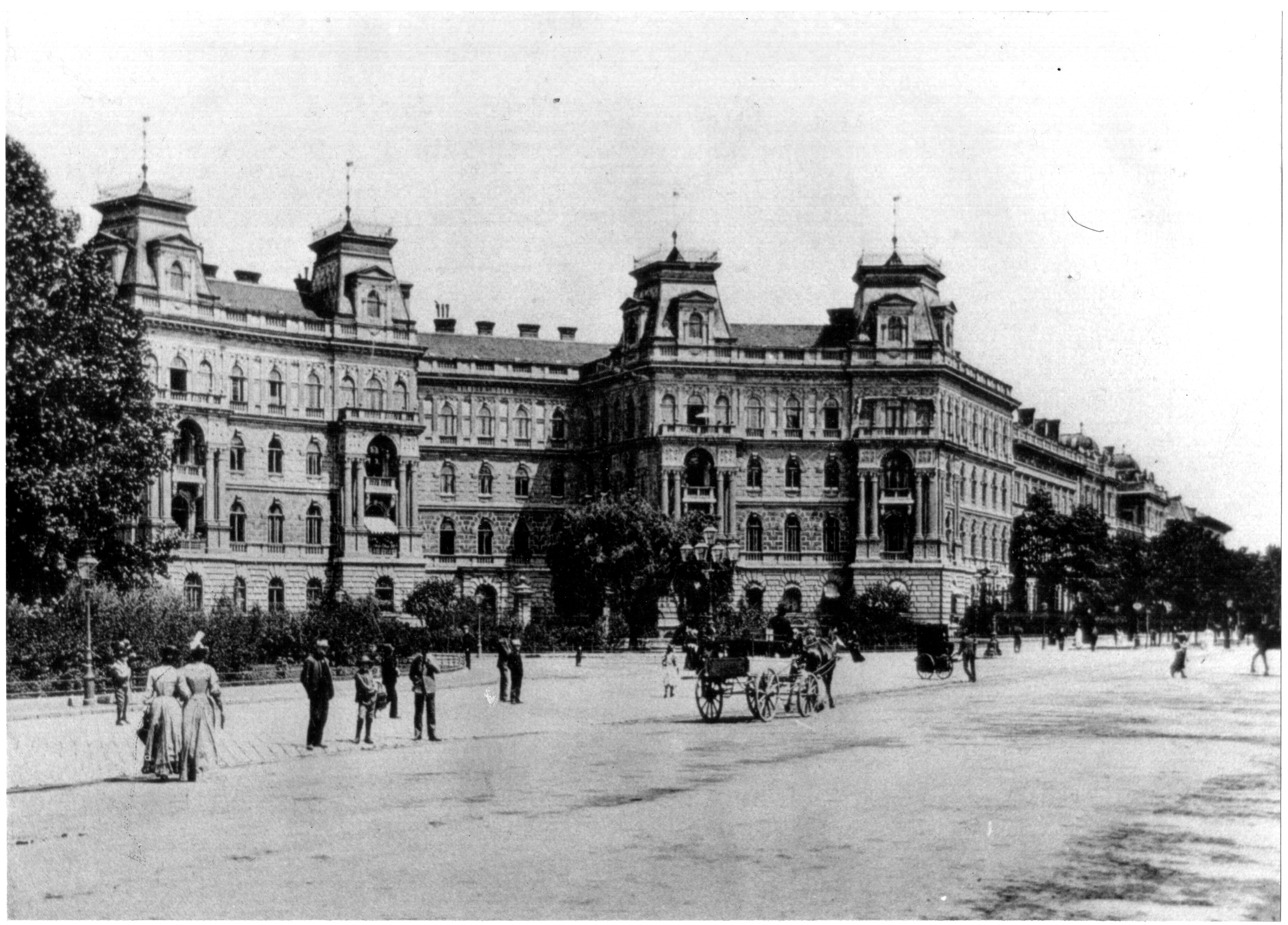
Kodály körönd 4 - 1895

Andrássy út consists of four main parts, from inside to outside as follows:

1. From Erzsébet tér to Oktogon: an urban-like part mostly for commercial purposes.
2. From Oktogon to Kodály körönd: widened with an allée, including residential areas and universities.
3. From Kodály körönd to Bajza utca: it is even more widened, and residential palaces are fronted by small gardens.
4. From Bajza utca to Városliget: the same width; villas encompassed by gardens, including a couple of embassies.

== Notable spots ==
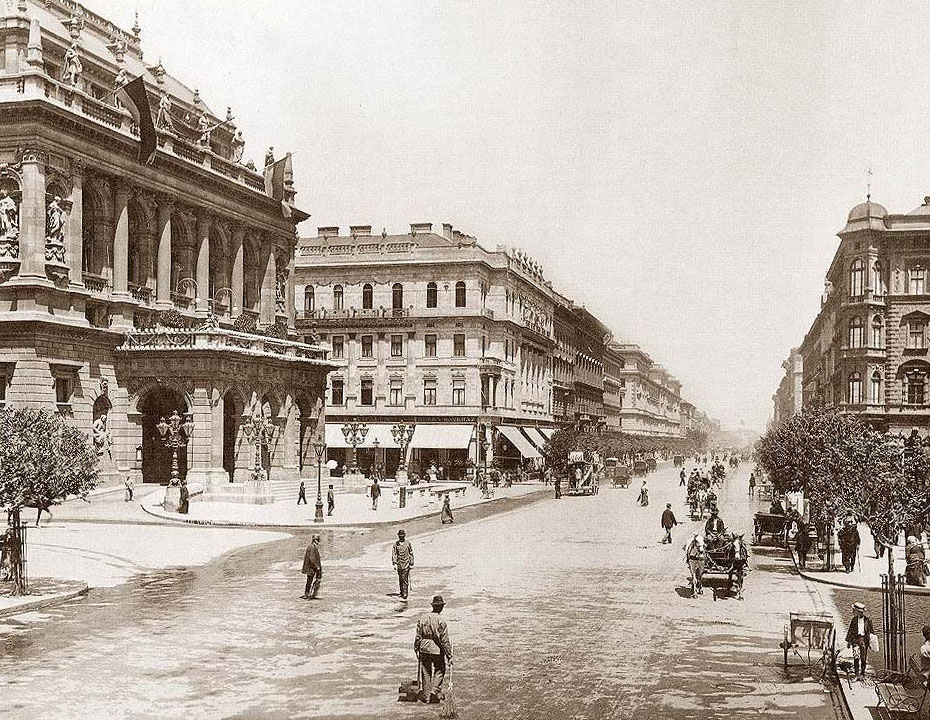
Andrássy Avenue with the Hungarian State Opera House (left side), 1896.

- Hungarian State Opera House
- Drechsler House
- The "Pest Broadway": a junction of Nagymező utca with four exquisite theatres at its four corners
- Franz Liszt square: a square with the Academy of Music and a multitude of cafés
- Oktogon: junction with Grand Boulevard
- Kodály körönd
- House of Terror (Terror Háza): commemorating the regimes of the German occupation of Hungary and the communist Hungarian People's Republic, and their victims (website, ÁVH)
- Franz Liszt Memorial House and the old Academy of Music
- Zoltán Kodály Memorial House
- College of Fine Arts
- Ferenc Hopp East-Asian Art Museum
- Heroes' Square: the entrance of the City Park, with the Millennium Monument, the Palace of Art (Budapest), the Museum of Fine Arts (Budapest)
- Recently opened world-famous luxury fashion shops like Dolce & Gabbana, Louis Vuitton, Armani, Gucci and more

== See also ==
- List of most expensive streets by city
