= Alignment =

Alignment may refer to:

== Archaeology ==
- Alignment (archaeology), a co-linear arrangement of features or structures with external landmarks
- Stone alignment, a linear arrangement of upright, parallel megalithic standing stones

== Biology and wellness ==
- Structural alignment, establishing similarities in the 3D structure of protein molecules
- Sequence alignment, in bioinformatics, arranging the sequences of DNA, RNA, or protein to identify similarities
  - Alignment program, software used in sequence alignment
- Chiropractic alignment, another term for chiropractic adjustment
- Coital alignment technique, a sex position

== Transportation engineering ==
- Road alignment, the route of a road, defined as a series of horizontal tangents and curves, as defined by planners and surveyors
- Railway alignment, three-dimensional geometry of track layouts
- Transfer alignment, a process for initializing and calibrating the inertial navigation system on a missile or torpedo
- Shaft alignment, in mechanical engineering, aligning two or more shafts with each other
- Wheel alignment, automobile wheel and suspension angles which affect performance and tire wear

== Arts and entertainment ==
- Music alignment, linking various music representations (sheet music, audio, video, MIDI, etc.) related to a given musical work
- Alignment level, an audio recording/engineering term for a selected point in the audio that represents a reasonable sound level
- The Alignment, a 2012 album by Samestate
- Alignments (album), a 2020 album by Double Experience
- Alignment (role-playing games), the moral and ethical perspective of the characters, monsters, and societies
  - Alignment (Dungeons & Dragons)
- Alignment of the body in a dance hall, see Direction of movement § Basic directions of movement with respect to the room

== Language and education ==
- Morphosyntactic alignment, the linguistic system used to distinguish between the arguments of transitive and intransitive verbs
- Typographic alignment, placement of printed matter relative to a page, column, margin, etc.
- Parallel text alignment, the identification of corresponding sentences in original and translated texts
- Ontology alignment, the process of determining correspondences between concepts
- Constructive alignment, a method of devising teaching activities that directly address learning outcomes

== Other uses in business and computing ==
- Strategic alignment, lining up an organization's strategy with its culture
- Business–IT alignment, how well an organization is able to use Information Technology to achieve objectives
- AI alignment, steering artificial intelligence systems towards the intended objective
- Data structure alignment, arranging data in computer memory to fit machine design, also known more simply as an alignment structure
- Partition alignment, letting address ranges of hard disk drive partitions start at certain physical boundaries or at multiples of units such as 4 KB or 1 MB

== Other uses ==
- Alignment of random points in statistics representing data points that lie on a relatively straight path
- Planetary alignment, in astronomy, a straight line configuration of three celestial bodies
- Alignment (Israel), political party from 1965 to 1992

== See also ==
- Realignment (disambiguation)
- Unaligned (disambiguation)
