= Siófok =

- Town
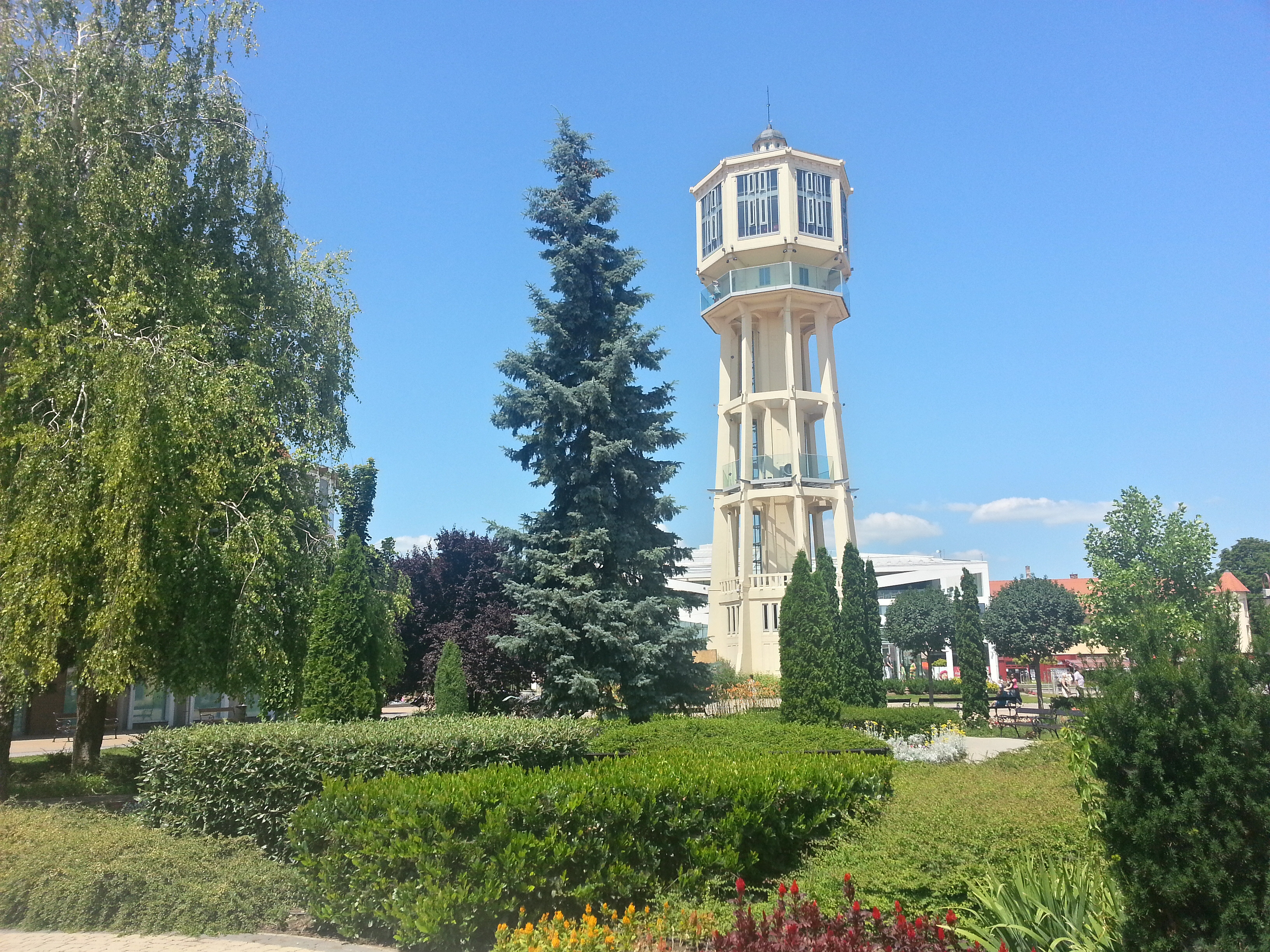
- Siófok main square

- Flag Coat of arms
- Nicknames: Capital of Lake Balaton; Summer Capital of Hungary
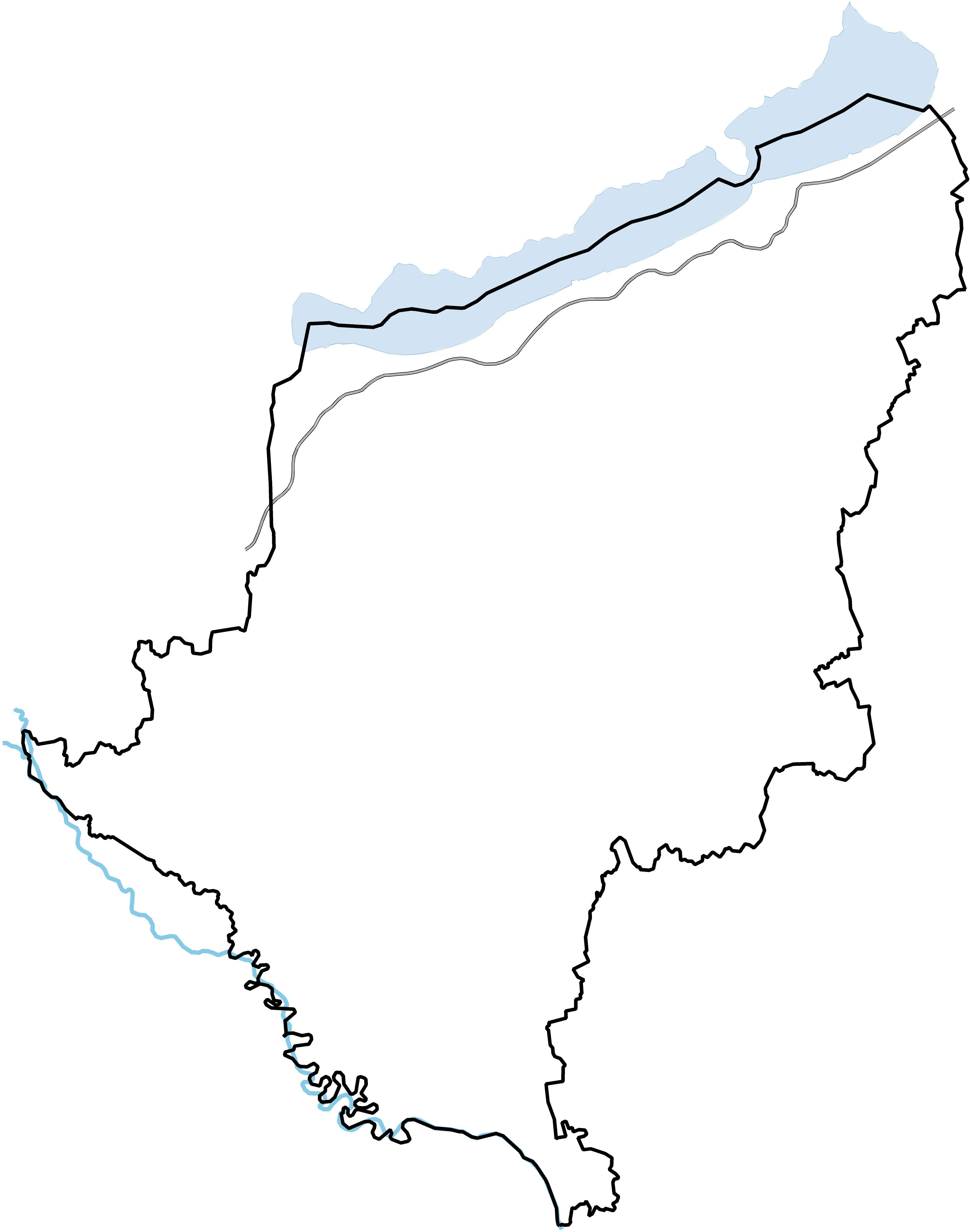
- Location of Siófok Siófok (Hungary)
- Coordinates: 46.92393°N 18.09012°E
- Country: Hungary
- Region: Southern Transdanubia
- County: Somogy
- District: Siófok
- RC Diocese: Kaposvár
- Market town status: 1865

Government
  - Mayor: Dr. Róbert Lengyel (Becsülettel Siófokért Egyesület)
  - Deputy Mayor: List: Péter Hamvas (Independent); Anita Potocskáné Kőrösi (Jobbik)
  - Town Notary: Dr Judit Kónyáné Zsarnovszky

Area
  - Total: 124.66 km^{2} (48.13 sq mi)

Population (2017)
  - Total: 25,468
  - Rank: 47th
  - Density: 204.30/km^{2} (529.13/sq mi)
- Demonym: siófoki

Population by ethnicity
  - Hungarians: 77.6%
  - Germans: 1.9%
  - Romani people: 1.7%
  - Romanians: 0.2%
  - Serbs: 0.1%
  - Slovaks: 0.1%
  - Polish: 0.1%
  - Ukrainians: 0.1%
  - Others: 0.8%

Population by religion
  - Roman Catholic: 39.9%
  - Greek Catholic: 0.4%
  - Calvinists: 7.7%
  - Lutherans: 1.9%
  - Jews: 0.1%
  - Other: 1.0%
  - Non-religious: 13.3%
  - Unknown: 35.8%
- Time zone: UTC+1 (CET)
  - Summer (DST): UTC+2 (CEST)
- Postal code: 8600
- Area code: (+36) 84
- Patron saint: Virgin Mary
- Motorways: M7
- Distance from Budapest: 104 km (65 mi) Northeast
- Airport: Siófok-Kiliti
- NUTS 3 code: HU232
- MP: Mihály Witzmann (Fidesz)
- Localities: List: Fokihegy; Balatonkiliti; Balatonszéplak; Sóstó; Töreki
- Surrounded by: List: Balatonendréd; Balatonszabadi; Balatonvilágos; Ságvár; Siójut; Zamárdi
- Website: Siófok Online

Siófok (Hungarian pronunciation: [ˈʃijoːfok]; German: Fock; Latin: Fuk) is a town in Somogy County, Hungary on the southern bank of Lake Balaton. It is the second largest municipality in Somogy County and the seat of Siófok District. It covers an area of about 124.66 km^{2} (48.13 sq mi) between Lake Balaton, the Mezőföld and the Outer Somogy-Hills. Lying at the mouth of the Sió Channel, it serves as the most important logistic station for goods between Lake Balaton and the River Danube.

The town is Hungary's second most popular holiday destination (after Budapest) due to its 17-kilometre-long (11-mile) coast, over 1,000 hotels, and plenty of bars, restaurants and nightclubs. Siófok is one of the richest municipalities of Hungary due to tourism. Hungarians often call the town "the capital of Lake Balaton", as it is the largest town on its shores and acts as the financial, cultural, media, commercial and tourist hub of the northern part of Somogy County and the southern shore of Lake Balaton.

== Etymology ==
Fuk was first mentioned as a village name in 1137 among the taxpayer communities. In the Tabula Hungariae (published in 1528) it appears as Fok. The word composition Siófok has been in use since 1790.

== History ==
=== Ancient times ===
The area of today's Siófok was already inhabited during the Roman Empire. The Roman conquest came here in the 1st century AD. The town lay on the route leading from Sopianae (today Pécs) through Tricciana (today Ságvár) to Arrabona (today Győr). According to recordings of Sextus Aurelius Victor from the 3rd to 4th century AD, Emperor Galerius built a sluice in 292 AD to drain the Lacus Pelso (the Latin name of Lake Balaton) in the area of Siófok and cleared forests.

=== Middle Ages ===
After the Hungarian Conquest, the settlement is mentioned in the Tihany Abbey's founding letter from 1055 as the following: "Rivulus namque, qui dicitur Fuk fluens" which means that a small brook, also called Fuk (today Sió) comes from the Lake Balaton. It also states that people had a passage through an older bridge and a ford as well.

After the Second Mongol invasion of Hungary, Fok was resettled.

In 1552, the Ottoman Empire took Fok and its surroundings. Siófok became a military outpost of the Ottomans who also built a fortress there. The Siófok Castle stood on the Granarium Hill near the place where the hospital is located today. In 1688, the region was liberated from the Ottoman occupation. Fok became the property of the Chapter of Veszprém, who settled people there, and in 1693 built a wooden church for them.

=== Habsburg times ===
At the time of Rákóczi's War of Independence, the famous Sió Defence Line of János Bottyán ended at the Fortress of Siófok. 1705 Francis II Rákóczi, Prince of Transylvania, donated a seal to the village which serves today as the coat of arms of Siófok.

The Baroque parish church was built in honor of the Immaculate Conception in 1736.

Major industrial progress began in the settlement during the 19th century. From 1810 the Transylvania-Adria Mail Coach Route already ran through Siófok. The first independent post office operated there since 1867.

Water regulation began in 1810 in the village. Then, based on the idea of József Beszédes, a water engineer, the bed of the Sió was cleaned, mills were re-operated, the water level of Lake Balaton dropped by one meter, recovering 51,000 acres of land from the water of Lake Balaton, and a further 6,000 acres of free land was created on the area of the Sió.

The establishment of the Balatoni Gőzhajózási Részvénytársaság ("Balaton Steam Shipping Company") in 1846 brought a significant change in the life of the settlement. Lajos Kossuth, who personally wrote the charter of the business association, and István Széchenyi as the president of the company played a huge role in it. In the same year, on September 21, the first steamboat on the Lake Balaton, Kisfaludy was released into the water.

In 1861 the railway between Buda and Nagykanizsa was officially opened. The train station was completed in 1863 (although the train stopped there since 1861), and a year later, the first port protected by pier was built. In the same year, a new sluice on the Sió was opened, to control the water level of Lake Balaton. The wooden sluice was replaced by an iron one in 1893. The settlement was awarded the rank of market town in 1865, which meant a permit for holding national fair. At that time, Siófok was still small with 200 houses and 1,500 residents.

In Siófok, or as many people called it at that time, Zsidófok (zsidó meaning "Jew" in Hungarian, according to sources, it was more a descriptive than a pejorative expression) once lived a large number of Jewish community. At the beginning of the 1860s, their number was 347, with 70 merchants living here, who played a major role in making the city an attractive resort in Europe.

In 1866, the first advertisement of the settlement was published in the Zala-Somogy Bulletin entitled Balatontavi Fürdő Siófok. Ignác Vég' tenant made a 12-year bathing lease contract with the Chapter of Veszprém, which has been extended for another 12 years. Built in 1878, the Magyar Tenger ("Hungarian Sea") bathhouse, created according to the plans of the Neuschlass construction company, in Swiss style, with an ornate façade, a hundred-person lounge, large windows that looked at the water, a double-deck viewing room, eighty bath cabins.

The Chapter of Veszprém began to parcel plots in 1885 and the construction of today's bathing area began. It is an interesting attraction of the Balaton landscape that the majority of the first villa owners were painters: Mór Than, Pál Vágó, Tivadar Feledi-Flesch (Mihály Zichy's son-in-law) and Artúr Tölgyessy's villa were in Siófok at this time.

In 1888 Gábor Baross granted state aid for the reorganization of the Balatoni Gőzhajózási Részvénytársaság ("Balaton Steam Shipping Company"). In 1889, the new passenger ship, the Kelén, was launched, and in 1891 Helka and the new Kelén were completed.

In April 1891, the Siófok Balatonfürdő Rt ("Siófok Balaton Bath Corporation") was founded which redeemed the bath rights from the Chapter of Veszprém and bought a 60-acre area to build houses and parks. From 1884 to 1905, the leader of the company was Henrik Glatz, founder of Franklin Irodalmi és Nyomdai Rt. Major hotels opened: Sió, Hullám, and later the Central Hotel.

In 1900, the Balatoni Halászati Részvénytársaság ("Balaton Fishing Company") started its operations. In the same year, the horse racing venue was built with a stand for 1,500 people. The town was also the destination of the most visited swimming and tennis competitions at Lake Balaton.

Because of its busy lifestyle, Siófok became a popular place of residence for several Hungarian artists and actors (e.g. Frigyes Karinthy, Gyula Krúdy, Árpád Latabár, Gyula Kabos).

In 1904 the new railway station building was completed. On October 23, 1906, the railway connection with Kaposvár was established through the Mocsolád-Tab-Siófok railway.

=== During the world wars ===
In August 1919, Siófok stood at the center of national politics for a short time, after Miklós Horthy, preparing for the suppression of the Hungarian Soviet Republic, moved to the area of Siófok and established his headquarters there.

At the end of World War II, the settlement was heavily damaged because the frontline got stuck for two months there.

During World War II, nearly 500 Jews were deported in 1944, of whom only 72 returned.

=== Soviet era ===
In 1947, within the framework of the construction works of the Sió Channel, the new sluice was completed, which made it possible for ships to move through. From 1950, the settlement belongs to Somogy County and in the same year it became a district seat.

On December 31, 1968, Siófok became a city. Before that, the 400-bed hospital was built, and then the cultural center and town library. In 1971, the M7 motorway from the direction of Budapest reached the settlement. Later, Siófok became the most famous corporate holiday destination.

=== After 1989 ===
After 1990, a local newspaper and open-air local television began to operate in the city. The first high-speed telegraphy World Championship was hosted in Siófok in 1995.

== Geography ==
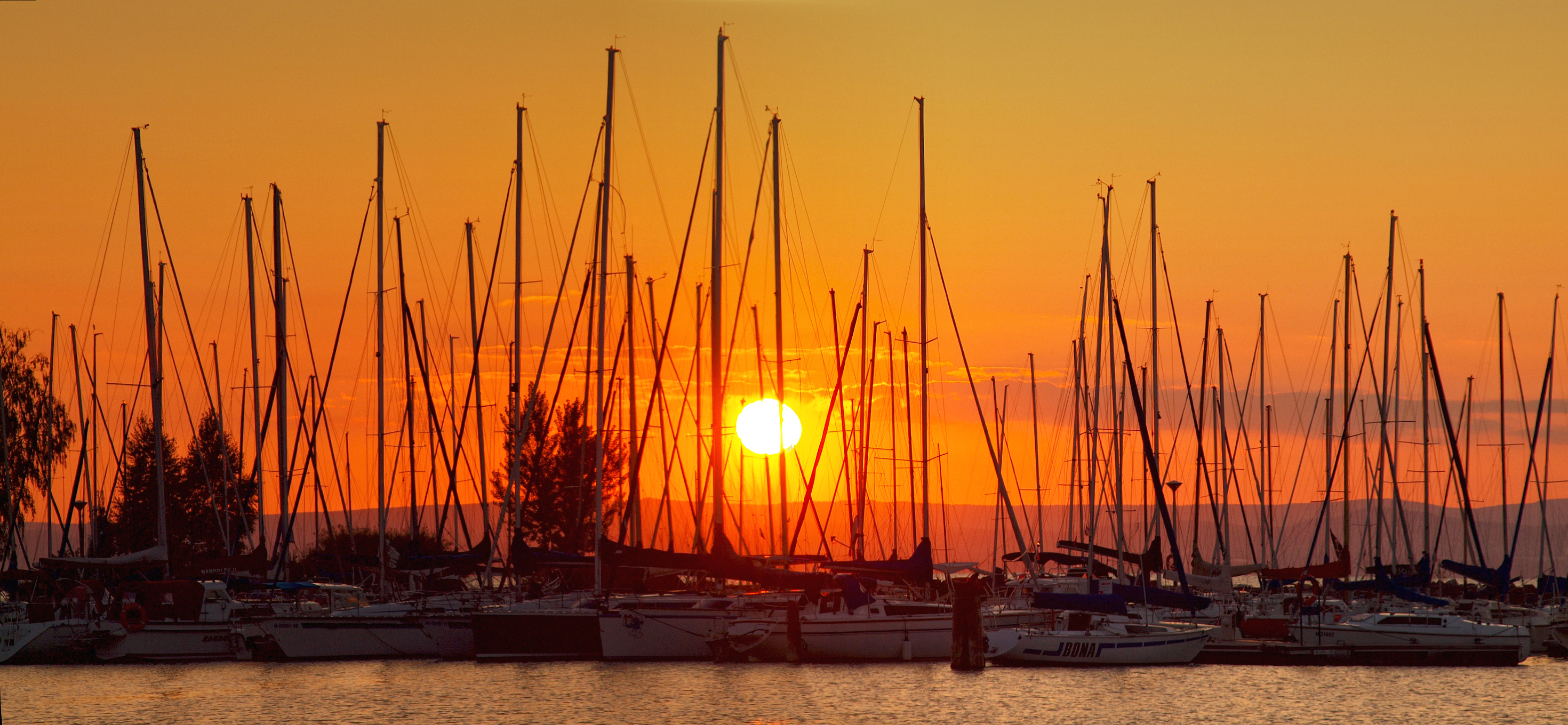
Siófok at sunset

In Siófok, the canal Sió flows out of the lake.

== Climate ==
Climate in this area has mild differences between highs and lows, and there is adequate rainfall year-round. The Köppen climate classification subtype for this climate is "Cfa" (humid subtropical climate).

Climate data for Siófok, 1991–2020
Month	Jan	Feb	Mar	Apr	May	Jun	Jul	Aug	Sep	Oct	Nov	Dec	Year
Record high °C (°F)	16.4 (61.5)	17.1 (62.8)	22.5 (72.5)	30.4 (86.7)	33.0 (91.4)	36.1 (97.0)	38.2 (100.8)	38.0 (100.4)	33.2 (91.8)	27.5 (81.5)	23.3 (73.9)	18.0 (64.4)	38.2 (100.8)
Mean daily maximum °C (°F)	2.7 (36.9)	5.2 (41.4)	10.5 (50.9)	17.0 (62.6)	22.0 (71.6)	25.8 (78.4)	27.8 (82.0)	27.5 (81.5)	21.8 (71.2)	16.0 (60.8)	9.2 (48.6)	3.7 (38.7)	15.8 (60.4)
Daily mean °C (°F)	0.2 (32.4)	1.7 (35.1)	6.3 (43.3)	12.2 (54.0)	17.2 (63.0)	21.1 (70.0)	22.9 (73.2)	22.5 (72.5)	17.5 (63.5)	11.9 (53.4)	6.3 (43.3)	1.4 (34.5)	11.8 (53.2)
Mean daily minimum °C (°F)	−2.1 (28.2)	−1.2 (29.8)	3.1 (37.6)	8.3 (46.9)	13.0 (55.4)	16.7 (62.1)	18.4 (65.1)	18.0 (64.4)	13.5 (56.3)	8.6 (47.5)	4.1 (39.4)	−0.6 (30.9)	8.3 (46.9)
Record low °C (°F)	−18.1 (−0.6)	−21.5 (−6.7)	−16.6 (2.1)	−3.1 (26.4)	2.0 (35.6)	8.4 (47.1)	11.2 (52.2)	10.3 (50.5)	5.0 (41.0)	−6.7 (19.9)	−10.3 (13.5)	−18.6 (−1.5)	−21.5 (−6.7)
Average precipitation mm (inches)	32.9 (1.30)	32.8 (1.29)	31.0 (1.22)	35.2 (1.39)	57.7 (2.27)	57.6 (2.27)	54.5 (2.15)	65.4 (2.57)	58.8 (2.31)	47.8 (1.88)	47.8 (1.88)	41.1 (1.62)	560.6 (22.07)
Average precipitation days (≥ 1.0 mm)	5.6	5.5	5.5	5.9	7.8	7.0	6.8	6.1	6.3	6.1	6.8	6.6	76.0
Average relative humidity (%)	83.3	78.7	73.3	67.3	68.2	68.7	67.2	68.0	73.2	79.1	83.9	85.3	74.7
Mean monthly sunshine hours	65	101	146	199	259	269	299	277	201	153	76	48	2,093
Source 1: OMSZ – Hungarian Meteorological Service
Source 2: NOAA

== Economy ==
Although Siófok is known for its tourism and service sector there are some companies working in production. Several smaller firms and farmers are in the agricultural industry, especially in fruit production. The town's famous products are the Sió fruit juices in several tastes. Their producer is the Sió-Eckes company (part of the German Eckes).

The Hungarian stationery producer SOMOGY REHAB, the Hungarian aluminium tent manufacturer Alutent, the Hungarian water supply infrastructure manufacturer Kristály, the Hungarian ready-mixed concrete producer TBG Interbeton (part of the Mexican Cemex) and the Hungarian plastic manufacturer Kaona are all based in the town.

The Norwegian cable producer Kongsberg Automotive and the Hungarian gas transport infrastructure manufacturer OV Industries have production facilities here.

Most of the companies can be found in the town's industrial park, Adria Ipari Park.

Siófok is home to the headquarter of Bahart (Balatoni Hajózási Zrt, English: Balaton Shipping Company) which is the owner and operator of 11 sailing ports around Lake Balaton (Balatonföldvár, Balatonszemes, Balatonlelle, Balatonboglár, Fonyód, Szigliget, Badacsony, Balatonfüred, Csopak, Alsóörs and Siófok), as well as provider of scheduled cruise ship voyages, ferries, water taxis and organizer of regattas.

=== Top companies ===
#	Company	Net income	# of Employees	Link
1	FGSZ Földgázszállító	326 million EUR	719	
2	DRV	62 million EUR	1,932	
3	Sió ECKES	34 million EUR	165	
4	SIÓMENTE KERESKEDŐHÁZ	24 million EUR	123	
5	OT Industries	23 million EUR	365	

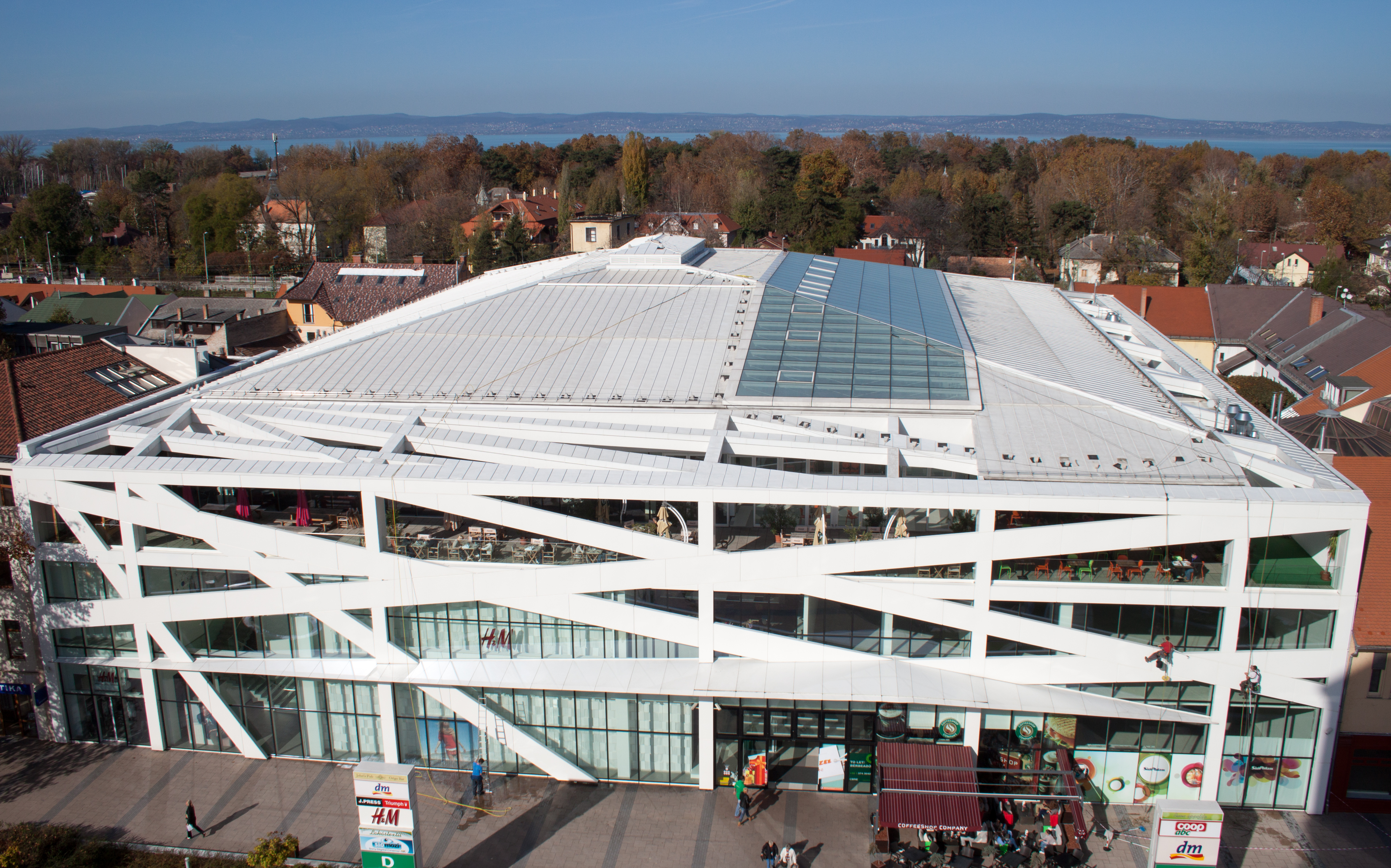
Building of the Sió Pláza shopping center

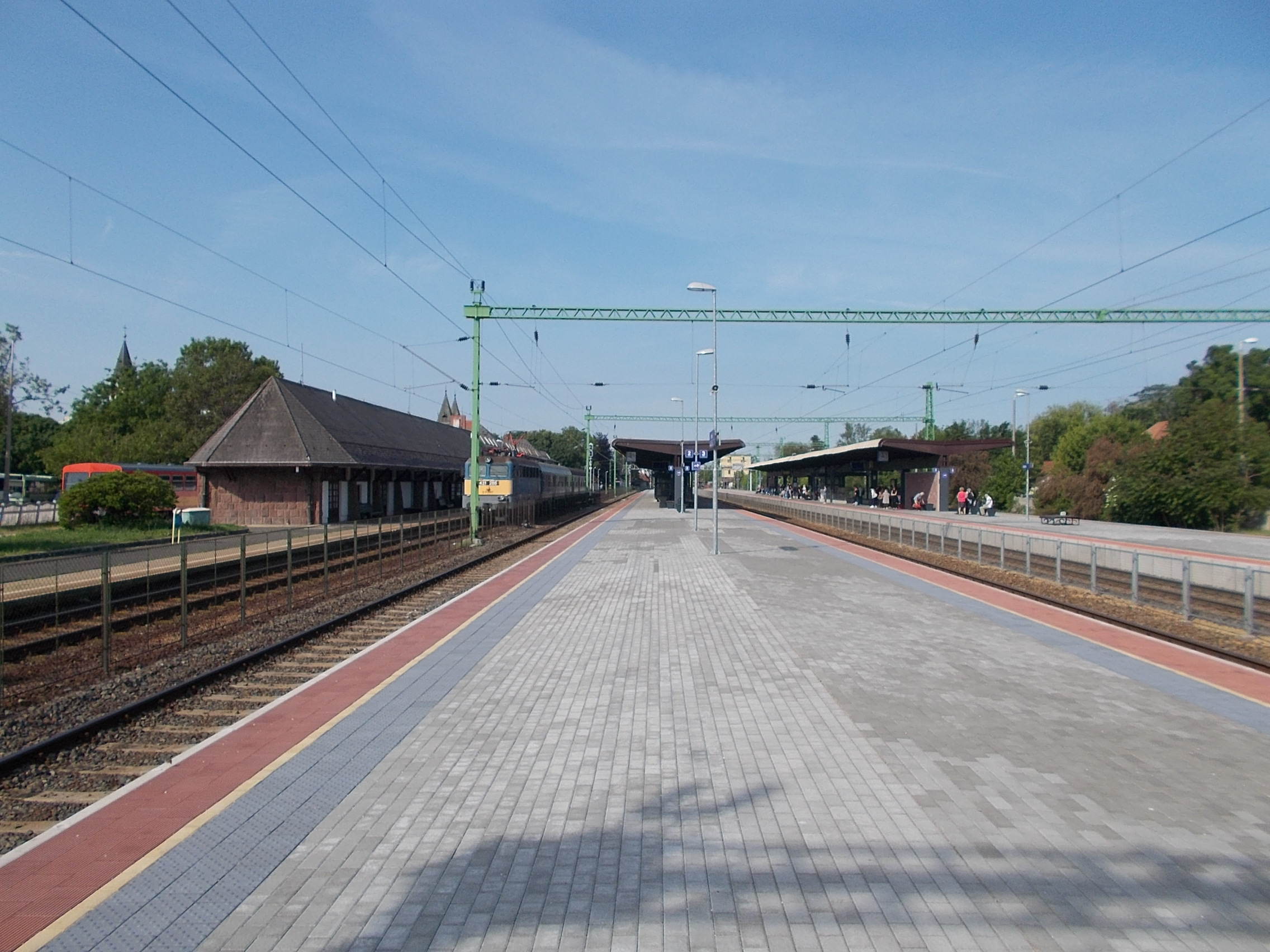
Siófok Railway Station

=== Services and public transportation ===
Siófok is reachable by train through the main Railway station or by regional buses operated by DDKK. Siófok-Kiliti airport is a small local airport serving only smaller airplanes. The city has 8 local buslines (2, 2K, 3, 4, 7, 16, 61, 64) which run every day and are operated by DDKK.

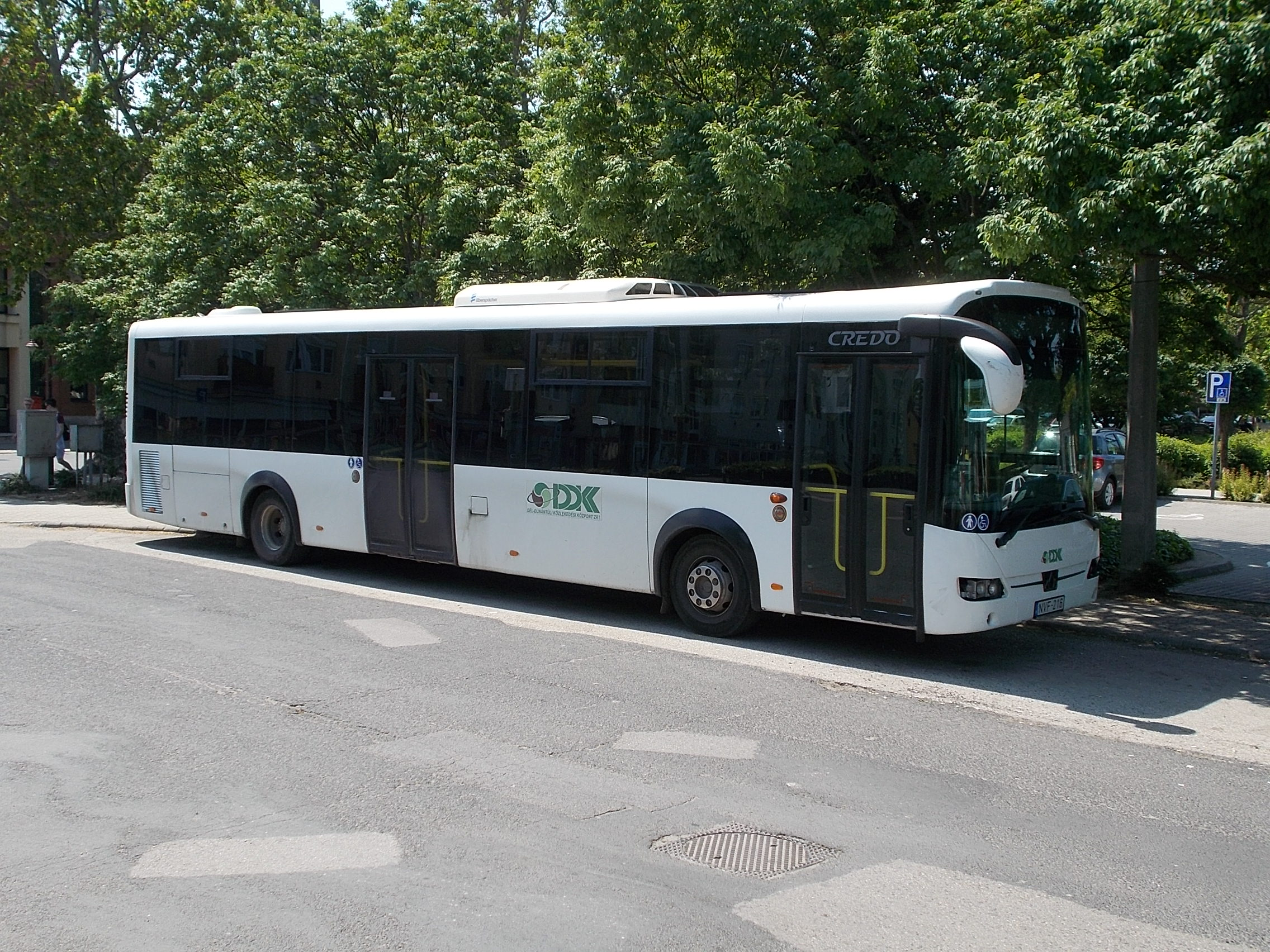
Local bus at Siófok bus station

== Demographics ==
The majority of the residents are Hungarian (77.6%). Notable minorities are Germans (1.9%) and Romani (1.7%). Others are all under 1%. The religious affiliation of the population shows a Catholic (Roman Catholic (39.9%) and Greek Catholic (0.4%)) majority, a Calvinist (7.7%) and a smaller Lutheran (1.9%) minority, while 13.3% is irreligious.

Population

Year	Pop.	±% p.a.
1870	3,897	—
1880	4,367	+1.15%
1890	4,533	+0.37%
1900	4,643	+0.24%
1910	5,216	+1.17%
1920	5,671	+0.84%
1930	7,158	+2.36%
1941	8,556	+1.64%

Year	Pop.	±% p.a.
1949	10,009	+1.98%
1960	13,189	+2.54%
1970	16,974	+2.56%
1980	20,125	+1.72%
1990	22,627	+1.18%
2001	22,684	+0.02%
2011	25,045	+1.00%
2018	25,461	+0.24%

== Sports ==
- BFC Siófok – football team
- Siófok KC – EHF Cup winner women's handball team

== Literature ==
Siófok appears in numerous literary works as location of the events, especially in the Hungarian literature. The most well-known examples are the novels Hosszúhajú veszedelem by Géza Gárdonyi and Sajkások serege by Gábor Lipták.

== Notable residents ==
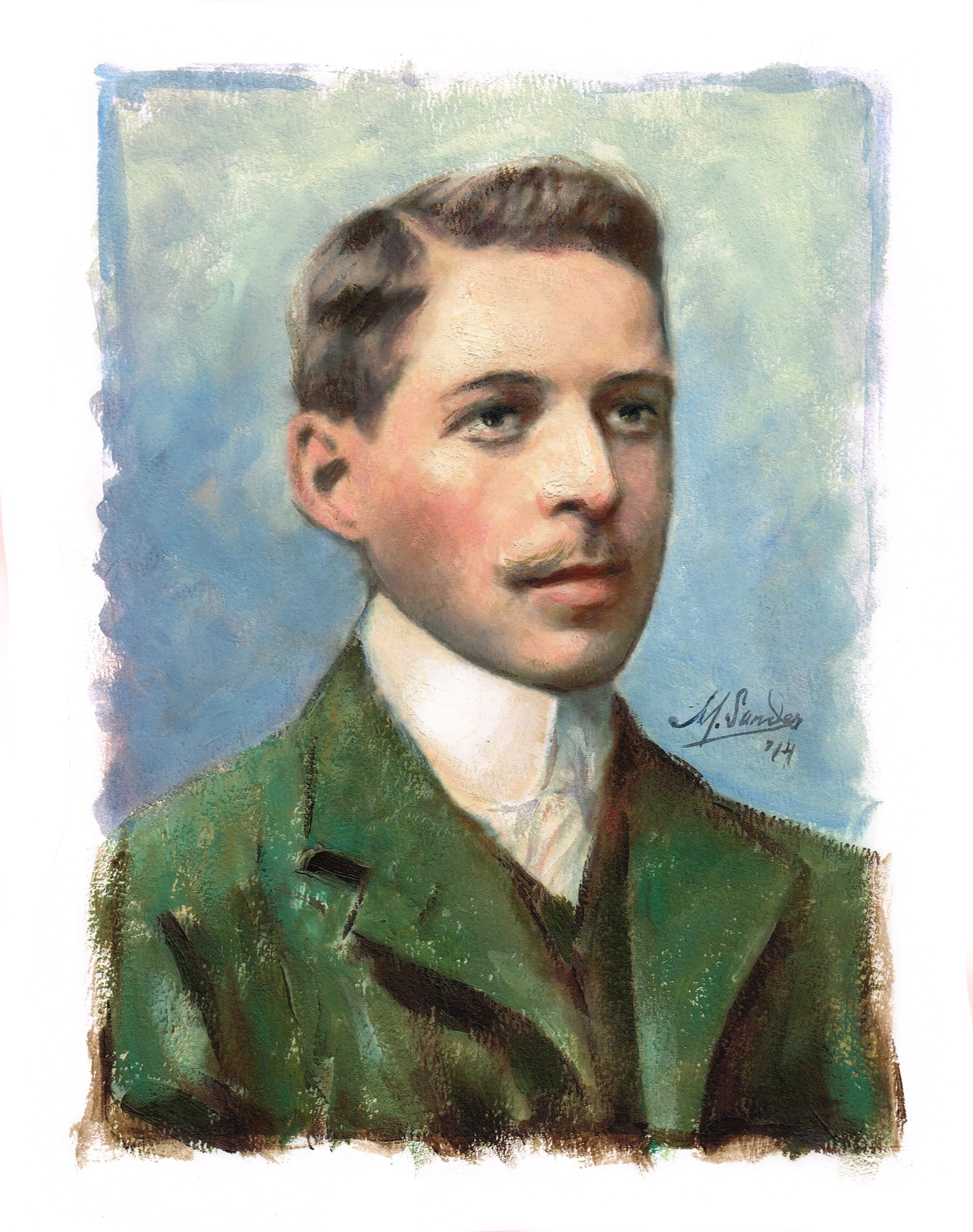
Portrait of Hungarian composer, Emmerich Kálmán by Estonian artist, Mart Sander. Kálmán is the most famous former resident of Siófok.

=== Science ===
- Géza Révész (1878–1955), Hungarian psychologist

=== Media/Art/Entertainment ===
- Ágota Bozai (born 1965), Hungarian writer
- John Hirsch (1930–1989), or Hirsch János, Hungarian-Canadian theater director
- Emmerich Kálmán (1882–1953), or Kálmán Imre, Hungarian composer of operettas
- Frigyes Karinthy (1887–1938), Hungarian author, playwright, poet, journalist, and translator
- Imre Varga (1923–2019), Hungarian renowned sculptor
- Lilla Vincze (born 1961), Hungarian singer

=== Sports ===
- Dávid Barczi (born 1989), Hungarian football player
- Csilla Borsányi, (born 1987), Hungarian tennis player
- Virág Csurgó (born 1972), Hungarian tennis player
- Réka Luca Jani (born 1991), Hungarian tennis player
- Vivien Léránt (born 1990), Hungarian handball player
- Kálmán Marvalits (1901–1982), Hungarian athlete
- Dániel Sallói (born 1996), Hungarian football player
- Mihály Szeróvay (born 1982), Hungarian football player
- Petra Teveli (born 1979), Hungarian marathon runner

== International relations ==
=== Twin towns ===
Siófok is twinned with:

- Oulu, Finland (since 1978)
- Landsberg am Lech, Germany
- Walnut Creek, California, United States
- Netanya, Israel
- Saint-Laurent-du-Var, France
- Poreč, Croatia
- Pärnu, Estonia
- Waldheim, Germany
- Brenna, Poland

== Gallery ==
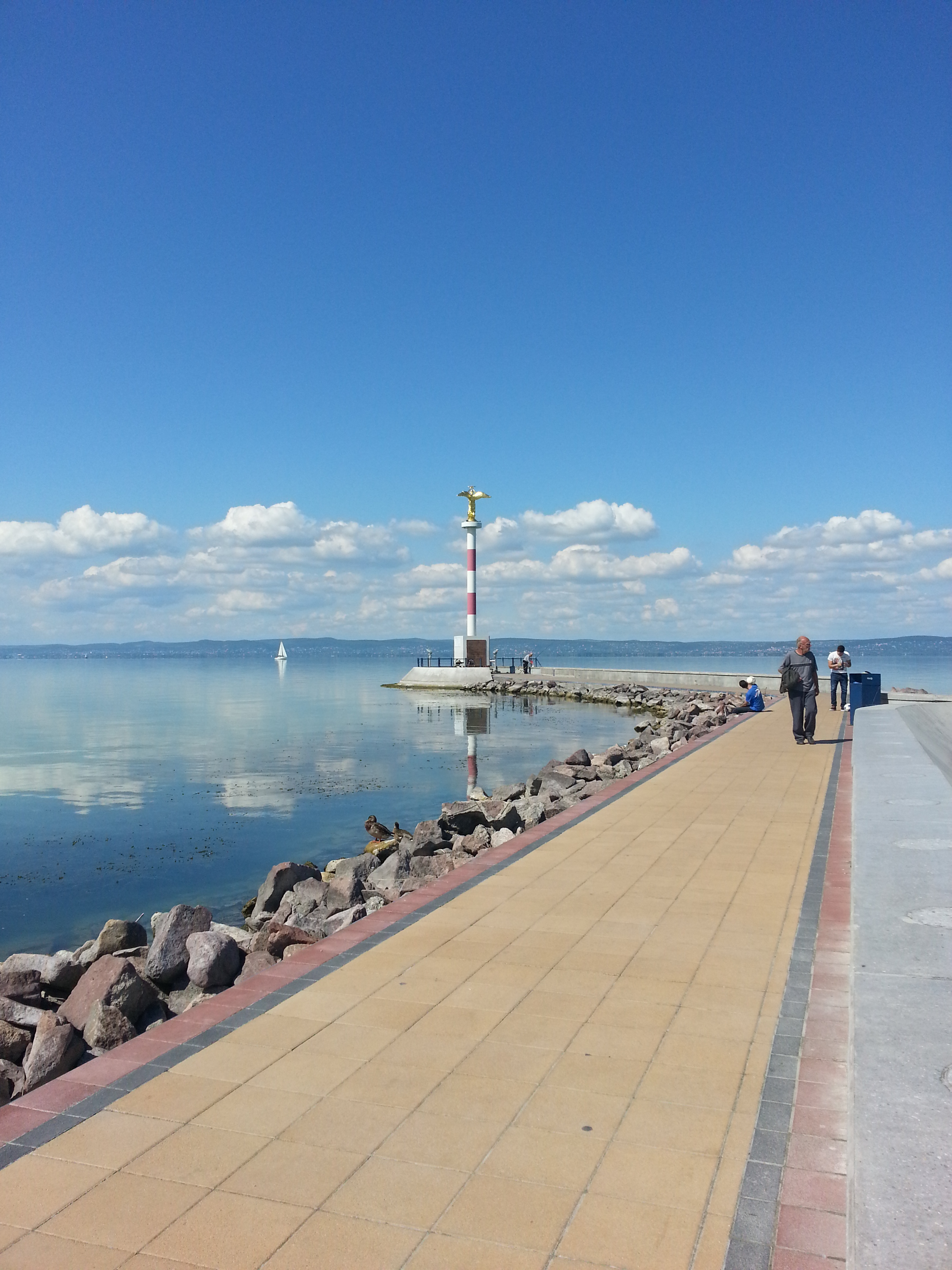

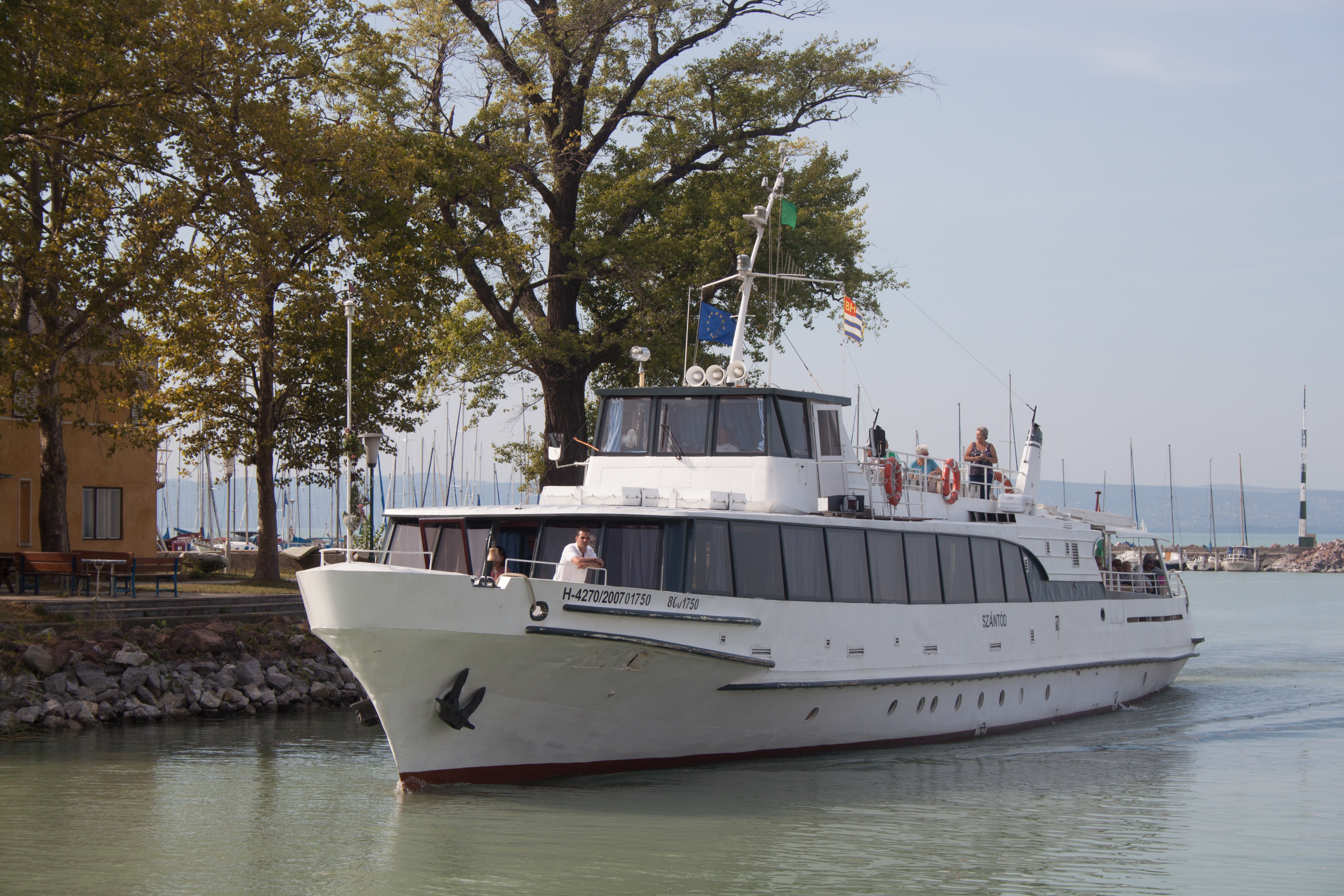

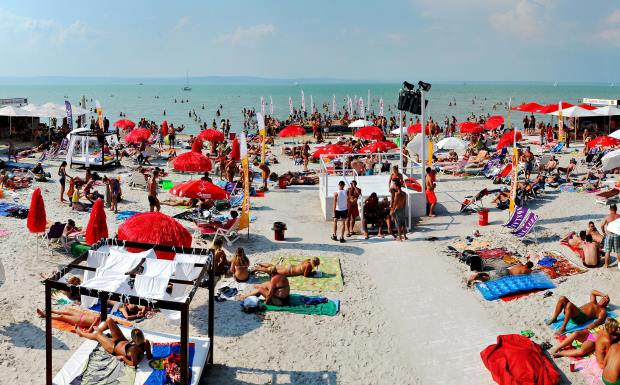
Plázs Siófok

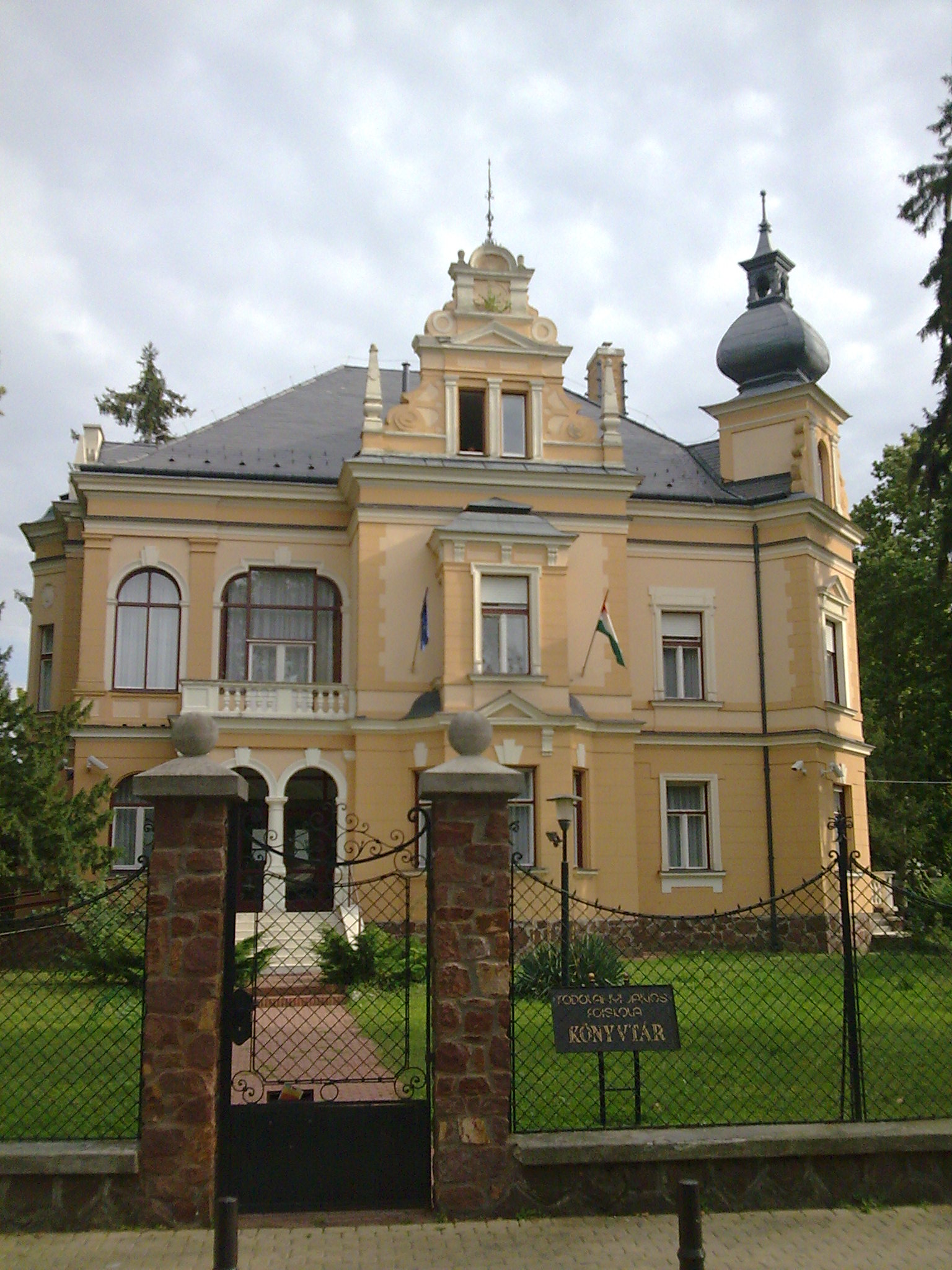

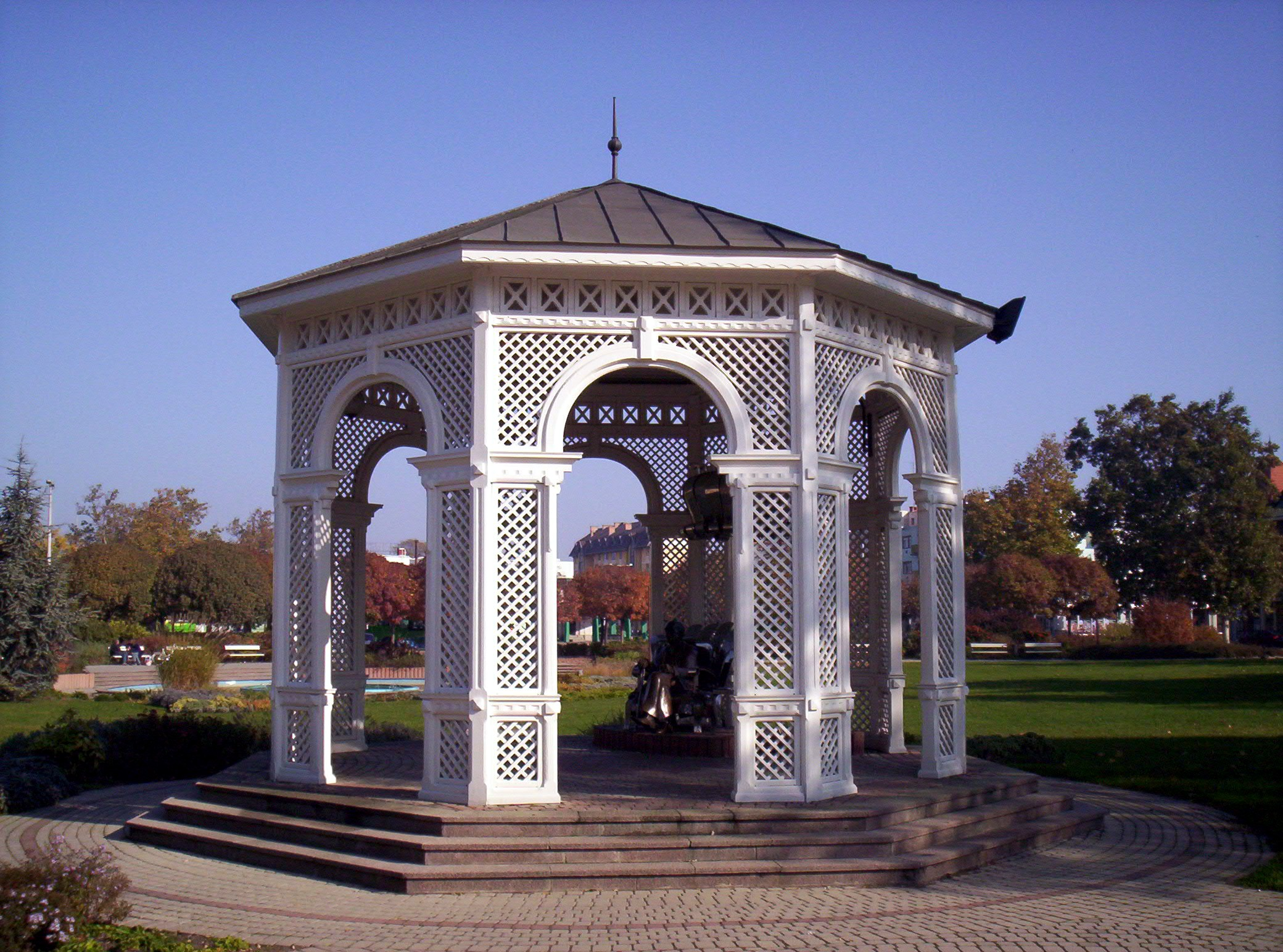

== Transportation ==
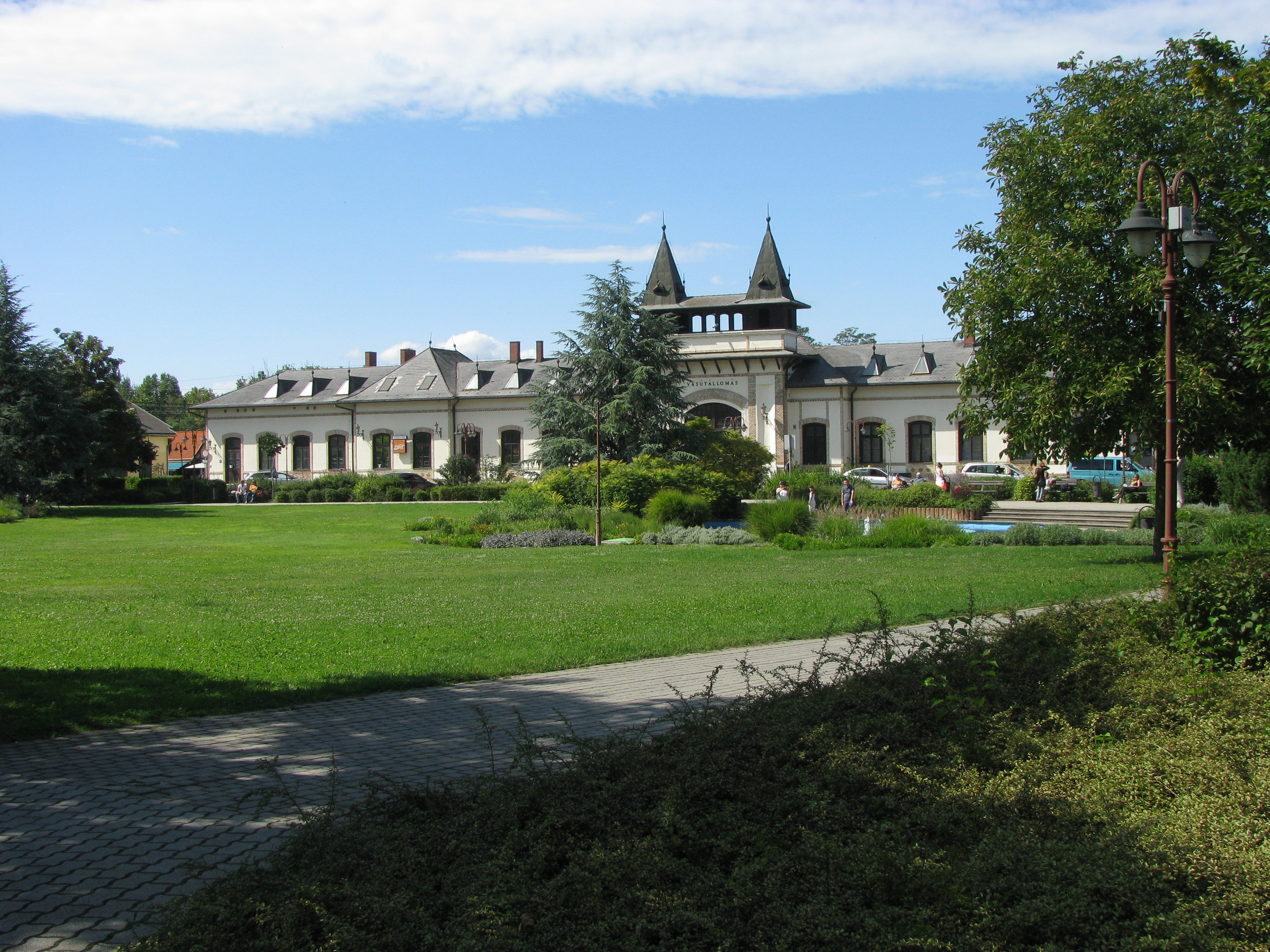
Building of the main train station in Siófok

=== Road transport ===
Siófok is considered to be a transportation hub. The town lies on the meeting point of the M7 motorway and the main roads, 65 and 6401. There are several local bus lines and long-distance buses also stop there. Taxi companies operate in the town as well.

- M7 motorway
- Main Road 7 ('Old 7')
- Main Road 65
- Main Road 6401

=== Rail transport ===
Siófok can be reached by train from three directions either on the Budapest–Murakeresztúr railway or on the Tab-Siófok railway. The town has six train stations: Szabadisóstó, Szabadifürdő, Sióvölgy, Siófok Main Station, Balatonszéplak felső and Balatonszéplak alsó. Siófok is easily accessible from the capital, Budapest, from the main train stations 'Déli Pályaudvar' and 'Kelenföld'. Székesfehérvár is also a main hub to catch connecting trains to Siófok.

- Budapest–Murakeresztúr railway
- Siófok–Tab railway

=== Water transport ===
Siófok is also famous for its ports for motor and sailing boats. Bigger tourist boats have their docks in the Port of Siófok.

- Port of Siófok
- Ezüstpart Yacht Port

=== Air transport ===
Siófok is home to a sport airport called Siófok-Kiliti Airport. No commercial airlines operate from here.

== See also ==
- Lake Balaton
- Museum of Minerals in Siófok
