= Align =

Align may refer to:

- The process of alignment (disambiguation)
- Align (album), an album released by the band Halifax
- Align Technology, a medical device company
- align and align*, environments that use the amsmath package used for arranging equations of multiple lines in LaTeX
- For controlling alignment in Wikipedia articles see Category:Positioning templates
