= The Alignment =

Studio album by Samestate
- Released: February 28, 2012
- Recorded: 2011–2012 in the United States (Note: According to the inner liner notes of the album.): "The Smoakstack" (Nashville, Tennessee)
- Genre: Christian rock, Christian alternative rock
- Length: 41:35
- Label: Sparrow
- Producer: Paul Moak, (Note: According to the inner liner notes of the album.); Pete Kipley (Note: According to the inner liner notes of the album.)

Singles from The Alignment
- 1. "Hurricane" Released: 2011; 2. "Shadows" Released: 2012

The Alignment is the first studio album by Christian alternative-rock band Samestate, released on February 28, 2012, by Sparrow Records.

== Critical reception ==
Professional ratings
Review scores
Source	Rating
Alpha Omega News (Elise F.)	B+
CCM Magazine (Andy Argyrakis)	3/5 stars
Christian Music Zine (Joshua Andre)	4/5 stars
Christianity Today (Joel Oliphint)	3/5 stars
Cross Rhythms (Jamie Maxwell)	8/10 stars
Indie Vision Music (Jonathan Andre)	3/5 stars
Jesus Freak Hideout (Roger Gelwicks)	3.5/5 stars
Louder Than the Music (Jono Davies)	4.5/5 stars
New Release Tuesday (Logan Leasure)	4.5/5 stars

Elise F. of Alpha Omega News wrote that "For a debut, however, The Alignment was surprisingly enjoyable to listen to from start to finish, and with time I hope they continue to develop their skill and challenge themselves." In addition, Elise declared that she "was impressed with Samestate’s debut, and, having seen the guys live, I have no doubt of their passion and sincerity for their music. They have great potential, and I, for one, can’t wait to hear them grow from here!"

CCM Magazine's Andy Argyrakis wrote that Samestate has "a knack for catchy choruses and mighty melodies, along with a lyrical bent of leading listeners to embrace God's plan for their lives."

Christian Music Zine's Joshua Andre wrote that "the band have crafted 10 songs of southern goodness". In addition, Andre noted that "Their alternative rock sound certainly brings a flair and a creativity to the table, and for me to say I was captivated during the 40 minute musical and lyrical journey is an understatement by far. It’s hard not to draw comparisons between Dalton’s raw and unique voice with Bear Rineheart’s [sic], from Needtobreathe, one of the first things striking me as special about this Sparrow Records group."

Christianity Today's Joel Oliphint wrote that "Samestate has enough hooks and ardor to make a name for itself."

Cross Rhythms' Jamie Maxwell wrote that "In one sense it all sounds fairly familiar: the songs are fairly standard driving rock numbers that are pleasantly anthemic [sic] without being outstanding, but while Samestate don't bring much that is completely new, they seem to do the stadium-style rock thing better than most. The musicianship here is excellent and the production is of a high standard. Singer Dalton Diehl has a distinctive quality to his voice, intriguingly reminiscent of Marcus Mumford, which lends credence to the well put-together lyrics."

Indie Vision Music's Jonathan Andre wrote that "Samestate’s debut record incorporates a little imagery and symbolism, hope and passionate song-writing, motivation to love our creator and our fellow mankind, but also to understand the full love of Christ with His creation. These ten songs are heartfelt, providing an avenue of reflection and reminders of Christ in a world where little reminders are certainly needed. On a similar vein to either Switchfoot, Aaron Gillespie or Needtobreathe; The Alignment certainly stands tall along with Crave, I Choose Jesus and The Rescue (For King and Country, Moriah Peters, and Adam Cappa respectively) as one of the most compelling debut projects of 2012!"

Jesus Freak Hideout's Roger Gelwicks wrote that "Good radio pop is hard to come by, but when a band performs even a little bit above standard expectations, it's a sound to behold. Enter Sparrow Records signees [sic] Samestate; with The Alignment already in full force, it juggles the line between complacent musicmaking [sic] and innovative aptitude, but fortunately for listeners, it opts more for the latter than the former." Furthermore, Gelwicks concluded, when he noted "The highlights of Samestate's sound become more and more noticeable upon each listen, and there's evident potential here for a glowing record on the horizon. When great talent and great songwriting align, it reaches beyond just what the radio expects to broadcast; casual radio pop fans will ravenously devour Samestate's inclinations in The Alignment, but with the band's debut in the books, their next venture as a signed band will hopefully be something unmistakably their own."

Louder Than the Music's Jono Davies wrote that "Every album has different styles of songs but on this album there is actually a rhythm and feel to it that keeps the flow of the whole album together. There are some truly stunning tracks on this album, I mean truly stunning, from the heartfelt raw tracks to the out and out anthems. This what Samestate are about and what a great way to be introduced to this very talented band that really know how to write a beautiful set of songs."

New Release Tuesday's Logan Leasure wrote that "What Samestate has managed to do is successfully make worship relevant. In a generation of Christian bands that seems to have shifted their focus on making it big in the mainstream, Samestate--whose roots lie in Kansas City--has decidedly stayed true to the profound passion that they so evidently have for their faith. Not only has Samestate crafted a record that is highly impressive for a debut, but they also have put out arguably one of the best releases of the year."

== Track listing ==
CD track order
No.	Title	Writer(s)	Producer (Note: According to the inner liner notes of the album.)	Length
1.	"Realign"	Dalton Diehl	Paul Moak	4:05
2.	"Sons and Daughters"	Diehl & Joshua Silverberg	Moak & Pete Kipley	3:52
3.	"Hurricane"	Diehl	Moak	4:27
4.	"Shadows"	Diehl & Bear Rinehart	Moak	4:09
5.	"King"	Diehl & Christopher Stevens	Moak	3:39
6.	"Upside Down"	Diehl	Moak	4:41
7.	"Love Remembers You"	Diehl & Ben Glover	Moak & Kipley	3:59
8.	"Wake Me Up"	Diehl & Glover	Moak	3:48
9.	"Hearts Like Fire"	Nate Company, Joshua Crosby & Diehl	Moak & Kipley	4:01
10.	"Symphonies"	Diehl	Moak	4:54
Total length:				41:35
