= IFA Group =

German automotive parts manufacturer

IFA Holding GmbH

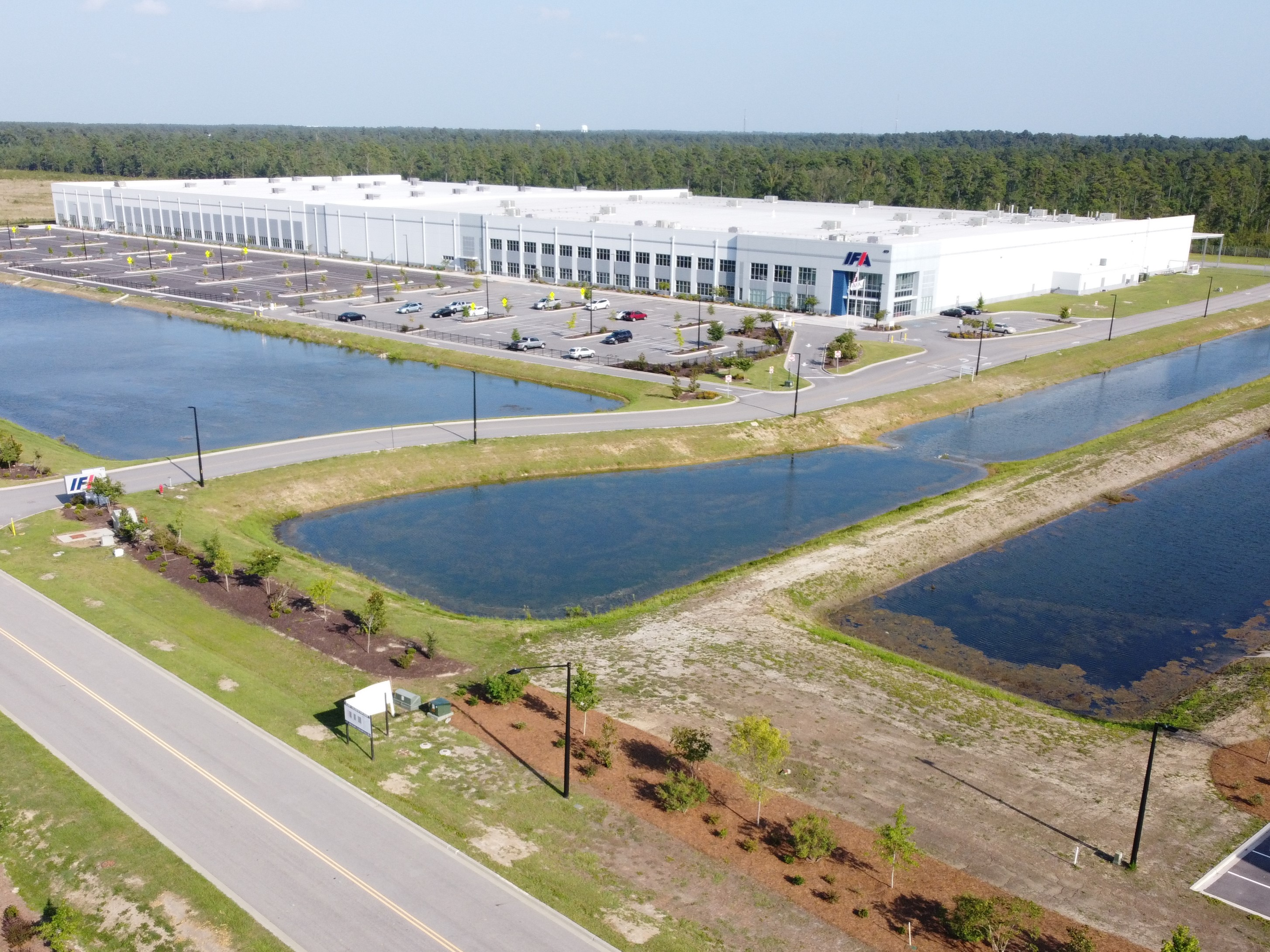
- Company type: Gesellschaft mit beschränkter Haftung
- Industry: Automotive industry
- Founded: 1959; 67 years ago in Haldensleben, Germany
- Headquarters: Haldensleben
- Key people: Stefan Bultmann; Jan-Christoph Maser
- Revenue: 630 million euros (2022)
- Number of employees: 2,300 (2024)
- Website: ifa-group.com

IFA Group develops, produces and sells cardan shafts and side shafts for the automotive industry. It consists of eight companies and has production plants in Europe, Asia and the US (as at the end of 2022). The group's holding company is based in Haldensleben, Germany.

== Products ==
The IFA Group offers longitudinal shafts, side shafts and other components for car manufacturers. The Group has been active in the field of longitudinal shafts for many years. Since 2017, it also produces side shafts.

== Organization ==
At the end of 2022, the IFA Group consisted of eight companies, four of which are based outside of Germany. The Austrian subsidiary was liquidated in the following year. IFA Holding GmbH manages the group and publishes the consolidated financial statements. The company has locations in Germany (Haldensleben, Hanau), Poland (Ujazd, Katowice), the United States (Charleston, South Carolina; Novi, Michigan) and China (Shanghai). At the end of 2023, the Group employed a total of 2,300 people, making it the largest automotive supplier in Saxony-Anhalt.

== History of the company ==
=== From the foundation to 1990 ===
The VEB IFA-Gelenkwellenwerk Haldensleben, known as "IFA-Gelenkwelle", was founded in 1959. It was a supplier to the GDR vehicle and mechanical engineering industry, which belonged to the VEB IFA-Kombinat Nutzfahrzeuge Ludwigsfelde, which in turn was part of the Industrieverband Fahrzeugbau der DDR (IFA). Until the reunification of Germany, the plant produced components for cars and agricultural machinery, including for the axle drive of the IFA W50 truck. There were also customers in West Germany, such as Klöckner-Humboldt-Deutz and Fendt.

=== The post-reunification years and expansion ===
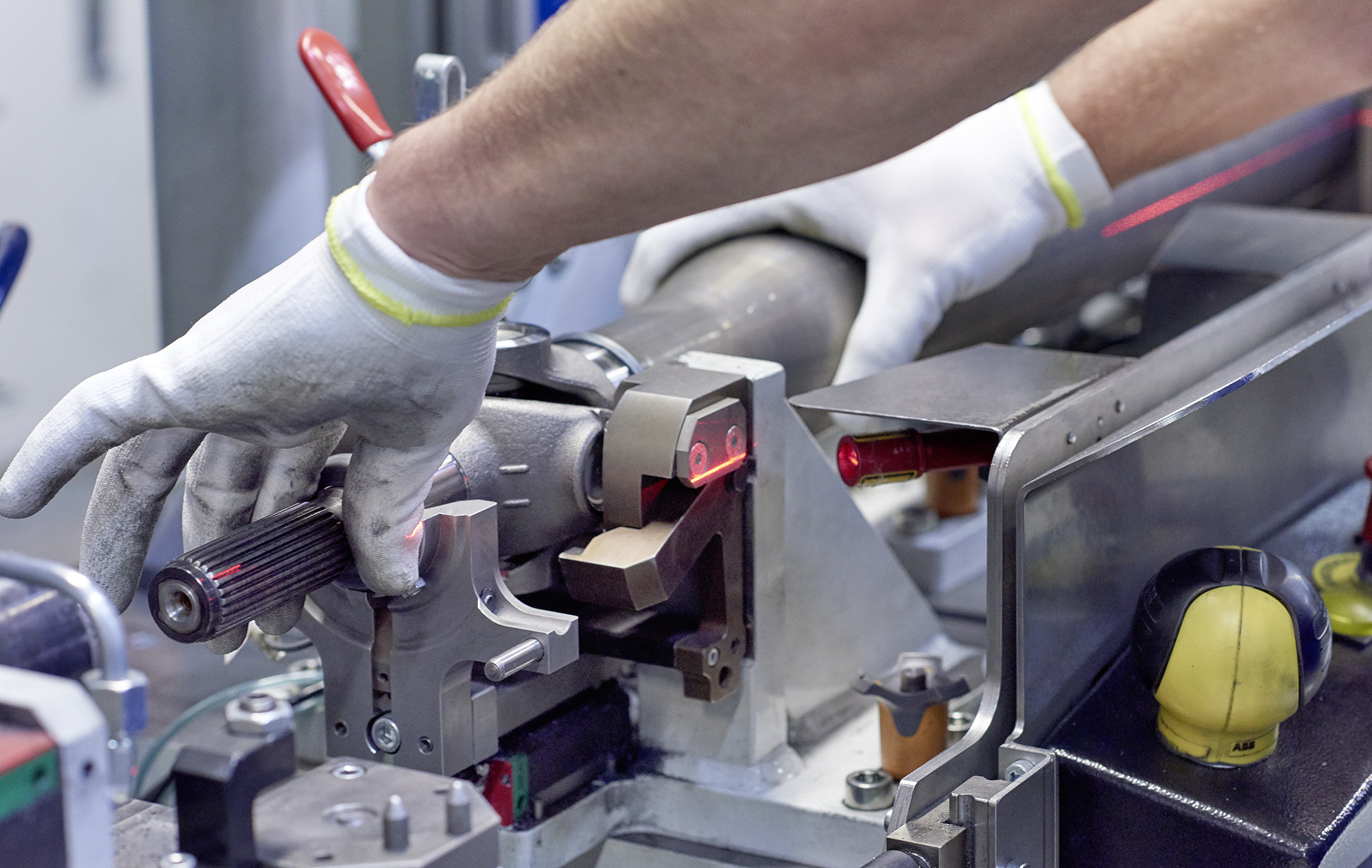
Working at the IFA Group plant in Haldensleben in 2016: producing a universal joint for a longitudinal shaft. The laser assists in aligning the splines.

The company was transformed into a GmbH and managed by the Treuhandanstalt. Heinrich von Nathusius took over the company in 1992. At the same time, Volkswagen was acquired as a customer. In the following years, other manufacturers such as BMW, DaimlerChrysler, Audi and Porsche were added. The company's own capacities were expanded in 2002 with the opening of another cardan shaft plant in Gardelegen. In addition, the company entered into a strategic alliance with the Japanese company NTN in 2006. In 2009, the company acquired a majority stake in Tognum's propeller shaft division Rotorion (Tognum initially retained a 25 percent stake); this involved the integration of a Rotorion plant in Charleston, South Carolina. Five years later, the IFA Group opened a production facility in Shanghai. Finally, in 2016, the company took over Daimler's sideshaft production and opened a sideshaft plant in Poland the following year.

=== Crisis and turnaround ===
In 2018, it became known that the von Nathusius family was looking for a buyer for the IFA Group. The following year, the banks obtained the transfer of the von Nathusius family's shares in the company to the restructuring trustee Arndt Geiwitz. Overambitious growth plans, start-up difficulties at the new Polish plant and problems following the expansion of existing production facilities were considered to be the causes of the crisis. A restructuring manager was appointed at the beginning of 2019.

At the end of 2021/beginning of 2022, the IFA Group was acquired by the Munich-based investment company AEQUITA. Thanks to cost reductions, process and production changes and several major customer orders, the Group returned to profit in 2023.

== See also ==
- Kongsberg Automotive, Norwegian automotive parts manufacturer
