= Realignment =

Realignment may refer to:

- Political realignment, or realigning election, especially in US history and political science
- Realignment plan, also known as Israeli convergence plan
- Realignment (sports)
- Wheel alignment
- "Re-Align", song by Godsmack from the album Faceless

== See also ==
- Public Safety Realignment initiative
- Alignment (disambiguation)
- Unaligned (disambiguation)
