= Museum of Minerals in Siófok =

Private museum in Hungary

Mineral Museum (Hungarian: Ásványmúzeum) is a museum in Siófok, Hungary. It was opened in 1986 in the centre of the city. It is a private museum with the protection of the Hungarian National Heritage label. In this museum you can see 3000 pieces out of their total (12,000) collection.

It includes examples most notably from the Carpathian Basin. There are a lot of outstanding minerals from Transylvanian mining areas. There are some objects from distant regions of the world as well.

The Kövecses Family has been collecting minerals for 4 generations. The museum became protected by the Hungarian State as a national heritage in 1986, which was renewed and extended again in 2016.

In 2001, museum owner and founder Lajos Kövecses-Varga discovered a new mineral, called (kochsandorite). The first found samples of that mineral are also exhibited here.

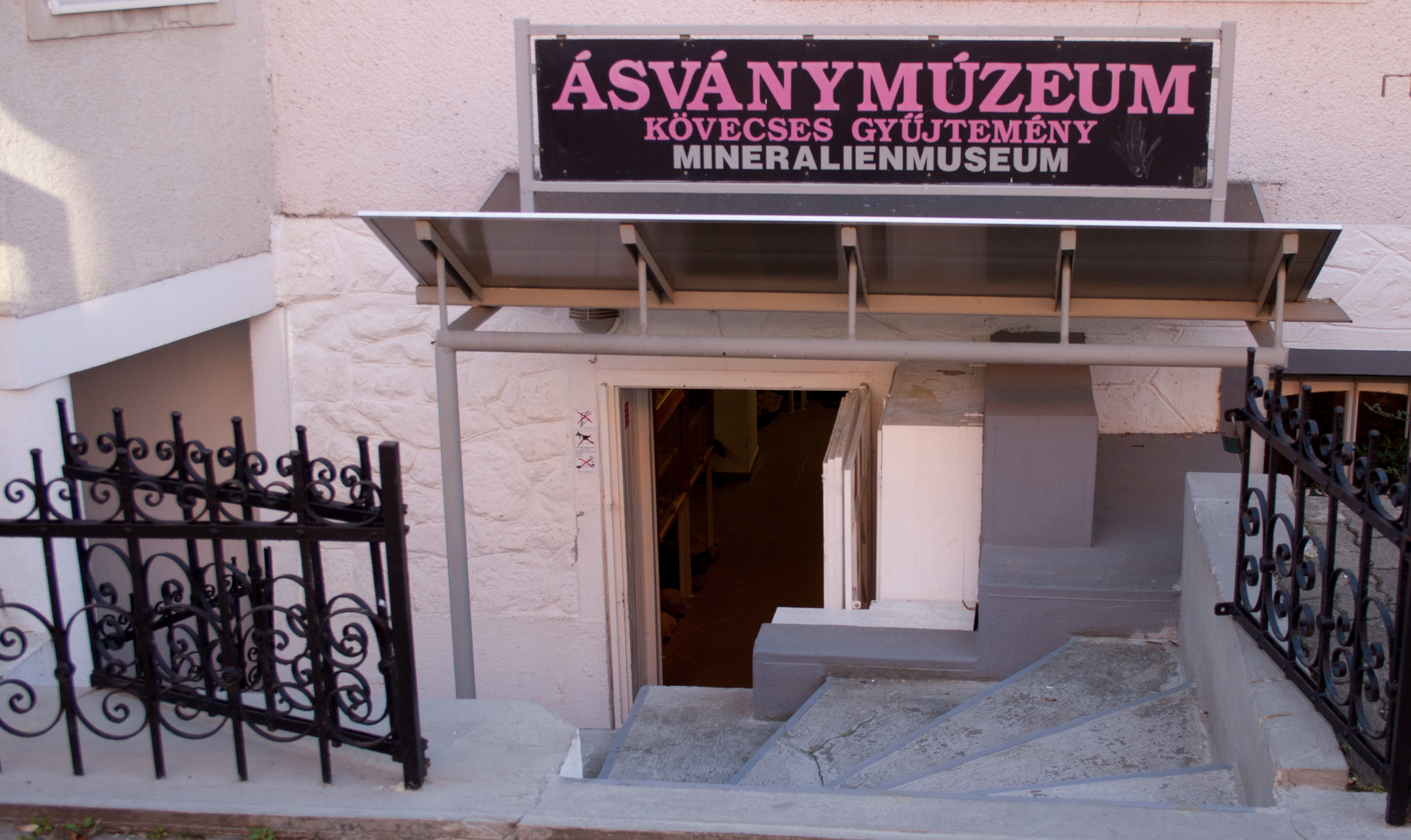
Entrance of the museum at Imre Kálmán promenade.

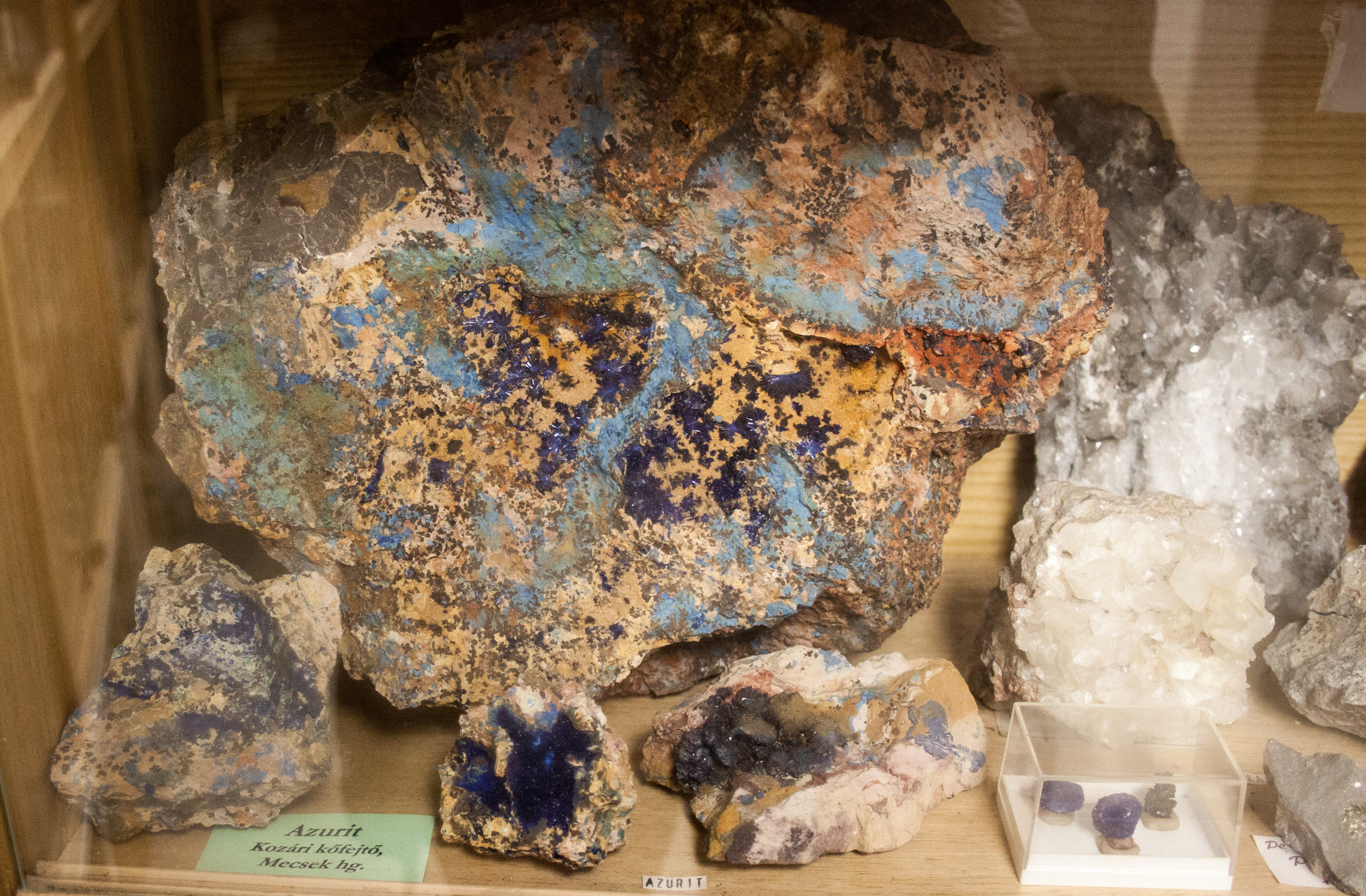
Azurite from near Kozármisleny, at the Mecsek.

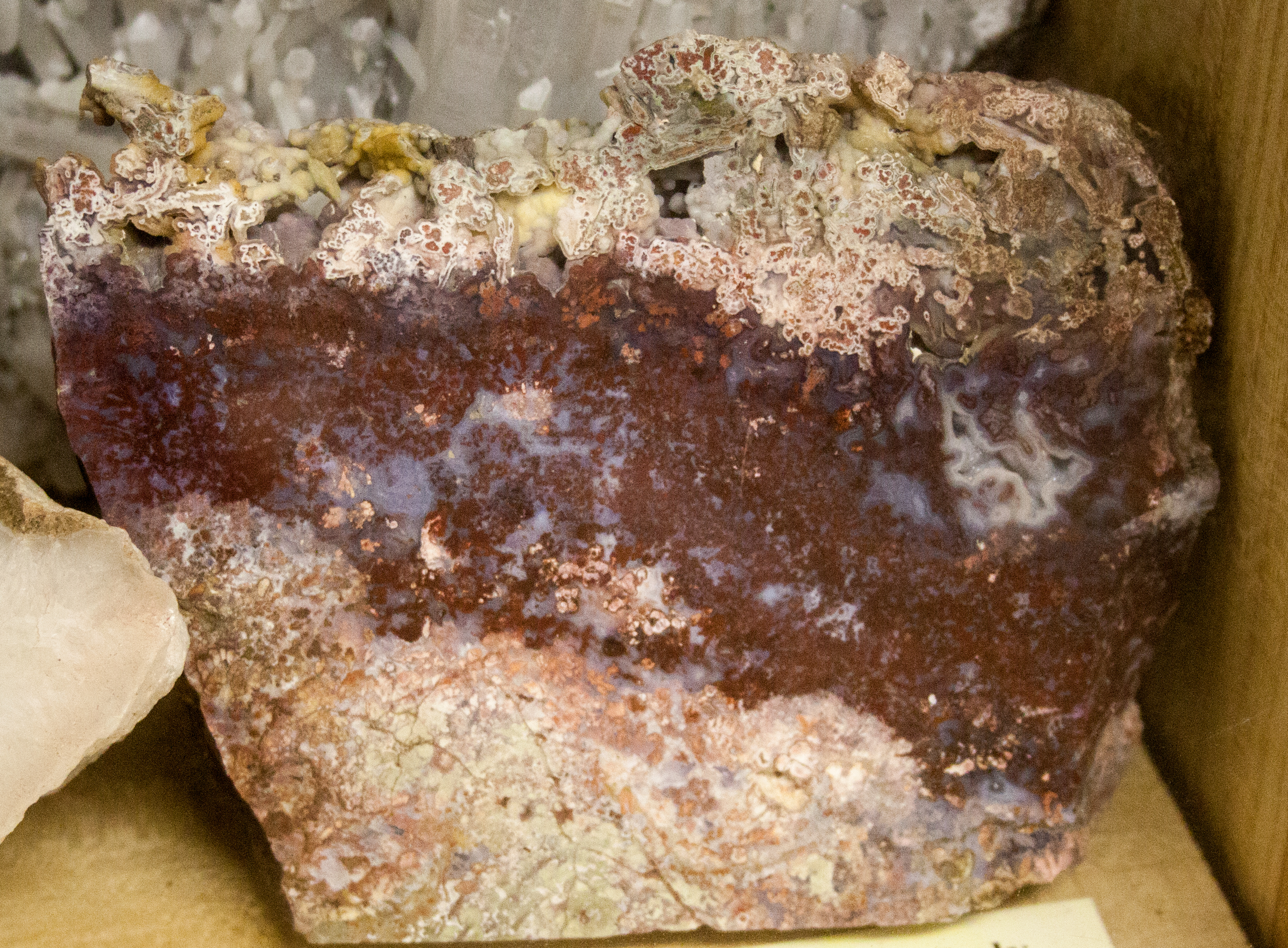
Jasper from Romoszhely

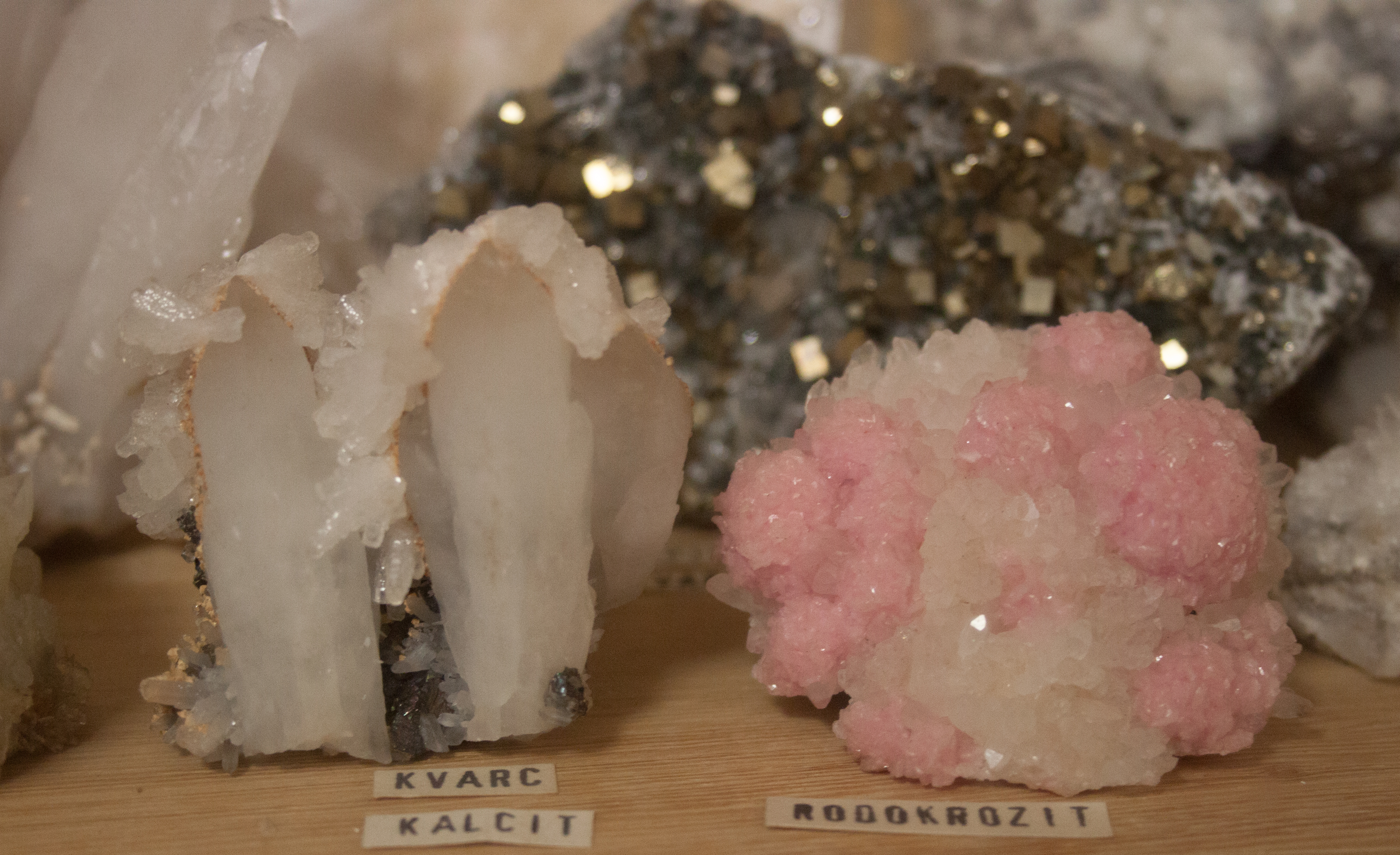
Calcite, Rhodochrosite

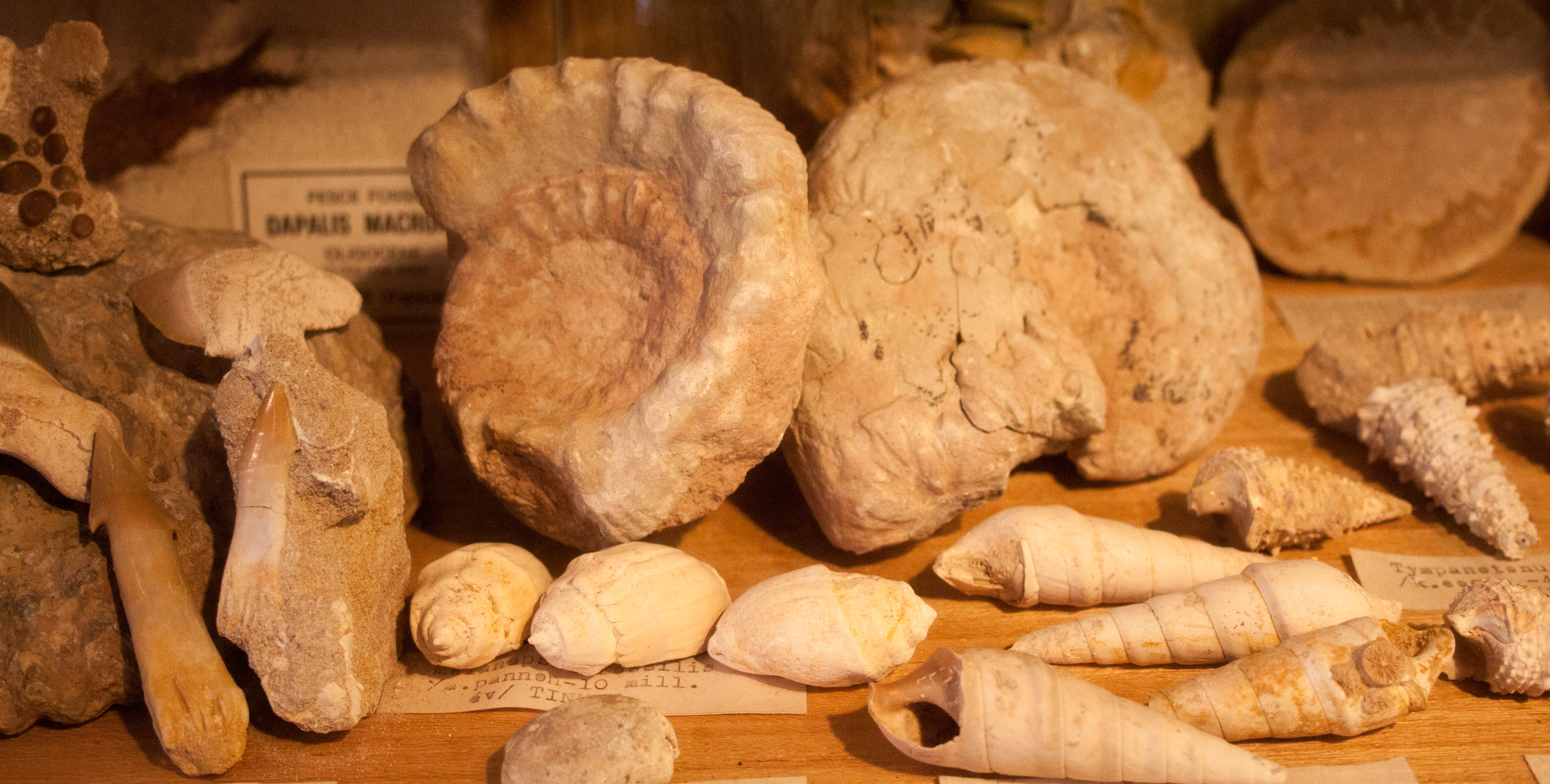
Fossils at the Museum of Minerals

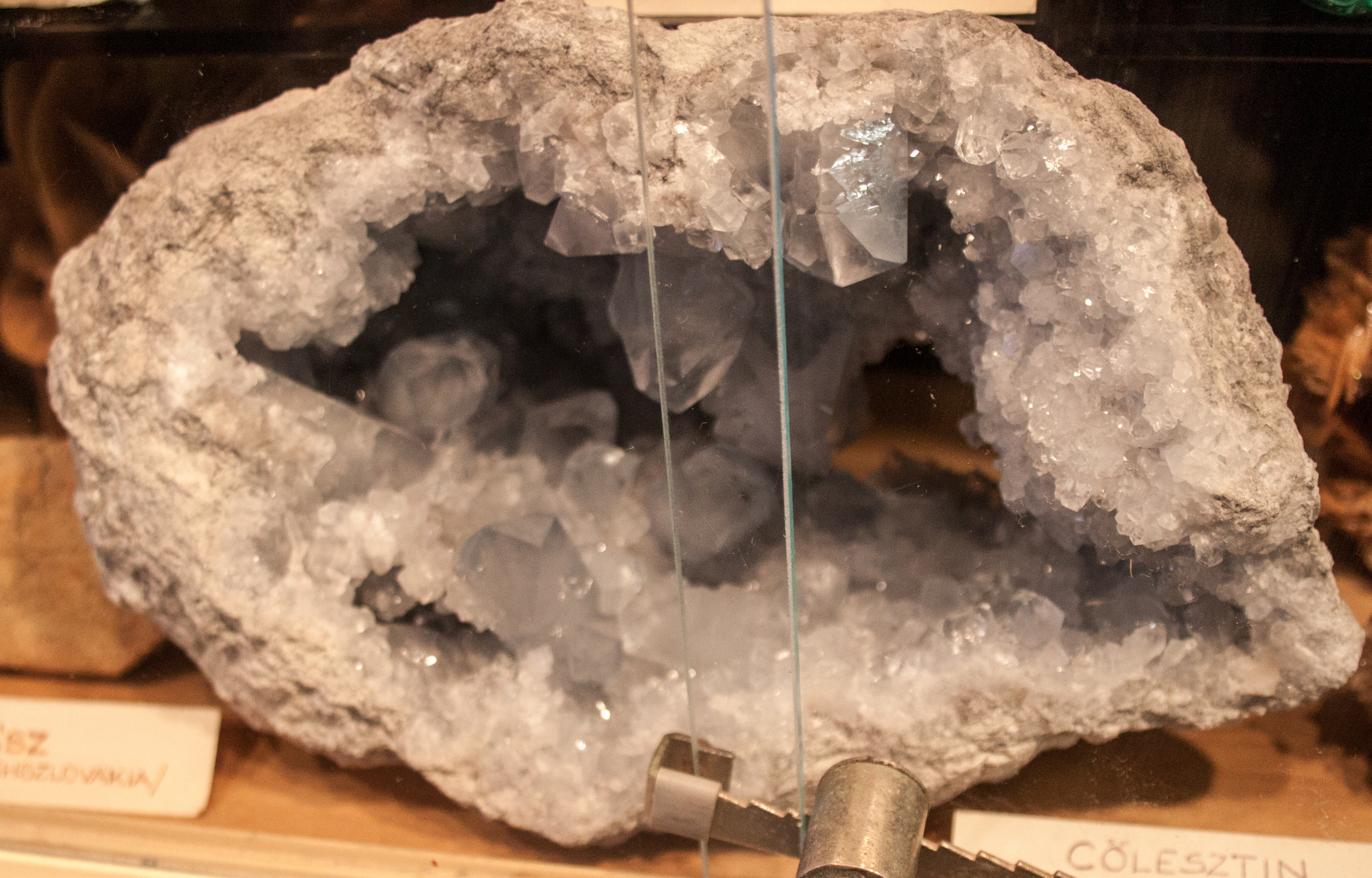
Celestine from Madagascar

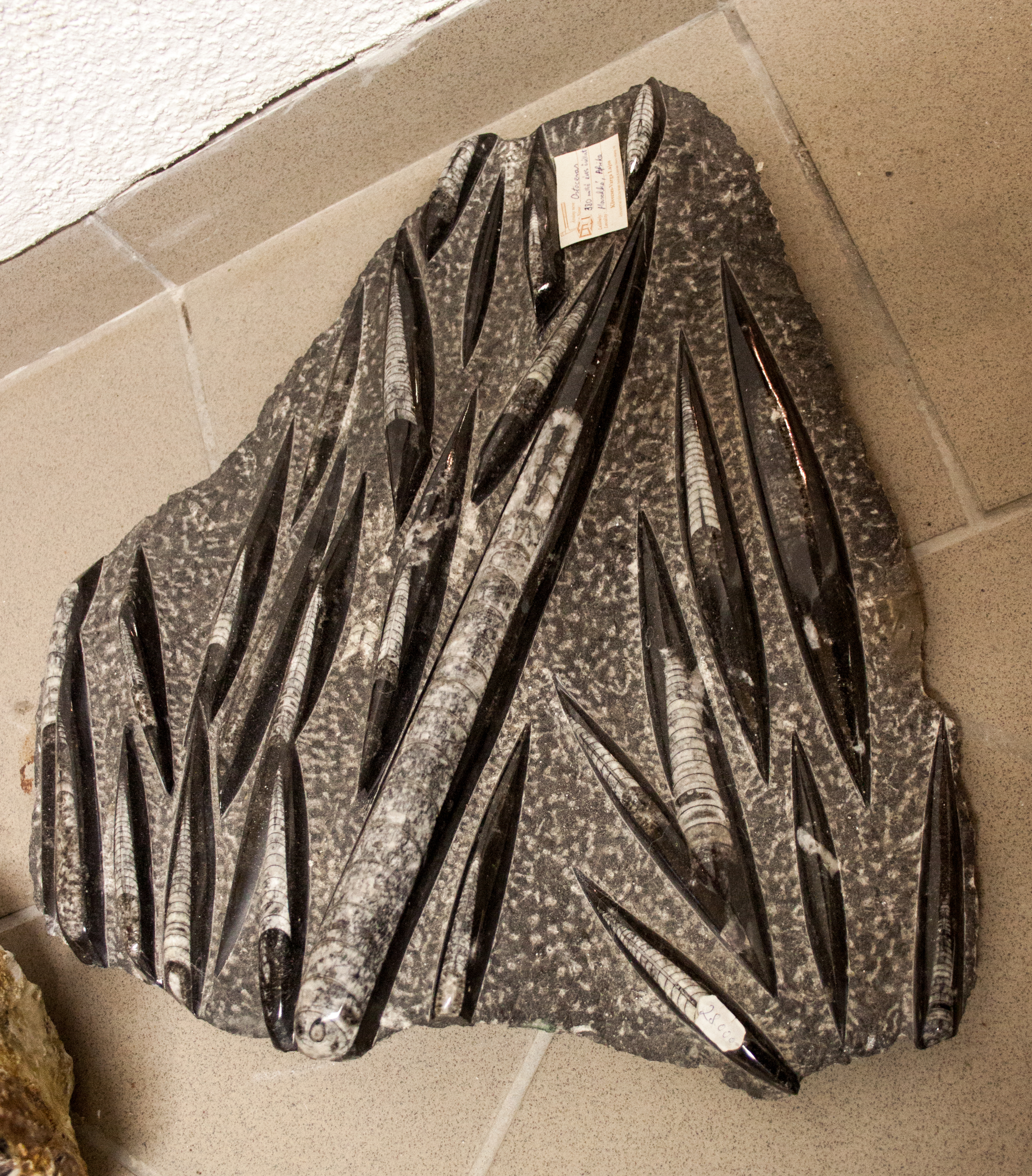
Orthoceras from Morocco

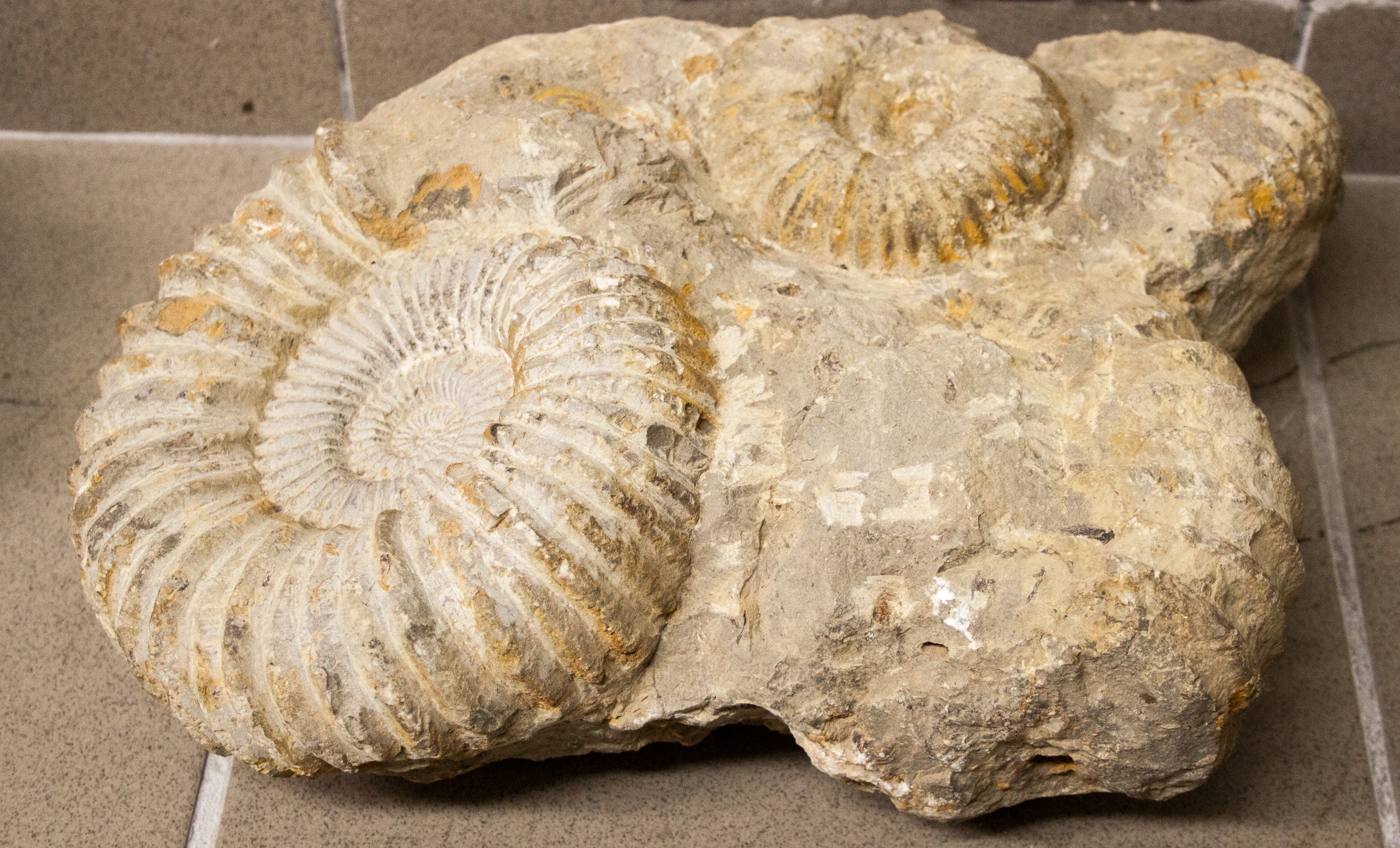
Ammonites

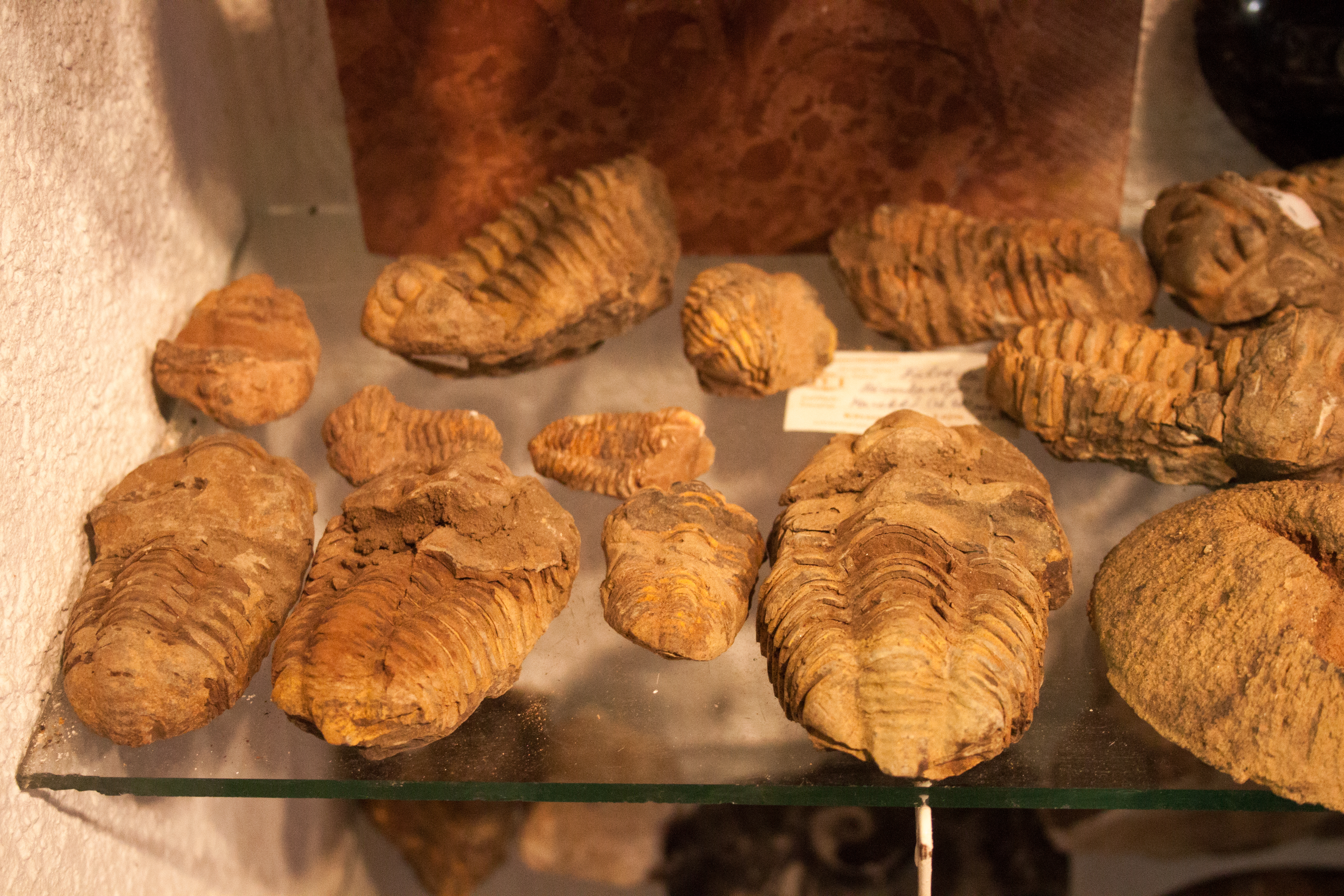
Trilobites

== Sources ==
- Museum of Minerals at siofokportal.com
- Museum of Minerals on the utazzithon.hu portal
