= Samestate =

American Christian alternative rock band

- Origin: Kansas City, Kansas
- Genres: Christian alternative rock
- Years active: 2008-2013
- Labels: Sparrow
- Members: Dalton Diehl; Darren Harms; Ryan Lytle
- Past members: Blake Leoni; Ray Wyatt
- Website: www.samestatemusic.com

Samestate was an American Christian alternative rock band originating from Kansas City, Kansas. Band members included Dalton Diehl on vocals, piano and guitar, Darren Harms on guitar and Ryan Lytle on the bass guitar. Their first studio album, The Alignment, was released on February 27, 2012, by Sparrow Records, produced by Pete Kipley and Paul Moak. They are best known for their first single, "Hurricane". It reached No. 4 on Air 1's Top Songs Chart on November 12, 2011.

In March 2013 the band launched a Kickstarter campaign to raise funds for an independent EP, The Boxer & The Thief. It was successfully funded and the EP was available in July to backers.

On the September 18, 2013, the band announced on their Facebook page that they were parting ways.

== Background ==
Samestate was formed in 2008 in Olathe, Kansas. Diehl was the impetus for the creation of the band because he was the worship leader at MidAmerica Nazarene University during his sophomore year, which was when he added Harms and Leoni to the band. Diehl said that he began composing songs to perform during meetings at camps and retreats and at places such as Sheridan's Frozen Custard and Chick-fil-A. This caused him to seek out and add the last two members to the band, Lytle and Wyatt, soon after they had formed the trio. The band signed with Sparrow Records in 2011, who released a taster EP called Samestate, a precursor to 2012's The Alignment. The band decided to sign with Sparrow Records instead of remaining independent, citing the talent at Sparrow could help foster their career.

== Tours ==
The band's first tour began in August 2011. Called "So Long Summer", it was with a band named Caleb (composed of Caleb and Will Chapman, who are sons of Steven Curtis Chapman). Samestate's second outing was the "Rise Up" tour with Family Force 5 during March and April 2012. The "Radio Listener Appreciation" tour, with Building 429 and Andy Cherry, immediately followed in April and May.

== Discography ==
=== Album ===
Year	Album	Peak chart positions	
Year	Album	Top Christian	Top Heatseekers
2012	The Alignment: Released: February 28, 2012; Label: Sparrow; Format: CD, digital download	—	—
2013	The Boxer & The Thief EP: Released: 2013; Label: Independent; Format: CD, digital download	—	—

=== Singles ===
Year	Title	Chart peaks		Album
Year	Title	US Christian Songs	US Christian CHR	Album
2011	"Hurricane"	37	3	The Alignment
2012	"Shadows"	44	19	The Alignment

=== Videos ===
The song "Hurricane" has a music video on YouTube. In 2012, the band was working on its second music video with the song "Shadows".
