= Ágota Bozai =

Hungarian writer

Ágota Bozai (born 1965, Siófok) is a Hungarian journalist and novelist. She has written eight novels in Hungarian, and for her doctoral degree, translated James Joyce's Finnegans Wake into Hungarian.

== Life ==
Bozai was born in Siófok, Hungary in 1965. She holds an MA degree in philology from the University of Kolozsvár in Cluj-Napoca. She has a PhD in English Literature, and her thesis was on her translation of James Joyce's Finnegan's Wake. She works as a journalist as well as a novelist and teacher.

== Work ==
Bozai is a literary translator of English books (fiction and non-fiction) for various Hungarian publishers. She has written eight novels of her own in Hungarian. Her first novel, Persian Divan, was an autobiographical account of her unhappy marriage to an Iranian student she met at university. Bozai's first novel was described as a "satirical account of what happened in the east European Countries when ‘at-all-costs capitalism’ sprung up from the ashes of the previously Soviet-controlled governments." Her later novels include Tranzit glória (1999; published in German as Err is goettlich in 2001 and in English as To Err is Divine in 2004, translated by David Kramer), Mi az ábra? (What's Up? 2003) and A szerelmetlen város (A Loveless Little Town, 2004).

Bozai's second novel To Err is Divine describes a middle-aged teacher, Anna Levay, who is an atheist but develops miraculous powers. Philip Landon stated in the Washington Post Book World that Bozai "satirizes the grotesque opportunism of the 1990s, when former lackeys of the communist regime discovered the joys of capitalism." It has also been described as "a satirical narrative worthy of Swift". The novel was a bestseller in Hungary and Germany before being published in English in 2004.
