= Unaligned =

Unaligned literally means "not aligned". It may refer to:

- Unaligned characters in Vampire: The Requiem
- In other role-playing games, it refers to someone who does not fit within the game's alignment system, for example, in NetHack, Moloch is unaligned
- Non-Aligned Movement of states
- Unaligned data structures in computer science
