= Ságvár =

Village in Southern Transdanubia, Hungary

Ságvár Tricciana (in Latin)
- Village
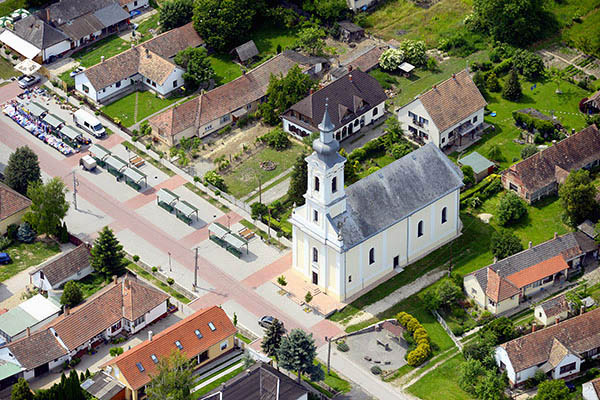
- Centre of Ságvár

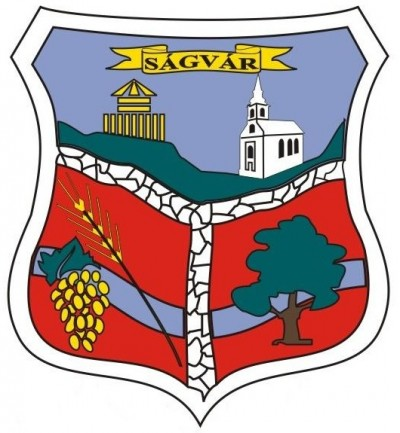
- Coat of arms

- Location of Somogy county in Hungary

- Location of Ságvár
- Coordinates: 46.83707°N 18.10202°E
- Country: Hungary
- Region: Southern Transdanubia
- County: Somogy
- District: Siófok
- RC Diocese: Kaposvár

Area
  - Total: 38.44 km^{2} (14.84 sq mi)

Population (2017)
  - Total: 1,787
  - Density: 46.49/km^{2} (120.4/sq mi)
- Demonym: ságvári
- Time zone: UTC+1 (CET)
  - Summer (DST): UTC+2 (CEST)
- Postal code: 8654
- Area code: (+36) 84
- NUTS 3 code: HU232
- MP: Mihály Witzmann (Fidesz)
- Website: Ságvár Online

Ságvár (Latin: Tricciana) is a village in Somogy county, Hungary.

== Etymology ==
According to the local legends the settlement was named after a pasha called Ság who had a castle there. Researchers agree that Ság was a Kabar or Hungarian person name which could be the name of its first owner. The word ság meant in old Hungarian domb (English: hill) or erdős magaslat (English: wooded heights). Vár (English: castle) refers to the traces of a Roman castle in Ságvár.

== History ==
According to László Szita the settlement was completely Hungarian in the 18th century.
