= Kongsberg Automotive =

Automotive parts manufacturer

KA
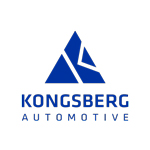
- Type: Allmennaksjeselskap
- Traded as: OSE: KOA
- Industry: Automotive
- Founded: 24 March 1987
- Headquarters: Kongsberg, Norway,
- Area served: Global
- Products: Automotive parts
- Revenue: EUR 788 million (2024)
- Number of employees: Approximately 4,700 (2024)
- Website: kongsbergautomotive.com

Kongsberg Automotive Holding ASA is an automotive parts manufacturer.

== History ==
The company started as a division of Kongsberg Våpenfabrikk in 1957.

== See also ==
- IFA Group, German automotive parts manufacturer
