= The Rescue (Adam Cappa album) =

Studio album by Adam Cappa
- Released: March 13, 2012
- Genre: Contemporary Christian music
- Length: 36:37
- Label: BEC
- Producers: Jeremy Camp, Adam Cappa, Andy Dodd

Adam Cappa chronology
The Rescue EP (2011)	The Rescue (2012)

The Rescue is the first studio album by contemporary Christian-rock musician Adam Cappa, released on March 13, 2012 by BEC.

== Critical reception ==
Professional ratings
Review scores
Source	Rating
CCM Magazine	3/5 stars
Christian Music Zine	4/5 stars
Cross Rhythms	9/10 squares
Indie Vision Music	3/5 stars
Jesus Freak Hideout	3/5 stars
Louder Than The Music	4/5 stars
New Release Tuesday	4/5 stars
Worship Leader	4.5/5 stars

CCM Magazine's Matt Conner said "there's a tenderness and authenticity that accompanies Adam Cappa's label debut that prevents the adult contemporary pop sound from becoming too familiar. The sounds on The Rescue are nothing new but Cappa's heart for his maker and his message are impossible to resist."

Christian Music Zine's Joshua Andre wrote the album "it’s hard for new artists to release a debut album with ticks in all the right boxes; however Adam Cappa in my opinion is a lyricist and a singer for the ages. From the strengths of his debut, I am sure he will go far in the Christian music industry, and I’ll be eagerly anticipating his subsequent albums! Adam, your album is a gem. Well done Jeremy and Andy as well. ‘The Rescue’ is one to savour again and again!" The "favourite tracks" according to Andre are the following: "The Rescue", "All I Really Want", "Washed Over Me", "The Only One", "Only a Glimpse".

Cross Rhythms' Tony Cummings said "these aren't simply songs that will sound great on the radio, they'll touch hearts."

Indie Vision Music's Jonathan Andre said "ss I listen to this collection of 10 emotive songs, I am convinced that Jesus is the answer. This is an album of clichés and other out-of-left-field moments, and will be an album to savour for the months and years to come."

Jesus Freak Hideout's Alex "Tincan" Caldwell wrote about this effort that it is "like the fresh-faced contestants on American Idol, who may sincerely sing pop songs sanded smooth for mass consumption, you can't help but root for Cappa to succeed."

Louder Than The Music's Jono Davies said "what else can I say apart from this album has ten good pop rock songs, sung by a great vocalist. It's a strong album that is well worth checking out. Don't just take my word for it, have a listen to a few of the stand out tracks and see what you think." Davies wrote that the standout tracks are "All I Really Want", "Sail Away", and "Washed Over Me".

New Release Tuesday's Kevin Davis said the album "bears comparison to Cappa’s mentor with its biblically insightful themes and emotionally stirring arrangements. It also brings to mind Passion worship leaders Matt Redman, Kristian Stanfill and Chris Tomlin through subtle European production values and a crystalline singing voice that engages both pop and praise listeners alike."

Worship Leader's Jason Whitehorn wrote that there is "not a single skippable track on the entire album." Whitehorn noted the "standout gems such as 'The Rescue' and 'Only a Glimpse' that could be easily implemented into your modern worship service and songs like “How Worthy” that are perfect for congregational standards."

== Track listing ==
CD track order
No.	Title	Writer(s)	Length
1.	"The Rescue"	Jeremy Camp, Adam Cappa, Andy Dodd	3:54
2.	"All I Really Want"	Camp, Scott Davis	3:32
3.	"Washed Over Me"	Camp, Cappa, Dodd	3:52
4.	"The Only One"	Camp, Cappa, Dodd	3:43
5.	"Sail Away"	Camp, Cappa, Dodd	3:44
6.	"Perfect"	Camp, Cappa, Dodd	3:31
7.	"Only a Glimpse"	Camp, Cappa, Davis, Dodd	4:02
8.	"From the Inside"	Camp, Cappa, Dodd	3:05
9.	"What's At Stake"	Camp, Cappa, Dodd	3:49
10.	"How Worthy"	Camp, Cappa, Dodd, Konrad Snyder	3:25
Total length:			36:37

== Charts ==
=== Album ===
Chart (2012)	Peak positions
US Billboard Christian Albums	22
US Billboard Heatseekers	7

=== Singles ===
Year	Single	Peak chart positions
Year	Single	US Christian
2012	"The Rescue"	36
