= Adam Cappa =

American songwriter (born 1985)

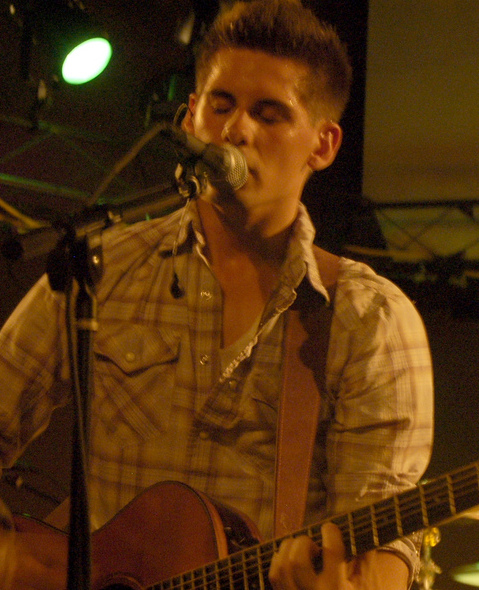
- Cappa in concert in 2009

Background information
- Born: Adam Matthew Cappa; October 29, 1985 (age 41); Richmond, Indiana, U.S.
- Genres: Contemporary Christian, rock
- Occupations: Singer, songwriter
- Instruments: Singing, guitar
- Years active: 2006–present
- Label: BEC
- Website: adamcappa.com

Adam Matthew Cappa (born October 29, 1985) is an American contemporary Christian and rock singer-songwriter born and raised in Richmond, Indiana. Cappa released his first, full-length studio album, The Rescue, in 2012 on BEC Recordings.

== Background ==
Cappa ministered at Young Life meetings to high school and middle school students as well as leading youth group worship at his church. He was afforded the opportunity to pursue singing and songwriting by partnering with Jeremy Camp five years prior to the release of The Rescue. Camp secured Cappa's record deal with his (Camp's) label BEC Recordings. The first album Cappa ever made was Carry Me and the first demo song he played for Camp was "Trusting You". Cappa's second indie album is titled Love Driven. He's now working on a new EP, raising funds on Kickstarter.

== Discography ==
=== Albums ===
Year	Album details	Peak chart positions	
Year	Album details	US Christian	US Heatseakers
2012	The Rescue: Released: March 13, 2012; Label: BEC; Format: CD, digital download	22	7

=== Singles ===
Year	Title	Peak Chart Positions	Album
Year	Title	US Billboard Hot Christian Songs	Album
2012	"The Rescue"	36	The Rescue
2012	"All I Really Want"	—	The Rescue

== Personal life ==
Cappa's parents are Jeffrey Frank Cappa of Wayne County, Indiana and Susan Elizabeth Cappa née Boggs a bank vice-president. He has one older brother named Brandon Martin Cappa and a younger sister named Courtney Elizabeth Cappa.
