= Transfer alignment =

Transfer alignment is the process of initializing and calibrating a missile or torpedo inertial navigation system using data from the host carrier's navigation system. The inertial navigation systems on missiles and torpedoes are limited by weight, volume and cost. Initialization of such systems must be rapid and accurate. Different matching methods, such as velocity matching and position matching, are designed to improve the speed and accuracy of the alignment.

Different factors will affect the accuracy of the transfer alignment, such as reference information delay, mounting error, sensor measurement error, lever-arm effect and flexure of the carrier body.
