= Shaft alignment =

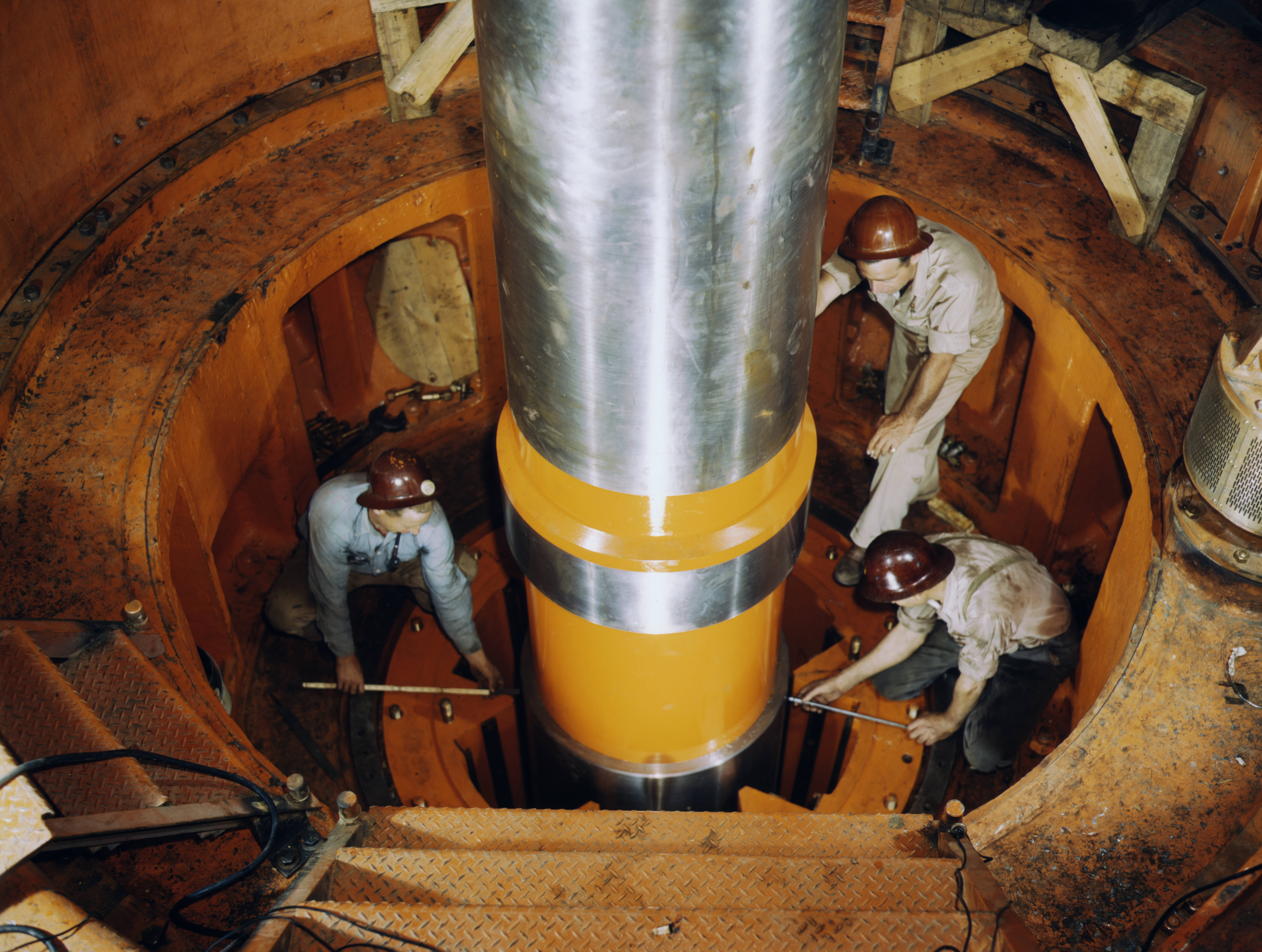
Workers are checking the alignment of a turbine shaft at the top of the guide bearing at the Watts Bar Dam, Tennessee, USA.

Shaft alignment is the process of aligning two or more shafts with each other to within a tolerated margin. The resulting fault if alignment is not achieved within the demanded specifications is shaft misalignment, which may be offset or angular. Faults can lead to premature wear and damage to systems.

== Background ==
When a driver, like an electric motor or a turbine, is coupled to a pump, generator, or any other piece of equipment, the shafts of the two pieces must be aligned. Any misalignment increases the stress on the shafts and will almost certainly result in excessive wear and premature breakdown of the equipment. This can be very costly. When the equipment is down, production requiring the equipment may be delayed. Bearings or mechanical seals may be damaged and need to be replaced.

Shaft alignment is the process of aligning two or more shafts with each other to within a tolerated margin. The process is used for machinery before the machinery is put in service.

== Technology ==
Before shaft alignment can be done, the foundations for the driver and the driven piece must be designed and installed correctly.

Flexible couplings are designed to allow a driver (e.g., electric motor, engine, turbine, hydraulic motor) to be connected to the driven equipment. Flexible couplings use an elastomeric insert to allow a slight degree of misalignment. Flexible couplings can also use shim packs. These couplings are called disc couplings.

Tools used to achieve alignment may be mechanical, optical (e.g., laser shaft alignment), or gyroscope–based. The gyroscopic systems can be operated very time efficiently and can also be used if the shafts have a large distance (e.g., on marine vessels).

== Misalignment ==
The resulting fault if alignment is not achieved within the demanded specifications is shaft misalignment, which may be offset, angular, or both. Misalignment can cause increased vibration and loads on the machine parts for which they have not been designed (i.e. improper operation).

=== Types of misalignment ===
There are two types of misalignment: offset or parallel misalignment and angular, gap, or face misalignment. With offset misalignment, the center lines of both shafts are parallel, but they are offset. With angular misalignment, the shafts are at an angle to each other. Errors of alignment can be caused by parallel misalignment, angular misalignment, or a combination of the two.

Offset misalignment can be further divided into horizontal and vertical misalignment. Horizontal misalignment is misalignment of the shafts in the horizontal plane, and vertical misalignment is misalignment of the shafts in the vertical plane:

- Offset horizontal misalignment is where the motor shaft is moved horizontally away from the pump shaft, but both shafts are still in the same horizontal plane and parallel.
- Offset vertical misalignment is where the motor shaft is moved vertically away from the pump shaft, but both shafts are still in the same vertical plane and parallel.

Similarly, angular misalignment can be divided into horizontal and vertical misalignment:

- Angular horizontal misalignment is where the motor shaft is under an angle with the pump shaft but both shafts are still in the same horizontal plane.
- Angular vertical misalignment is where the motor shaft is under an angle with the pump shaft but both shafts are still in the same vertical plane.
