= Nicolò Porta =

Italian painter

Nicola or Niccolò Porta (5 December 1710 - 22 February 1784) was an Italian painter of the late-Baroque period.

== Life ==
He was born and active in Molfetta. He was born to Saverio Porta, the first mentor of Corrado Giaquinto. Nicolo spent some years training with a cousin Giuseppe, but then moved to Rome to work for nearly a decade in the studio of Giaquinto. He was likely employed in the decoration of the Roman churches of Santa Croce in Gerusalemme in 1744, and San Nicola dei Lorenesi in 1746. He was very active painting sacred subjects for churches in the region, including for Altamura, Andria, Bari, Bisceglie, Bitonto, Modugno e Nardò.

== Sant'Antonio Abate ==
One of the works recently attributed to the painter Nicola Porta is the painting stored in the museum Archivio Biblioteca Museo Civico in Altamura and named Sant'Antonio Abate (the painting depicts Saint Anthony the Great). In 1985-1986, it had already been attributed to Nicola Porta by Maria Giovanna Di Capua, but at that time no evidence was found that supported this hypothesis. In 2019, after a careful analysis of the ""registro di amministrazione" relating to Altamura Cathedral, it turned out that "Sign. Nicolo Porta" on 14 June 1755 had been paid 10 ducats (perhaps as a down payment) for the painting Sant'Antonio Abate. This painting is almost certainly the one that is now stored in the Archivio Biblioteca Museo Civico in Altamura.

The above discovery was carried out after a careful analysis of the "registro di amministrazione of the "capitolo dell'Assunta" (Altamura Cathedral). At that time, the "registri di amministrazione" were some kind of accounting document where expenses, income and any other money transfer were recorded in chronological order. The "capitolo dell'Asssunta" was nothing more than a kind of board of directors made up of the clergy of Altamura and it had to take care of the economic and cultural assets of the cathedral. Because of the heterogeneity and the huge amount of information stored in the "registri di amministrazione", the information about the above payment had not been found until 2019.

As for its original location, it's been suggested that the painting was perhaps located inside Altamura Cathedral. More precisely, a likely location would be the chapel of Saint Anthony the Great (cappella di Sant'Antonio Abate) inside the cathedral, a chapel that no longer exists (perhaps destroyed during the restoration works of the cathedral in the 19th century) and perhaps located near the choir. A work that was certainly present in the chapel (as shown by some annotations in the same registro di amministrazione) was a statue of Saint Anthony the Great which is probably the one currently stored at the Museo Diocesano Matronei Altamura.

== Works ==
- Holy Trinity for the Church of SS. Trinità in Molfetta
- Birth of the Virgin for the parish church of San Corrado in Molfetta
- Birth of Christ for Chapel of the Congregation of Shepherds in Altamura
- Ste Teresa for the church of the Teresiani in Altamura
- St Ferdinando and the Good Shepherd for the Royal Church of San Nicolò in Bari
- St Francis of Assisi for the church of the minori conventuali of Andria
- Assumption of Christ for the church of the Augustinians in Andria
- Frescoes in the ceiling of the Cathedral of Molfetta depicting episodes from the Bible
- Immaculate Conception for church of the Cappuccinelle of Modugno
- Frescoes depicting Allegory of Virtue for the Gallery in the Palace of Sig. Gentile
- St John the Baptist and St John Evangelist for a church in Dalmazia
- St Anthony the Great (Italian: Sant'Antonio Abate) - 1755, oil on canvas - Originally located inside Altamura Cathedral, now stored inside the museum Archivio Biblioteca Museo Civico, Altamura.
- Miraculous Levitation of St Joseph of Cupertino for a church in Nardò
- Archangel St Micheal for a church in Pomarico

== Bibliography ==
- M. Romano, Saggio sulla storia di Molfetta dall’epoca dell’antica Respa sino al 1840, Volume II, Naples, 1842, page 12
- P. Amato, G. Bellefemine, Pittori Molfettesi del XVII – XVIII secolo, Molfetta, Mezzina, 1969, page 71
- A. Salvemini, Saggio storico della città di Molfetta, Vol. II, Napoli, 1878, pages 113 and 141
- Francesco Giaconella (2019). "Su Nicola Porta e la perduta cappella di Sant'Antonio Abate nella cattedrale di Altamura". Altamura - Rivista storica e bollettino dell'Archivio Biblioteca Museo Civico (6). Francesco D'Amato Editore: 19–26.
- Maria Giovanna Di Capua (1985–1986). "Sant'Antonio Abate". Altamura - Rivista storica e bollettino dell'Archivio Biblioteca Museo Civico (27–28). Francesco D'Amato Editore: 149–151.
