= Corrado Giaquinto =

Italian painter (1703–1766)

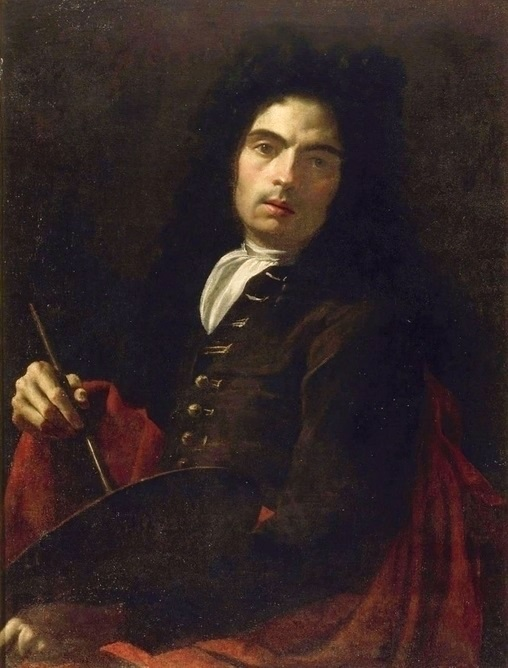
Self-portrait by Giaquinto, Musée Fesch

Corrado Giaquinto (8 February 1703 – 18 April 1766) was an Italian Rococo painter who worked in Naples, Rome, Turin and Madrid.

== Early training and move to Rome ==
Giaquinto was born in Molfetta, in the Kingdom of Naples. As a boy he apprenticed with a modest local painter Saverio Porta, (c. 1667–1725), escaping the religious career his parents had intended for him. By October 1724, he left Molfetta, and along with his contemporaries Francesco de Mura (1696–1784) and Giuseppe Bonito (1707–1789), he trained from 1719 to 1723 in the prolific Neapolitan studio of Francesco Solimena, either with Solimena or his pupil, Nicola Maria Rossi.

Giaquinto followed a peripatetic career, with long sojourns in Naples, Rome (between 1723 and 1753), Turin (1733 and 1735–39), and Madrid (1753–1761).

In 1723, he moved to Rome to work in the studio of Sebastiano Conca. He painted in San Lorenzo in Damaso, San Giovanni Calibita, and the ceiling at Santa Croce in Gerusalemme. In March 1727, with Giuseppe Rossi as an assistant, Giaquinto opened an independent studio near the Ponte Sisto, in the parish of Saint Giovanni of the Malva in Rome. In 1734, he married Caterina Silvestri Agate.

The first documented work by his hand is Christ crucified with the Madonna, Saint John Evangelist, and Magdalene commissioned in 1730 by King John V of Portugal for the Basilica of the Palace of Mafra.

In 1731, he received a prestigious commission, to execute frescoes in the church of San Nicola dei Lorenesi: Saint Nicholas water gush from cliff, three theological and cardinal Virtues, and in the cupola, Paradise. The latest restoration confirms Giaquinto's stylistic independence from Solimena and reveals his stylistic dependence on Luca Giordano.

== Mature work ==
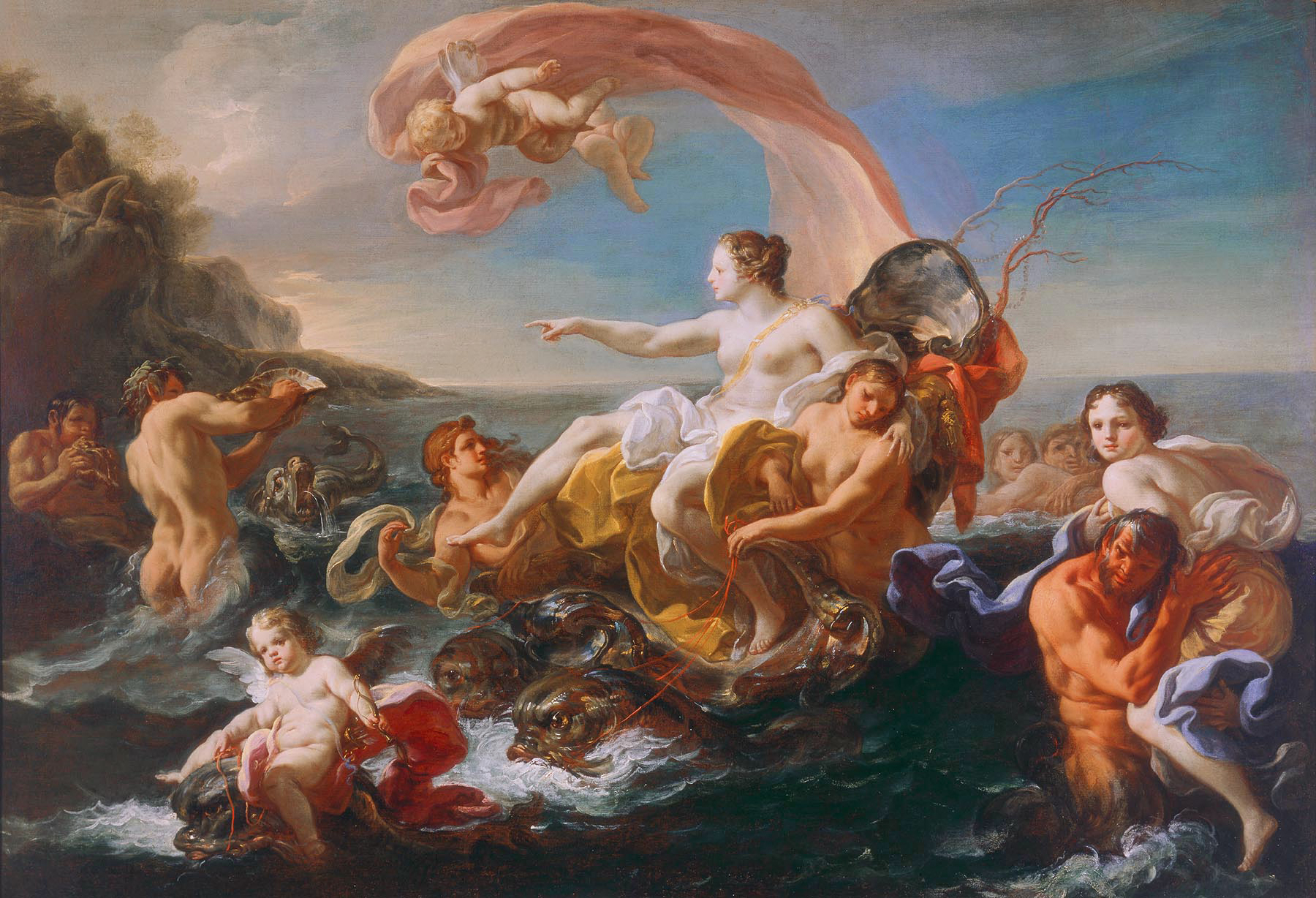
Triumph of Galatea, Milwaukee Art Museum, ca. 1752

In 1733, the architect and artistic director for the House of Savoy, Filippo Juvarra, invited Giaquinto to come to Turin, where he painted an altarpiece of Saint John Nepomuk. He then decorated the ceiling of a Villa della Regina with a Triumph of the House of Savoy, (Note: The Triumph of the House of Savoy was destroyed during World War II.) Death of Adonis and Apollo & Daphne, and Story of Aenid. Giaquinto returned briefly to Rome in 1735, where his wife died soon after childbirth. He then returned for the next three years, to complete frescoes for the chapel of St Joseph in the church of Santa Teresa in Turin; they depict events in the life and death of Saint Joseph, including his Assumption and Rest in Egypt.

In 1738 Giaquinto returned to Rome, and during the next year, he executed in fresco an Assumption of the Virgin for the church of Rocca di Papa, a commission for a relative of Pope Alexander VIII Ottoboni.

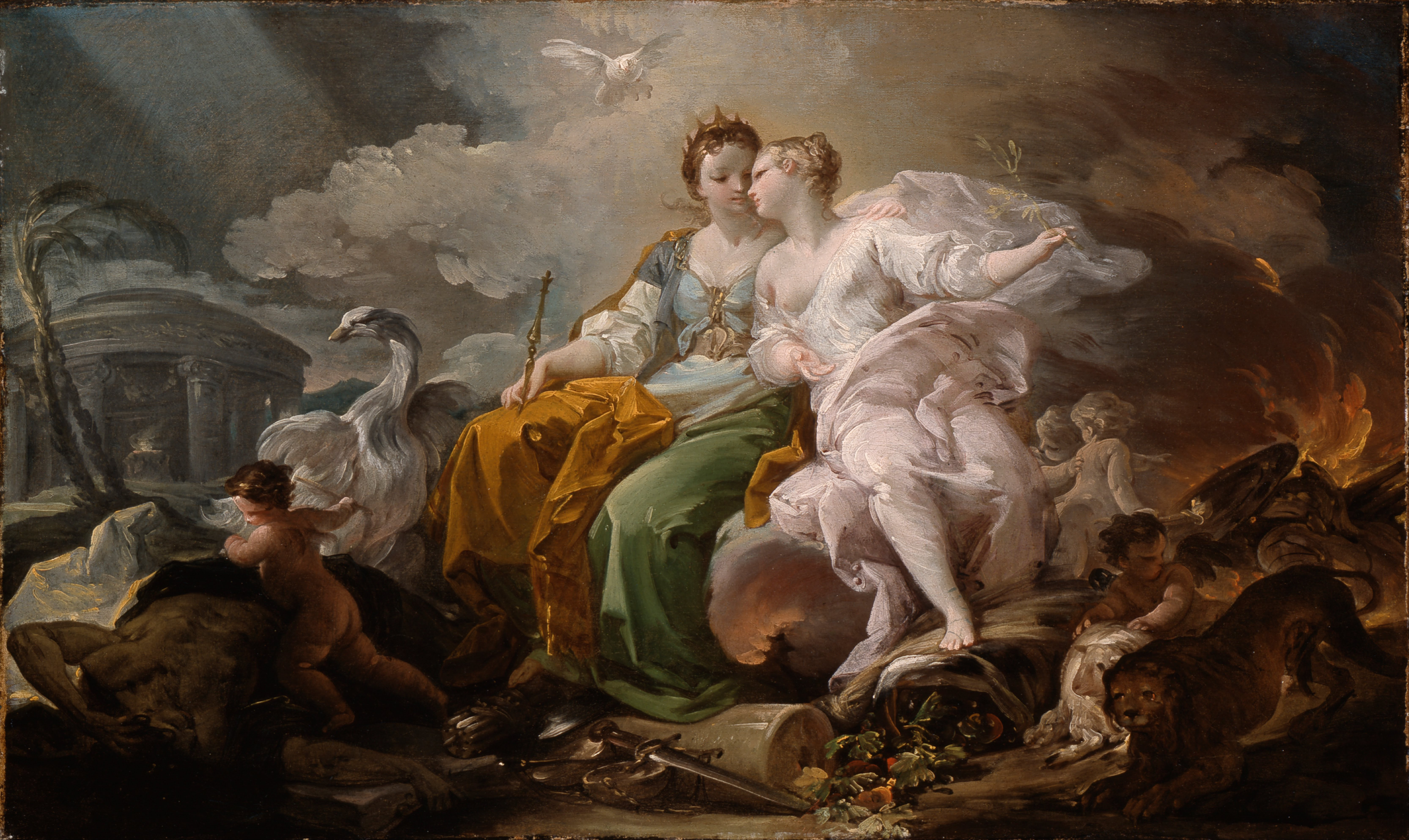
Allegory of Peace and Justice, preparatory sketch, Indianapolis Museum of Art, ca. 1753–54

In 1740, Giaquinto became a member of the Academy of Saint Luke and donated his sketch of Immaculate Conception with Elias the prophet for the Turinese church of the Carmine, a canvas commissioned by Marquis Giuseppe Turinetti di Priero, which finally reached Turin in 1741. A report of 1742 states that Pope Benedict XIV "was taken to the church of San Giovanni Calabita ... where he observed with much pleasure the restoration of that Church embellished with altarpieces from the Painter Signor Corrado Napolitano".

In Madrid, he was patronized by Ferdinand VI of Spain, and was ultimately appointed director of the Academy of San Fernando. His influence there was felt by painters such as Antonio González Velázquez, José del Castillo, Mariano Salvador Maella, and Francisco Goya. His paintings on the ceiling of the main staircase in the Royal Palace of Madrid portray The Triumph of Religion and the Church.

His paintings include A Kneeling Male Nude. He returned to Naples in 1762 to decorate the sacristy in San Luigi di Palazzo, the royal monastery. He died in Naples in 1766.

Among his pupils in Molfetta was Niccoló Porta.

== Style ==
Giaquinto has been called the "greatest exponent" of the Roman Rococo. Always noted especially as a colorist, he is described by the art historian Irene Cioffi as having combined the "seriousness and stability of the Italian Grand Style ... with the loveliness and refinement of the 18th century".

== Gallery ==
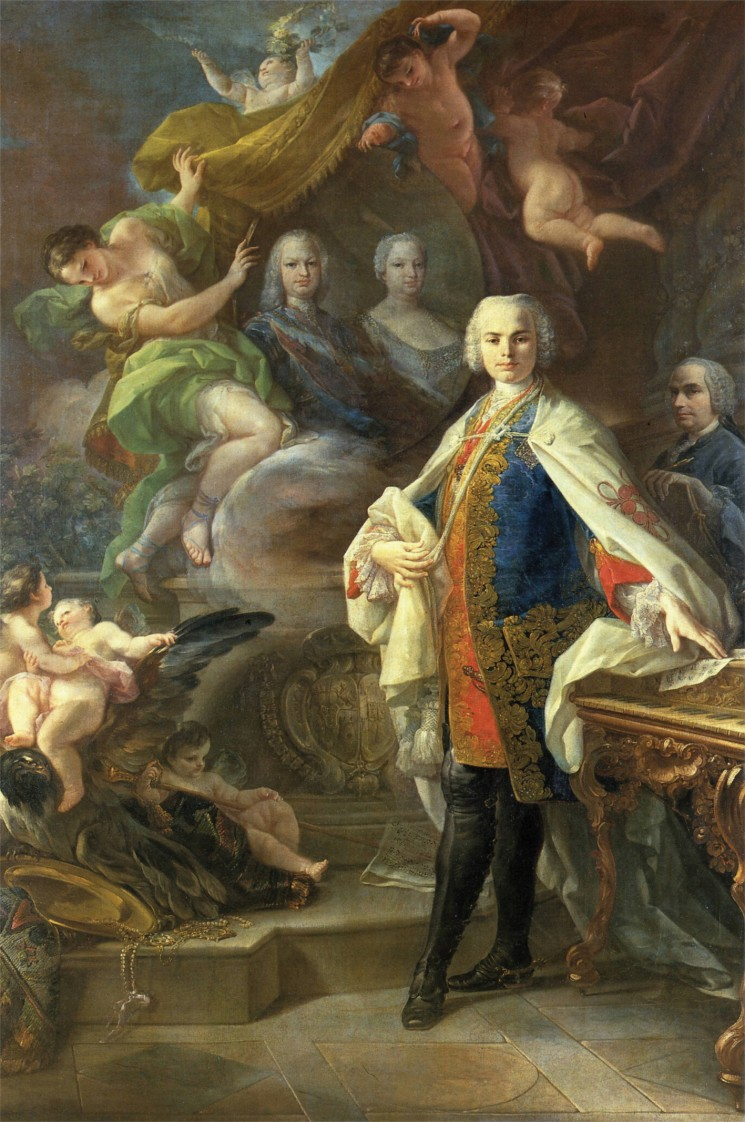
Portrait of Farinelli, ca. 1753, National Art Gallery of Bologna

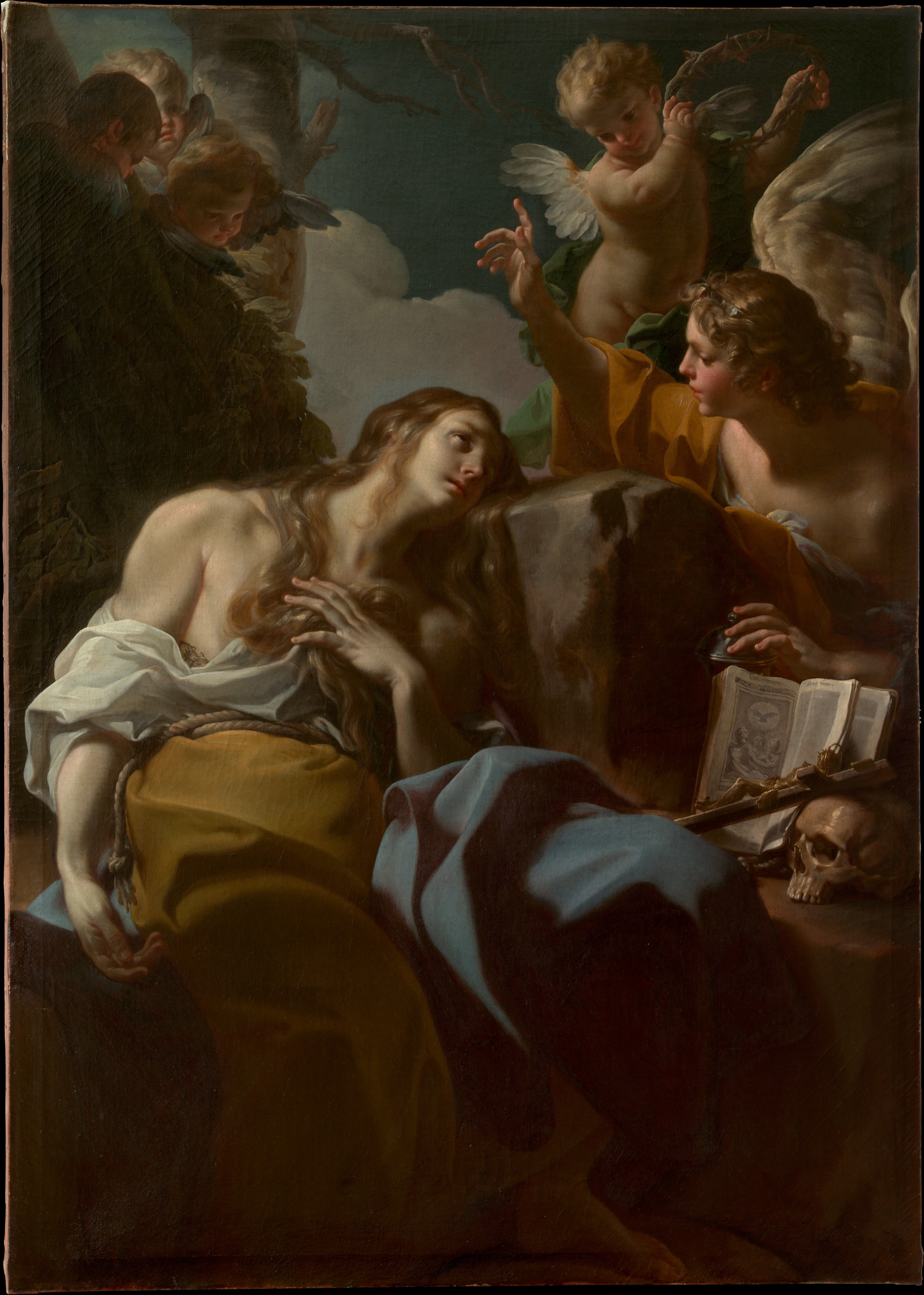
The Penitent Magdalen, ca.1750, Metropolitan Museum of Art, New York

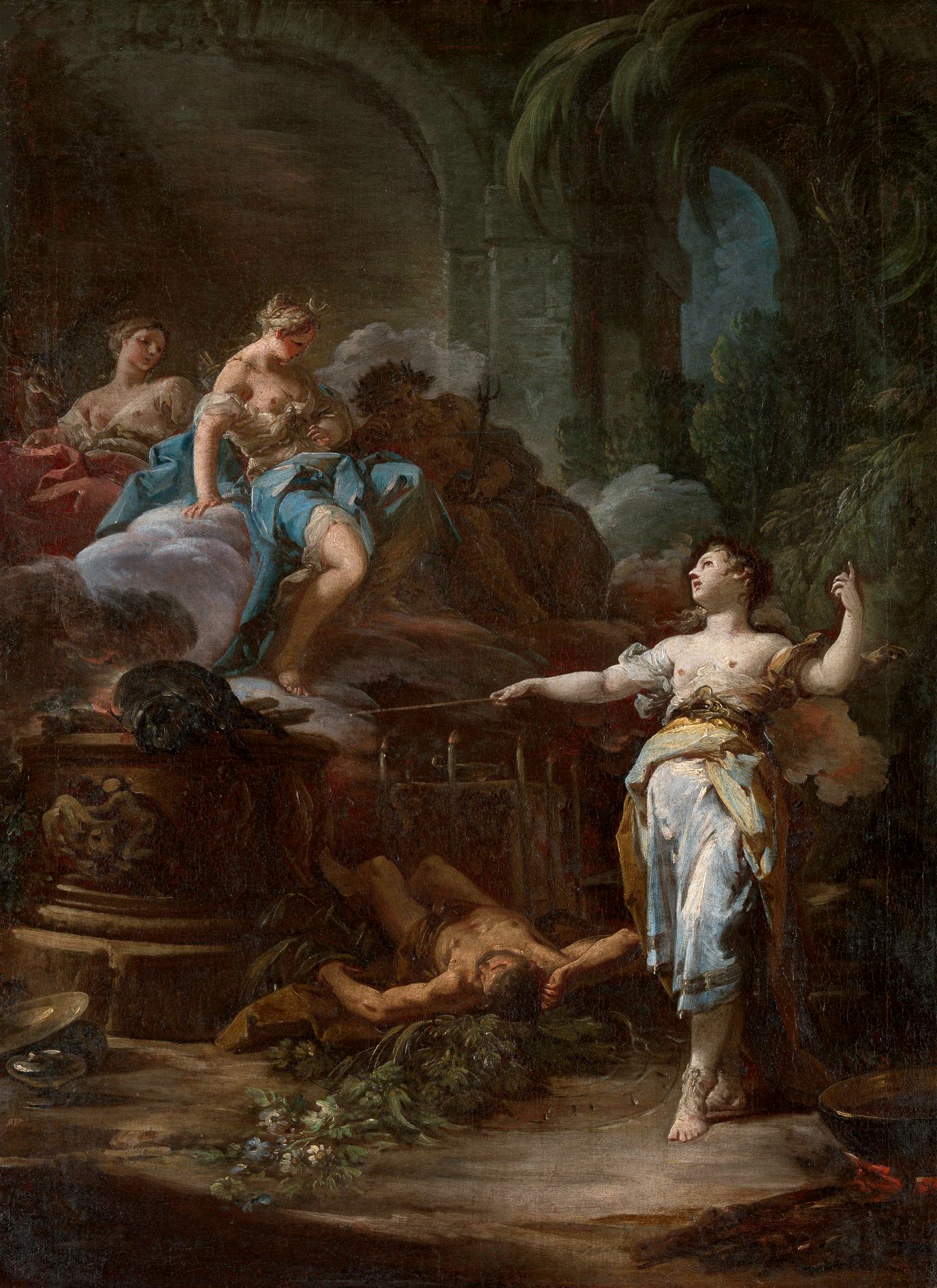
Medea Rejuvenating Aeson, 1760, Metropolitan Museum of Art, New York

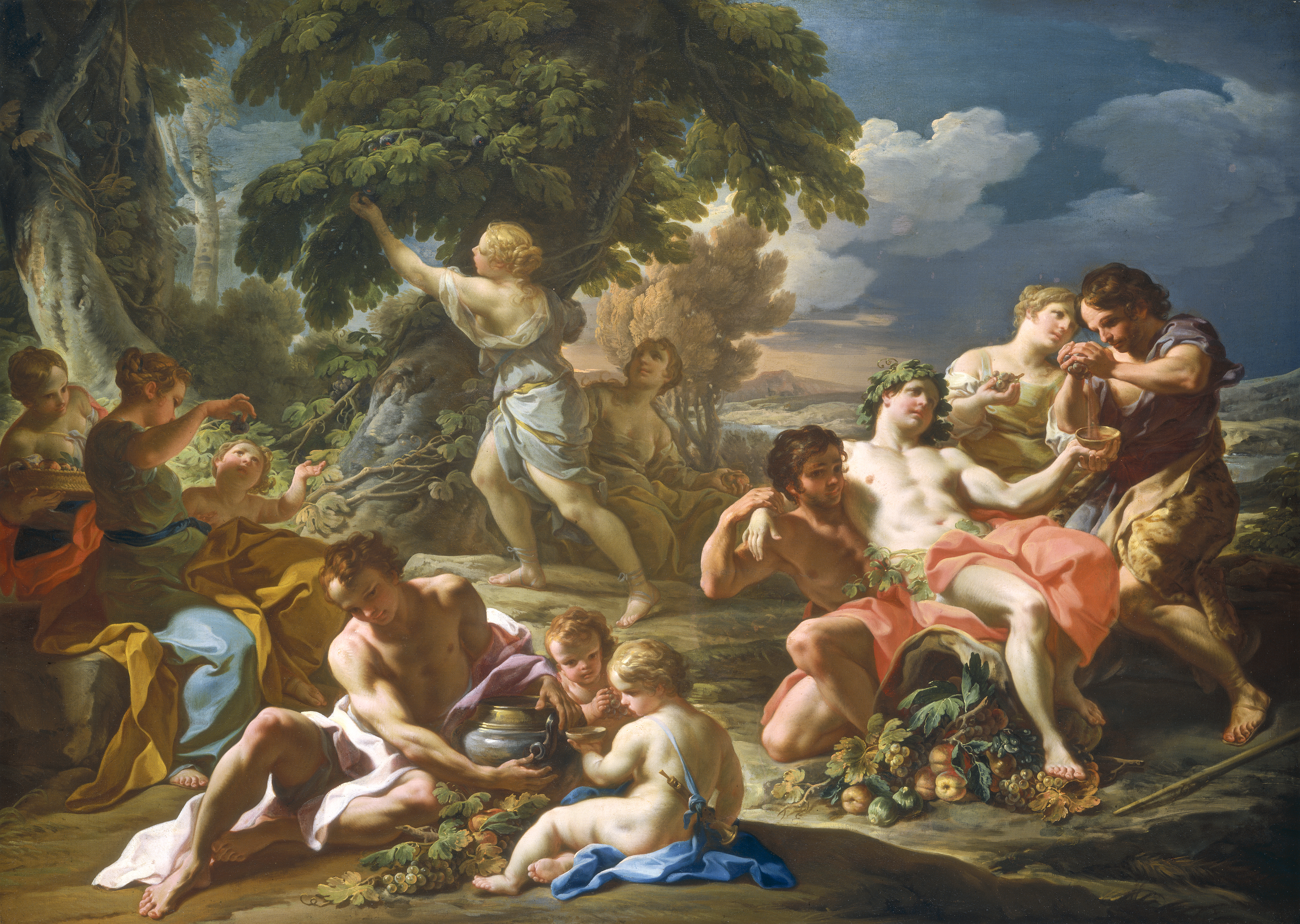
Autumn, 1740–1750, National Gallery of Art, Washington, D.C.

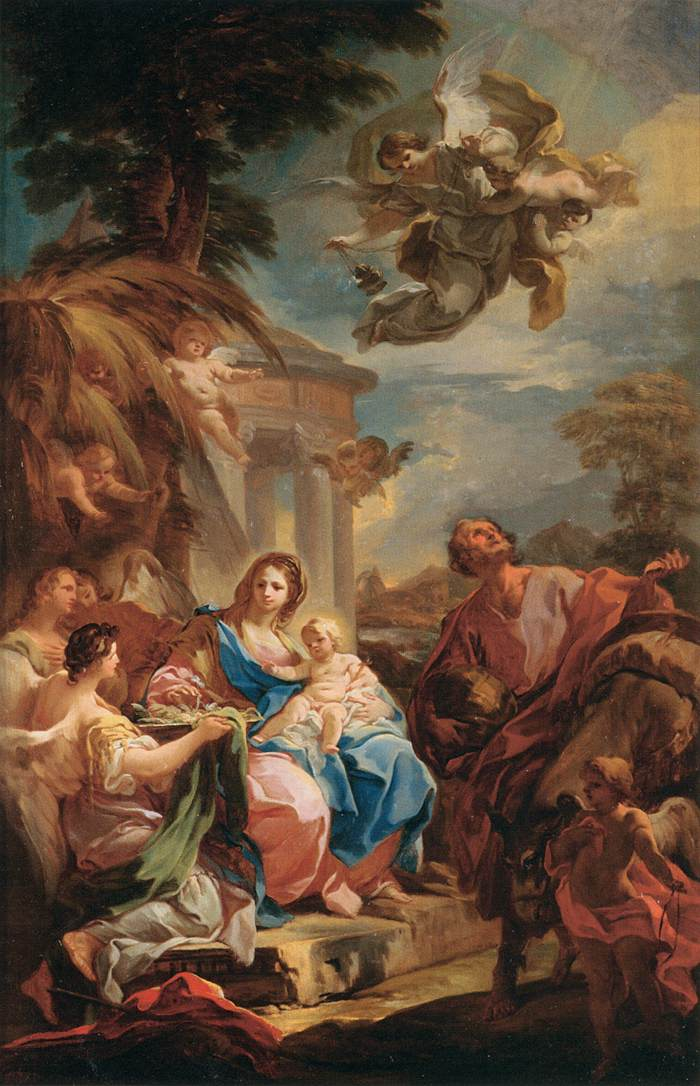
Rest on the Flight into Egypt, 1740–1742, Louvre Museum, Paris

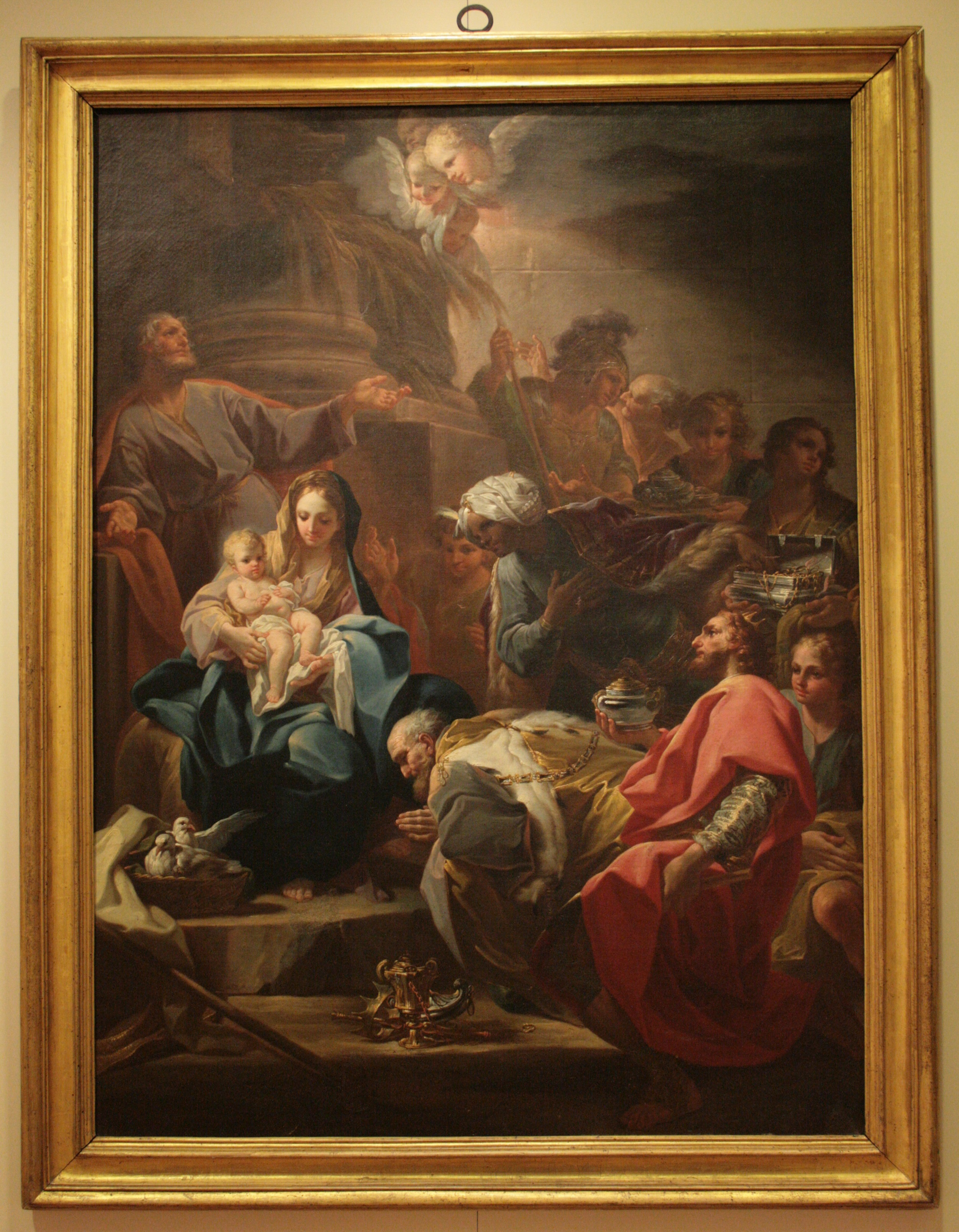
Adoration of the Magi, 1750, Museo civico Bevagna

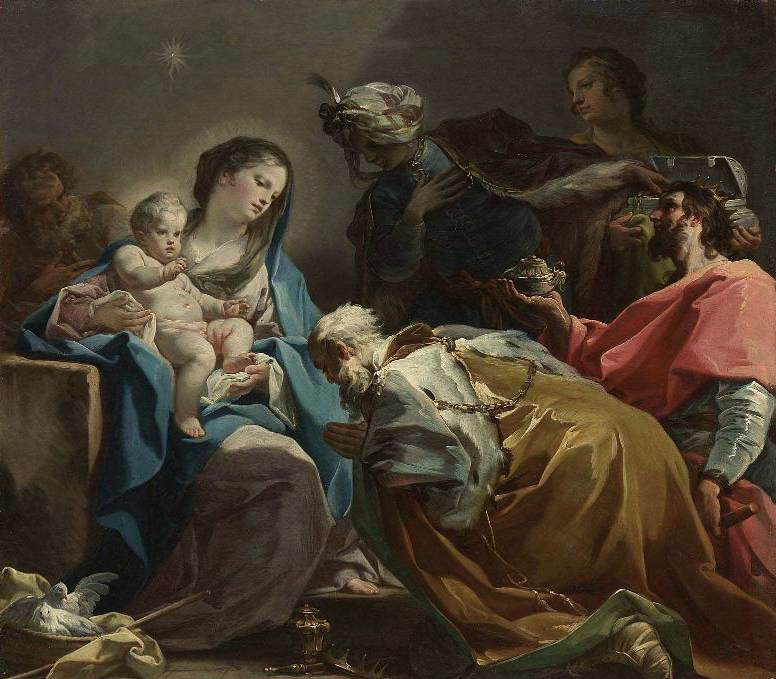
Adoration of the Magi, 1725, Museum of Fine Arts, Boston

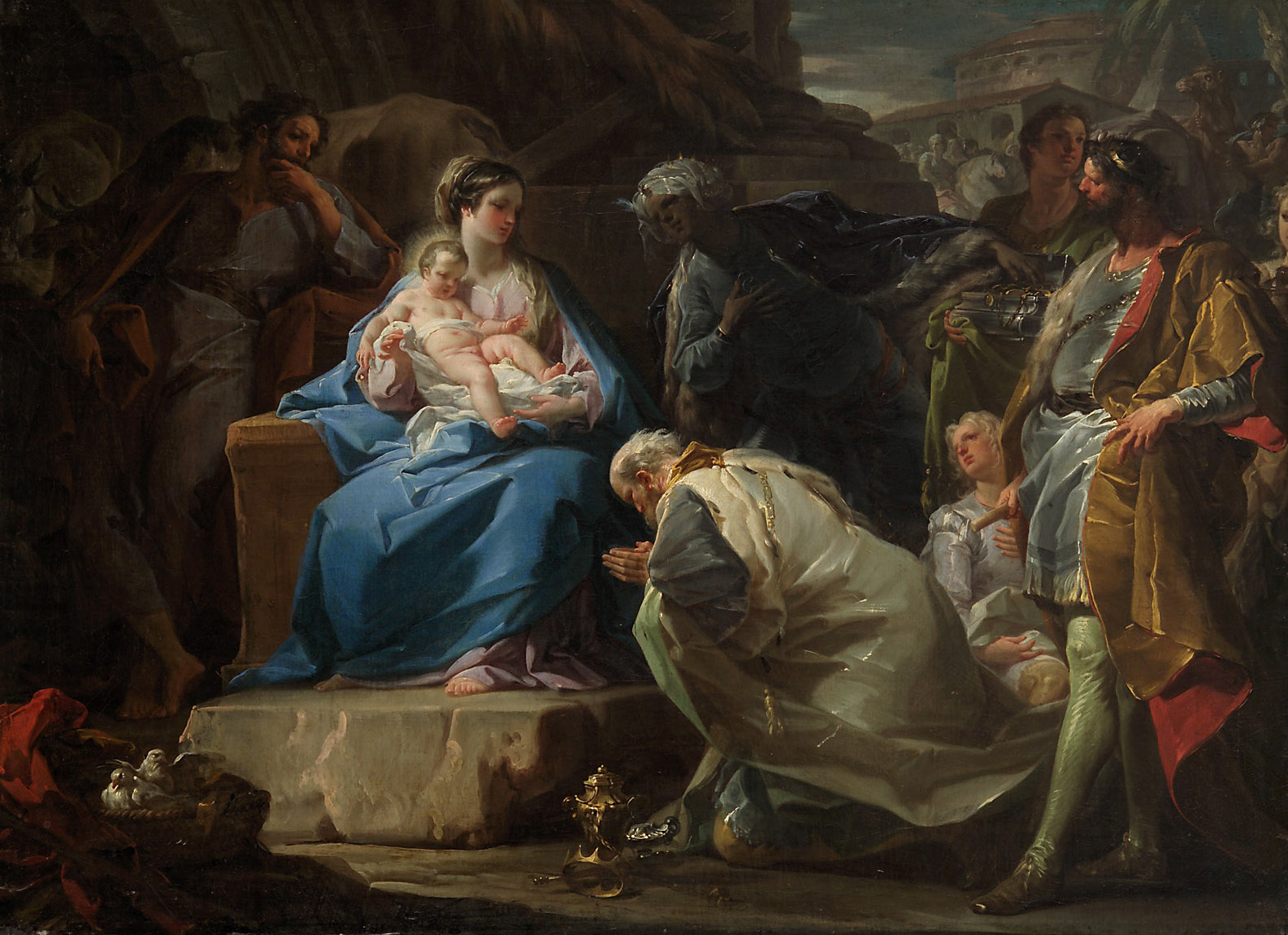
Adoration of the Magi, 1740–45, Kunsthistorisches Museum, Vienna

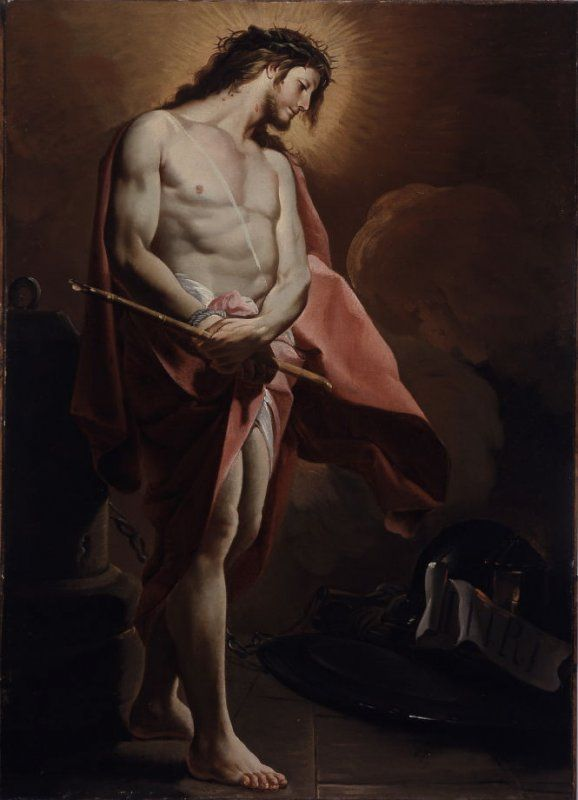
Christ at the column, Fine Arts Museums of San Francisco

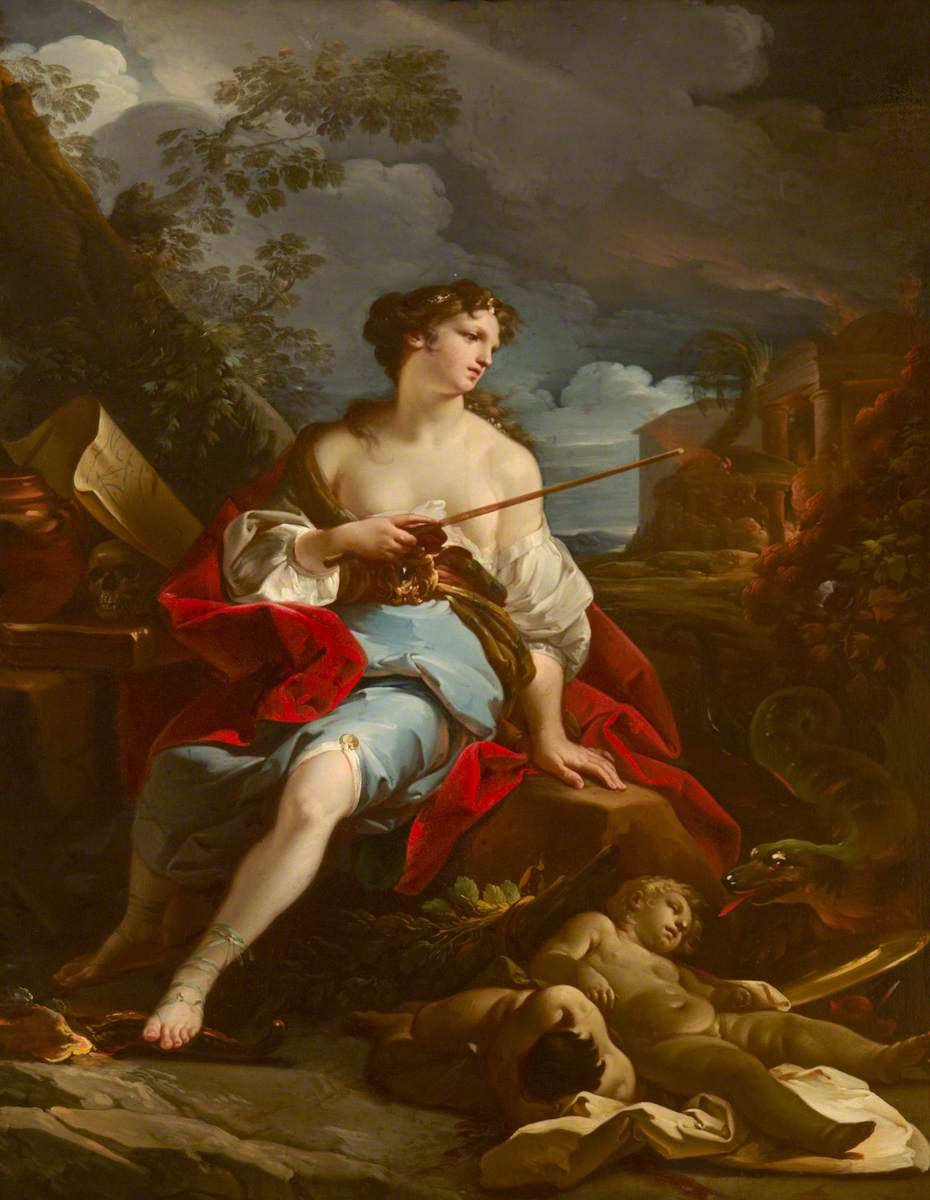
Medea, ca. 1750–1752, National Trust, Hinton Ampner

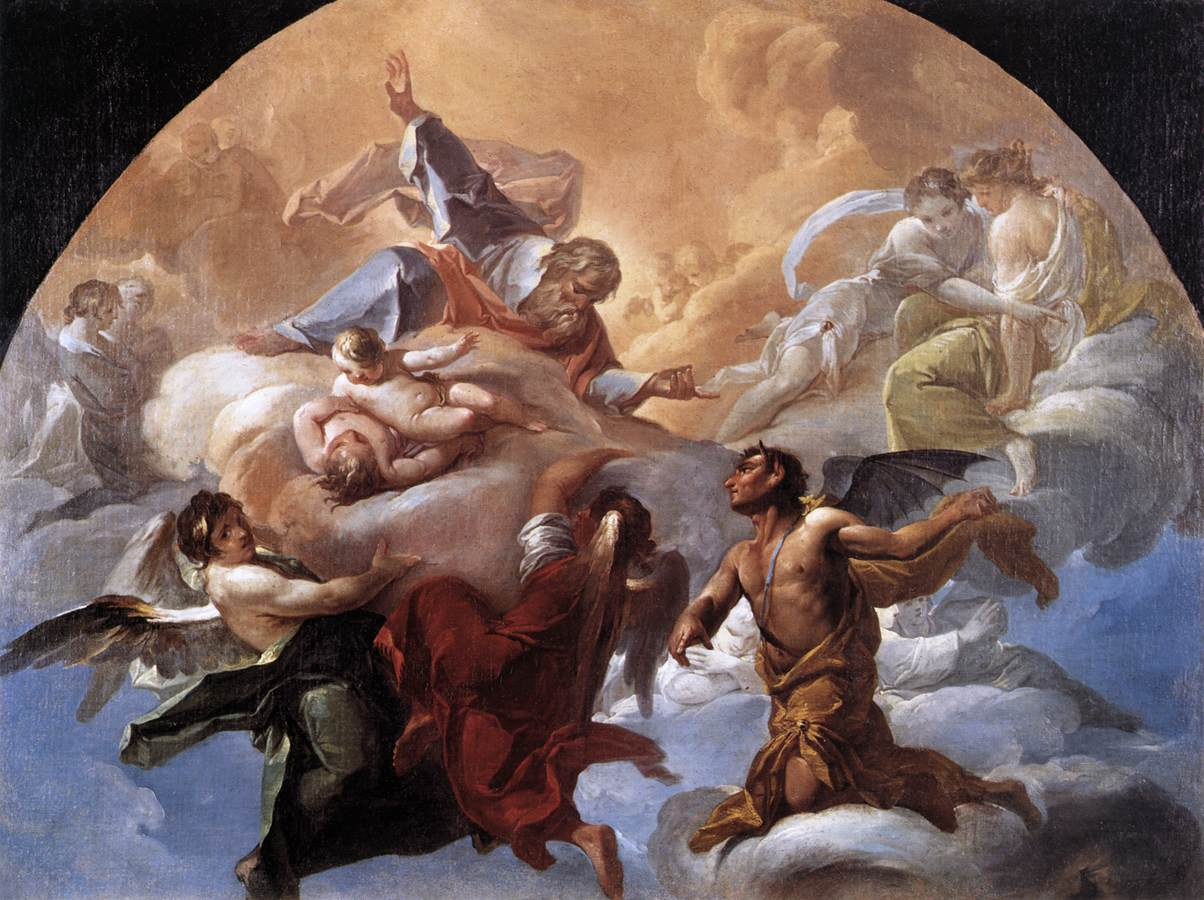
Satan before the Lord, 1750, Vatican Museums

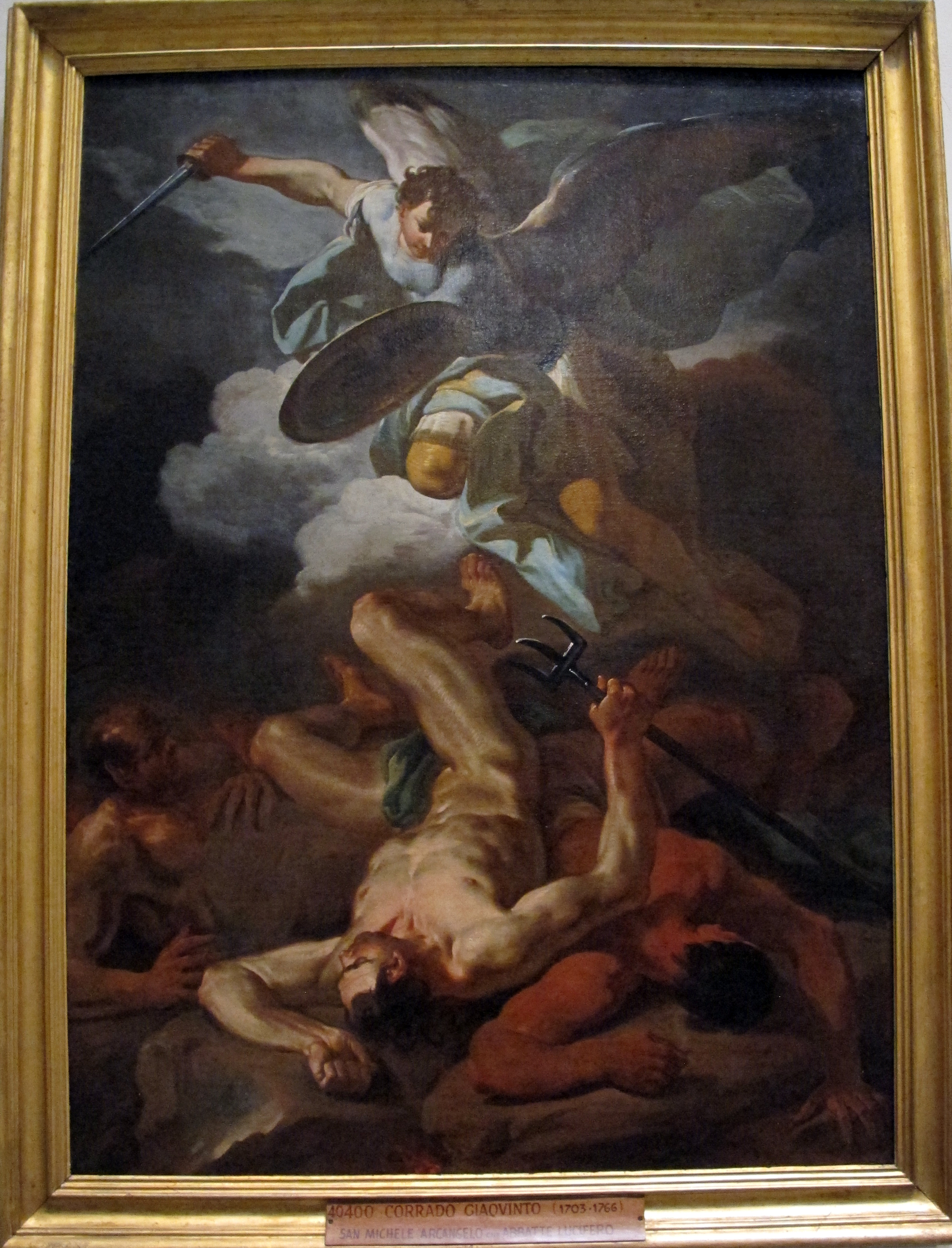
St. Michael and the devil, 1735, Vatican Museums

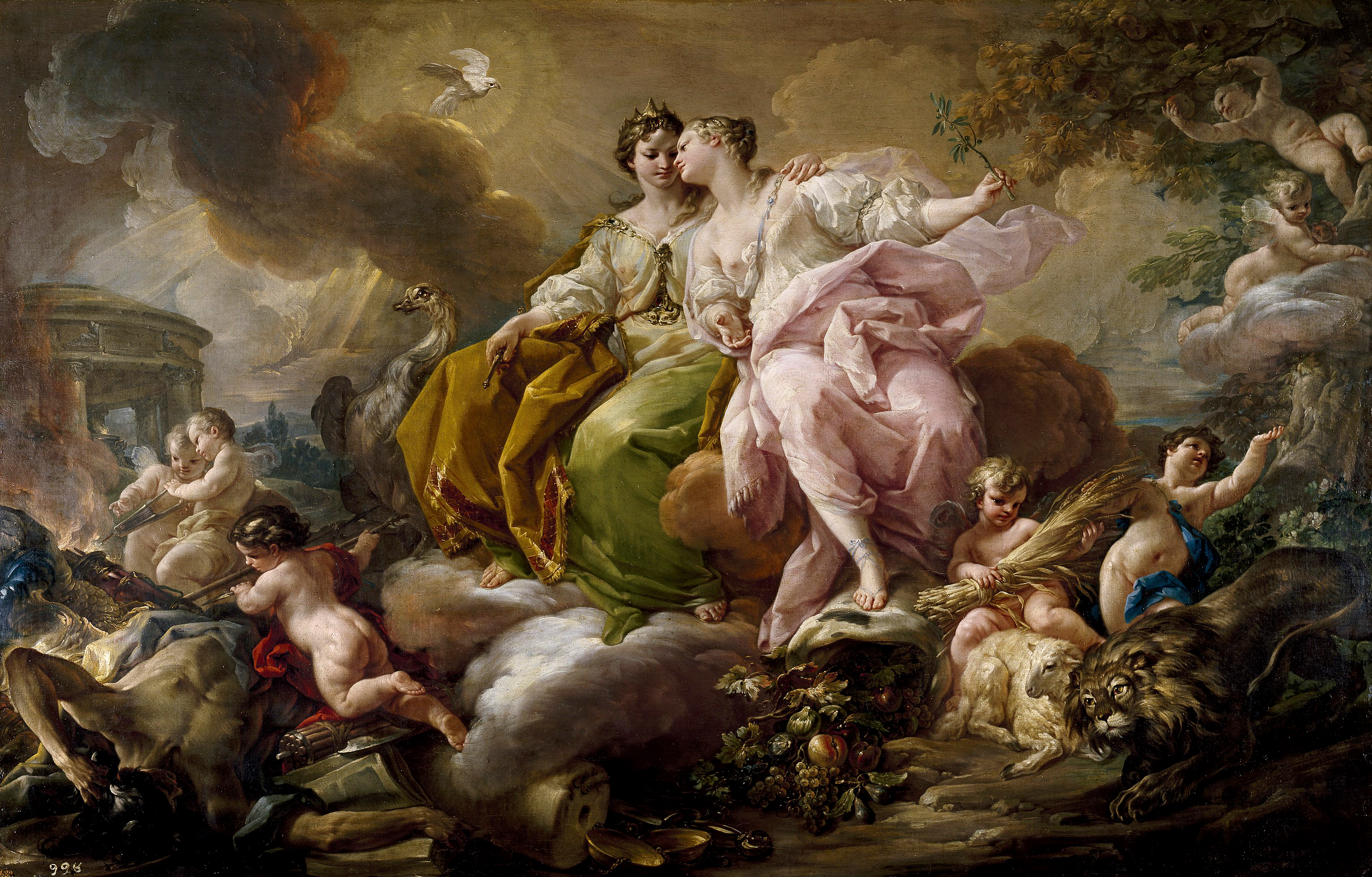
Allegories of Justice and Peace, 1754, Museo del Prado, Madrid

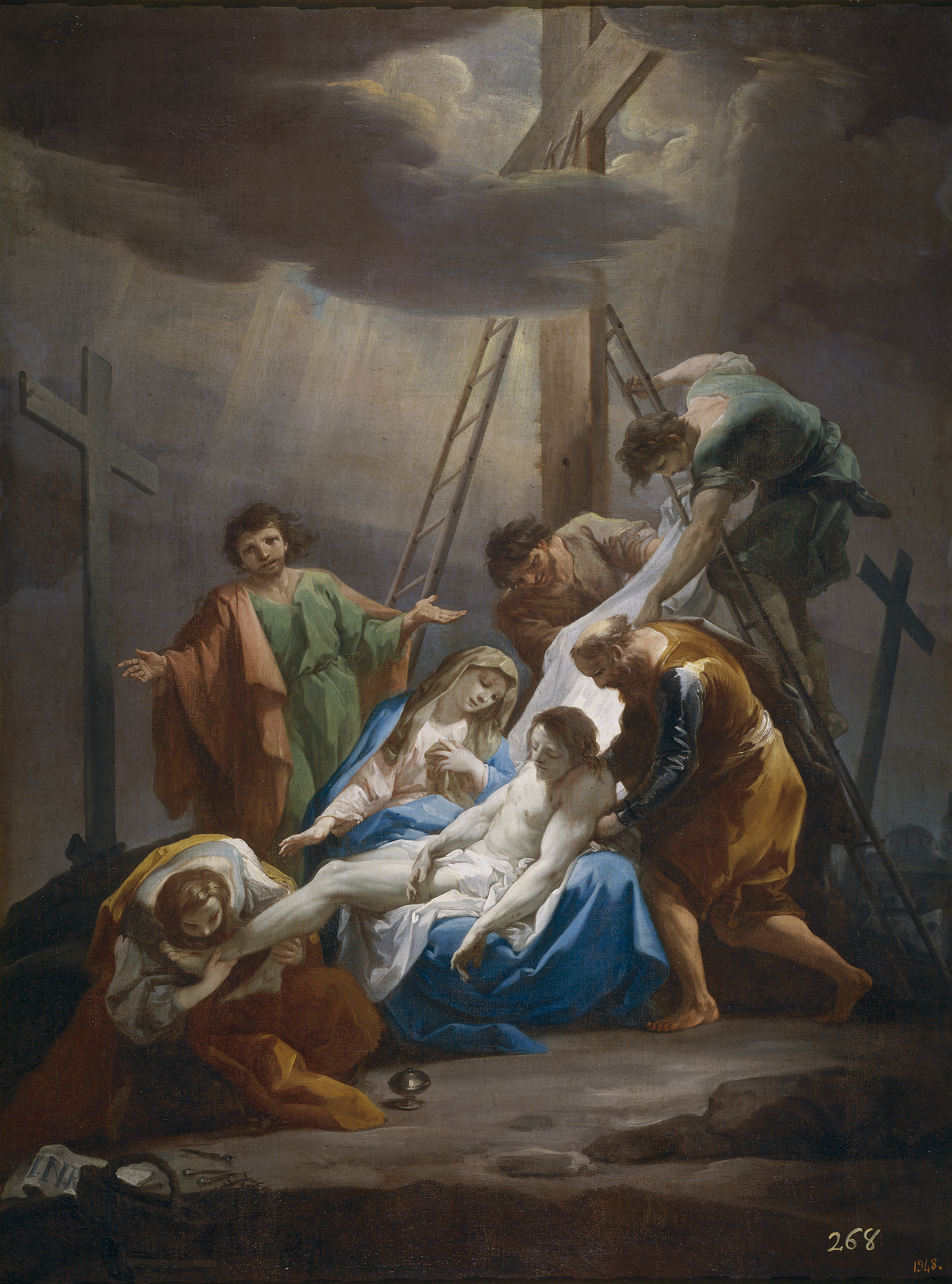
The Deposition, 1760, Museo del Prado, Madrid

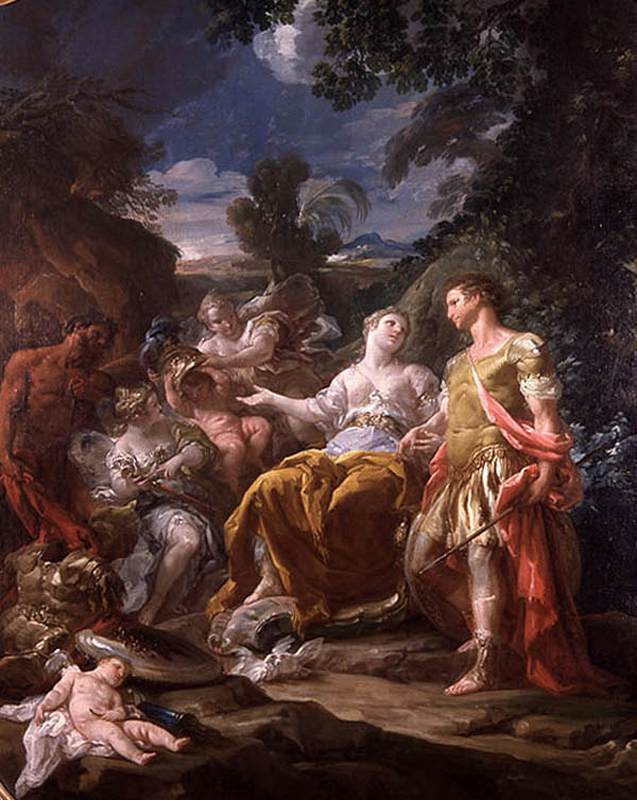
Venus Presenting Arms to Aeneas, 1750, Bowes Museum, Barnard Castle

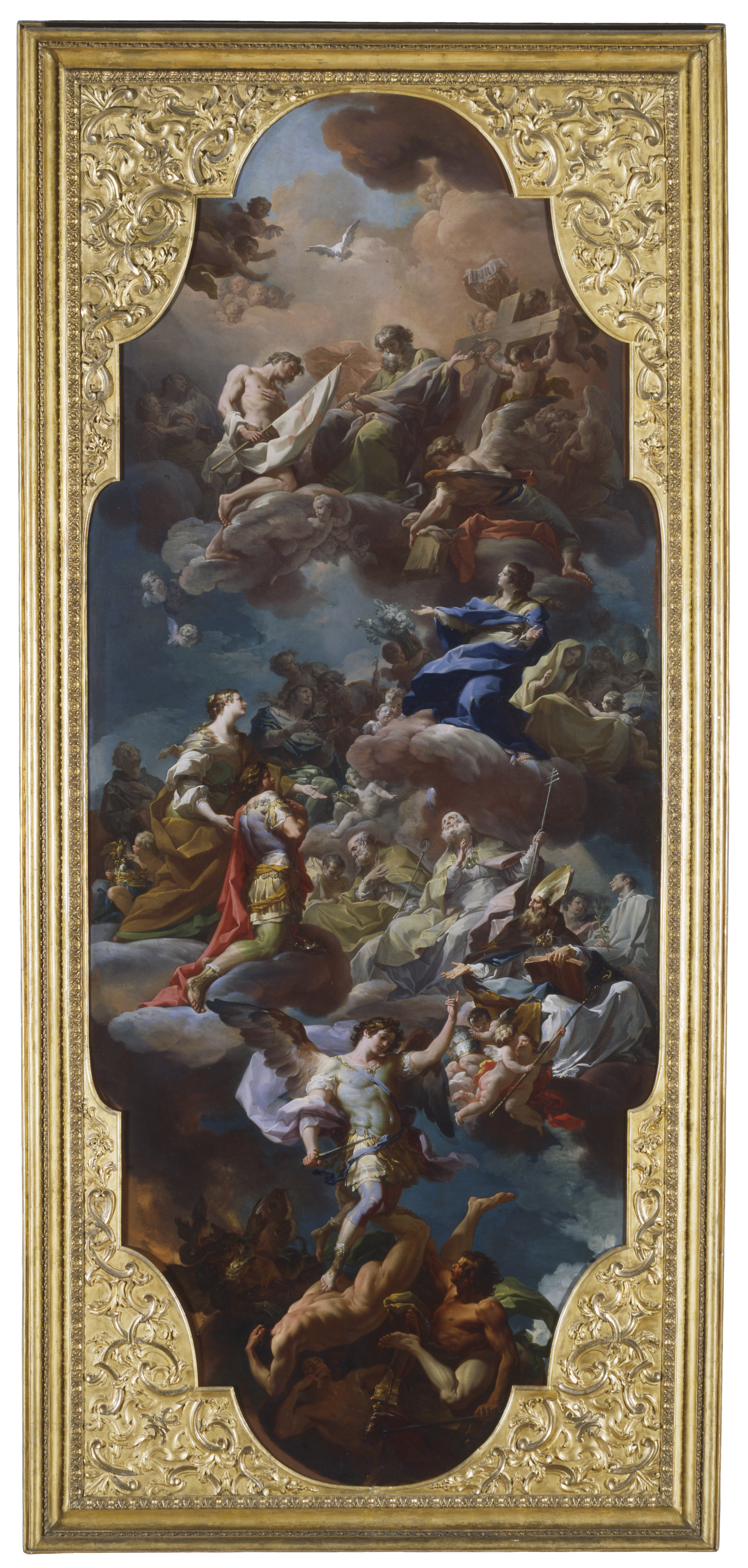
The Virgin presents Saint Helena and Constantine to the Trinity, 1741–42, Saint Louis Art Museum

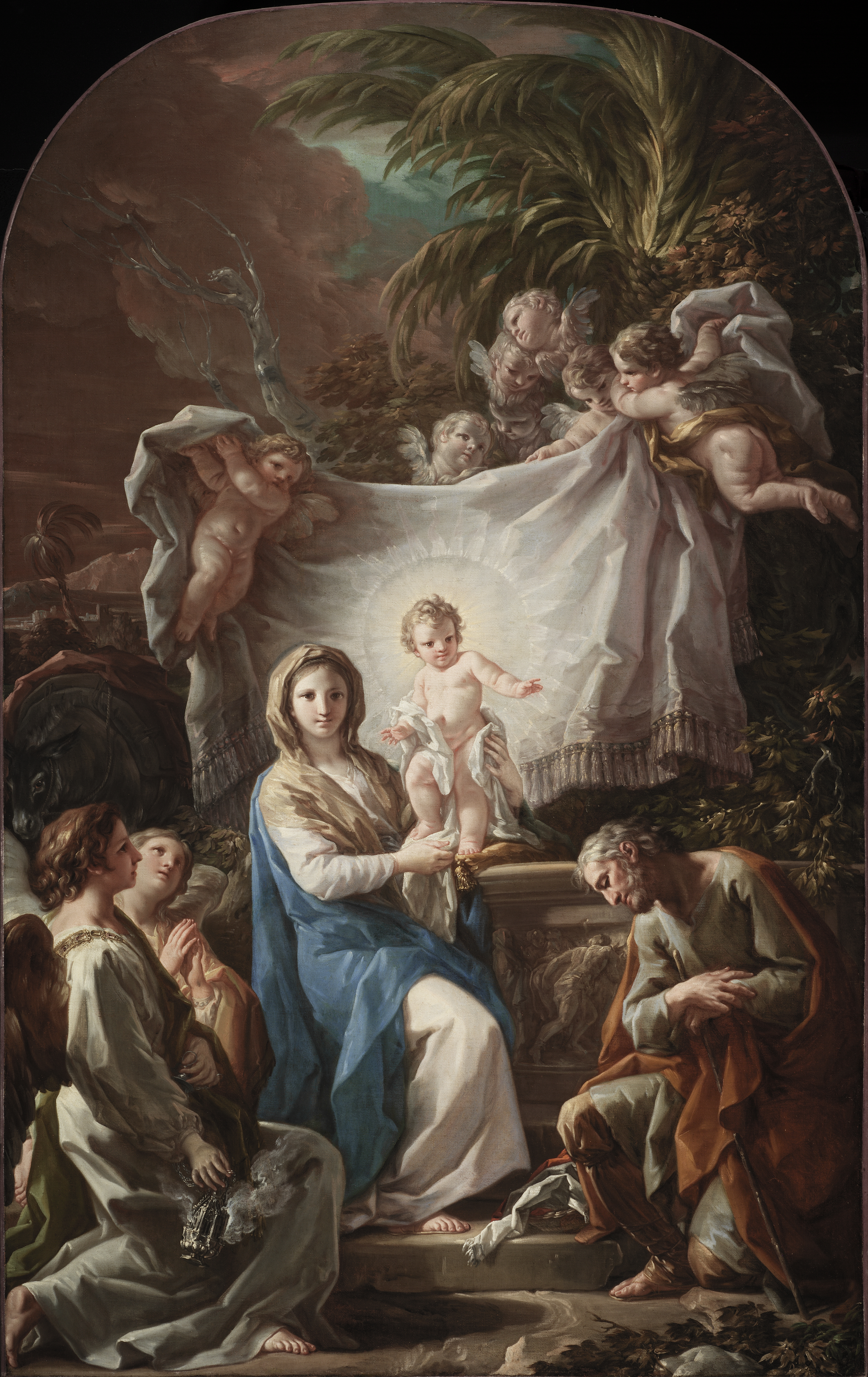
Rest on the flight to Egypt, 1764–65, Detroit Institute of Arts

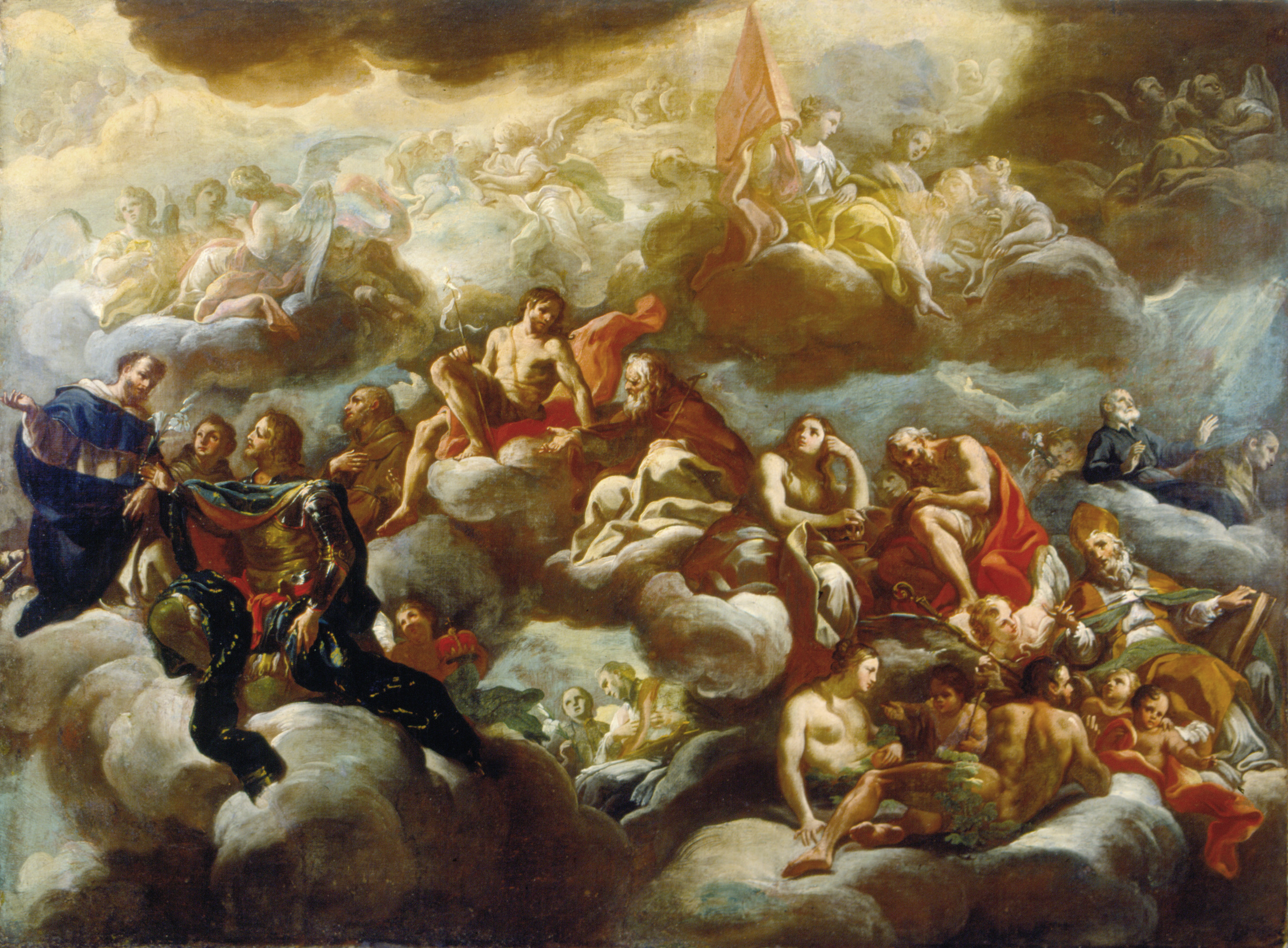
Apotheosis of St. Nicholas, 1733, Museu Nacional de Belas Artes, Rio de Janeiro

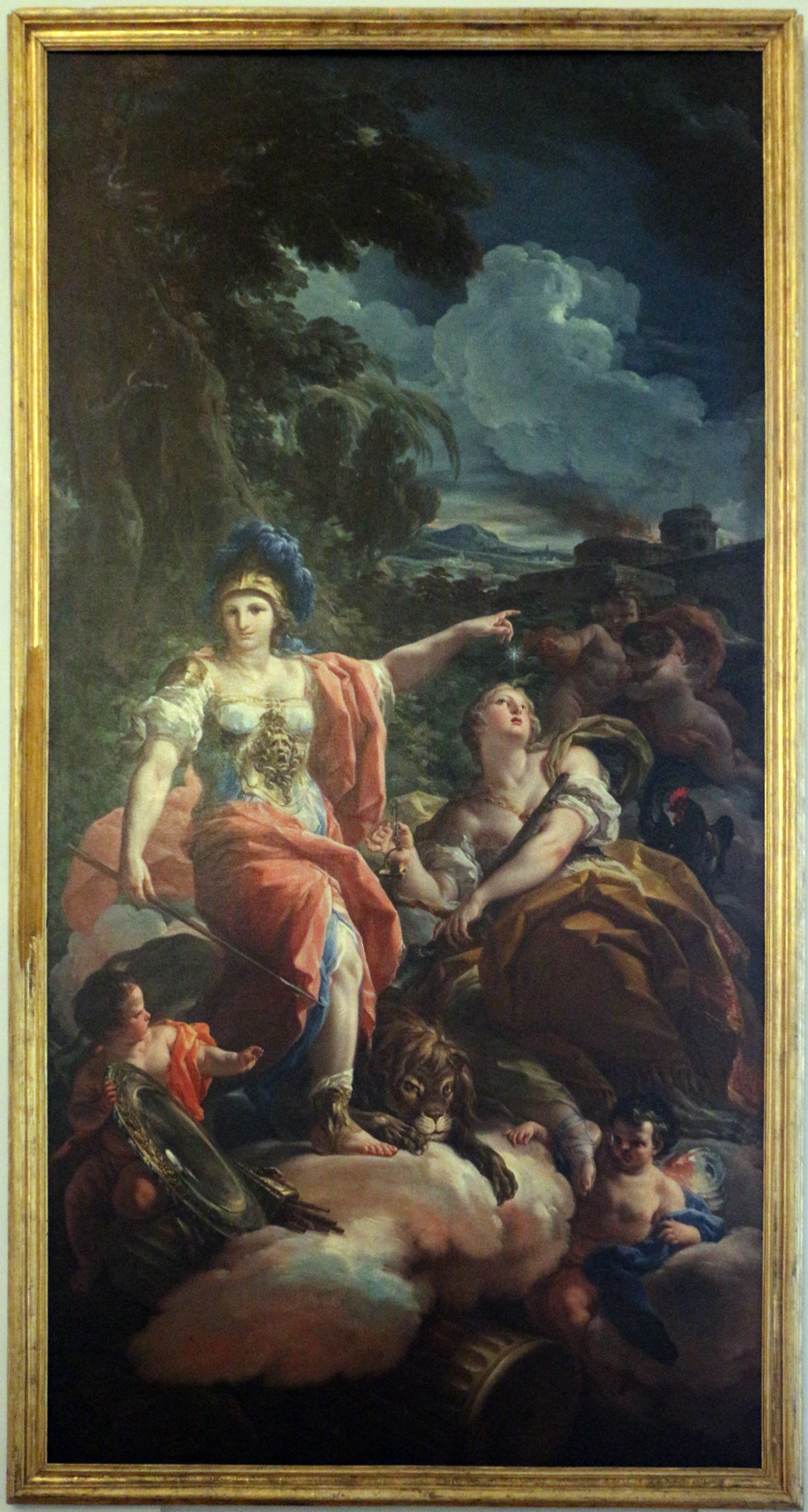
Allegory of fortress and vigilance, Royal Palace of Caserta

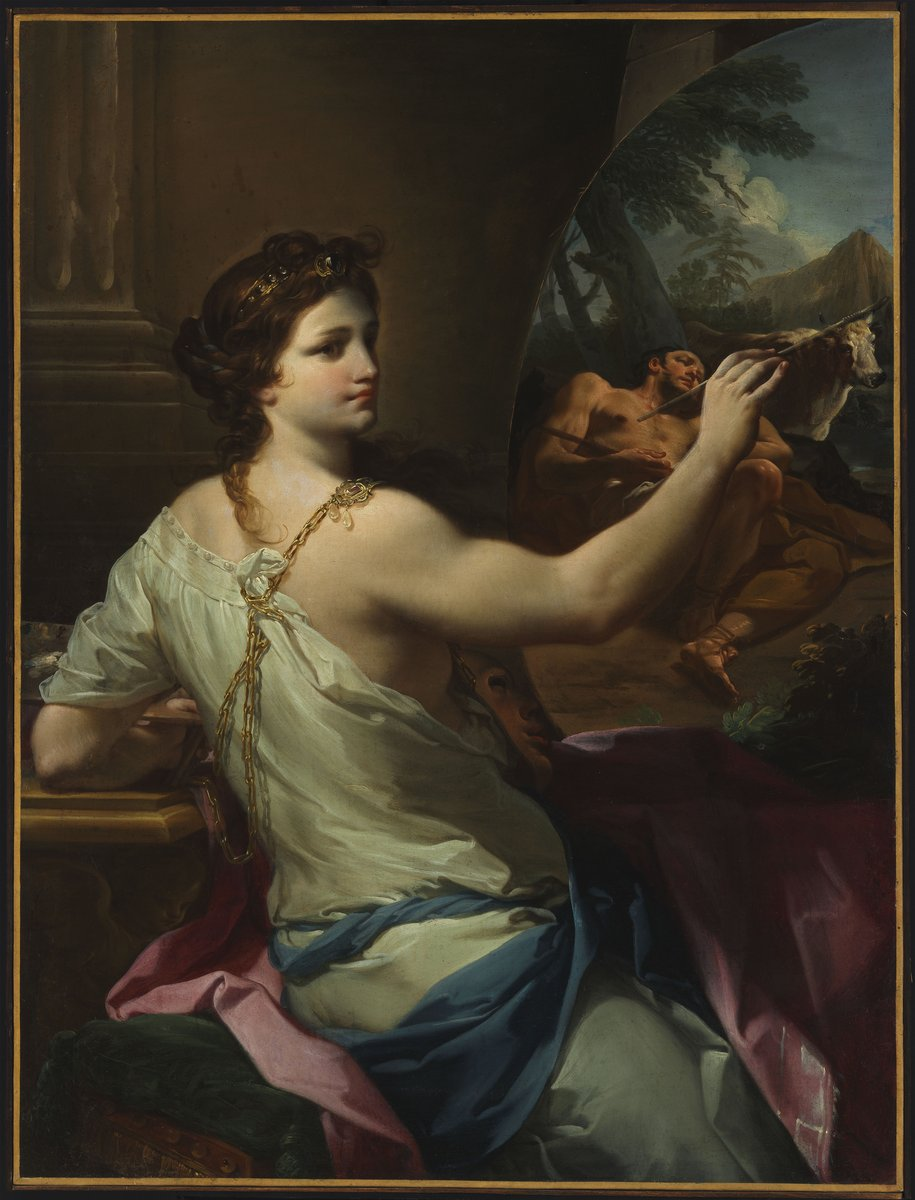
Allegory of Painting, Museum of Fine Arts (Budapest)

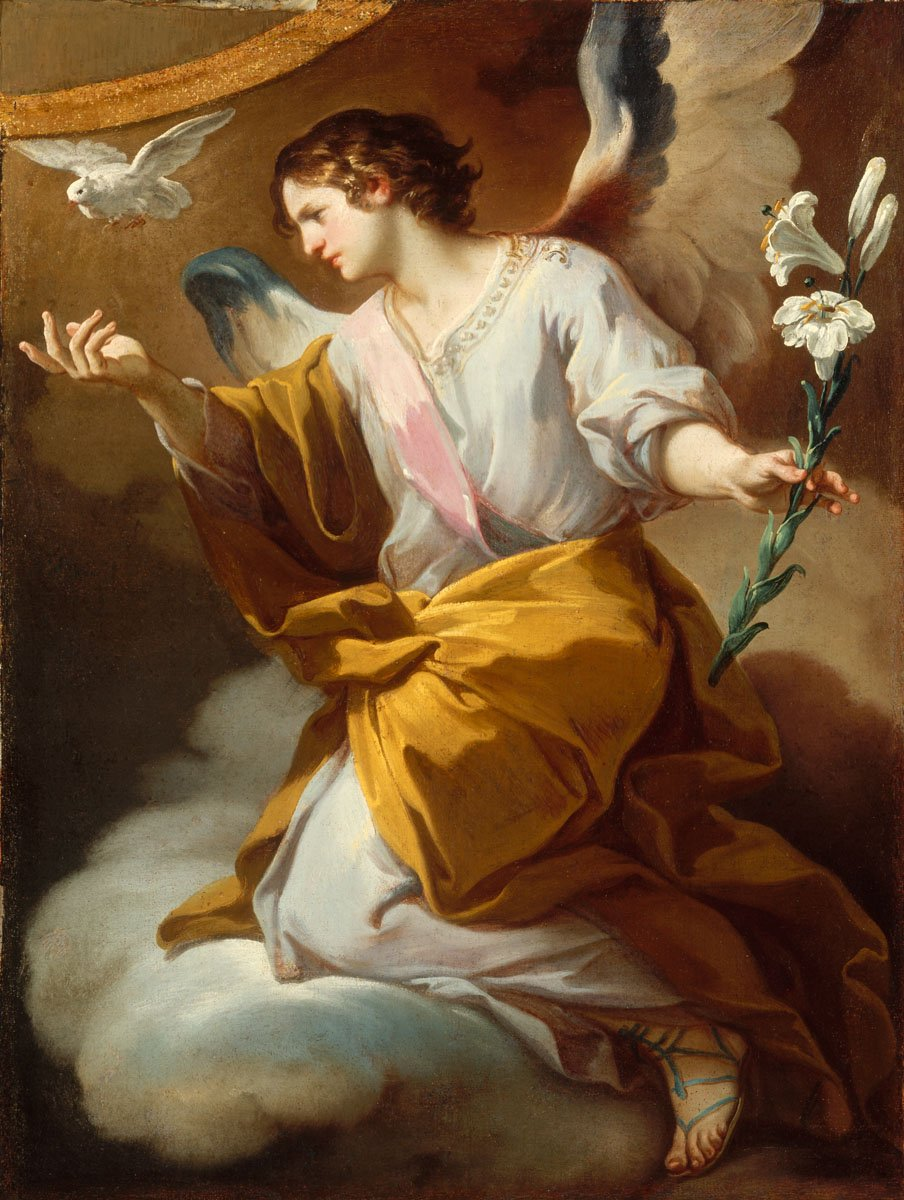
The Angel Annunciant, Museum of Fine Arts (Budapest)

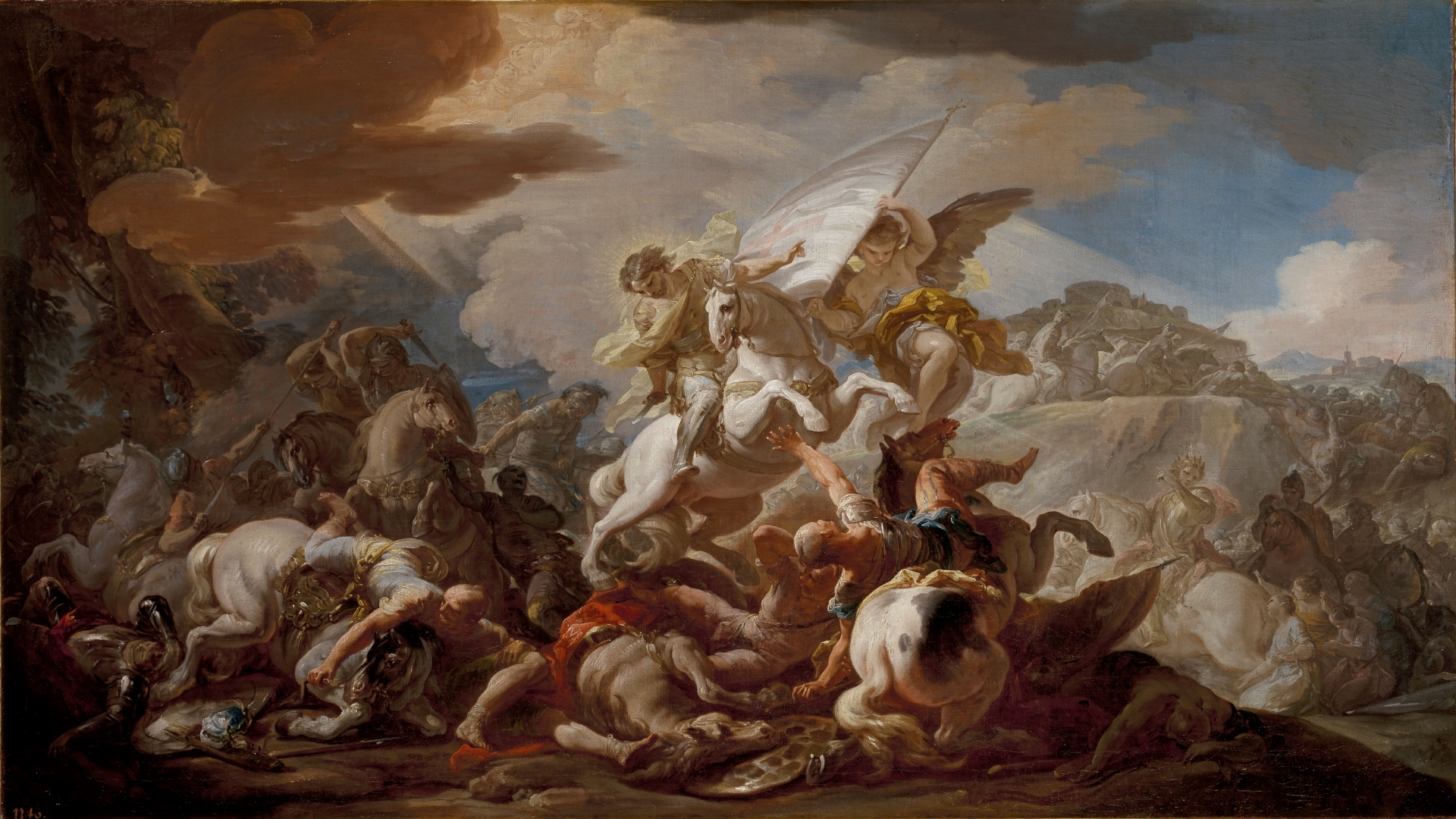
Battle of Clavijo, 1760, Museo del Prado, Madrid

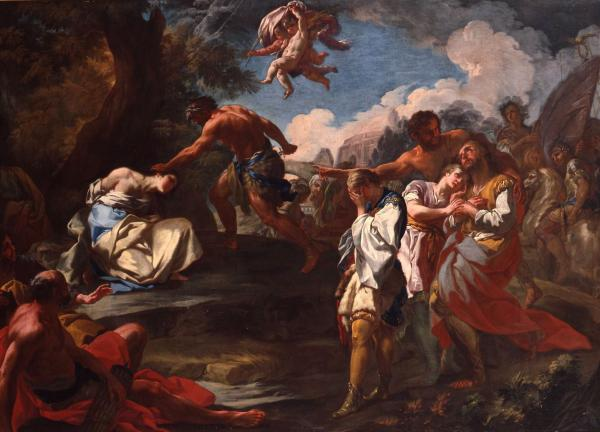
Martyrdom of Saints Marius, Martha, Audifax and Abacus, 1750, Musée Fesch, Ajaccio

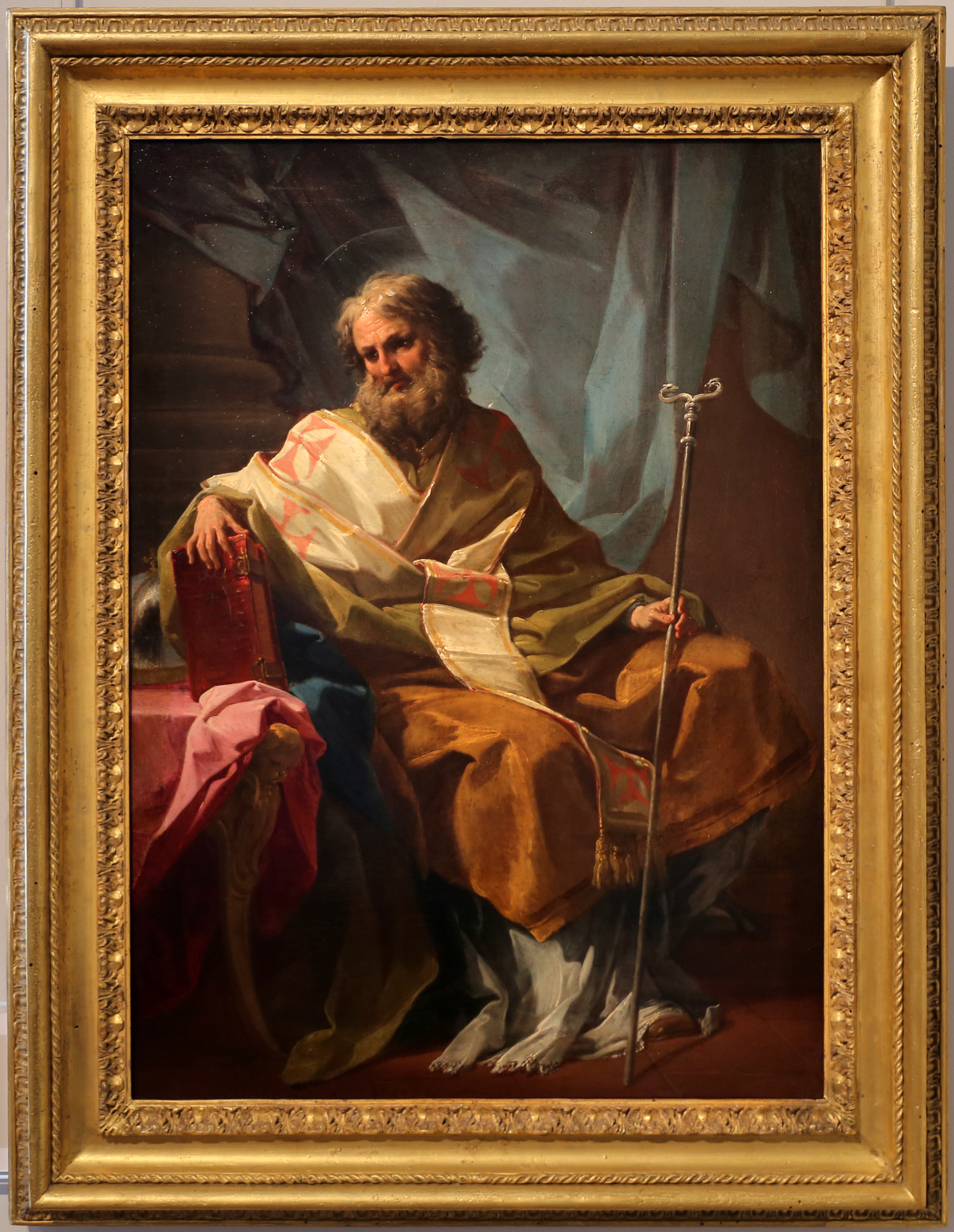
St. Nicholas of Bari, Musée Fesch

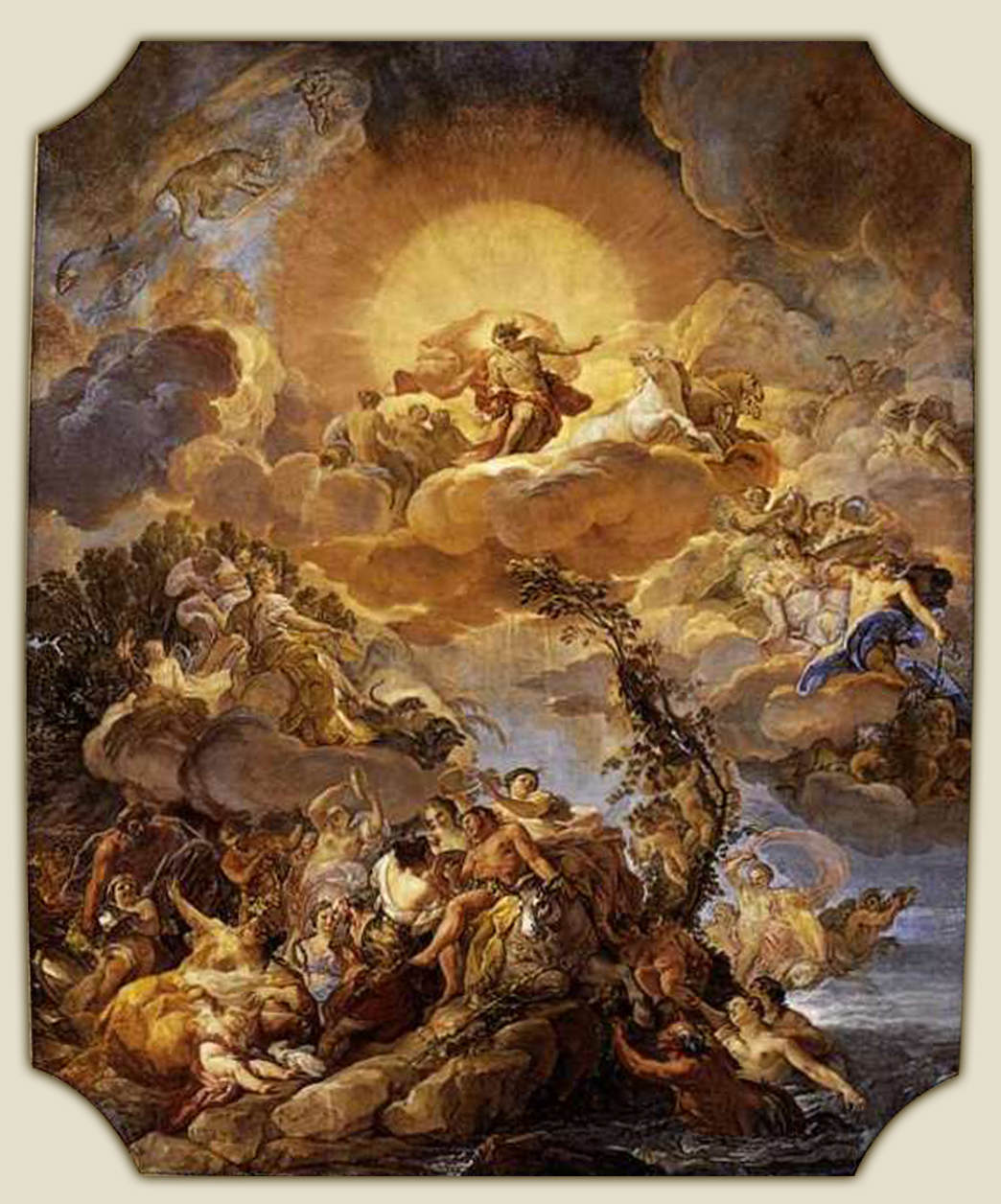
The Birth of the Sun and the Triumph of Bacchus, 1762–1763, fresco, Royal Palace of Madrid

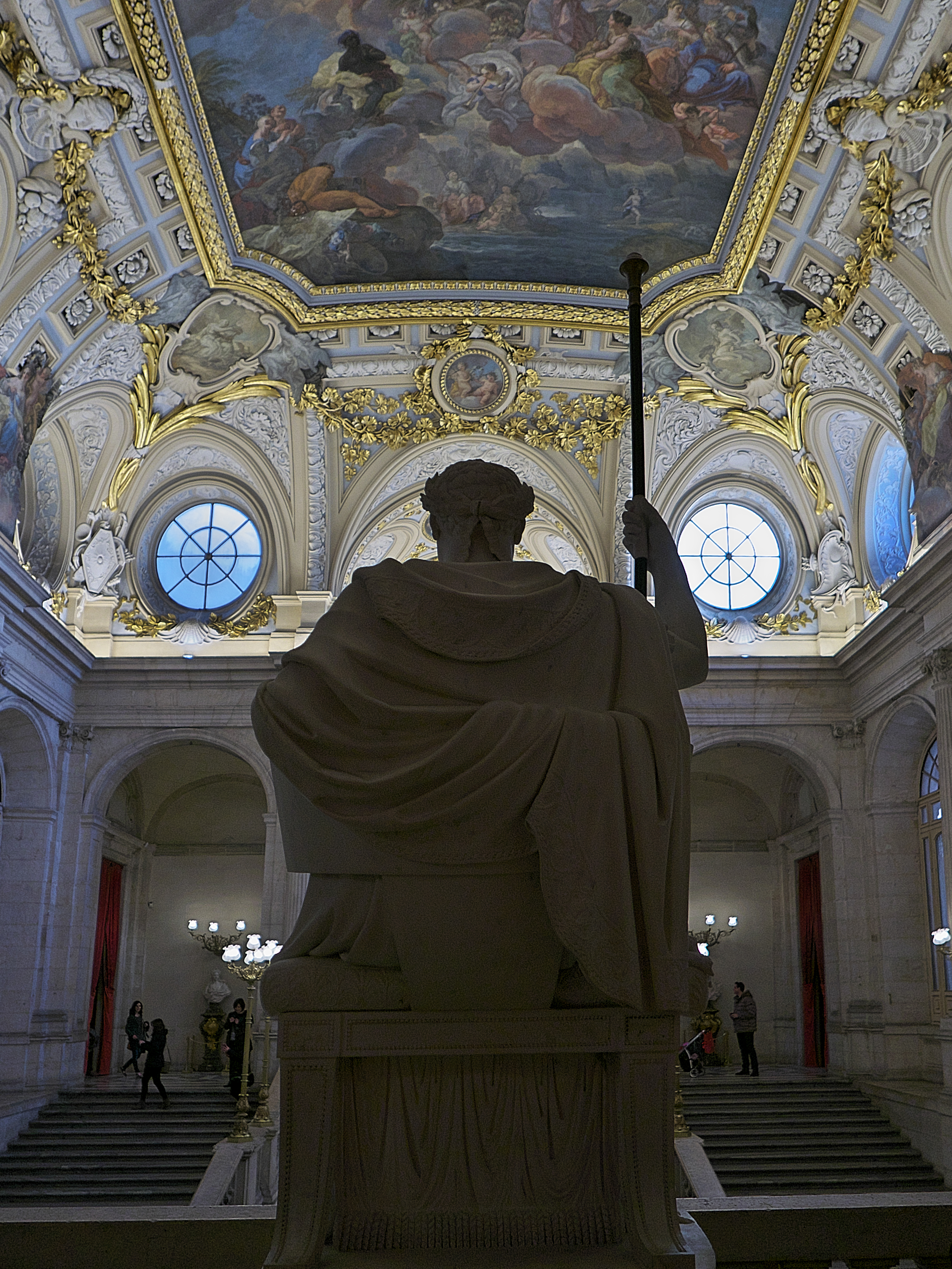
The Spanish monarchy that pays homage to Religion, Giaquinto's fresco above the main staircase in the Royal Palace of Madrid

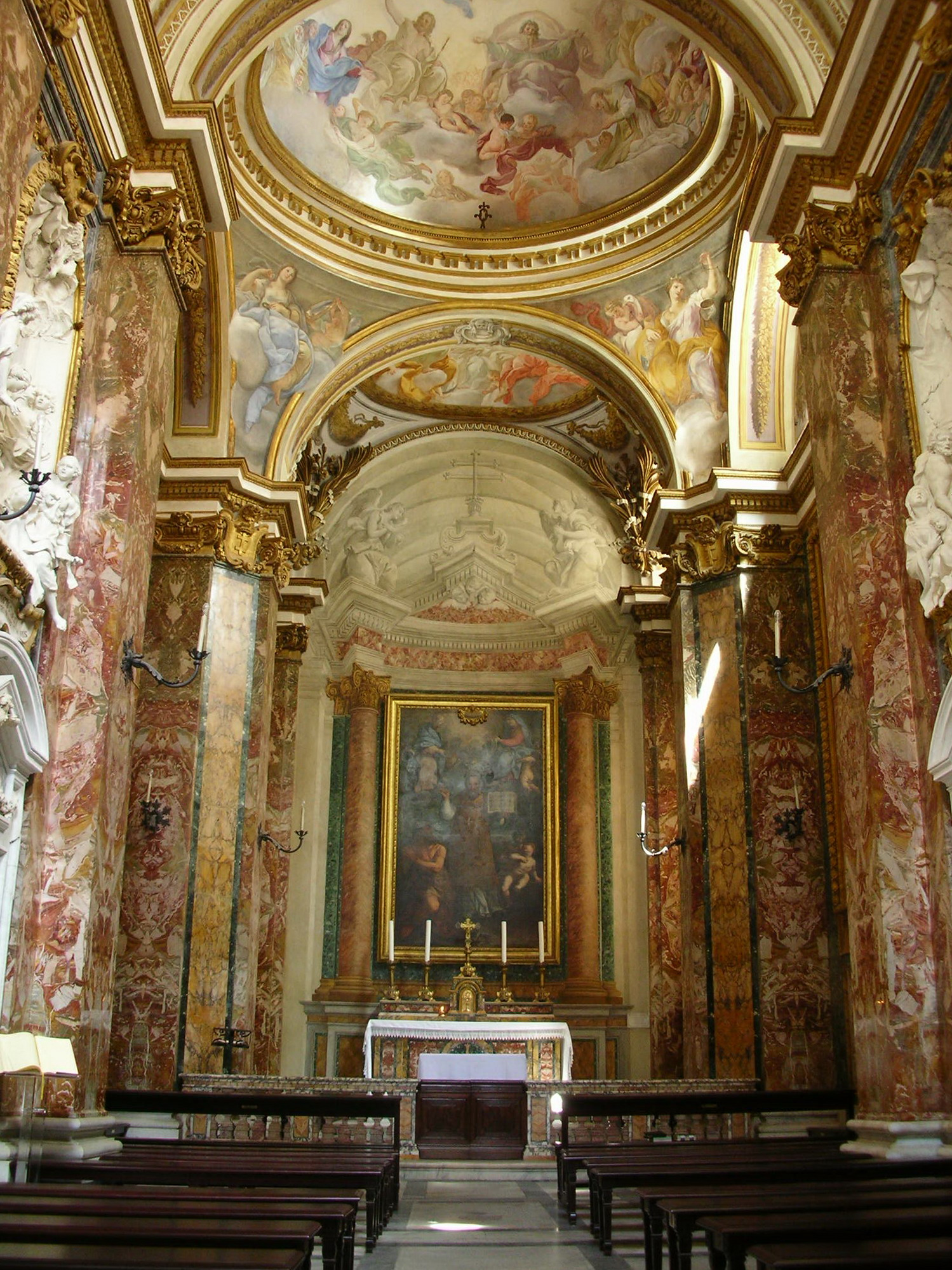
Interior of the church with frescoes by Corrado Giaquinto, 1731, San Nicola dei Lorenesi, Rome

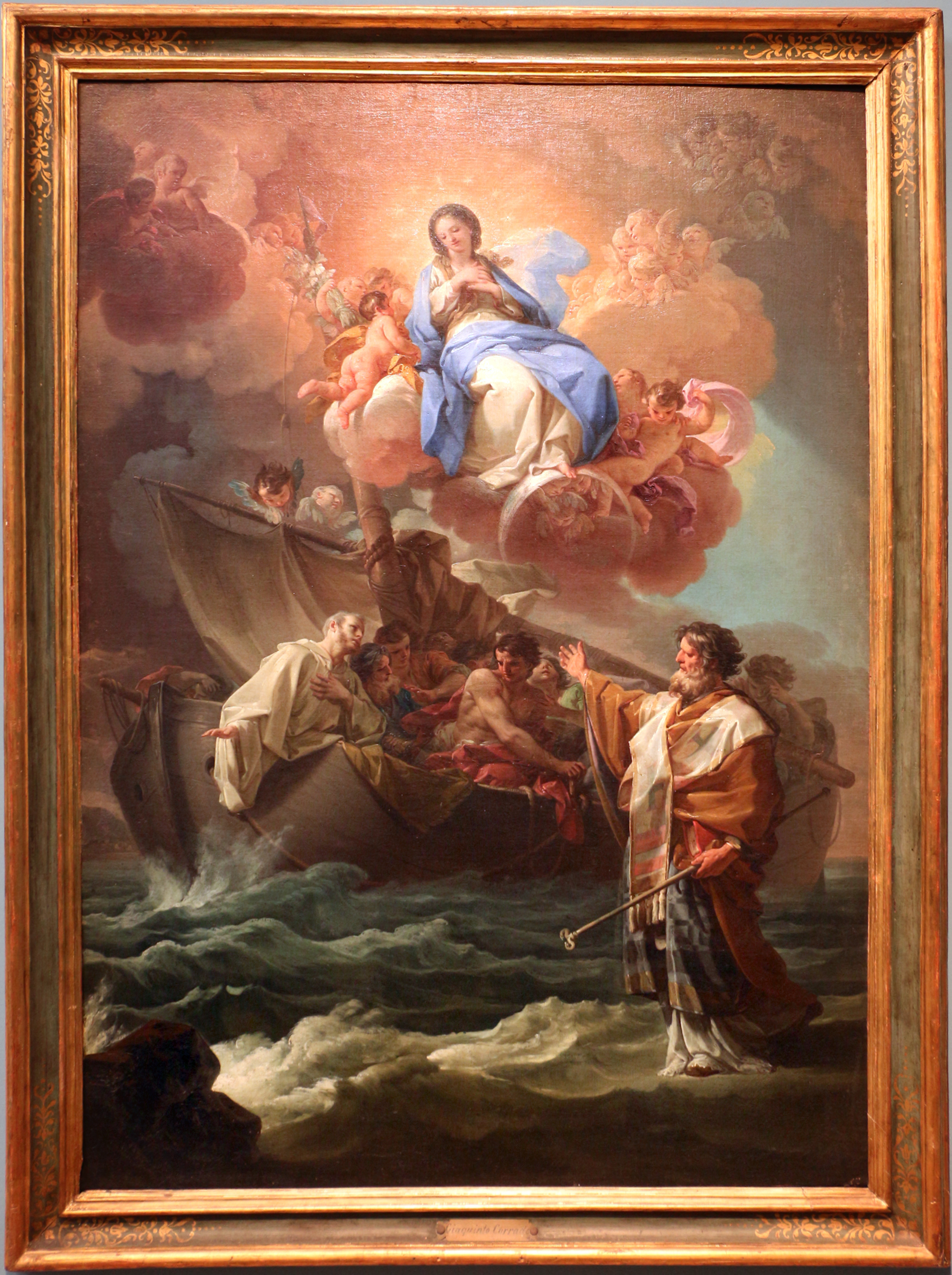
St. Nicholas saves the castaways, 1746, Pinacoteca metropolitana di Bari

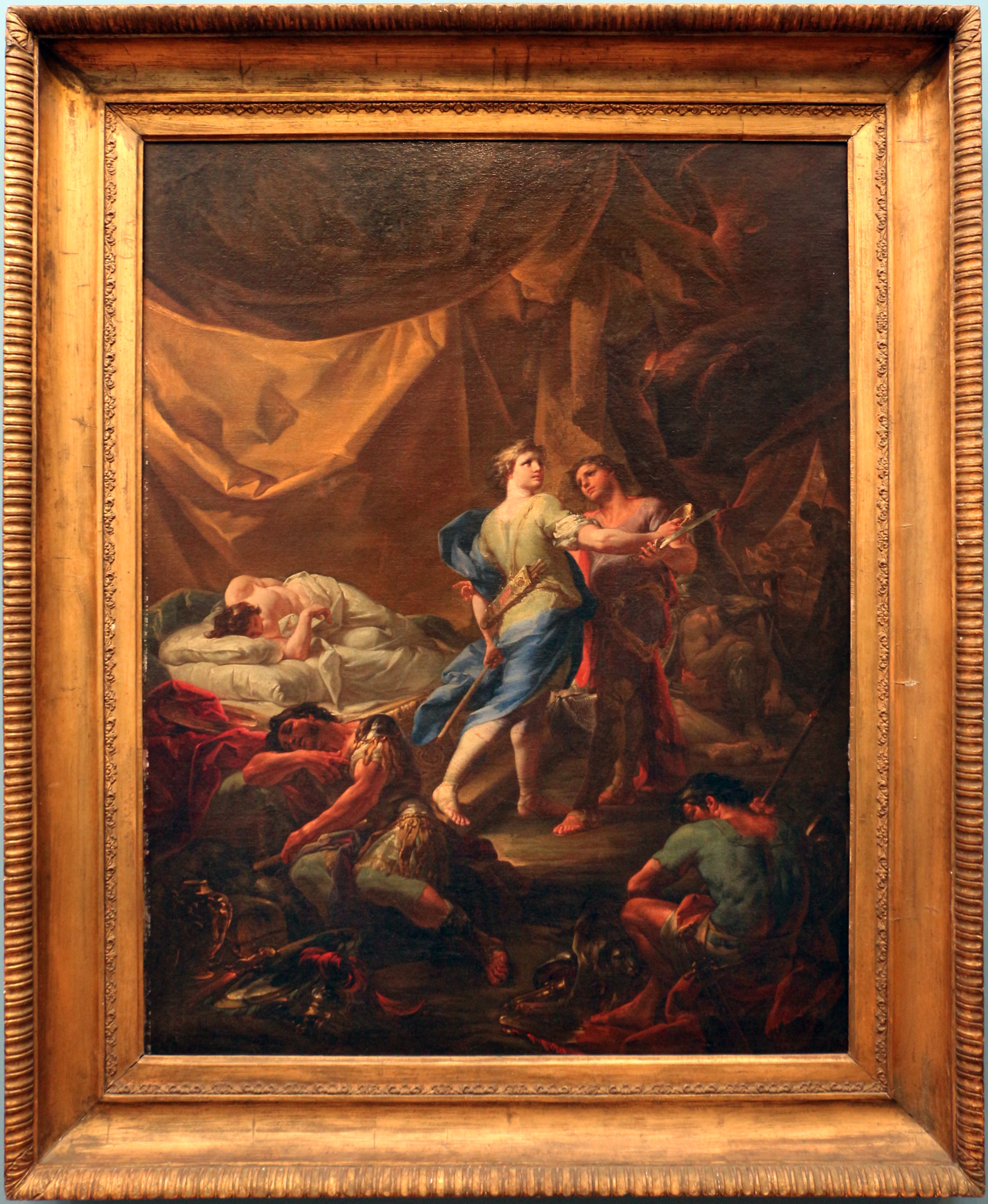
Ulysses and Diomedes in the Resus tent, Pinacoteca metropolitana di Bari

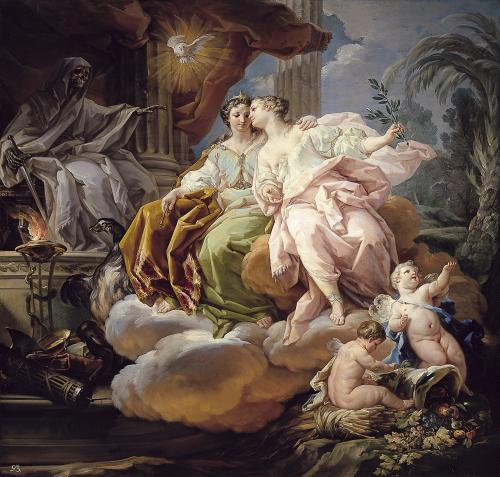
Allegories of Justice and Peace,1754, version for the Real Academia de Bellas Artes de San Fernando, Madrid.

== Sources ==
- Wittkower, Rudolf (1993). "14". Pelican History of Art, Art and Architecture Italy, 1600–1750. 1980. Penguin Books Ltd. p. 465.
- Urrea, Jesús (1977). La pintura italiana del siglo XVIII en España. Universidad de Valladolid.
- Italian Wikipedia entry
