= San Nicola dei Lorenesi =

Church building in Rome, Italy

Church of Saint Nicholas of the Lorrains
- Saint-Nicolas-des-Lorrains (in French)
- San Nicola dei Lorenesi (in Italian)
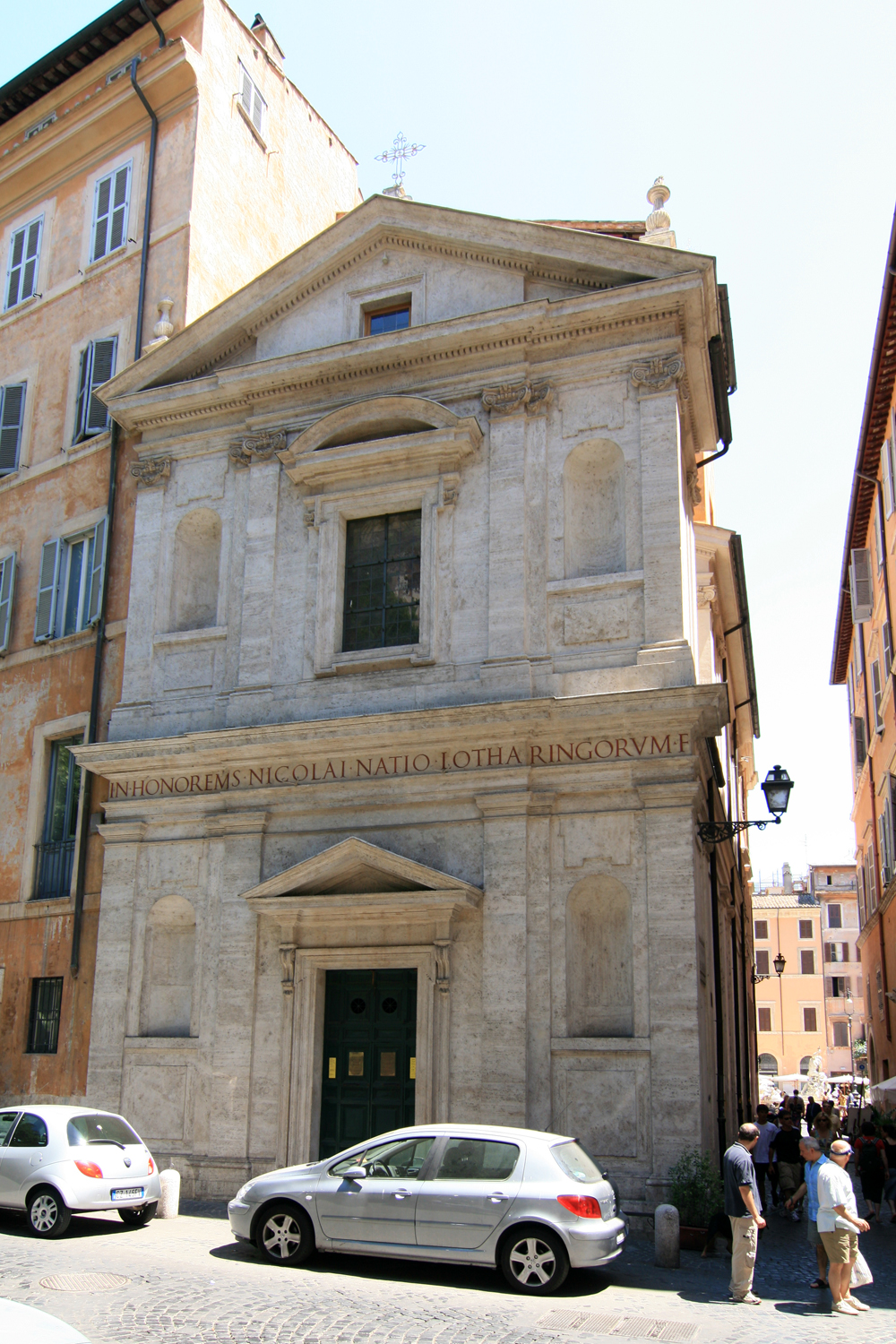
- Façade of San Nicola dei Lorenesi.National Church in Rome of France (Duchy of Lorraine).
- Click on the map for a fullscreen view
- 41°53′59.6″N 12°28′20.7″E
- Location: Largo Febo 17, Parione, Rome
- Country: Italy
- Denomination: Roman Catholic
- Tradition: Roman rite
- Website: Official website

History
- Status: national church
- Dedication: Nicholas of Myra and Andrew the Apostle
- Consecrated: 1636

Architecture
- Architect: François Desjardins
- Style: Baroque
- Completed: 1632

Administration
- Province: Rome

The Church of Saint Nicholas of the Lorrainers (Italian: San Nicola dei Lorenesi, French: Saint-Nicolas-des-Lorrains) is a Roman Catholic church dedicated to Saint Nicholas and the apostle Saint Andrew. It is one of the national churches in Rome dedicated to France (since the Duchy of Lorraine became part of France in 1766). Given to the Lorrainers by Pope Gregory XV in 1622, the pre-existing church of St. Nicholas was redesigned by Lorrainer architect François Desjardins (also called "Du Jardin" and italianized in "Francesco Giardini"), in 1632.

The church was thoroughly renovated in 2006 and entitled to the Community of Saint John.

== Interior ==
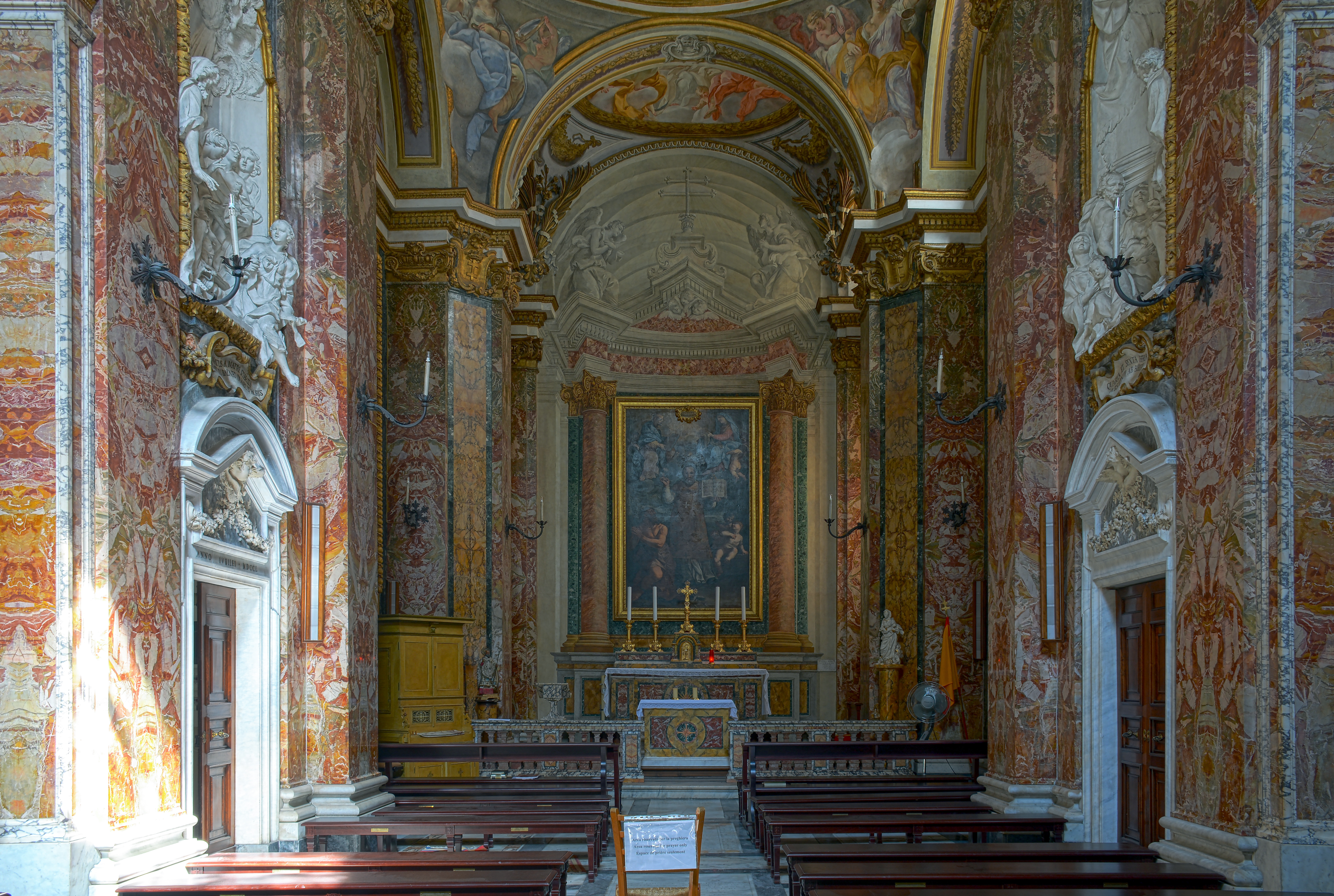
Interior of the church with frescoes by Corrado Giaquinto

The architecture of the interior is characterized by a quite sober but evident baroque style with decorative effects based on the use of white and pink marbles.

Many frescoes and paintings by Lorrainer painters of the 17th and 18th centuries also decorate the interior. In particular, two works by François Nicolas de Bar: "Saint Catherine" and "The Visitation".

In 1731, Corrado Giaquinto was commissioned to execute the frescoes: "Saint Nicholas water gush from cliff", "The three Theologic Virtues", "The three Cardinal Virtues" and in the cupola "The Paradise".

The French painter Nicolas Mellin is buried in San Nicola.
