= Turgut Reis Mosque =

Turgut Reis Mosque may refer to any of the following:

- Turgut Reis Mosque (Balchik) is a mosque in Balchik, Bulgaria
- Turgut Reis Mosque (Esenler) is a mosque in Istanbul, Turkey
- Turgut Reis Mosque (Sultanbeyli) is a mosque in Istanbul, Turkey
