= List of Bulgaria province name etymologies =

This is a list of the origins of the names of provinces of Bulgaria.

County name	Language of origin	First attested	Meaning	Cognates
Blagoevgrad Province	Slavic	1950	Named after the city of Blagoevgrad, itself a recent construct from Blagoev + the Slavic suffix -grad, "Blagoev's city". Blagoev is from the Bulgarian personal name Blagoy, from blag, "sweet, figuratively- gentle and kind". Named after Bulgarian Socialist Party founder Dimitar Blagoev.	Numerous place names with the Slavic component grad
Burgas Province	Latin	Antiquity, current form - 1727	Named after the city of Burgas, from the Latin word burgus, meaning a "tower, fort", after a local ancient Roman travel post.	Burgos, Lüleburgaz, Kumburgaz, Yarımburgaz, Kemerburgaz
Dobrich Province	Slavic	1882	Named after the city of Dobrich, after the 14th-century Dobrujan ruler Dobrotitsa, from the Slavic root dobr, "good"	
Gabrovo Province	Slavic	1430	Named after the city of Gabrovo, probably from the Slavic word gabar ("hornbeam") + the Slavic suffix -ovo	Grabow
Haskovo Province	Arabic, Turkish and Slavic	15th century	Named after the city of Haskovo, from Arabic خَاصّ, Turkish has ("special") + the Turkish köy ("village") + the Slavic suffix -ovo	Numerous places in Turkey bearing the name "Hasköy"
Kardzhali Province	Turkish and Arabic	Ottoman rule	Named after the city of Kardzhali, after the 14th-century Turkish conqueror Kırca Ali, from the Turkish name Kirca and the Arabic name Ali, derived from an Arabic root which means "high" or "Elevated".	
Kyustendil Province	Latin and Turkish	1559	Named after the city of Kyustendil, from Kösten, the Turkified name of the 14th-century local feudal Constantine Dragaš, from Latin constans, "steadfast" + the Turkish il "shire, county"	Constanța (Köstence)
Lovech Province	Slavic	mid-11th century	Named after the city of Lovech, possibly from the Slavic root lov, "hunting" + the Slavic suffix -ech	Łowicz
Montana Province	Latin	Antiquity	Named after the city of the same name, formerly called Mihailovgrad, and renamed in 1993 after the nearby ancient Roman city of Municipio Montanensium, from Latin mons, "mountain".	Montana
Pazardzhik Province	Persian, Turkic	Ottoman rule	Named after the city of Pazardzhik, from pazar, the Turkified word of the Persian bāzār, "market" + the Turkic diminutive suffix -cık, "small"	Novi Pazar
Pernik Province	Slavic	12th century	Named after the city of Pernik, probably from the name of the Slavic god Perun + the Slavic suffix -nik or -ik or from a local boyar named Perin.	
Pleven Province	Slavic	Hungarian charter of 1270	Named after the city of Pleven, from the Slavic root plev ("weed") + the Slavic suffix or ending -en	Pljevlja
Plovdiv Province	Thracian, possibly Slavic and Greek	15th century	Named after the city of Plovdiv, a Slavicized variant of the earlier Thracian name Pulpudeva, from Thracian deva "city" and Thracian puplpu, which can mean "lake." Or it may be the Thracian form of the Greek name Philip "horselover", after Philip II, possibly including the Slavic suffix ov in the middle as the suffixes for family names. In earlier times in Western Europe and elsewhere it was known as Philipopolis, so named by Philip II of Macedon after he conquered it in the 4th century BCE.	
Razgrad Province	Persian and Slavic	1573	Named after the city of Razgrad, probably from the Slavic god Hors, whose name comes from the Persian xoršid, or alternatively from the Persian word hezar "thousand", or from Arabic hissar "fortress". + the Slavic suffix -grad.	Hârșova
Rousse Province	unknown	1380s	Named after the city of Rousse (more accurately Ruse), probably from the root *ru- ("river", "stream") or *h₁reudʰ-ó- ("red" or "blonde"). Other suggestions include Russian settlement, a derivation from Russocastrom, an unattested tribe of Getae (riusi) or the pagan practice of Rusalii	
Shumen Province	Hebrew or Slavic	12th century	Named after the city of Shumen, either from the Slavic word shuma ("forest" or "verdure") + the Slavic suffix or ending -en or from Simeonis, after Simeon I of Bulgaria (itself from Hebrew Shim'on, "harkening", "listening")	Šumadija? Šumava?
Silistra Province	Daco-Thracian or Latin	early 13th century	Named after the city of Silistra (old name Drastar, from Celtic Durostorum), possibly from the Ancient Greek name of the Danube, Istrus, itself borrowed from Thracian. or from the Latin words "silo" and "stra", "awl" and "strategy".	
Sliven Province	Slavic	17th century	Named after the city of Sliven, from the Slavic word sliv ("pour, confluence") + the Slavic suffix or ending -en	
Smolyan Province	Slavic	after 1878	Named after the city of Smolyan, itself after the local Slavic tribe of the Smolyani, probably cognate to the Slavic word smola ("resin")	Smolany, Smolany Dąb, Smolany Sadek, Smolensk, etc.
Sofia	Greek	From Greek Sophia ("wisdom"), after the Saint Sofia Church	Sophia	
Sofia Province	see above	see above	Named after the city of Sofia, see above	see above
Stara Zagora Province	Slavic	Middle Ages (region)	Named after the city of Stara Zagora, from the Slavic root star ("old") and the name of the medieval region of Zagore ("beyond the [Balkan] mountains" in Slavic)	Nova Zagora, Zagora, Zagori, Zagorje, Záhorie, Zagorsk
Targovishte Province	Slavic translation of Turkish	1934	Named after the city of Targovishte, from the Slavic root targ ("marketplace") + the Slavic placename suffix -ishte, "market town" (a calque of the Ottoman Turkish Eski Cuma, "old market")	Târgoviște, Trgovište
Varna Province	Unknown, possibly (1) Proto-Slavic, or (2) Proto-Indo-European (PIE), or (3) Iranian	Theophanes Confessor (8th century) (4) Varangians	Named after the city of Varna, (1) possible Proto-Slavic etymology: varn ("black"), non-metathesized group CorC, later vran; or from Bulgarian var ("lime"), (2) possible PIE etymology: PIE root we-r- (water); cognate: Varuna (3) possible Iranian etymology: var ("camp", "fortress")	(1) Warnow/Warnemünde, Varniai, Vranje? (2) Varanasi? (3) Varosha, Hungarian Vár?
Veliko Tarnovo Province	Slavic and possibly Latin	1180s	Named after the city of Veliko Tarnovo, from the Slavic root velik ("great") and the root tarn ("thorn") or from Latin turis ("tower") or tres naves ("three ships", referring to the three hills) + the Slavic suffix -ovo	Tarnów, Trnava, Tyrnavos
Vidin Province	Celtic	Antiquity or Middle Ages, current form since 1570	Named after the city of Vidin, from the ancient Celtic name Dononia, "fortified hill", through Roman Bononia and finally Bulgarian Bdin, Badin. The name is most likely derived from the Slavic word for viewpoint Vidik which creates a parallel with Dononia for a fortified hill.	Bologna
Vratsa Province	Slavic	16th century	Named after the city of Vratsa, named after the Vratitsa Pass nearby, from the Slavic word vrata ("gate") + the Slavic diminutive placename suffix -itsa, "little gate".	Vrata, Mehedinţi
Yambol	Greek and possibly Latin	Ottoman rule (current form)	Named after the city of Yambol, from Diambouli, from Di after Diocletian or Dios (Zeus) + the Greek polis "city"	

== See also ==
- Provinces of Bulgaria
- Bulgarian placename etymology
