= Turgutreis (disambiguation) =

Turgutreis, named after Turgut Reis, is a neighbourhood of the municipality and district of Bodrum, Muğla Province, Turkey.

Turgutreis or Turgut Reis may also refer to:

- Ottoman battleship Turgut Reis
- TCG Turgutreis (S 342), ex-USS Bergall, a Balao-class submarine acquired in 1958 and decommissioned in 1983
- TCG Turgutreis (F 241), a Yavuz-class frigate commissioned in 1988
- Turgutreis, Esenler, neighborhood in Esenler, Turkey
- Turgut Reis Mosque (Balchik) is a mosque in Balchik, Bulgaria
