= List of botanical gardens in Bulgaria =

Botanical gardens in Bulgaria sometimes have collections consisting entirely of native and endemic species; most have a collection that include plants from around the world. There are botanical gardens and arboreta in all states and territories of Bulgaria, most are administered by local governments, some are privately owned.

- Sofia University Botanical garden, Balchik – Balchik
- Sofia University Botanical garden, Varna – Varna
- Sofia University Botanical garden, Sofia – Sofia
- Bulgarian Academy of Sciences Botanical garden – Sofia
- University of Forestry Botanical garden – Sofia
