= Tatar quarter =

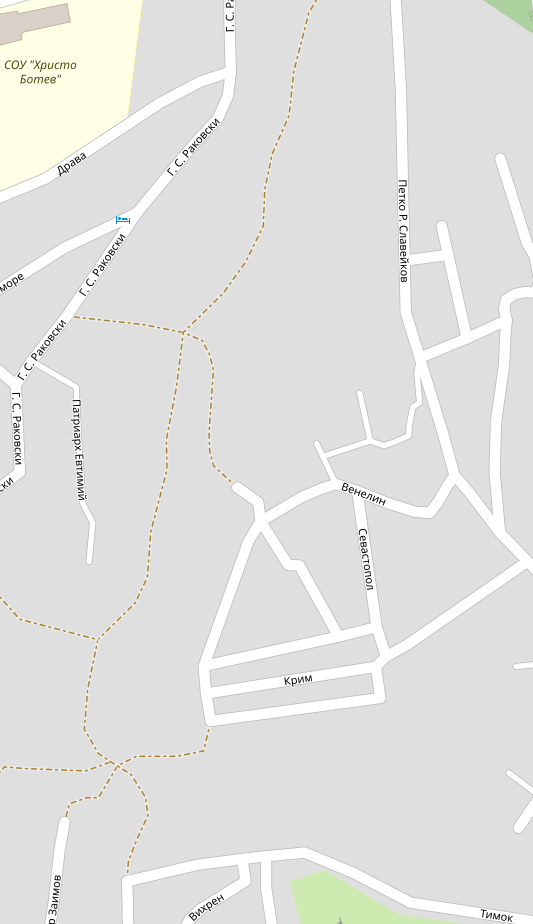
Tatar quartar

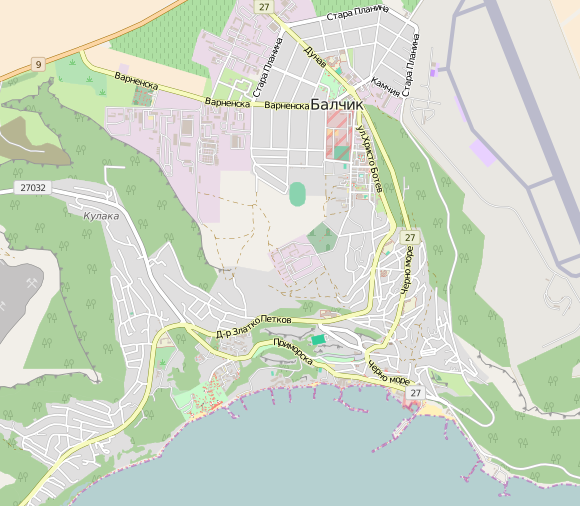
Location of Tatar quarter in Balchik

The Tatar quarter (Bulgarian: Татарската махала, Crimean Tatar: Tatar maallesi), is a location where most of Tatars in Balchik in Bulgaria live. Often thought to be in Varna it is actually located in the town of Balchik. Great artists like George Barbieri or Ecaterina Cristescu Delighioz have painted different views of the district or streets. There are even streets in Balchik named Sevastopol after the city in Crimea, which has a large Tatar population. (Bulgarian: ул. Севастопол "ul. Sevastopol") or Crimea (Bulgarian: ул.Крим "ul. Krim").
