= Temple of Cybele, Balchik =

Archaeological site in Bulgaria

Coordinates: 43.4058°N 28.1677°E

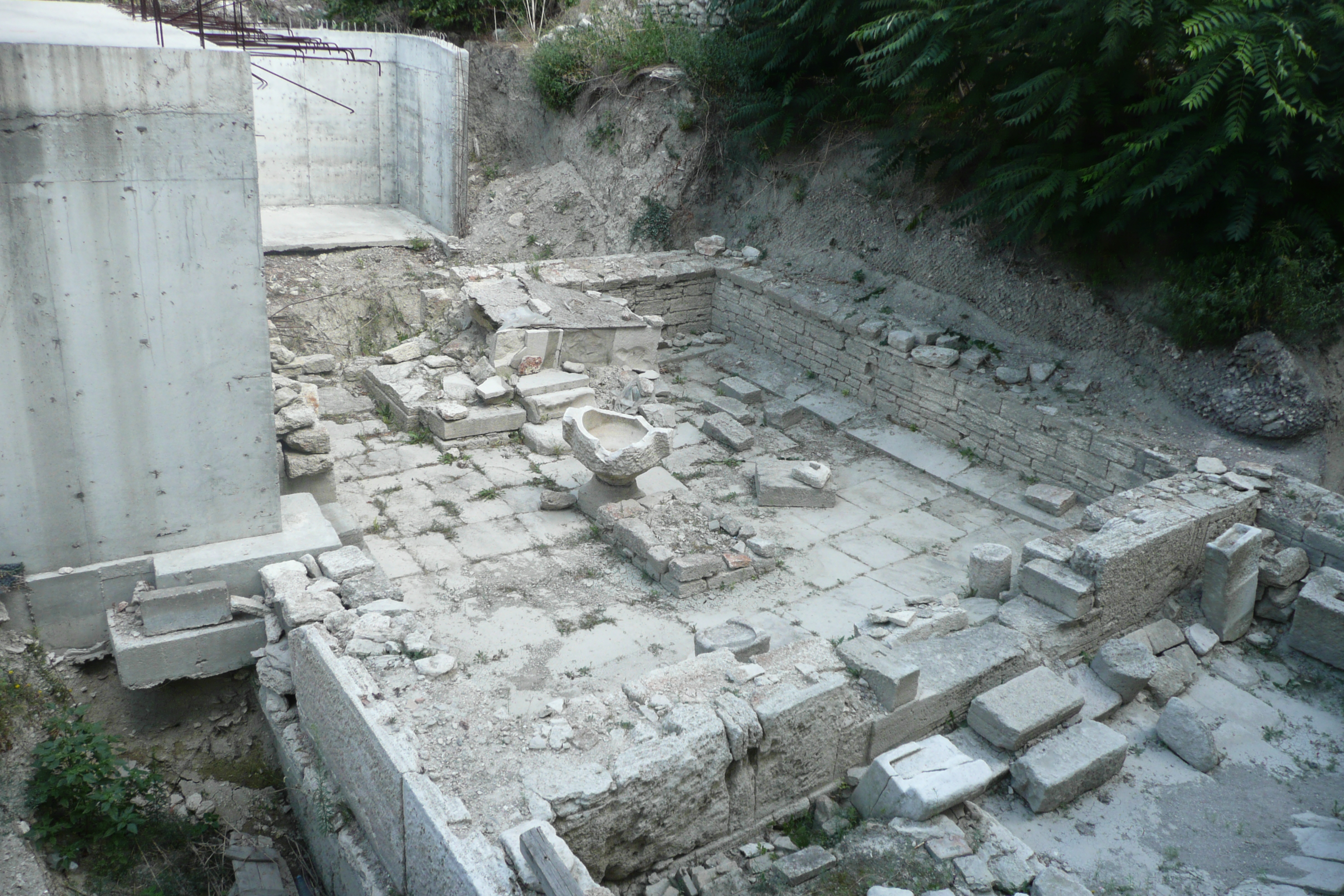
Complete view of the excavation site in Balchik in 2010

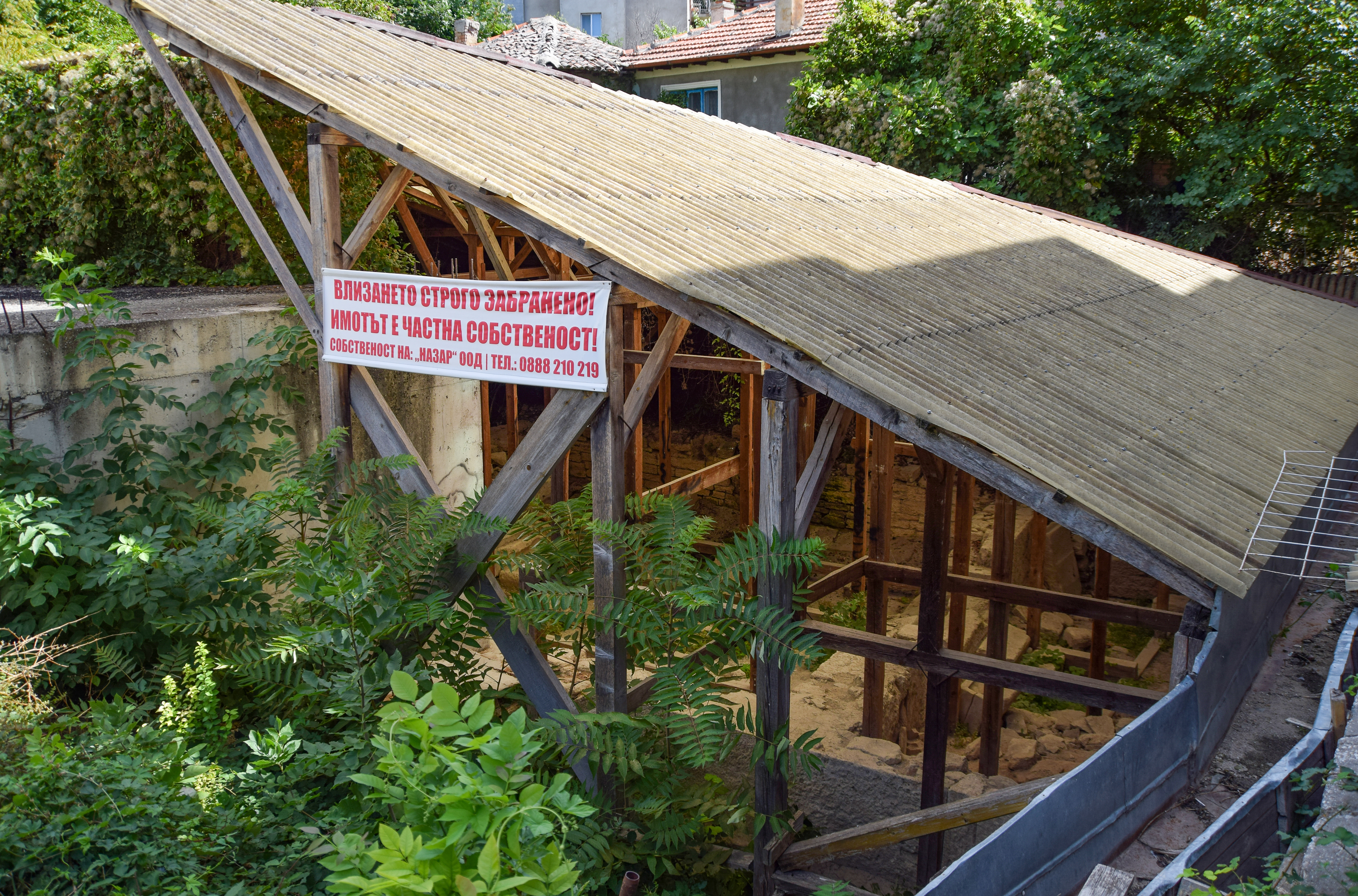
The excavation site in Balchik in 2025

The Temple of Cybele is a Hellenistic temple in Balchik, Bulgaria, which was discovered in 2007, during construction work on a new hotel.

The building has an area of 93.5 m^{2} (1,006 sq ft) and dates back to the period 280-260 BC. It was burnt down by the Goths during an invasion of the region in 378 AD and never restored. In 544-545 AD, it was buried as a result of a natural calamity, possibly a tsunami in the Black Sea.

The Balchik temple is the best preserved Hellenistic temple in Bulgaria, with findings being compared in significance to those of the ancient Pompeii complex, because Cybele is the only known Phrygian deity, the patron saint of Ancient Rome, under whose care his centuries-old battle with Carthage was won. Alexander the Great was trying to build a monotheistic cult around Cybele, and theologians believe that it is this pagan goddess who belongs to the image of the Mary, mother of Jesus.

It is considered to be one of the most significant anthropological archaeological finds in Bulgaria, comparable to the nearby Varna necropolis where the oldest gold artifact was discovered. The majority of the statues and other artifacts from the temple form part of the collection at the Balchik Museum of History. The temple itself remains inaccessible to visitors as it is located on private property.

== See also ==
- Dionysupolis
- Samothrace temple complex
- Ariadne's string
- Aeneas
- Salammbô
- Carthago delenda est
- Varna Monastery
- Ravna Monastery
- Chernorizets Hrabar
