= Balchik Palace =

- Дворец в Балчик
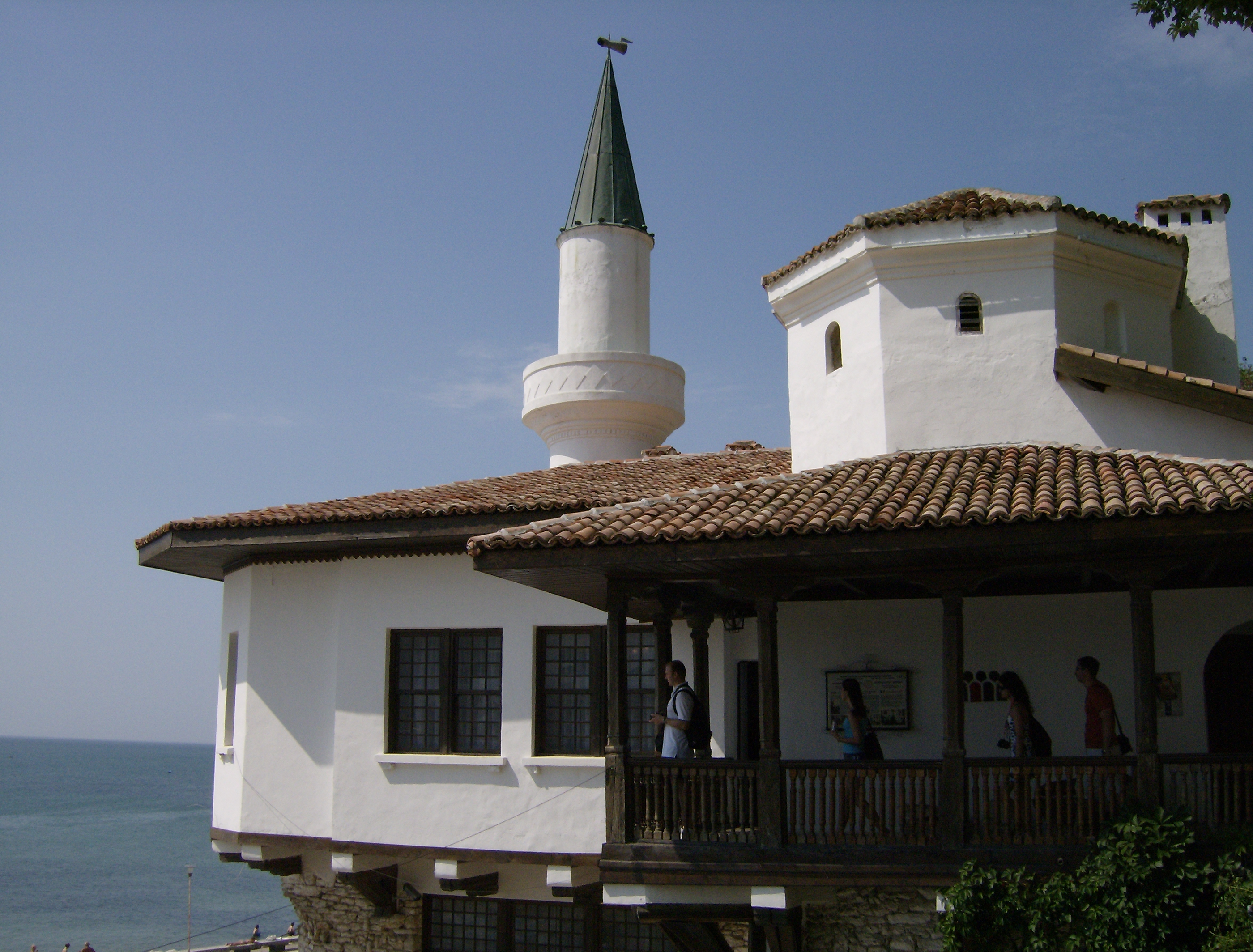

- Location within Bulgaria

General information
- Location: Balchik, Bulgaria
- Coordinates: 43°24′16″N 28°8′49″E
- Construction started: 1926
- Construction stopped: 1937

Design and construction
- Architects: Amerigo and Augustino

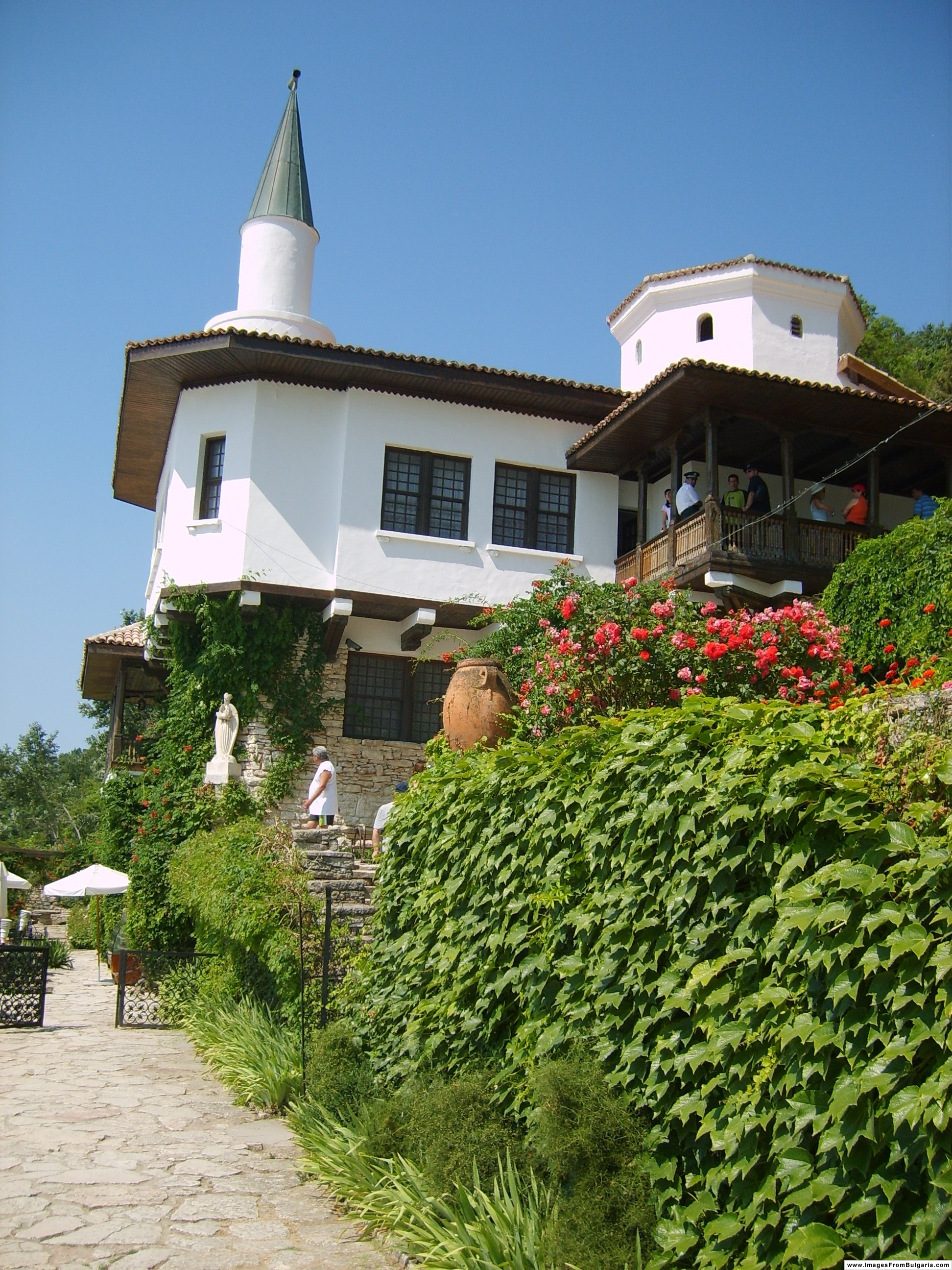
The queen's summer residence with the extravagant minaret

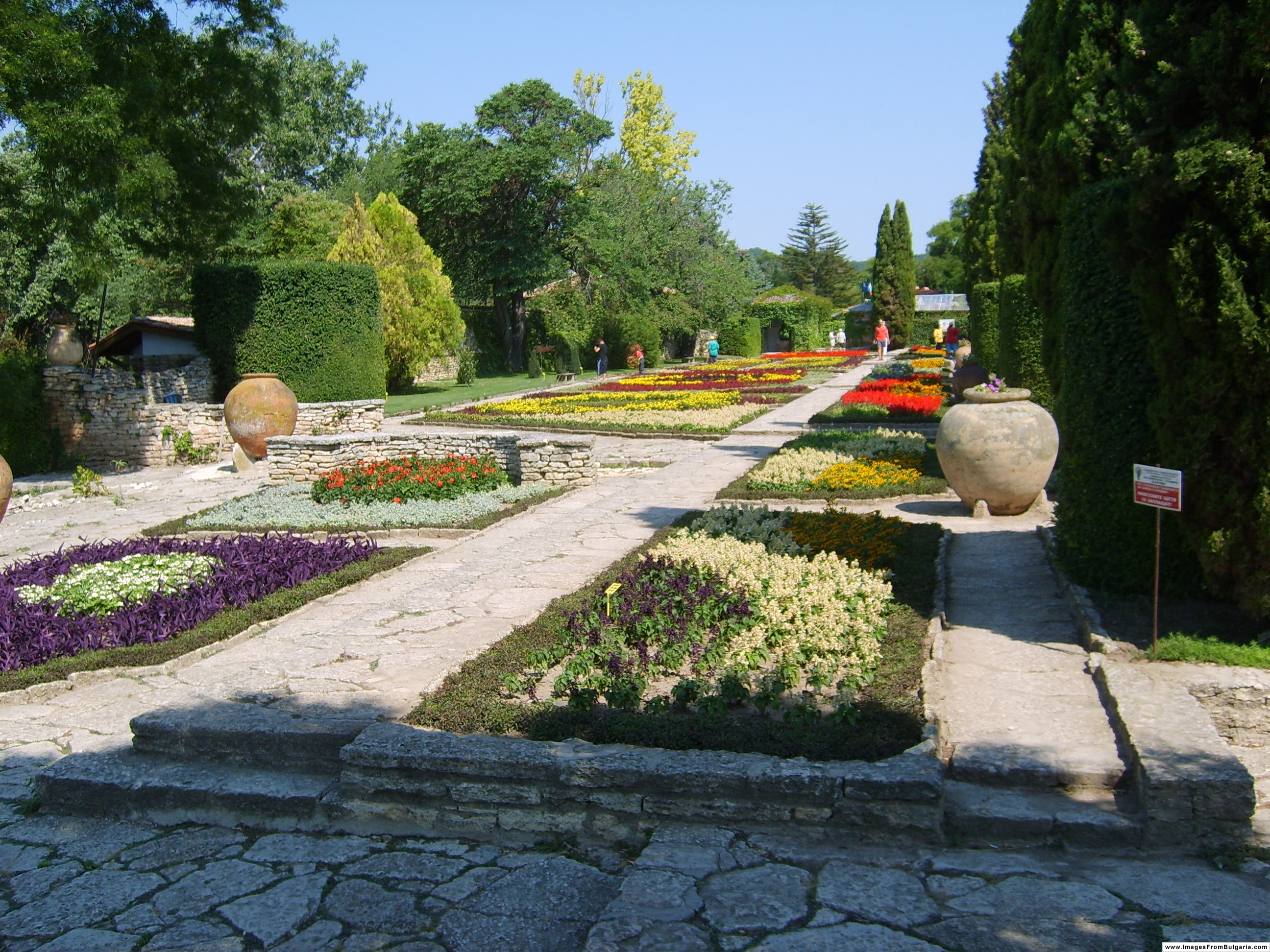
The botanical garden

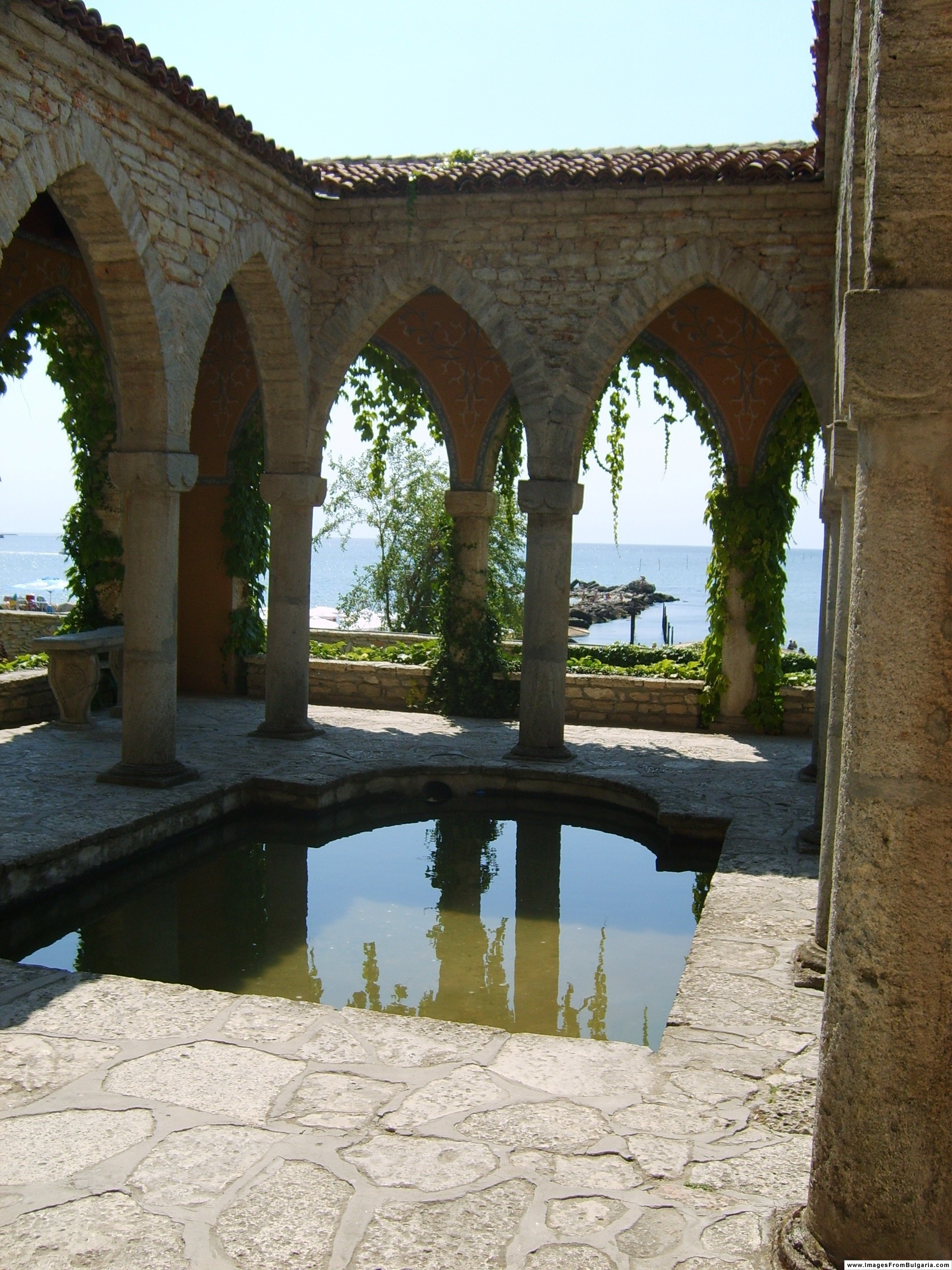
The baths

The Balchik Palace is a small palace and former royal residence located in Balchik, a popular town and seaside resort in Dobrich Province, in northeastern Bulgaria. Known as the Quiet Nest, the palace was built to serve as the summer residence of Queen Marie, in a time the region was part of Romania.

Construction started around 1924, escalating in 1926 and officially ending in 1937. Its architectural style is mostly combining Bulgarian, Romanian and Ottoman Turkish motifs. The complex around it consists of villas, a smoking hall, a wine cellar, a monastery with a holy spring and chapel, as well as other buildings and a botanical garden.

The palace remains a popular touristic attraction of the Bulgarian coast, despite controversies over its origin.

== History ==
The Dobrich Province was part of Bulgaria since 1878, when the country became an autonomous principality after the Congress of Berlin 1878. However, in 1913, it was taken over by Romania in the aftermath of the Second Balkan War, which Bulgaria lost, thus placing Balchik ten kilometers north of the new border between the two kingdoms, in the Caliacra County.

In 1921, Queen Marie visited Balchik and instantly developed a strong affinity for the area, saying that she "couldn't imagine such a place only in places like Italy". Romanian noble families were already having summer residences in the area, giving even more reason for a royal residence to be built. Construction began three years later and the complex was completely finished in 1937, the year Queen Marie passed away. Over time, she spent most of her time in the Quiet Nest, the palace proper, which was the first building to be built.

In 1940, the region was ceded back to Bulgaria as a result of the Craiova Treaty, Romania technically still retaining its rights over it by continuing paying taxes for it until 1948. The building became an official property of the Bulgarian state in 1970, when Bulgaria and Romania signed a final agreement regarding the legal status of the palace. Ever since, it was under the full jurisdiction of the Ministry of Culture of Bulgaria.

== Architectural complex and botanical garden ==
Balkan and Ottoman Turkish motifs were used in the construction of the palace that was carried out by Italian architects Augustino and Americo, while a florist was hired from Switzerland to arrange the park. The main building's extravagant minaret coexists with a Christian chapel, perfectly illustrating the queen's Baháʼí Faith beliefs.

Today, many of the former royal villas and other buildings of the complex are reorganized inside and used to accommodate tourists. Some of the older Bulgarian water mills have also been preserved and reconstructed as restaurants or tourist villas.

In 1940, after the reincorporation of Southern Dobruja in Bulgaria with the Treaty of Craiova, the Balchik Botanical Garden was established at the place of the palace's park. It has an area of 65,000 square metres (700,000 ft^{2}) and accommodates 2000 plant species belonging to 85 families and 200 genera. One of the garden's main attractions is the collection of large-sized cactus species arranged outdoors on 1,000 square metres (11,000 ft^{2}), the second of its kind in Europe after the one in Monaco. Other notable species include the Metasequoia, the Para rubber tree and the Ginkgo.

Francis Ford Coppola spent 11 days at the palace shooting scenes of Youth Without Youth.

== Controversies ==
Various Bulgarian nationalist intellectuals and public figures have expressed concerns that the palace is becoming a propaganda showcase for the Romanian administration of Southern Dobruja, giving the impression that Southern Dobruja was always Romanian land, thus justifying territorial claims against Bulgaria. Thus, they suggest that the Balchik Palace should be less important in promoting tourism in Bulgaria. A similar position was taken by the Balchik History Museum in 2025, which claimed that the Balchik Castle and Queen Maria of Romania are symbols of a "brutal, foreign occupation of Bulgarian lands".
