= Kladenets =

Kladenets may refer to:

- Kladenets, Haskovo Province, a village in southern Bulgaria
- Kladenets, Shumen Province, a village in Shumen Municipality, northeastern Bulgaria
- Sword Kladenets, a magic sword in traditional Russian fairy tales
