= Kladenets, Haskovo Province =

Coordinates: 41°44′N 25°40′E

- Village
- Interactive map of Kladenets, Haskovo Province
- Country: Bulgaria
- Province: Haskovo Province
- Municipality: Stambolovo
- Time zone: UTC+2 (EET)
  - Summer (DST): UTC+3 (EEST)

Kladenets is a village in Stambolovo Municipality, in the Haskovo Province, in southern Bulgaria.
