= Varosha =

Varosha may refer to:

== Places ==
=== Cyprus ===
- Varosha, Famagusta, quarter in Famagusta, Cyprus

=== Bulgaria ===
- Varosha, quarter in Blagoevgrad
- Varosha, quarter in Razgrad
- Varosha, quarter in Lovech
  - Varosha architectural complex in Lovech
