= Dzherman =

Dzherman may refer to:

- Dzherman (river), a river in south-western Bulgaria
- Dzherman, Kyustendil Province, a village in Dupnitsa Municipality, south-western Bulgaria

== See also ==
- German (disambiguation)
