= Hasköy =

Hasköy may refer to the following places in Turkey:

- Hasköy, Istanbul, a quarter or neighborhood of the district of Beyoğlu in Istanbul
- Hasköy, Ardahan, a village in the district of Ardahan, Ardahan Province
- Hasköy, Çınar
- Hasköy, Enez
- Hasköy, Havsa
- Hasköy, Kahta, a village in the district of Kahta, Adıyaman Province
- Hasköy, Muş, a town and district of Muş Province
- Hasköy, Nazilli, a village in the district of Nazilli, Aydın Province
- Hasköy, Sarayköy

Hasköy is also the Turkish name for Haskovo, when Bulgaria was under Ottoman rule
