= Nikyup =

- Village
- Nikyup
- Location within Bulgaria
- Coordinates: 43.25°N 25.5833°E
- Country: Bulgaria
- Province (Oblast): Veliko Tarnovo

Area
  - Total: 19,433 km^{2} (7,503 sq mi)
- Time zone: UTC+2 (EEST)
  - Summer (DST): UTC+3
- Postal code: 5068

Nikyup is a village in Northern Bulgaria, in Veliko Tarnovo Province (Oblast Veliko Tarnovo), 194 km east of Sofia, Bulgaria's capital. The closest airport is in Gorna Oryahovitsa, 15 kilometers southeast.

== Geography ==
Nikyup is situated on the Rositsa river in the central part of the Danubian plain. The city of Veliko Tarnovo is 17 kilometres (11 mi) to the south.

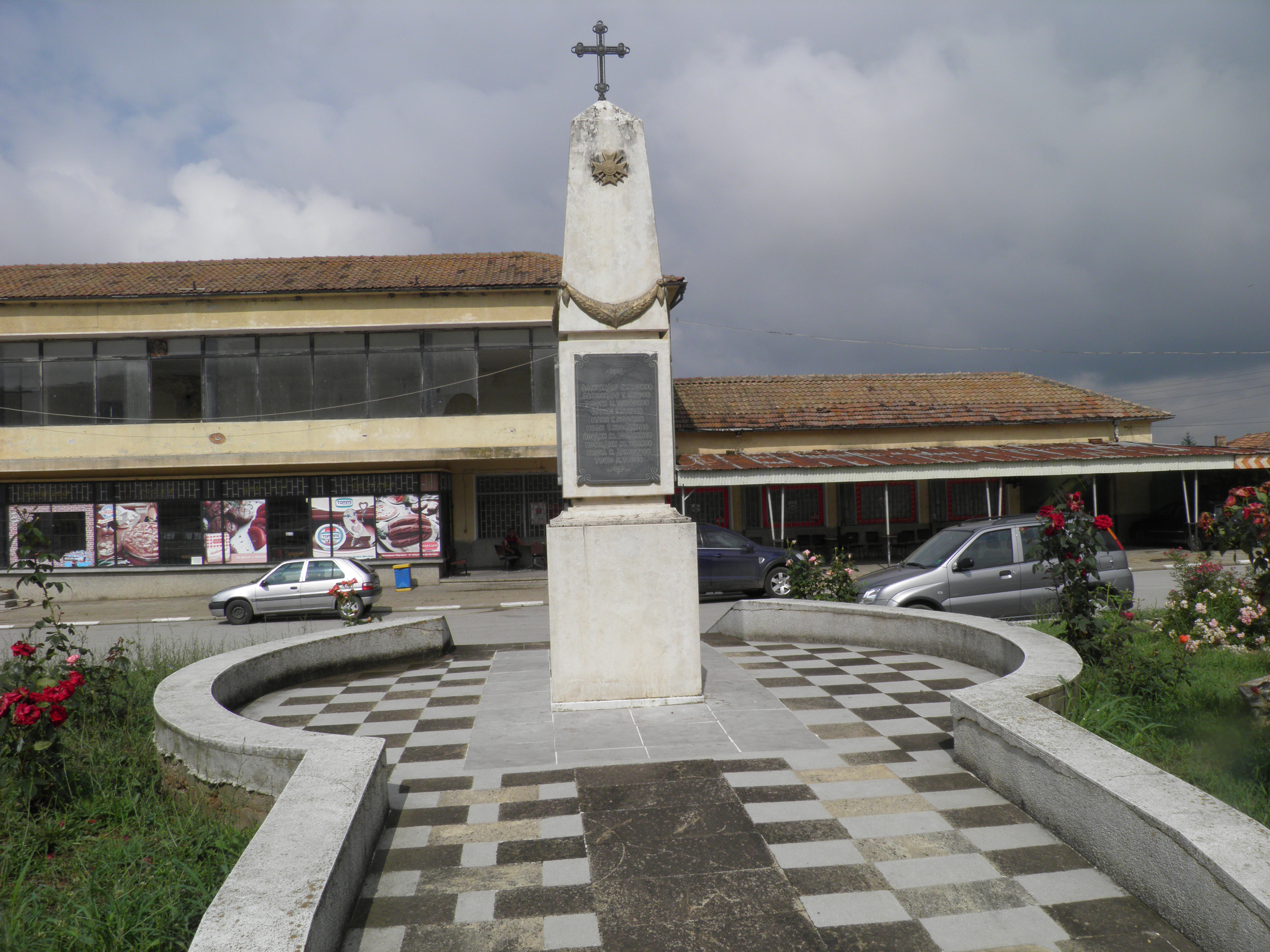
War memorial

== History ==
The remains of Nicopolis ad Istrum, an ancient Roman city, are 3 kilometres (1.9 mi) to the south. The Nikyup Museum has Roman archeological remains including pillars, sarcophagi, and remains of marble edifices.

The first dating written text about the village is estimated to come from the 15th century. It is believed that the village was established in 1879.

A statue in the village center of commemorates the fallen warriors of Nikyup in numerous wars.

== Population ==
Nikyup
Year	1887	1910	1934	1946	1956	1965	1975	1985	1992	2001	2005	2009	2011	2021
Population	??	??	1776	1813	1689	1424	1044	805	669	519	??	??	365	??
	Highest number ?? in ??													
Sources: National Statistical Institute, citypopulation.de, pop-stat.mashke.org,?? Bulgarian Academy of Sciences??

Ethnic groups count in 2011:

	Number	Percentage (in %)
Total	365	100.00
Bulgarians	307	84.10
Turks	25	6.84
Gypsies	0	0.00
Others	7	1.91
Do not identify as any	1	0.27
Unanswered	25	6.84
