= Turgut Reis Mosque (Balchik) =

Mosque in Balchik, Bulgaria

- Тургут Реис джамия
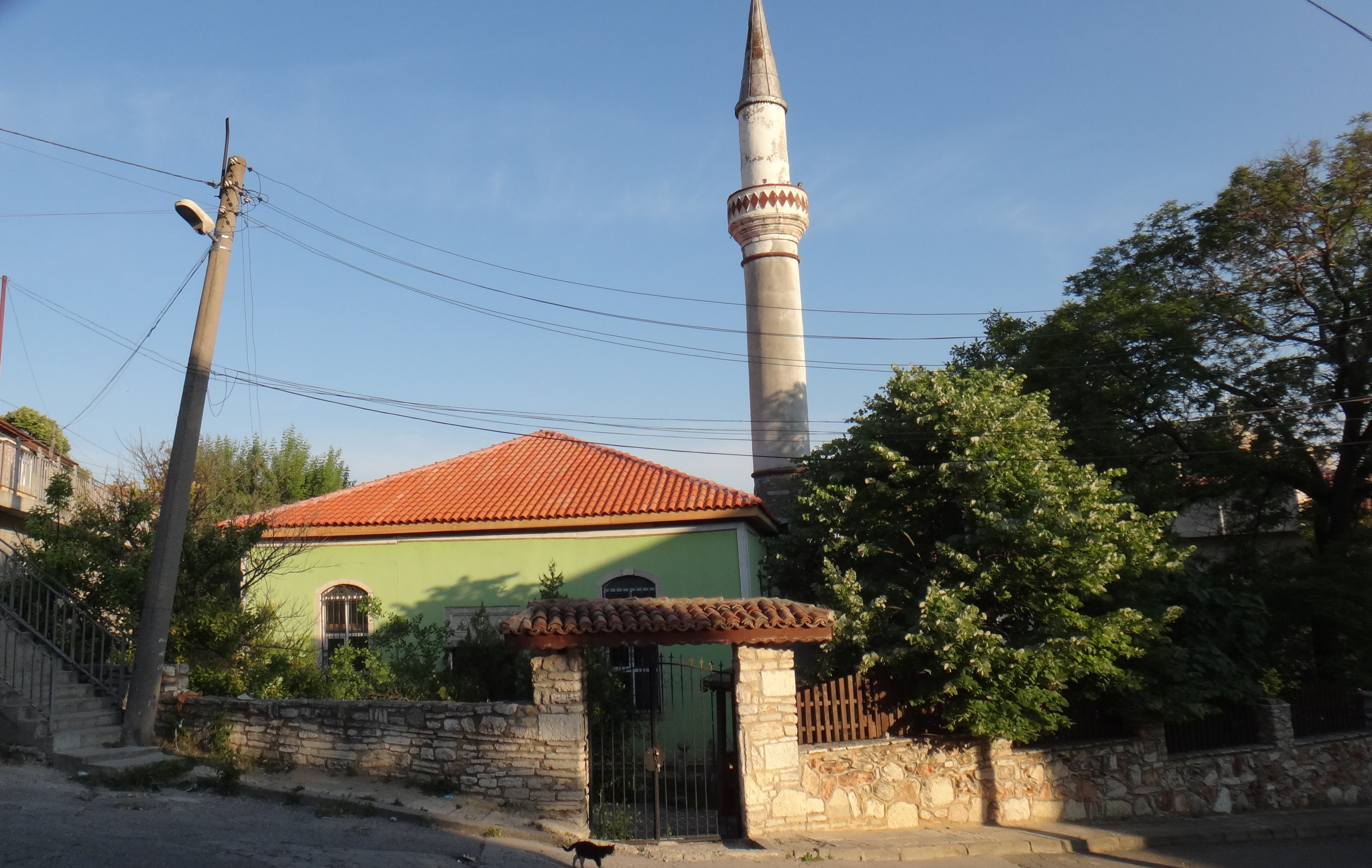

- Location within Bulgaria

Religion
- Affiliation: Islam

Location
- Location: Balchik, Dobrich Province
- Country: Bulgaria
- Interactive map of Turgut Reis Mosque
- Coordinates: 43°24′20″N 28°10′7″E

Architecture
- Type: mosque
- Minaret: 1

Turgut Reis Mosque (Bulgarian: Тургут Реис джамия, Turkish: Turgut Reis Camii or Karagöl Camii) is a mosque in Balchik, in the Dobrich Province of Bulgaria.

== Overview ==
Dragut (Turgut Reis) was caught in a strong storm in the Black Sea and prayed, saying that he will build a mosque when he gets rid of this storm. And he reached the town of Balchik and did build the Turgut Reis Mosque.

== Gallery ==
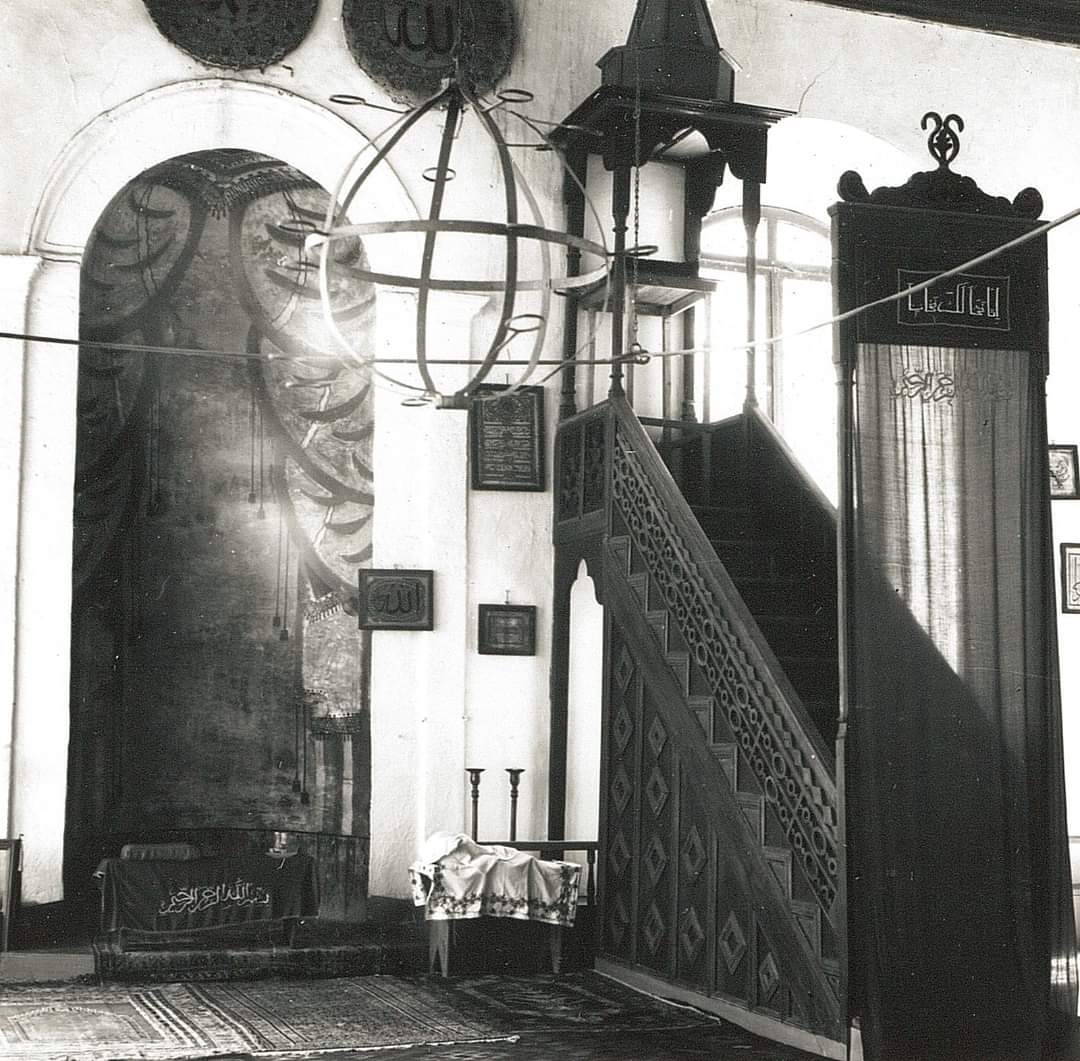
The mosque in 1939

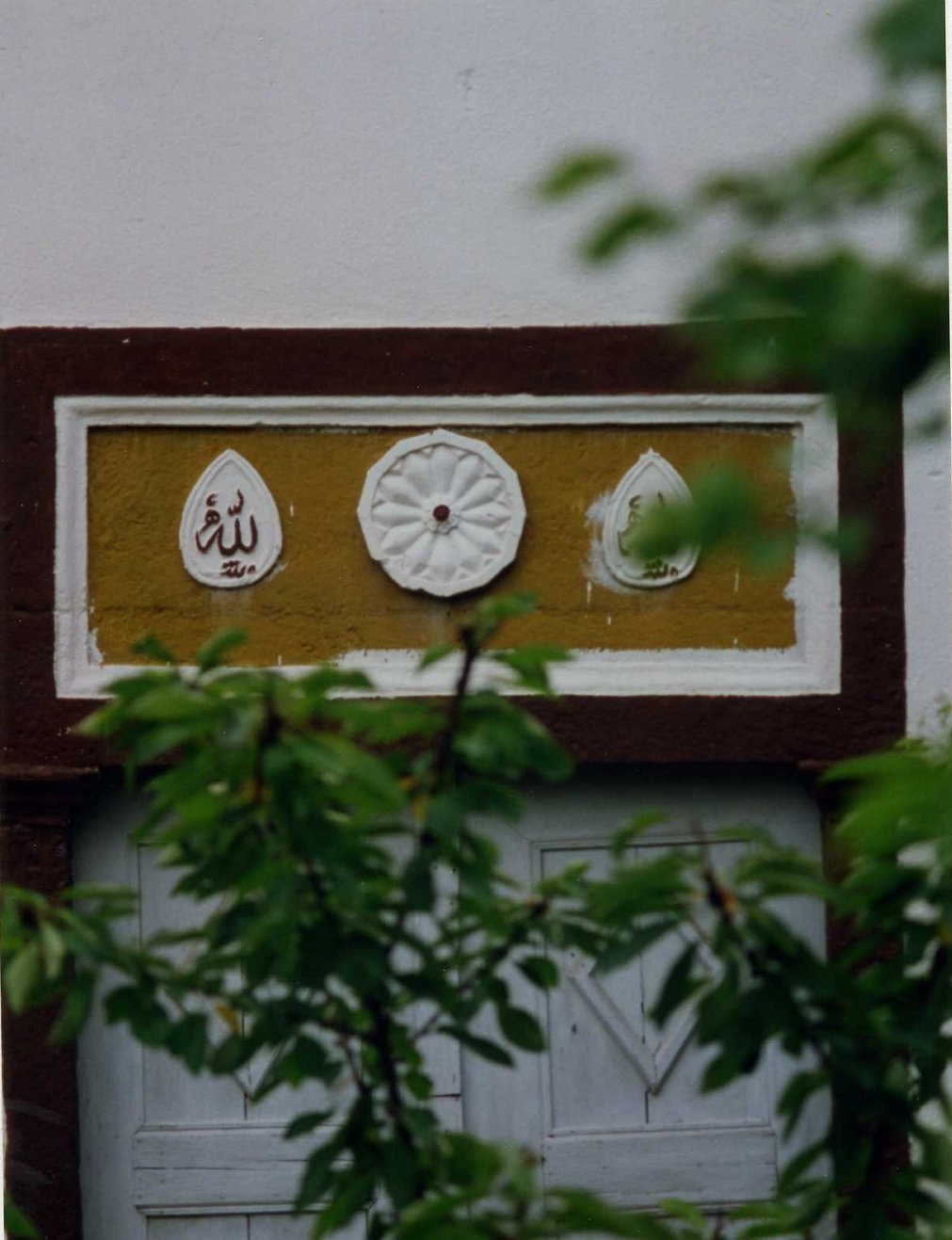
The mosque in 1993

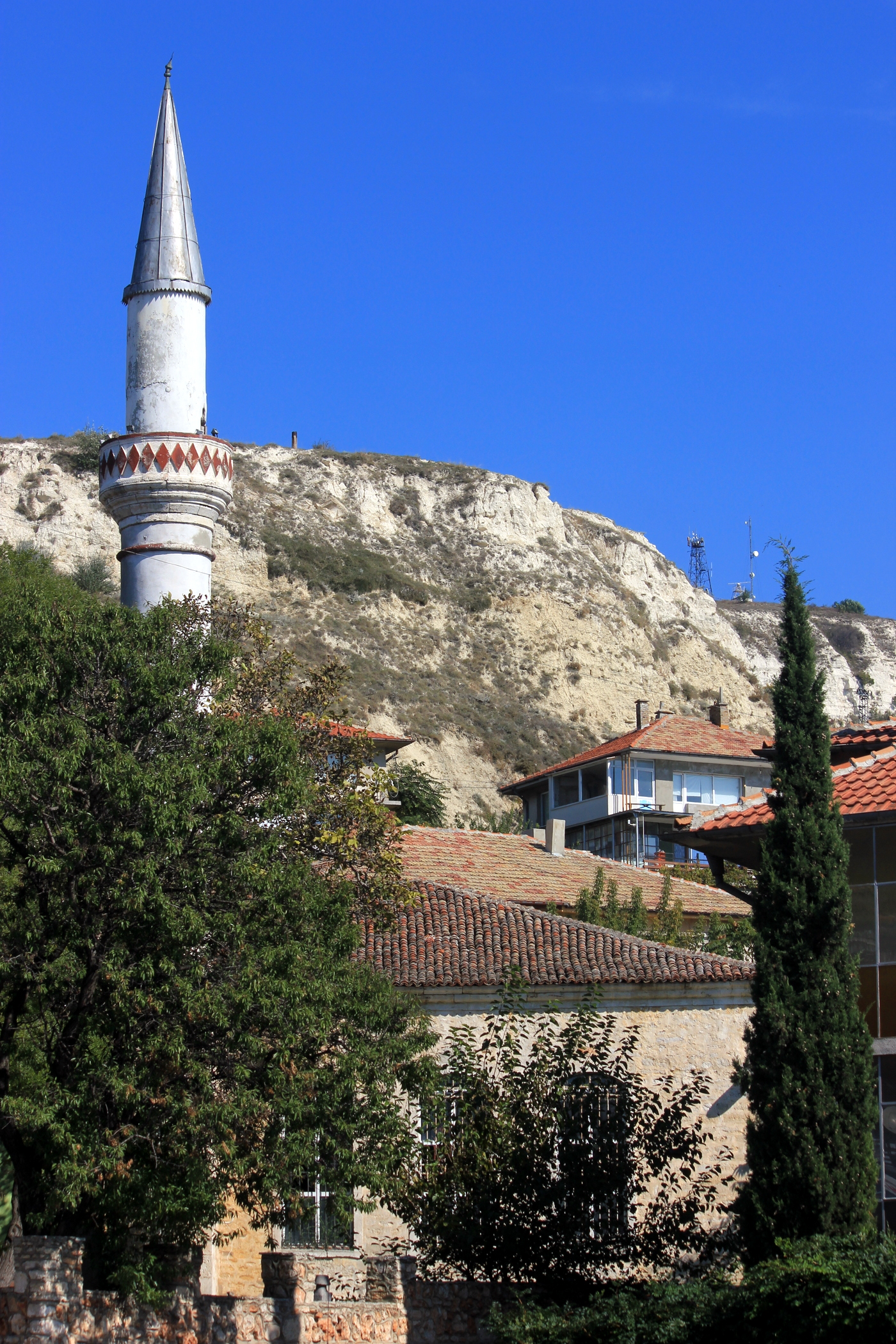

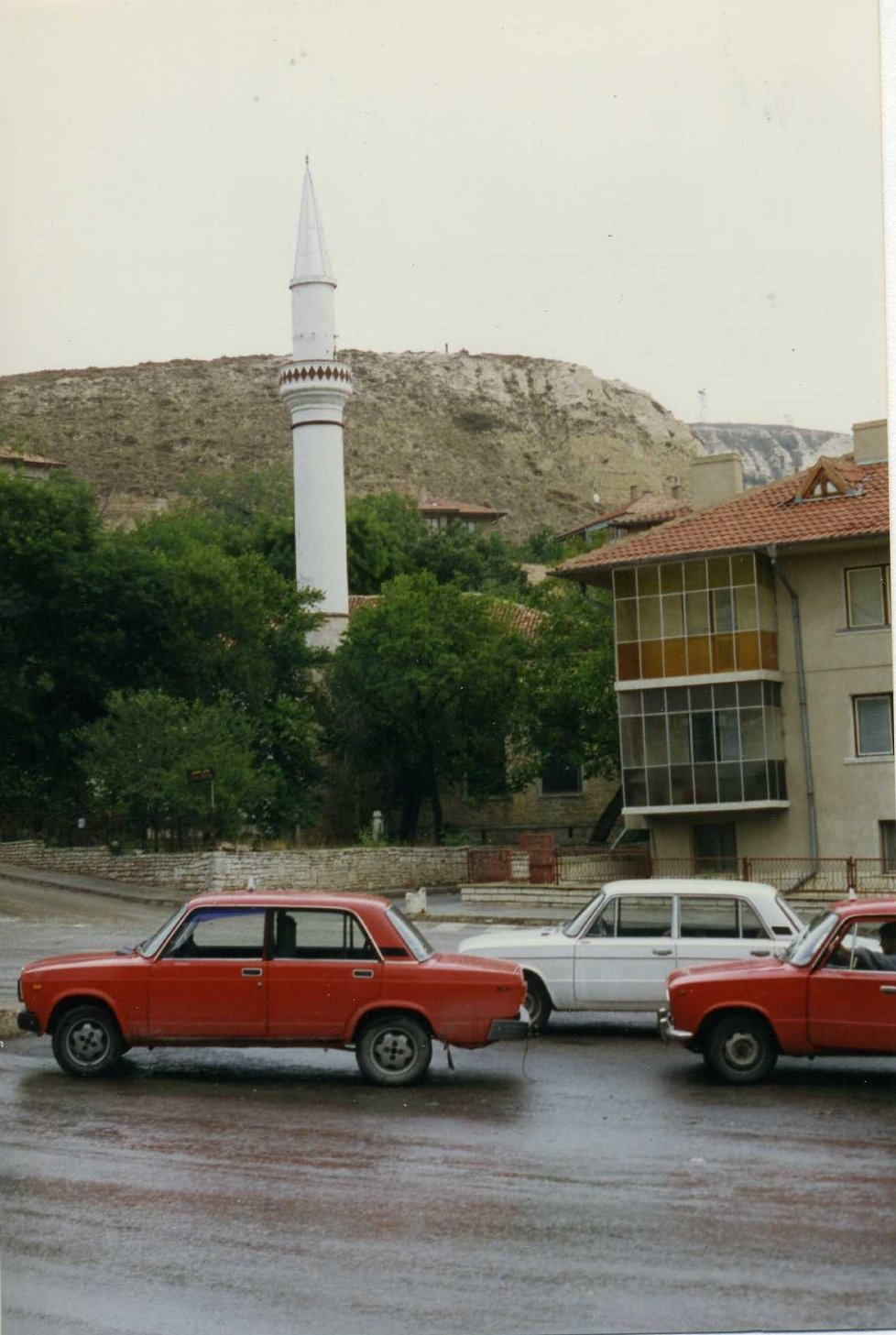
The mosque in 1993

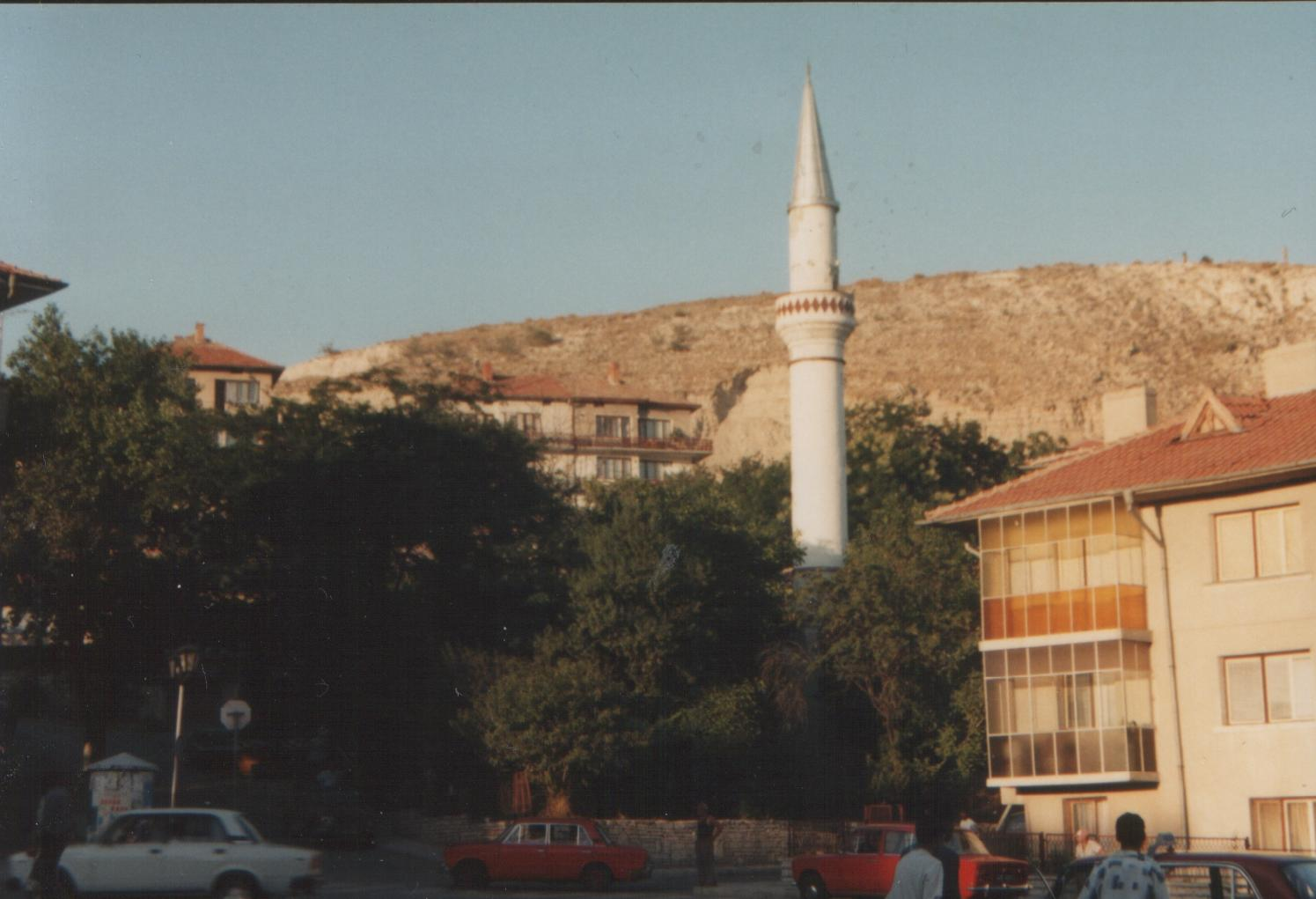
The mosque in 1995

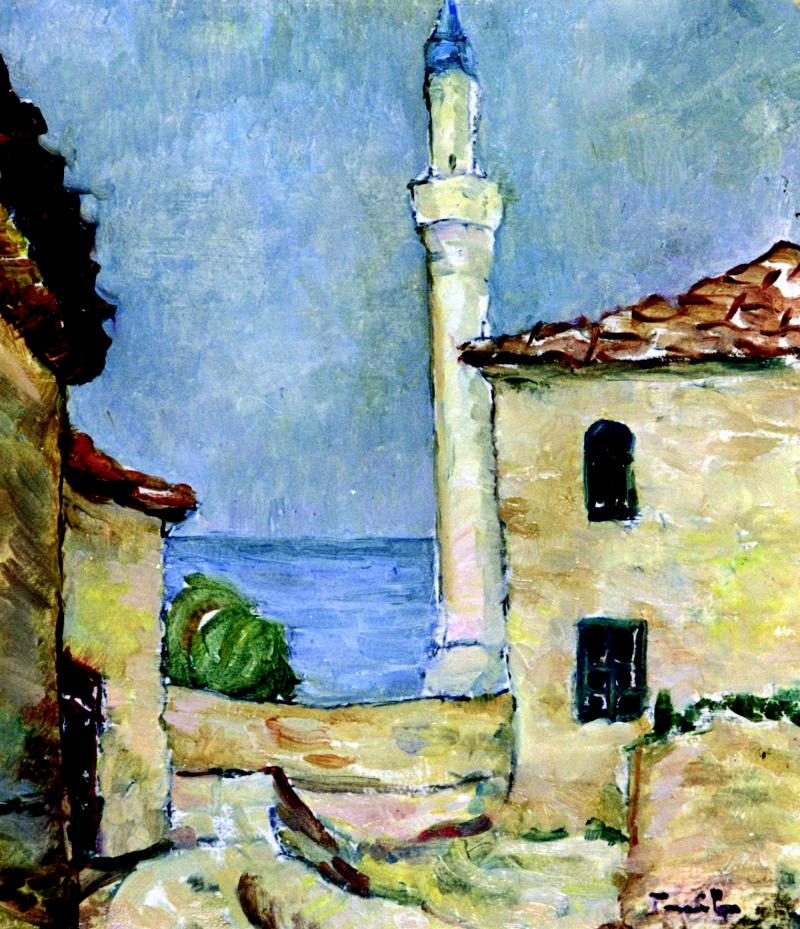
Art from Nicolae Tonitza

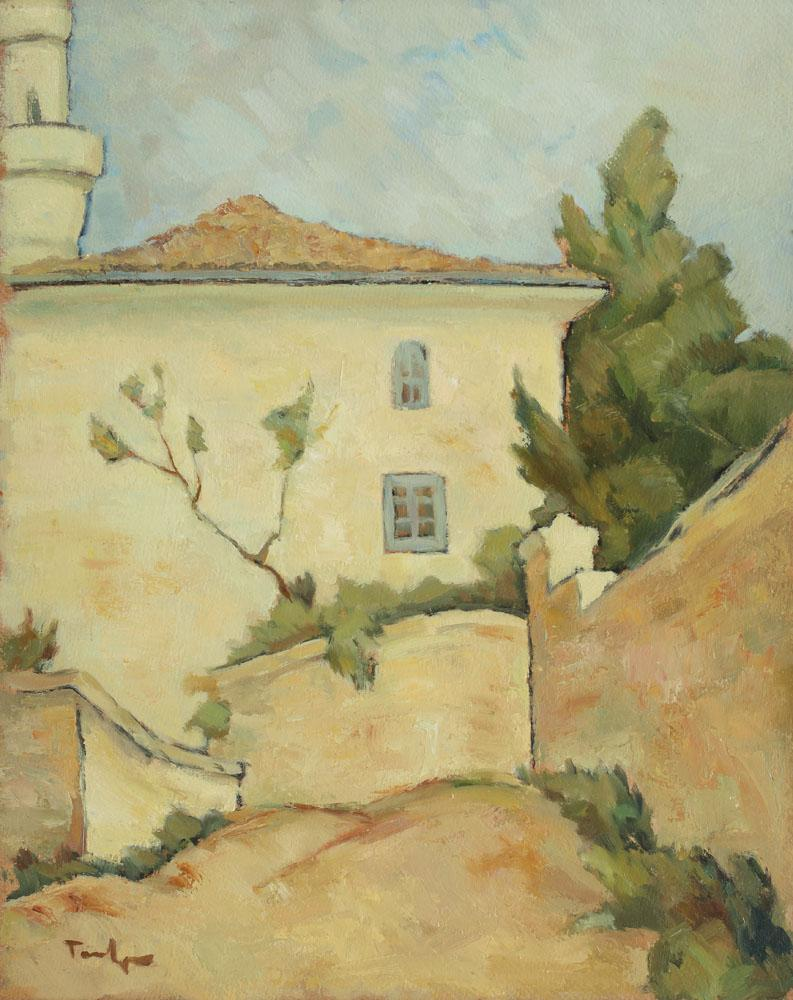
Art from Nicolae Tonitza

== See also ==
- Islam in Bulgaria
- List of mosques in Bulgaria
