= Balchik =

Balchik Балчик
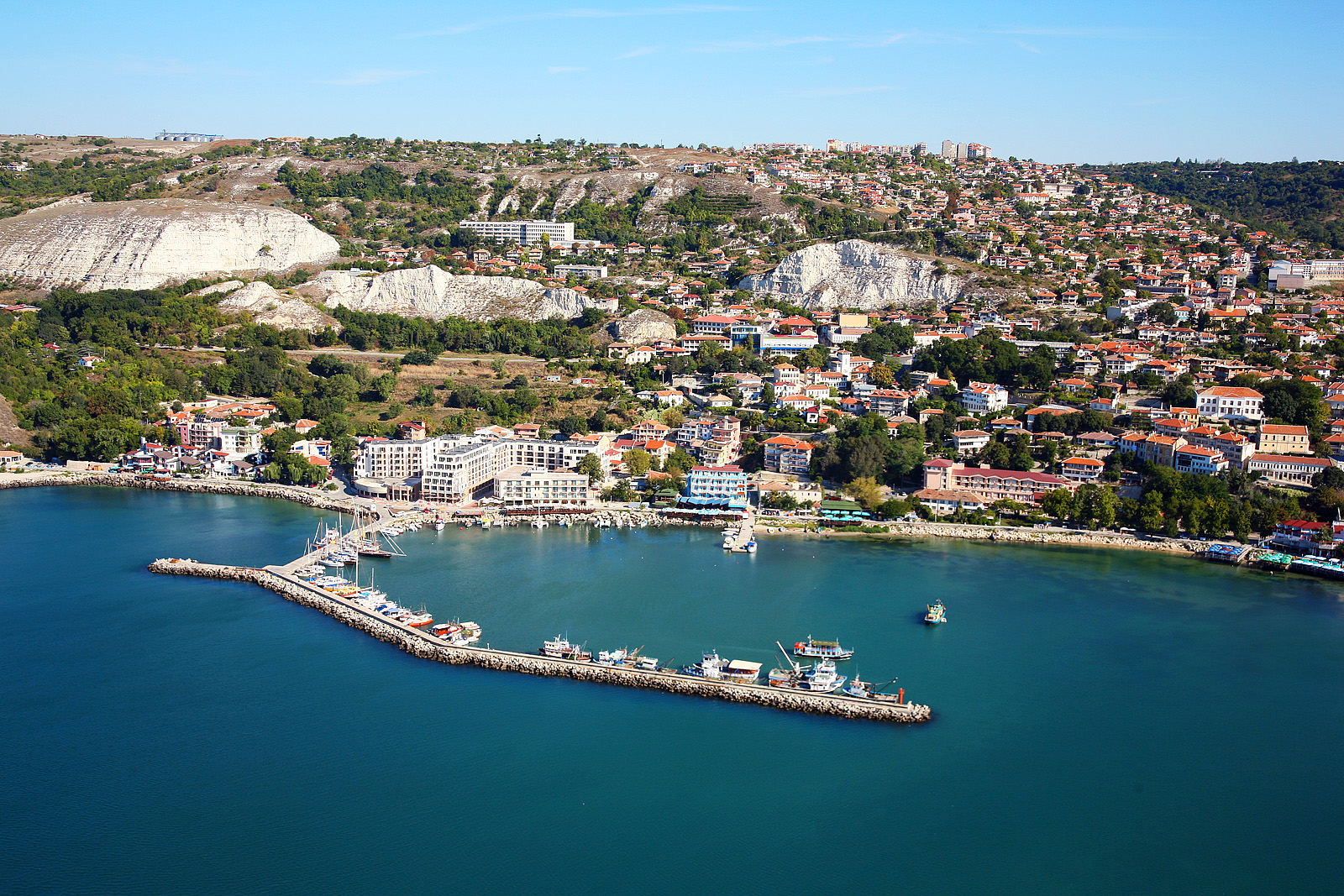
- Aerial overview of Balchik

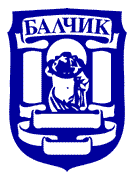
- Coat of arms

- Location of Balchik
- Coordinates: 43°25′37″N 28°09′42″E
- Country: Bulgaria
- Province (Oblast): Dobrich

Government
  - Mayor: Nikolay Angelov
- Elevation: 199 m (653 ft)

Population (2018-12-31)
  - Town: 11,052
  - Municipality: 19,331
- Time zone: UTC+2 (EET)
  - Summer (DST): UTC+3 (EEST)
- Postal Code: 9600
- Area code: 0579

Balchik (Bulgarian: Балчик Bulgarian pronunciation: [bɐɫˈt͡ʃik]; Romanian: Balcic, Turkish: Balçık) is a town and seaside resort on the Bulgarian Black Sea Coast in the Southern Dobruja area of northeastern Bulgaria. It is in Dobrich Province, 35 km southeast of Dobrich and 42 km northeast of Varna. It sprawls scenically along hilly terraces descending from the Dobruja plateau to the sea, and is often called "The White City" because of its white cliffs.

== Etymology ==
Under the Ottoman Empire, the town came to be known with its present name, which perhaps derived from a Gagauz word meaning "small town".

Another theory suggests that it is named after the medieval ruler Balik, brother of Dobrotitsa, after whom the city of Dobrich is named.

== History ==
=== Antiquity: Thracians and Greeks ===
Founded as a Thracian settlement, it was later colonised by the ancient Greek Ionians with the name Krounoi (Ancient Greek: Κρουνοί), later renamed as Dionysopolis (Ancient Greek: Διονυσόπολις) after the discovery of a statue of Dionysus in the sea.

=== Early Middle Ages: Byzantines and Bulgarians ===
Later it became a Greek-Byzantine and Bulgarian fortress.

Karvuna is the old Bulgarian name of the ancient Dionysopol. The external resemblance to the name of the modern town of Kavarna is an occasion for some local historians to identify Karvuna with Kavarna, but the archaeological and historical data are not in favour of this proposal. Karvuna was the capital of the Karvuna region, also called Dobrudja in the Middle Ages until the arrival of the Ottoman Turks. The remains of the castle of the boyars Balik and Dobrotitsa were found above the city hospital of Balchik in the "Horizon" district (Gemidzhiya), but were almost erased by natural processes. In the Vasil Levski neighbourhood there are remains of the great fortress of Karvuna, built by the Byzantines and used by them and by the Bulgarians during the First Bulgarian Empire. Later, due to difficulties in defending the vast fortress located in the plain and the lack of a view of the sea, the Bulgarians built a fort of which only modest remains are preserved on the highest hill of the city, the Dzheni Bair or Ekhoto ('Echo') hill. The earthen rampart behind the ditch dates to the late 12th century, with various habitation-related findings from the 11th-15th centuries. The boyar Balik lived in the said castle opposite it on the hill above the present hospital, south of the great Kavarna fortress, which the centuries have now completely obliterated. Dobrotitsa (r. 1347–86), after ruling for some time here, moved the capital of the Despotate of Karvuna from Karvuna to Kaliakra.

=== Ottoman period ===
Under the Ottomans, the town came to be known by its present name.

=== Modern period ===
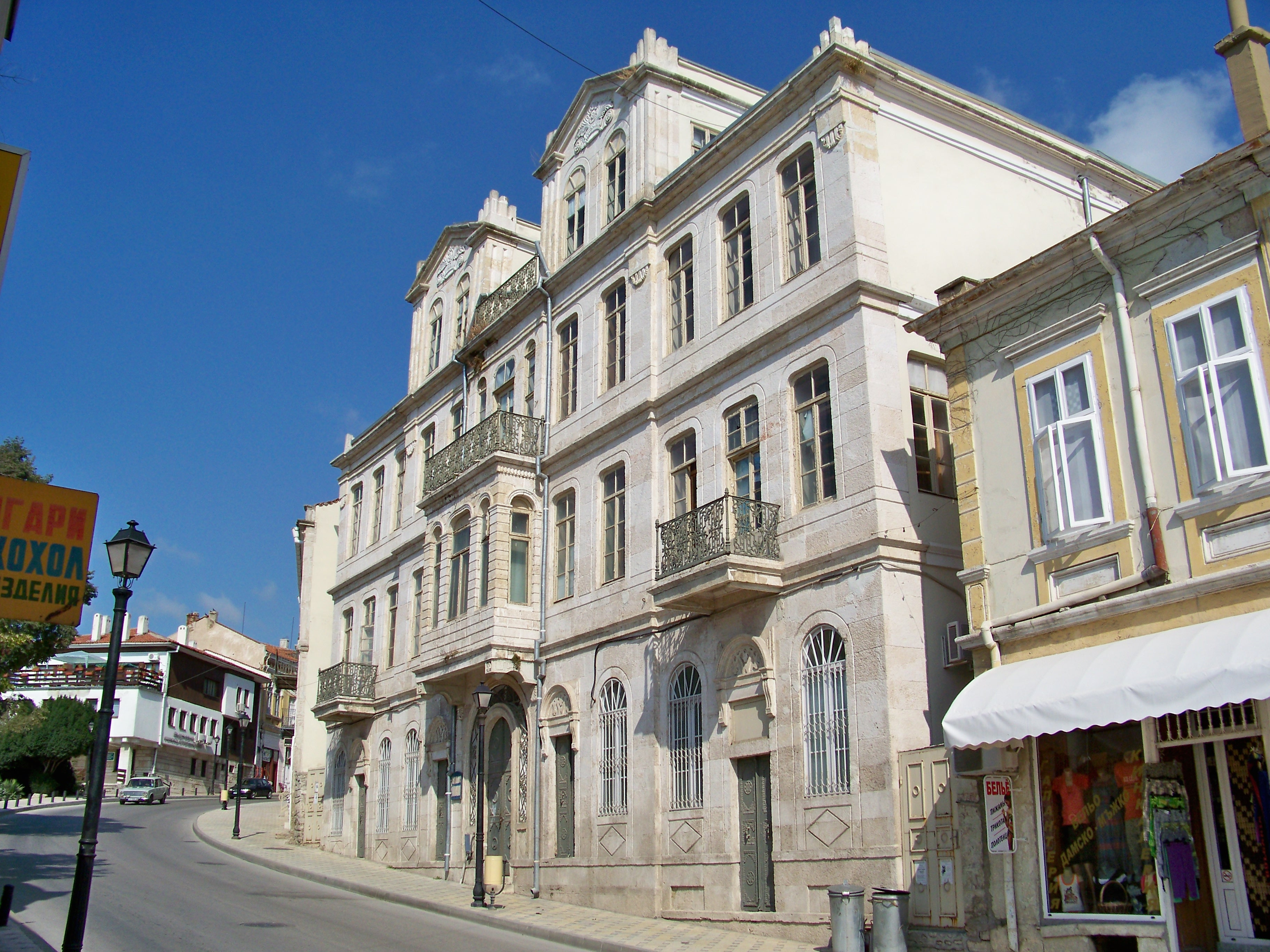
The Queen of Hearts building on Cherno More ('Black Sea') Street in the centre

==== Part of Bulgaria (1878-1913) ====
After the liberation of Bulgaria in 1878, Balchik developed as centre of a rich agricultural region, wheat-exporting port, and district (okoliya) town, and later, as a major tourist destination with the beachfront resort of Albena to its south.

==== Part of Romania (1913-1940) ====
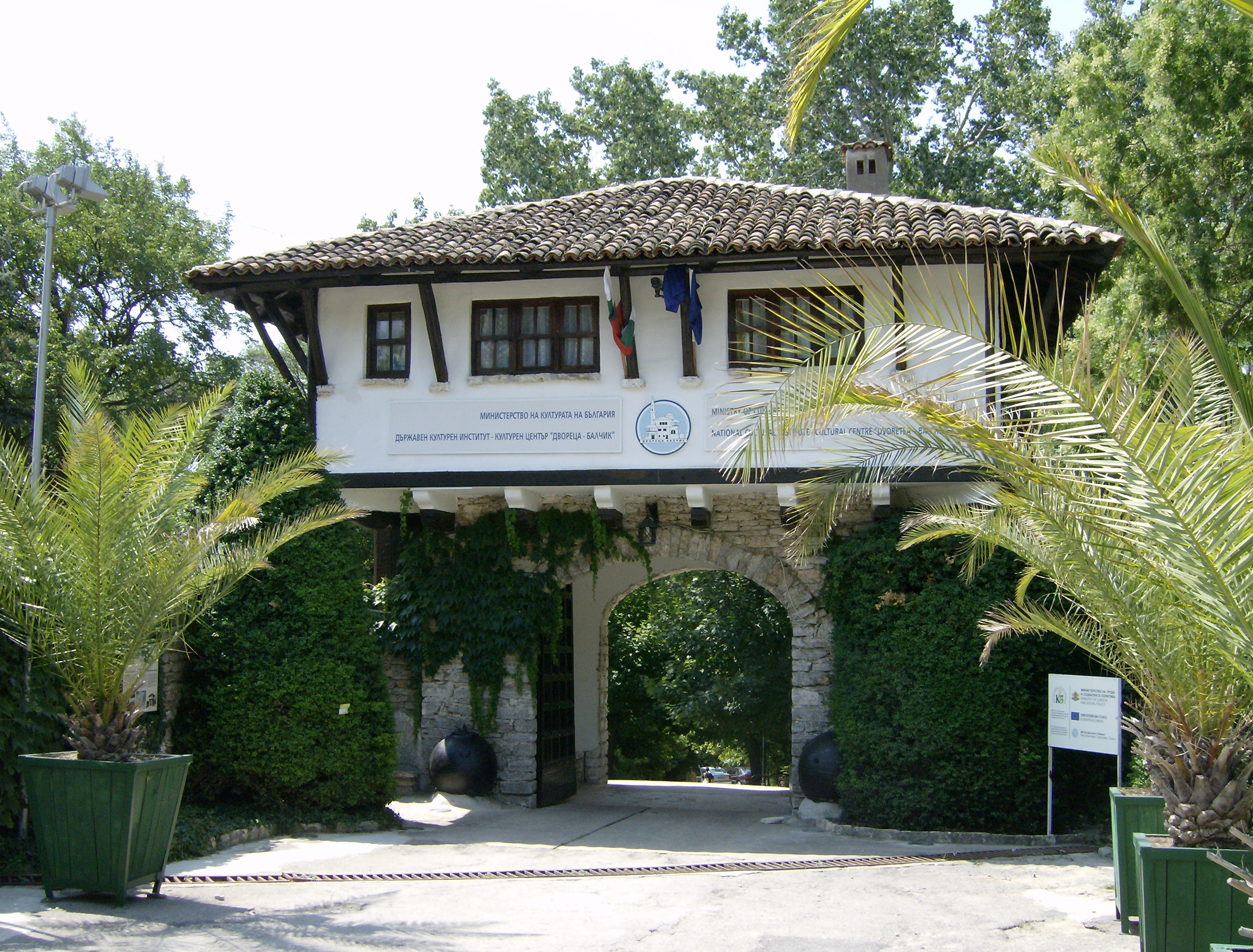
Queen Marie's 1925 "The Quiet Nest" palace, the gate flanked by sea mines

After the Second Balkan War, in 1913, the town became part of the Kingdom of Romania, with its name spelled Balcic. It was regained by Bulgaria during World War I (1916–1919), but Romanian rule was restored when hostilities in the region ceased.

During Romania's administration, the Balchik Palace was the favourite summer residence of Queen Marie of Romania and her immediate family. The town is the site of Marie's Oriental villa, the place where her heart was kept, in accordance with her last wishes, until 1940 (when the Treaty of Craiova awarded the region back to Bulgaria). It was then moved to Bran Castle, in central Romania. Today, the Balchik Palace and the adjacent Balchik Botanical Garden are the town's most popular landmarks and a popular tourist sightseeing destination.

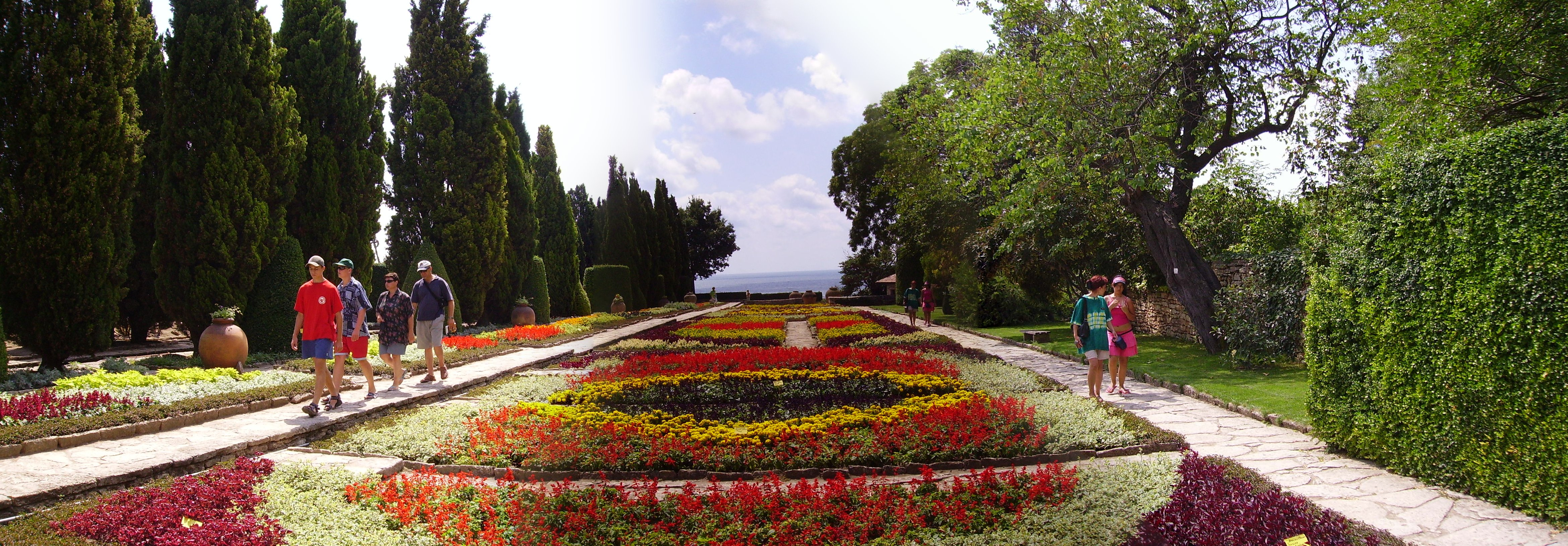
The Balchik Botanical Garden

During the inter-war period, Balchik was also a favorite destination for Romanian avant-garde painters, lending his name to an informal school of post-impressionist painters, the Balcic School of Painting, which is central in the development of Romanian 20th-century painting. Many works of the artists comprising the group depict the town's houses and the Turkish inhabitants, as well as the sea. Some seaside villas of the Romanian elite are preserved in Balchik, including Villa Storck (built in 1920–1926 by the artists Cecilia Cuțescu-Storck and Frederic Storck) and the adjacent modernist Villa Sanda (1934).

==== Back to Bulgaria (1940) ====
In 1940, just before the outbreak of World War II in the region and in the wider context of Bulgaria's interwar policy of returning the lost territories, the Great Powers' moves to secure Bulgarian support, and the earlier Second Vienna Award, Balchik was ceded back by Romania to Bulgaria by the terms of the Treaty of Craiova. This included an exchange of populations by ethnic groups.

== Population ==
The city's population was 11,051 people (data from National Statistics Institute - Bulgaria, 2018). The total population of Balchik municipality was 19,331.

According to an estimate by Bulgarian historian Rayna Gavrilova, the Bulgarian population before 1878 was only around 10%.

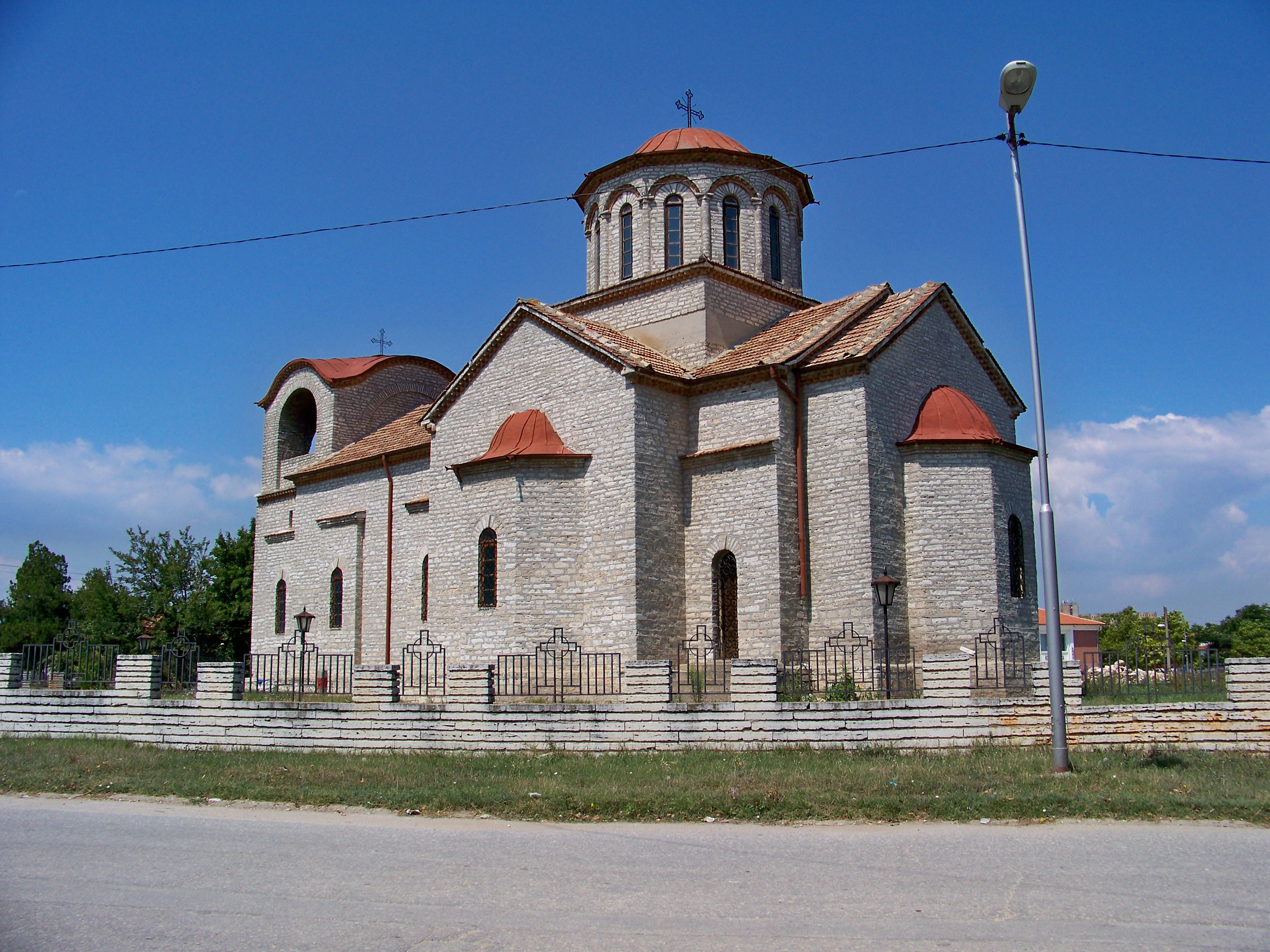
St Paraskeva (Sveta Petka Tarnovska) Eastern Orthodox church. Started by the Romanians in 1935 (architect Ștefan Balș), finished and inaugurated by the Bulgarians in 1954.

The ethnic composition has gradually changed from mostly Gagauz and Tatar/Turkish to predominantly Bulgarian. According to the latest (2011) census data, Balchik's ethnic composition is the following:

- Bulgarians: 7,916 (72.9%)
- Turks: 1,715 (15.8%)
- Gypsies: 954 (8.8%)
- Others: 191 (1.8%)
- Indefinable: 79 (0.7%)
- Undeclared: 755 (6.5%)

== Culture ==
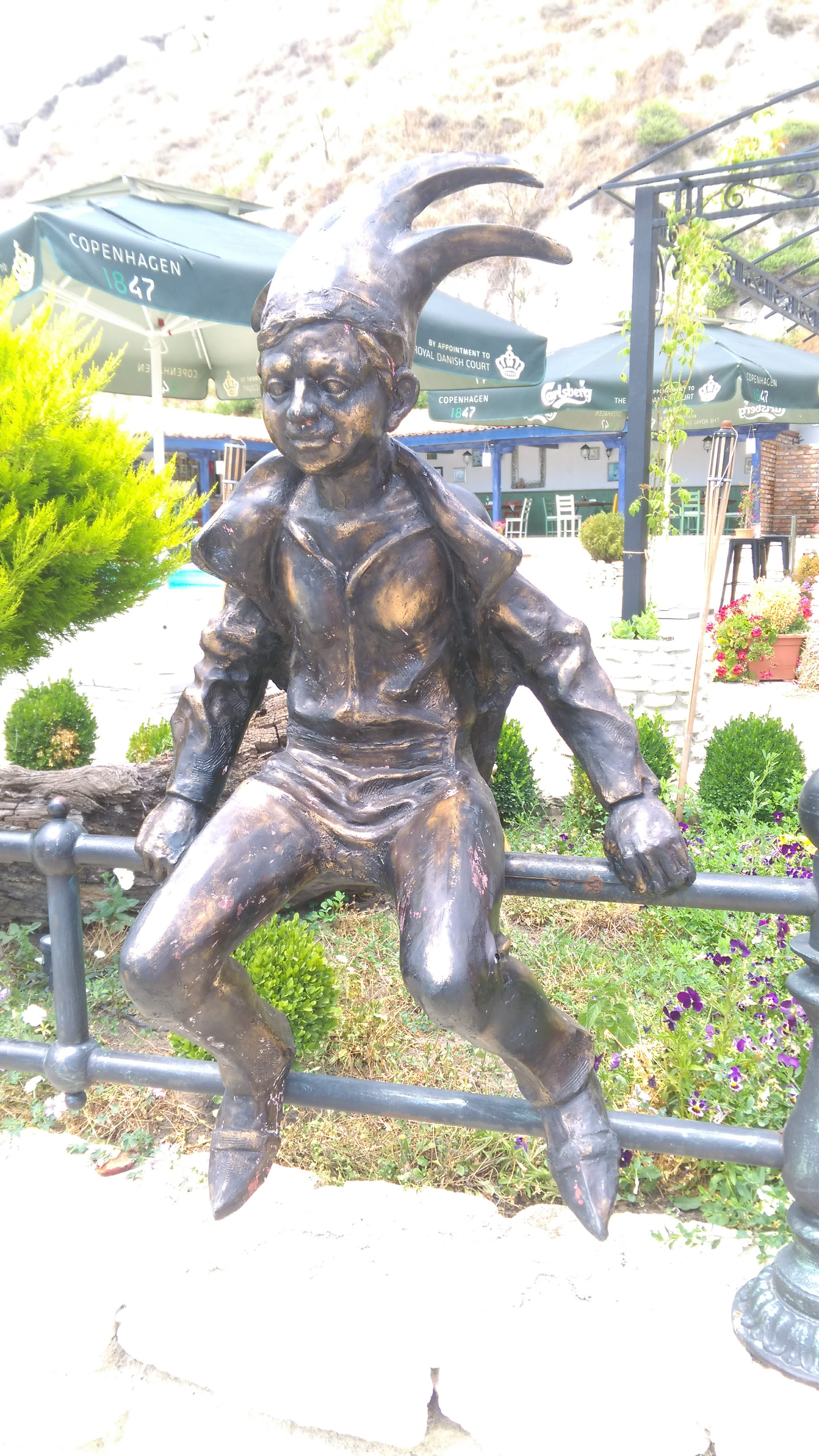
An imitation of László Marton's Little Princess statue

=== Art ===
Held each year since 1991, "The Process – Space Art Festival" is an annual international festival of contemporary art, which takes place over two weeks in June. Balchik Palace also hosts the "In the Palace International Short Film Festival".

=== Music ===
Held annually each summer since 2006 in the nearby town of Kavarna, the Kavarna Rock Fest hosts top-name bands for a three-day festival. Previous acts have included Motörhead, Twisted Sister, Mötley Crüe, Scorpions, Alice Cooper, Deep Purple, and the Michael Schenker Group.

For the last few years, the mayor has cancelled the Kavarna Rock Fest due to different music preference.

=== Sports ===
Balchik is becoming well known internationally as a golfing destination. There are three 18-hole championship golf courses within the local vicinity, two designed by Gary Player - Thracian Cliffs GC and BlackSeaRama GC; and one designed by Ian Woosnam - Lighthouse GC. A fourth 18-hole golf course is currently in the planning stages.

== Trivia ==
- Francis Ford Coppola spent 11 days at the Balchik palace shooting scenes of Youth Without Youth (2007).
- Balchik Ridge, in Antarctica, is named after the town.
- The Balchik Airfield is a both commercial and military airfield near the town.
- Turkish poet Nazım Hikmet wrote his well-known poem "Mavi Liman" ('The Blue Port') in Balchik.

== Twin towns and sister cities ==
Balchik is twinned with:

- Boxberg, Germany
- Bran, Romania
- Cieszyn, Poland
- Galich, Russia
- Hagfors, Sweden
- Mangalia, Romania
- Stará Ľubovňa, Slovakia
- Tambov, Russia
- Valašské Meziříčí, Czech Republic
- Szigetszentmárton, Hungary
- Armutalan, Turkey

== Gallery ==
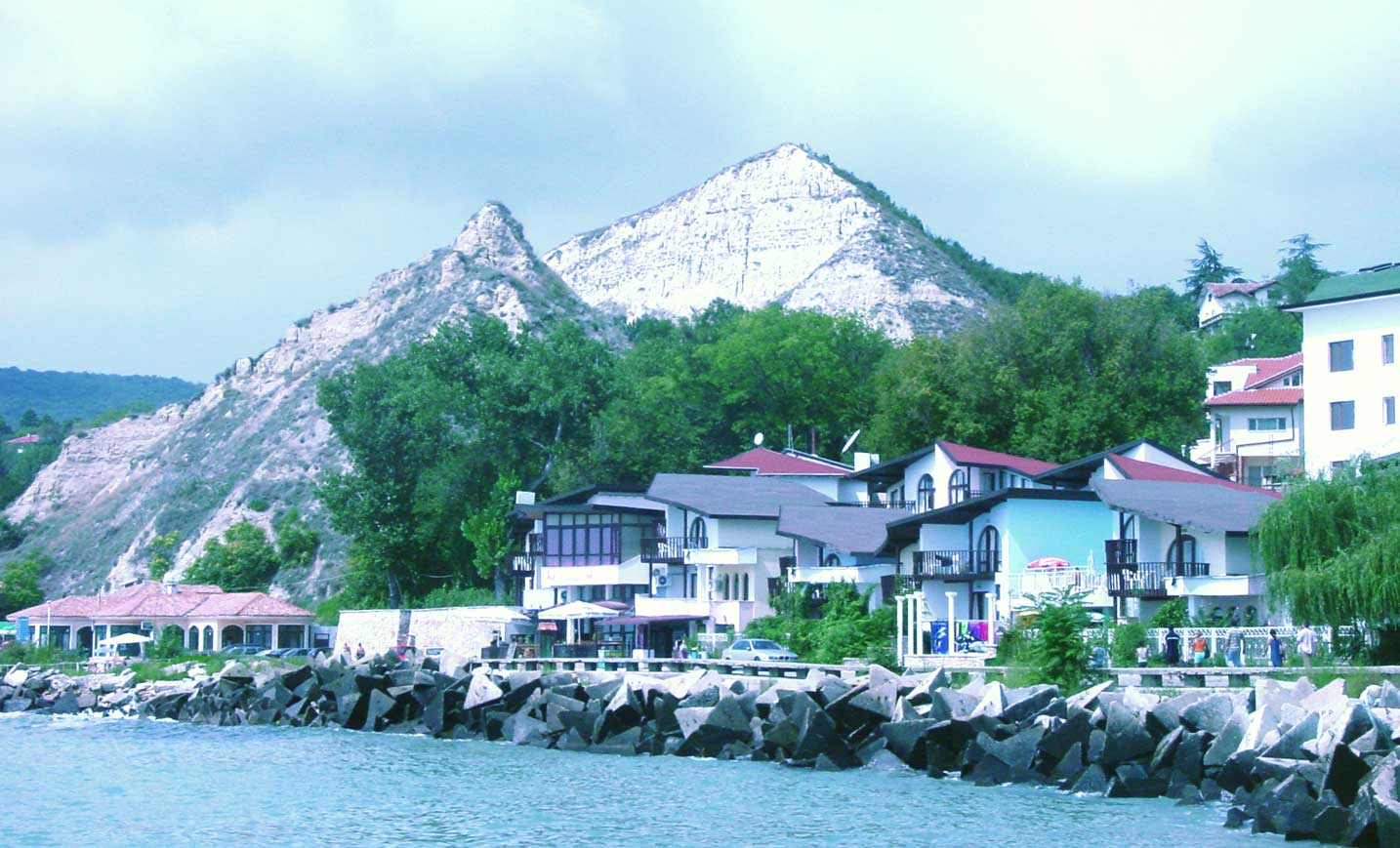
Coastal view with private hotels

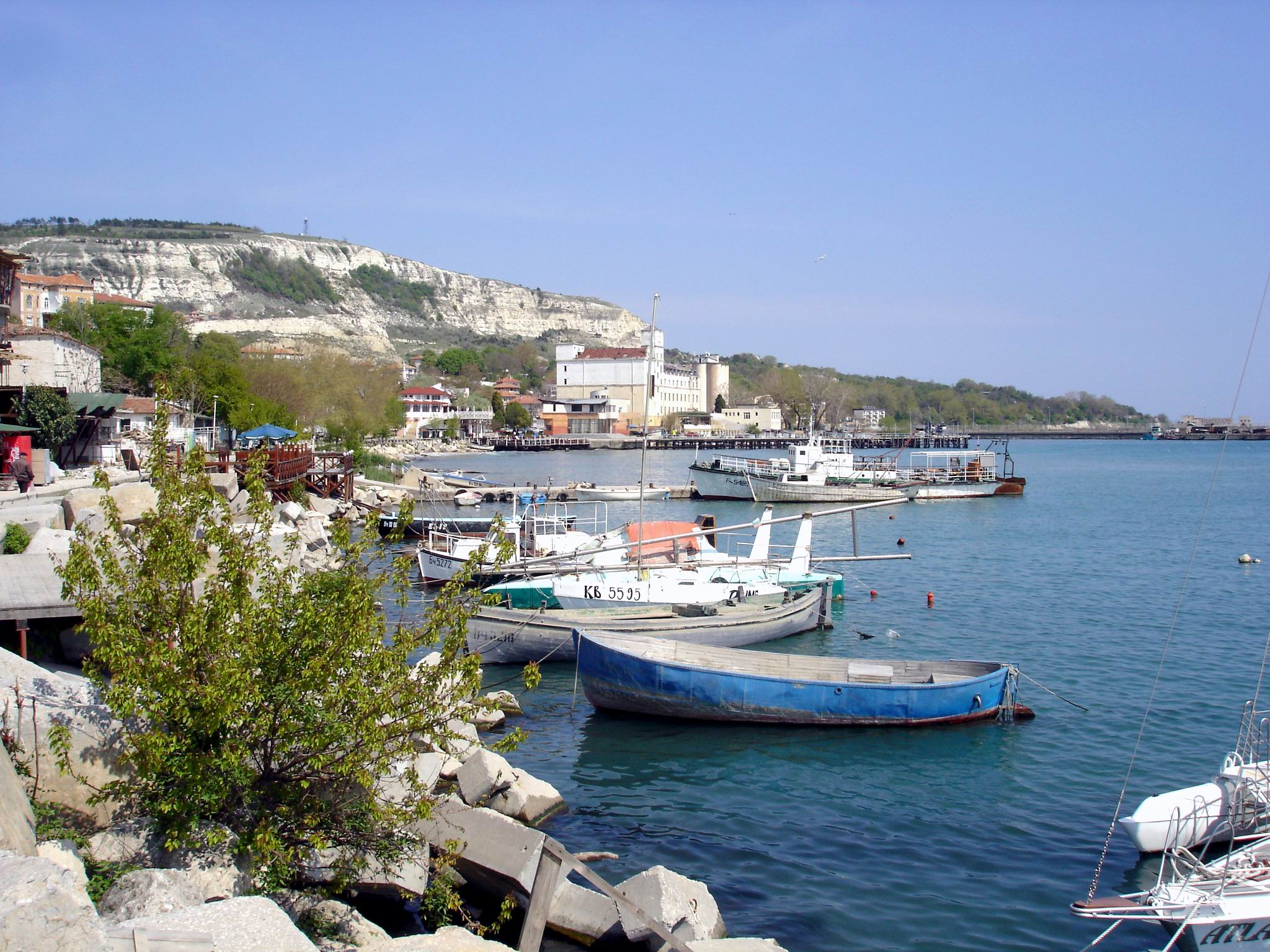
The coast

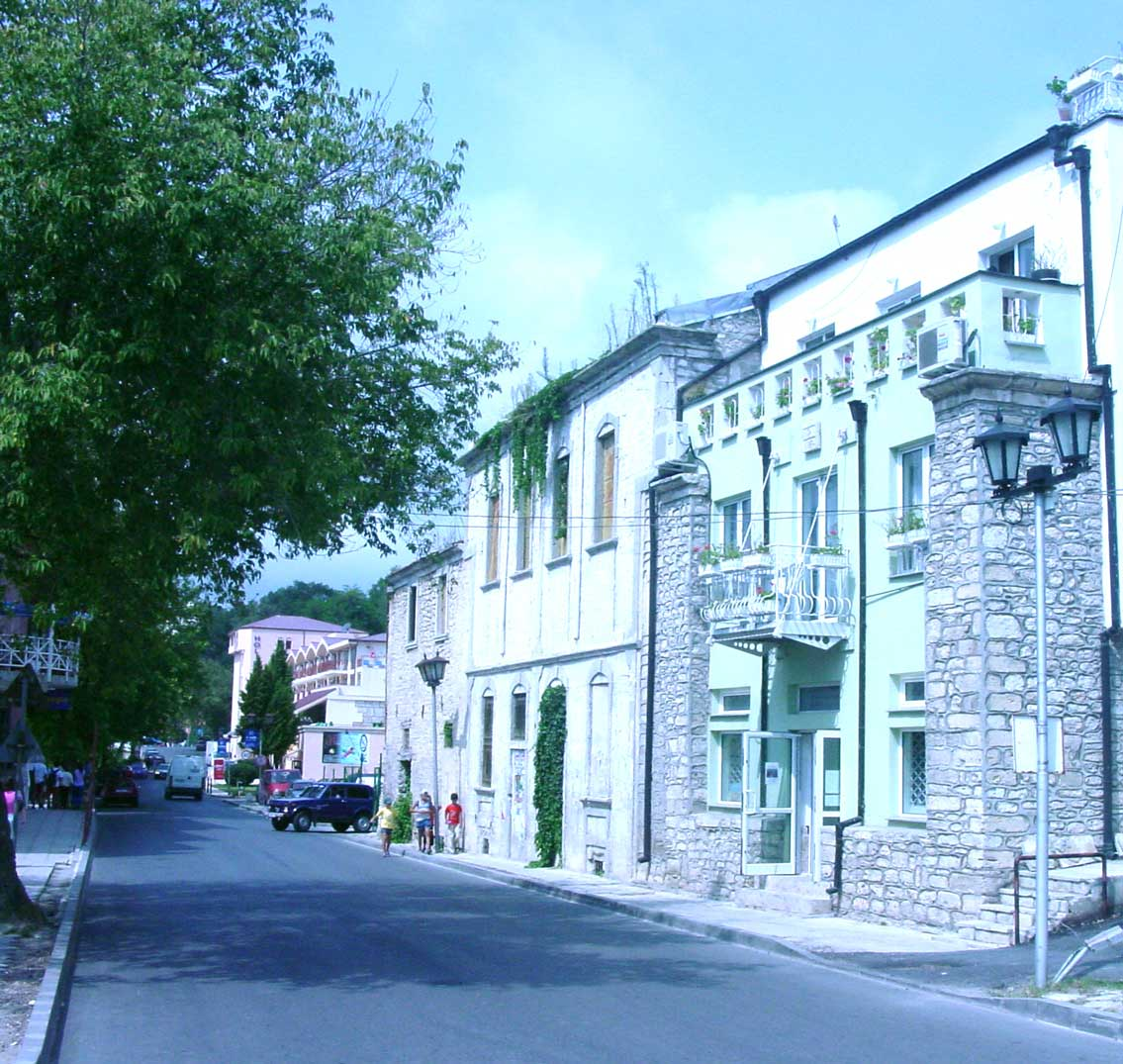
The main street going down the harbour

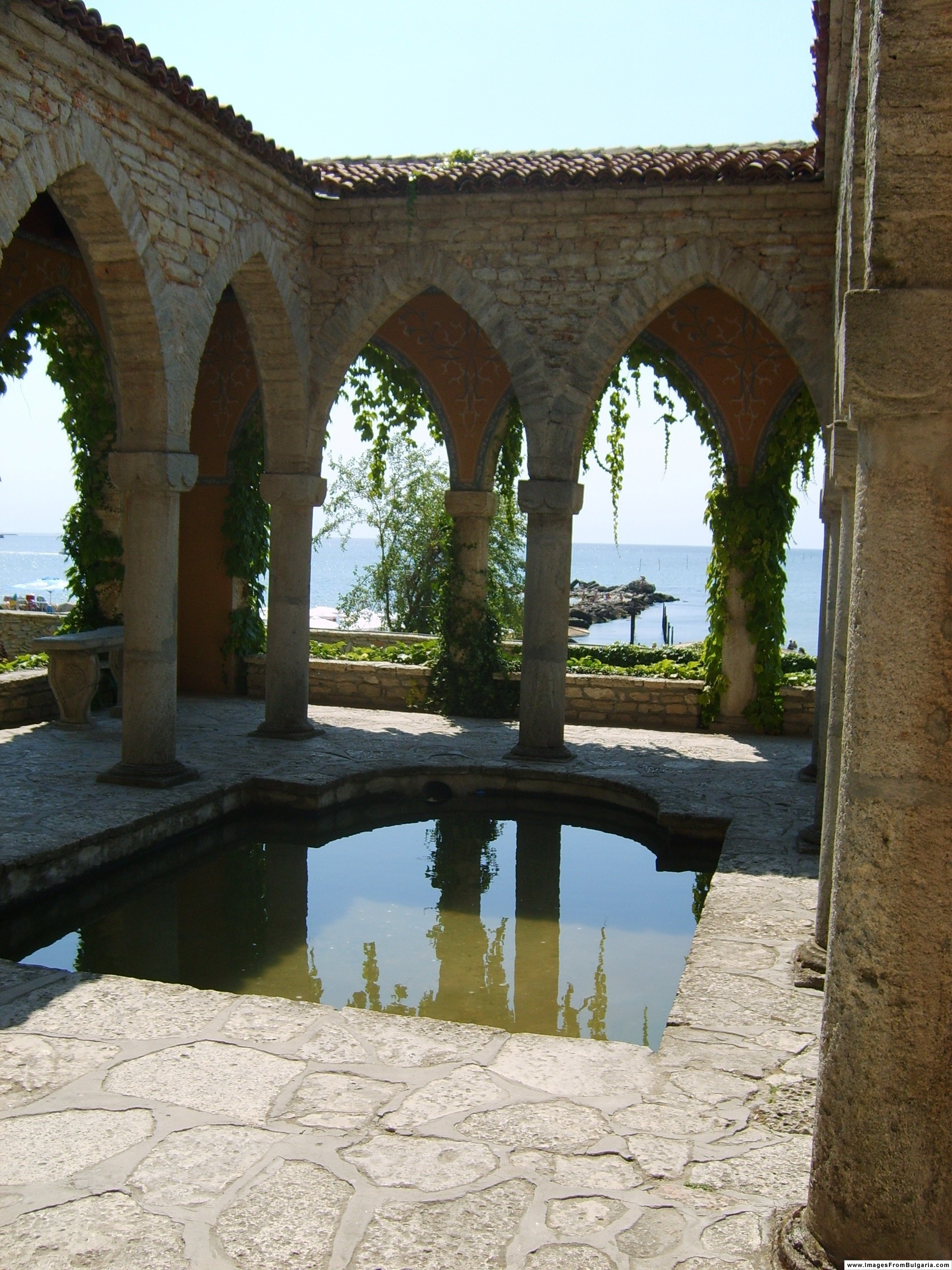
Balchik Palace, pool and portico

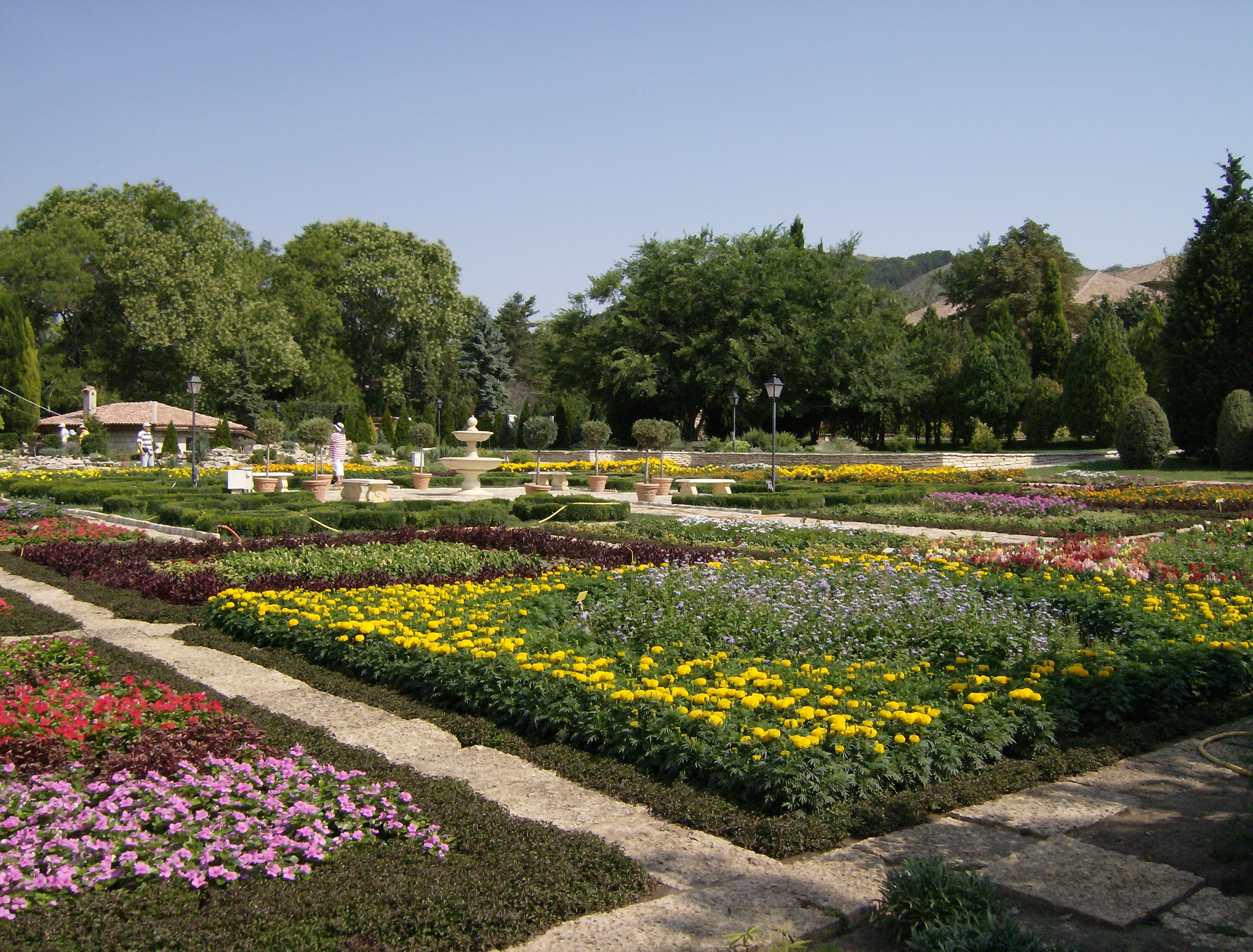
Balchik Palace, the gardens

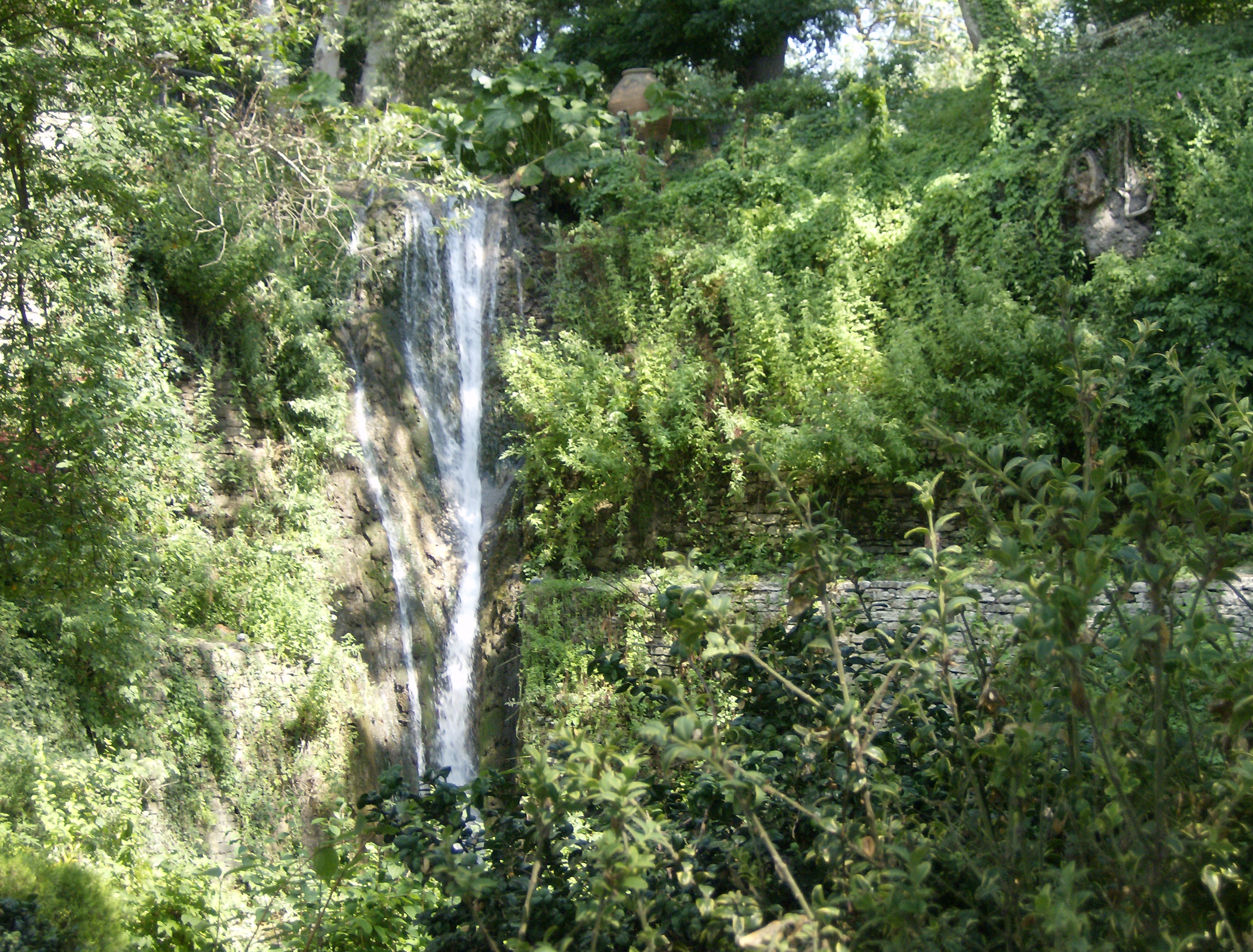
Balchik Palace, waterfall

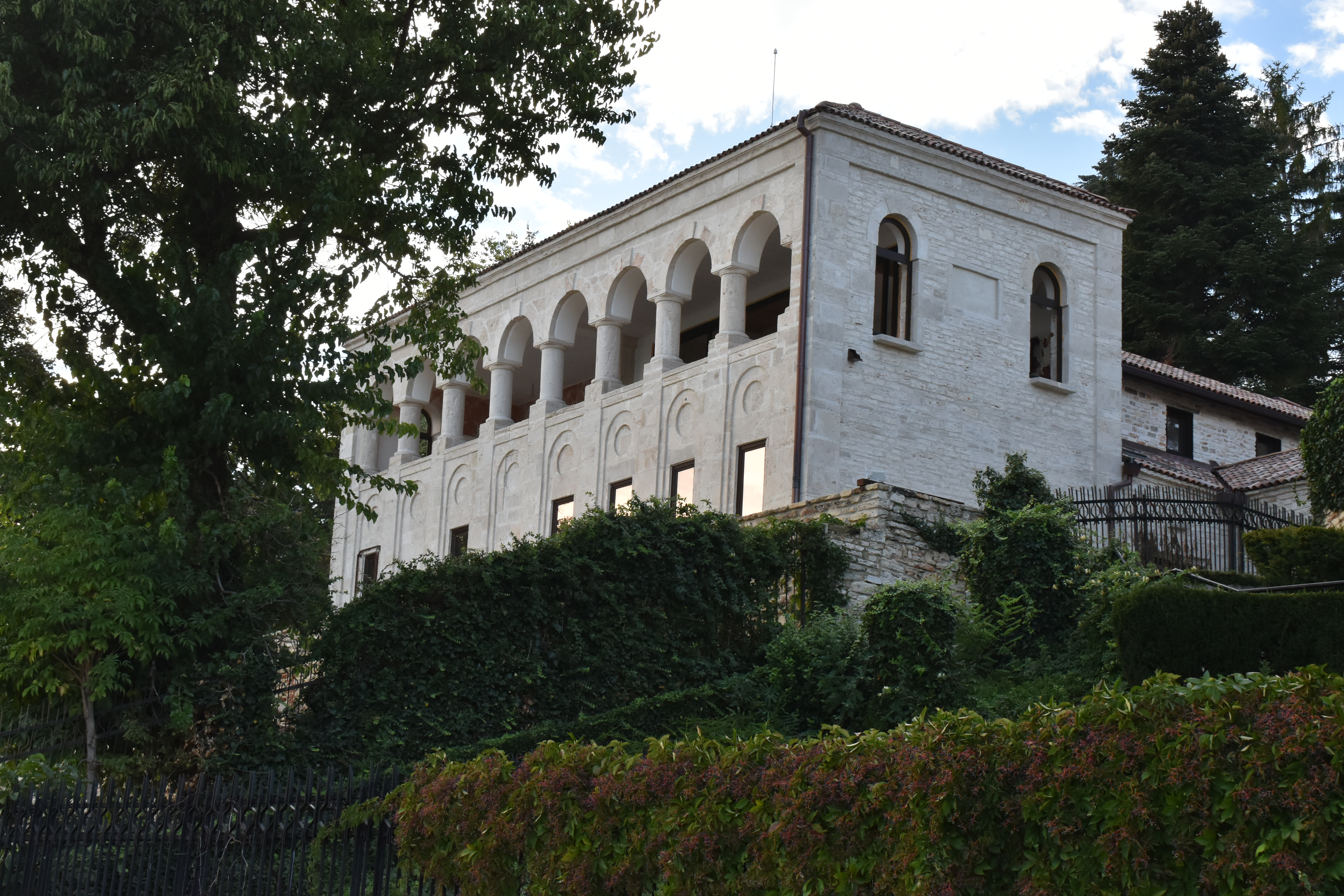
Villa Storck

== See also ==
- Decree of Dionysopolis
- Balchik Palace
- Balchik airport
- Albena
- Bulgarian Black Sea Coast
- Dobrich Province
- Caucasus Cable System
- Turgut Reis Mosque (Balchik)
- Tatar quarter
- Temple of Cybele, Balchik

== Bibliography ==
- Crisan, Ion Horatiu (1978). Burebista and His Time. Bucharest: Bibliotheca Historica Romaniae.
- Mihailov, Georgi (1970). Inscriptiones graecae in Bulgaria repertae (in Latin and Ancient Greek). Vol. 1 (2nd ed.). Sofia: In aedibus typographicis Academiae Litterarum Bulgaricae.
- Oltean, Ioana Adina (2007). Dacia: landscape, colonisation and romanisation. Routledge. ISBN 978-0-415-41252-0.
