= Csobánc =

Hill in the Tapolca Basin, Hungary

- View from Tapolca-Diszel

Highest point
- Elevation: 376 m (1,234 ft)
- Coordinates: 46°52′17″N 17°30′15″E

Geography
- Location: Tapolca-Diszel, Hungary

Csobánc [ˈtʃobaːnts] is a hill in the Tapolca Basin, Hungary.

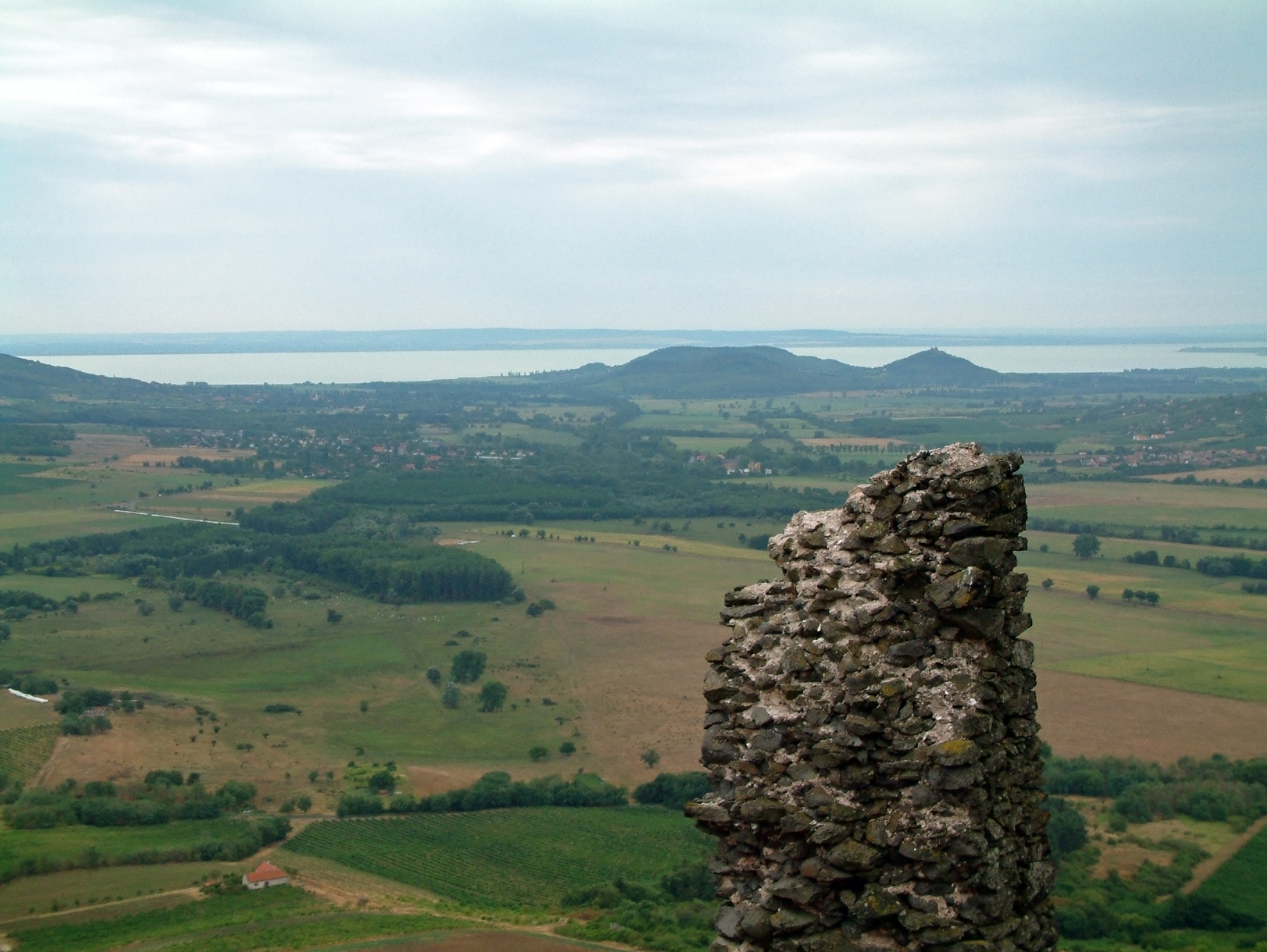
Panoramic view from the top with Lake Balaton in the background

== Geography and environment ==
Csobánc is one of the highlights of the region. Similar to the other hills in the area, it is of volcanic origin. These hills are witness hills. The expression originates from the fact that these hills “witnessed” the decrease of the land surface level during volcanic activity millions of years ago. They preserve the original surface since the Pliocene period.

== Protected natural assets ==
Csobánc is one of the unique and peculiar monadnocks of Tapolca Basin. It is a result of basalt volcanism 3.5 million years ago. Numerous rare habitats in need of protection have been preserved due to the relatively secluded and undisturbed area. The natural assets of Csobánc granted the hill increased protection from the Balaton Uplands National Park and the Bakony-Balaton Geopark.

=== Rock grasses ===
Relatively sheltered habitat due to its inaccessible location along the edges of the plateau. Sensitive to being disturbed and trodded on. Paragliding can be a great danger to the habitat and its characteristic species such as the northern rock-cress (Cardaminopsis petraea) and the unique livelong saxifrage (Saxifaga), both growing on the northern rock walls.

==== Steppe meadows and rocky outcrops ====
For their survival, these habitats are to be left undisturbed. On the south and the east sides of the hills stands of steep surfaces broken up by rocky outcrops are the most sensitive Pasque flower (Pulsatilla grandis), Golden alyssum (Aurinia saxatilis), Prunus mahaleb, and the pubescent oak (Quercus pubescens) bring more color into the landscape.

==== Detrital slope forests ====
The protective forests on the north side of the hill are highly sensitive, the associations living here need to remain intact. The stands consists of small-leaved lime (Tilla cordata), broad-leaved lime (Tilia platyphyllos), Norway maple (Acer platanoides), Sycamore (Acer pseudoplatanus), and Common ash (Fraxinus excelsior). On the grass level a small population of Turk's cap lily (Lilium martagon) is present.

=== Birds ===
Bird species feeding, nesting, or potentially nesting on the hill are the common raven (Corvus corax), the common kestrel (Falco tinnunculus) and the peregrine falcon (Falco peregrinus). They will only settle if their habitat is completely undisturbed in spring. Using the hill as a launch site can cause great damage to the hill's biodiversity.

== Notable sights ==
=== Castle ruins ===
The castle has been attacked by the Turks between 1554 and 1567.

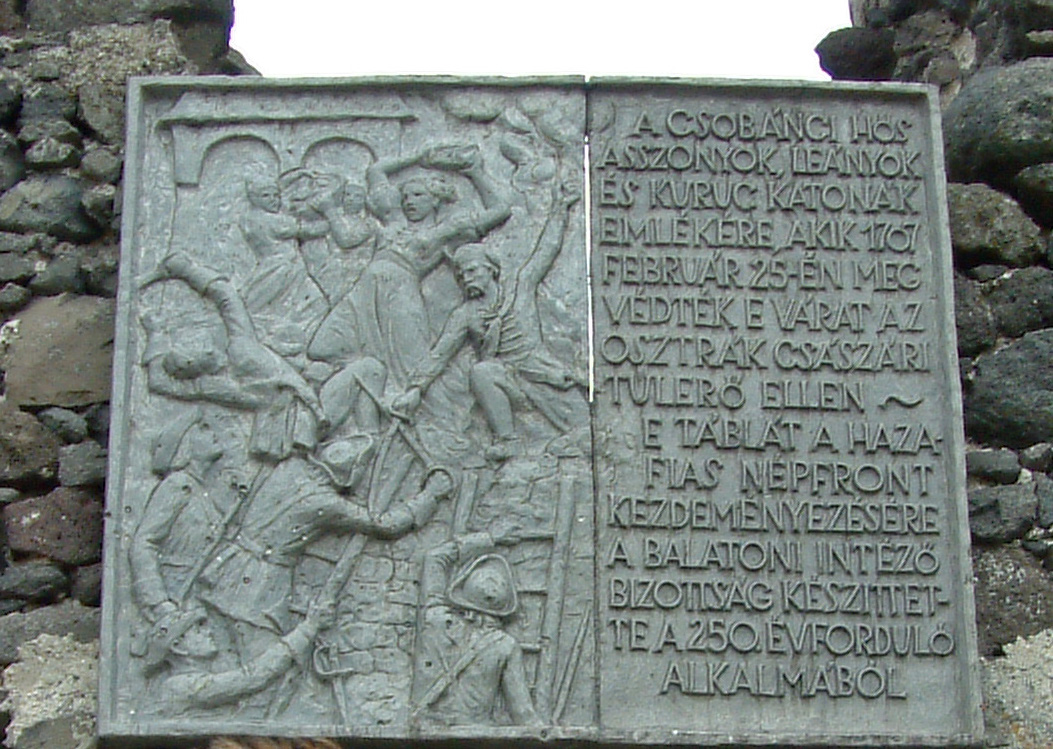
Memorial tablet on the castle wall

Construction works began in 1255 for the first time. The Italian Rátóti Gyulaffy family owned the castle for more than 40 years. Csobánc fell under numerous unsuccessful Turkish sieges in the 16th century. In 1669 the Esterházy family took control over the castle. During the Rákóczi's War for Independence, the heroic Hungarian kuruc defenders were triumphantly able to manage resistance against immense Austrian-Danish united attacks in February 1707. The castle was first destroyed in the 18th century.

The Foundation for the Castle of Csobánc from the neighbouring village Gyulakeszi makes efforts to reconstruct the ruins of the castle. Cultural and historical programs such as riding shows, mediaeval knights in period dresses, Turkish belly dance etc. are offered to raise fund. The most significant festival, Gyulaffy Days (Gyulaffy napok [ˈɟulɒffi ˈnɒpok]), is held annually.

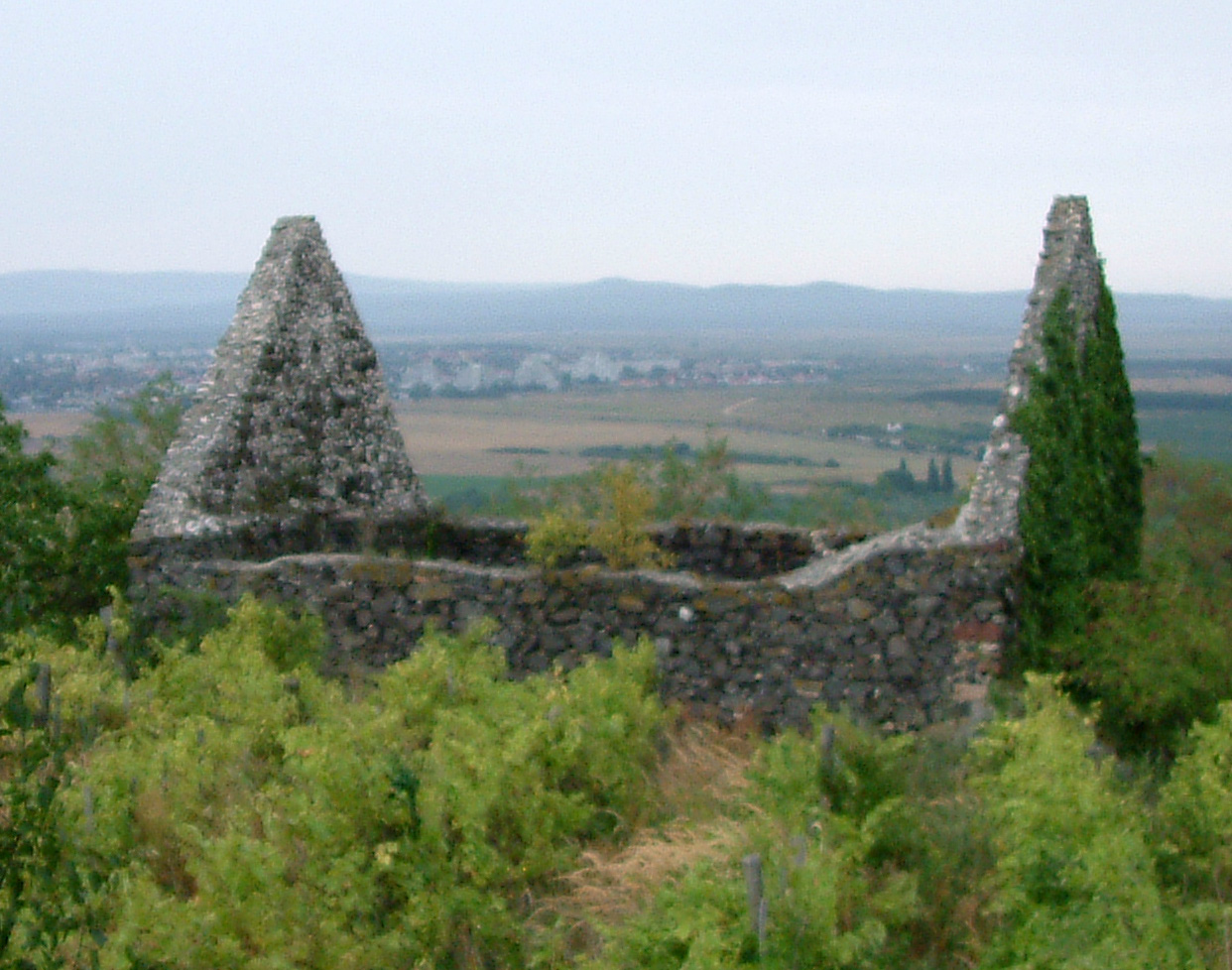
The “Bad Church” on Csobánc, with Tapolca in the background.

=== The “Bad Church” ===
The Rossz-templom (“Bad Church”) is a 13th-century church that was left to decline after the population fled from the Ottomans.

== Hiking the mountain ==
Two tourist paths lead from Tapolca-Diszel to the castle ruins that join together before the real climb. The track has green (L) waymarks. The hill can be approached from two other villages as well, Gyulakeszi and Káptalantóti, however, they are much further.

== Popular activities ==
Paragliders over Csobánc

Due to its thermodynamic features it is an ideal spot for paragliding and ultralight trikes, however, these activities are currently contentious since the hill is a natural preserve. Hiking and geocaching are also popular activities around the area.

== References in literature ==
Poet - literary historian István Péter NÉMETH from Tapolca wrote several poems and articles on Csobánc, including “Greeting from Csobánc”, and “The Requiem of Csobánc”.
