= Diszel =

Tapolca-Diszel
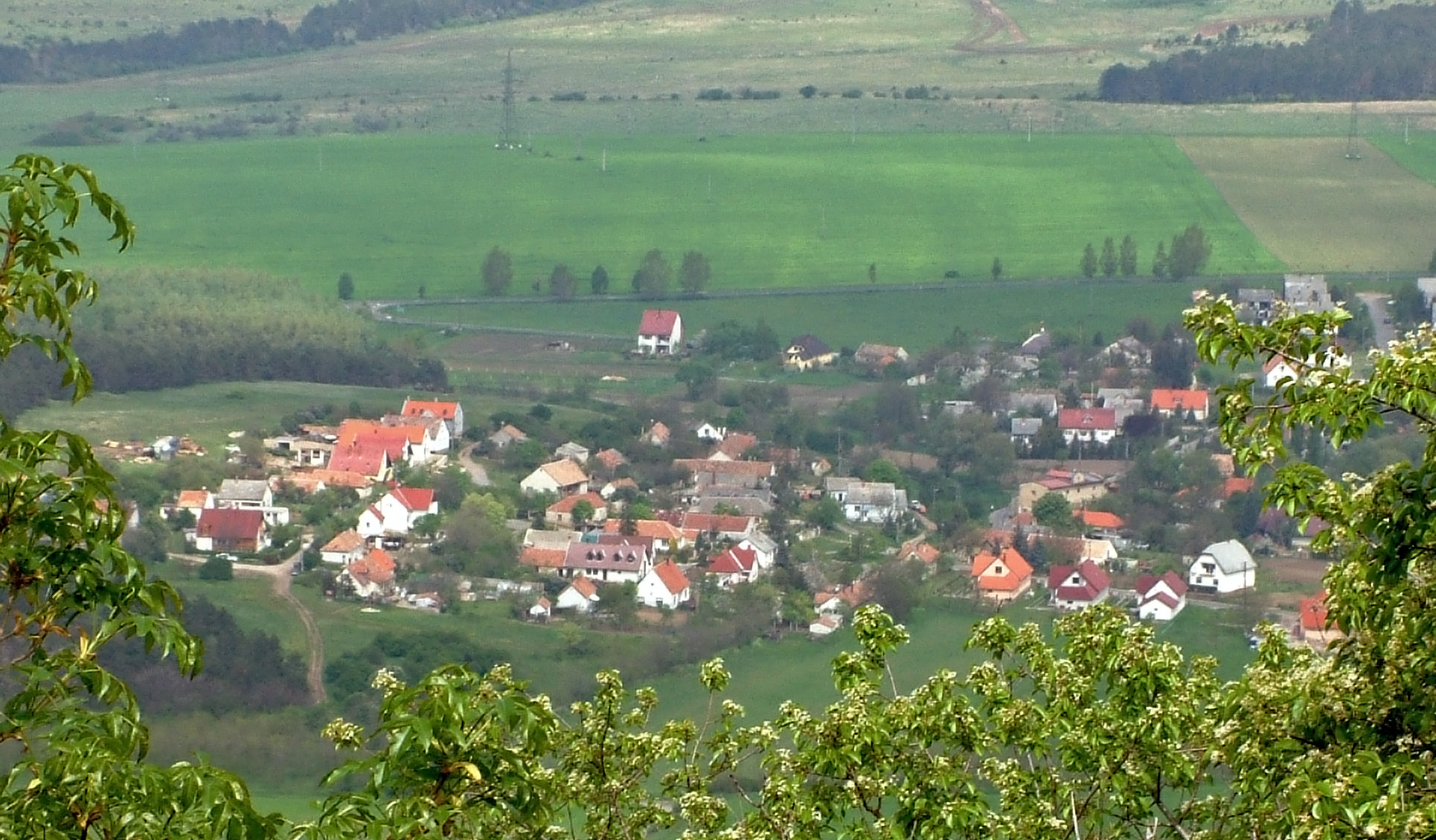
- View of Diszel from the top of Csobánc

- Location of Diszel
- Coordinates: 46°53′10″N 17°29′40″E
- Country: Hungary
- County: Veszprém
- Time zone: UTC+1 (CET)
  - Summer (DST): UTC+2 (CEST)
- Postal code: 8297
- Area code: 87

Diszel (Tapolca Diszel [ˈtɒpoltsɒ ˈdisɛl]) is an outer suburb of Tapolca in Veszprém county, Hungary. Situated in the Tapolca Basin, Diszel is rich in spectacular geological heritage and historical monuments. Diszel is considered one of the most beautiful areas of the country.

== History ==
Diszel has a long history. In 1920, artifacts have been found in the area from the Bronze Age, along with Roman ruins. The area was part of Pannonia province of the Roman Empire. According to popular etymology, the name Diszel was derived from the Hungarian expression "Díszhely" [ˈdiːshɛj] (fancy place), referring to its beauty. The name was first mentioned in 1247. In 1255, the settlement was mentioned officially as Terra nomine Dezl and also as nobiles de Dezl. In 1329, it was called Dyzl, which resembles the current name.

Public map of Diszel

In September 1919, following the fall of the Hungarian Soviet Republic, the village was the site of a pogrom, which involved the murder of nine Jewish residents, sexual violence, looting and property destruction.

Although the settlement has been home for farmers and ranchers for centuries, Diszel has cultural significance as well. Several artists live in and in the vicinity of Diszel. Even celebrities find retreat in the surrounding hills and spend several months here each year.

Poet and literary historian István Péter Németh from Tapolca wrote several poems and articles on Diszel and its surroundings, including "Diszel 1848", "Drawing-board is my professorate", "Greeting from Csobánc", and "The Requiem of Csobánc".

Once a village, Diszel lost its municipal independence in 1977, when it became a suburb of Tapolca. Since then, it has been referred to as Tapolca-Diszel for years, which is now often written as Tapolca (Diszel).

== Geography ==
Diszel is in the Tapolca Basin surrounded by hills of volcanic origin. The area is part of the Balaton Uplands National Park. Its proximity to Lake Balaton makes Diszel an ideal destination for both hikers and tourists.

== Notable sights ==
Hussars in Diszel

Despite the relatively small size of the settlement, there are many sights to see. Diszel has many architectural treasures, including ancient monuments, old watermill ruins, sculptures, and exhibitions. There is a museum and two galleries in Diszel. Dating back to the 18th century, a narrow stone bridge connects the banks of Eger Creek in the center. The backyard of the Local Community Centre gives place to a sculpture exhibition. Several grave monuments of nobles as well as memorials from World War II are placed in the cemetery. In Diszel there is a riding-hall called "Lightning" (Villám Lovaspanzió [ˈvillaːm ˈlovɒʃpɒnzioː]). Riding tours are organized to the hill Csobánc, which is a nice destination not only for equestrians, but hikers and paragliders as well. On the top of the hill there are castle ruins that survived five centuries.

=== "Roman bridge" ===
The "Roman bridge" of Diszel has been ordered by the then Zala county. The bridge that can be seen today has been built in summer 1793 by stonemason Károly Schraz from Sümeg.

=== Sculpture of St. John of Nepomuk ===
The sculpture of the patron saint of Bohemia, St. John of Nepomuk can be found on the "Roman bridge" of Diszel.

=== Church ===
The original church of Diszel had been built in the 13th century, however, it has been destroyed by the Turks during the Ottoman–Hungarian Wars.

The church of the local parish was built in the 18th century, preserving carvings from the Roman Times.

The organ of the church was built in the late 19th century, is still functional and used during masses.

=== World War I Monument ===
In the center there is a monument of World War I soldiers. 52 names are listed.

=== First Hungarian Spectacle Collection ===
The "First Hungarian Spectacle Collection" (Első Magyar Látványtár [ˈɛlʃøː ˈmɒɟɒr ˈlaːtvaːɲtaːr]) is the museum of Diszel. It provides exhibitions on various topics in every 2–3 years. Situated in the reconstructed building of an old watermill, the museum has a cheerful café and a large yard with the Csobánc in the background. It is an ideal place for literary premiere and musical performances.

=== Tisza-Kalmár Gallery ===
Tisza-Kalmár Galéria [ˈtisɒ ˈkɒlmaːr ˈɡɒleːriɒ] is the gallery of the artist György Tisza-Kalmár. He is a polyhistor with a wide range of artwork, including drawings, paintings, graphic arts, coat of arms, and woodcrafts. The exhibition room can be found in the proximity of the church.

=== Retro Exchange Gallery ===
The "Retro Exchange Gallery" (Retro Anyagcsere Galéria [ˈrɛtro ˈɒɲɒɡtʃɛrɛ ˈɡɒleːriɒ]) was opened in 2009. It is a constantly changing collection of artwork, tools, and old-fashioned clothes that can be exchanged for other "treasures".

Paragliders over Csobánc

=== The castle ruins of "Csobánc" ===
The closest hill to the South is called Csobánc [ˈtʃobaːnts] with a height of 376 m. A walking trail leads from the village to the castle ruins. Due to its thermodynamic features it is an ideal spot for paragliding and ultralight trikes. Hiking and geocaching are also popular activities around the area.

== Associations ==
=== The Sport Association of Diszel ===
Diszel has a football team. Their colors, yellow and blue, are represented also on the coat of arms of Diszel.

=== Talented Youth Association Diszel ===
The "Talented Youth Association Diszel" (Talentum Ifjúsági Egyesület Diszel [ˈtɒlɛntum ˈifjuːʃaːɡi ˈɛɟɛʃylɛt]) is a popular team of enthusiastic, devoted youngsters. The name is some kind of agnomination since TIED is not just the abbreviation of the official name but has the meaning 'yours'. TIED often contributes to various community activities either as a participant or organizer, including several programmes, the annual grape harvest festival, or creek bank cleaning. The major aims of the association are

- Collection and transmission of folk art and cultural values, including spiritual, musical, dance and architectural traditions
- Organization of youth programmes, including artistic and sports programmes, travelling, hiking, theatricals, concerts, and exhibitions
- Tradition preservation
- Protection of natural treasures of the Balaton Uplands
- Encouragement of amateur artists and artistic activities

In 2010, TIED published a DVD on Diszel as a participant of the European Union project 'Youth in Action'.

=== "Corrosion Removers" ===
Snapshot of an oldtimer motorcycle meeting of 'Corrosion Removers'

The local oldtimer club Association of Oldtimers "Corrosion Removers" (Rozsdamarók Veteránjármű Egyesülete [ˈroʒdɒmɒroːk ˈvɛtɛraːnjaːrmyː ˈɛɟɛʃylɛtɛ]) was founded in 2000. A traditional oldtimer motorcycle meeting is held around Midsummer Day annually. Additionally, tours are organized throughout the year. Media appearances are frequent, especially in the press. The association has international reputation.
