= Danube Promenade =

Promenade in Budapest, Hungary

Coordinates: 47°29′44″N 19°2′55″E

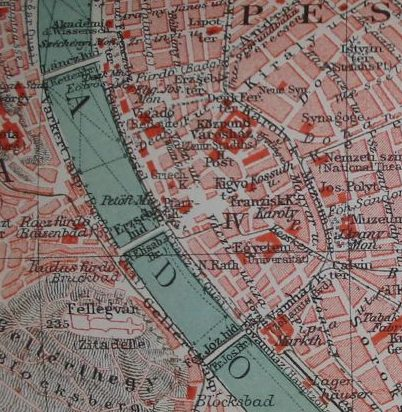
Budapest, Meyers Lexikon, the "1905 new" Erzsébet Bridge, Széchenyi Chain Bridge, Gellért Hill.

The Danube Promenade (Hungarian: Dunakorzó) is located on the Pest side of Budapest, Hungary. The promenade itself lies on the left bank of the Danube, extending from the Széchenyi Chain Bridge to the Erzsébet Bridge.

== History ==
From the middle of the 19th century the city center has developed rather fast. On the left bank of the Danube a row of hotels began to rise. These were the Hungária, Bristol (Duna Szálló), Carlton, and Ritz (Duna palota). Among them only Bristol survived the destruction of World War II, but in 1969 the hotel was demolished. In front of the hotels an esplanade took shape that later became known as Dunakorzó (En: Danube Boardwalk).

== Along the esplanade ==
The southern end of the promenade is the Március 15 Square, where the remains of a Roman bastion, Contra-Aquincum, are displayed, The Inner City Parish Church’s simple exterior conceals a colorful past: it was built as a Romanesque basilica and later was used as a mosque during the Turkish occupation and was finally reconceived in the baroque style in the 18th century.

The center of the promenade is the Vigadó Square with the famous Vigadó Concert Hall.

At the other end of the street can be found Gresham-palota and the Hungarian Academy of Sciences.

=== Important buildings and landmarks around the promenade ===
- Contra-Aquincum, a 4th century Roman fortress next to Erzsébet Bridge
- Inner City Parish Church
- Vigadó Concert Hall
- Gresham-palota
- Hungarian Academy of Sciences next to Széchenyi Chain Bridge

=== Sculptures ===
- István Széchenyi - near to the Hungarian Academy of Sciences
- József Eötvös - 1879 sculptor Huszár Adolf
- Hungarian Seaman Memorial - the anchor of "Ungvár" (copy) - Szende Pál utca
- József Nádor Archduke Joseph, Palatine of Hungary
- Little Princess - near to Vigadó Concert Hall - Also in Marton László sculptors garden Naphegy Tigris utca, with other works.
- Attila József - famous poet of "At the Danube" also by László Marton (sculptor) at Hungarian Parliament Building
- Mihály Vörösmarty
- William Shakespeare
- Petőfi Sándor
- Shoes on the Danube Promenade Gyula Pauer and Can Togay - April 16. 2005.

== Gallery ==
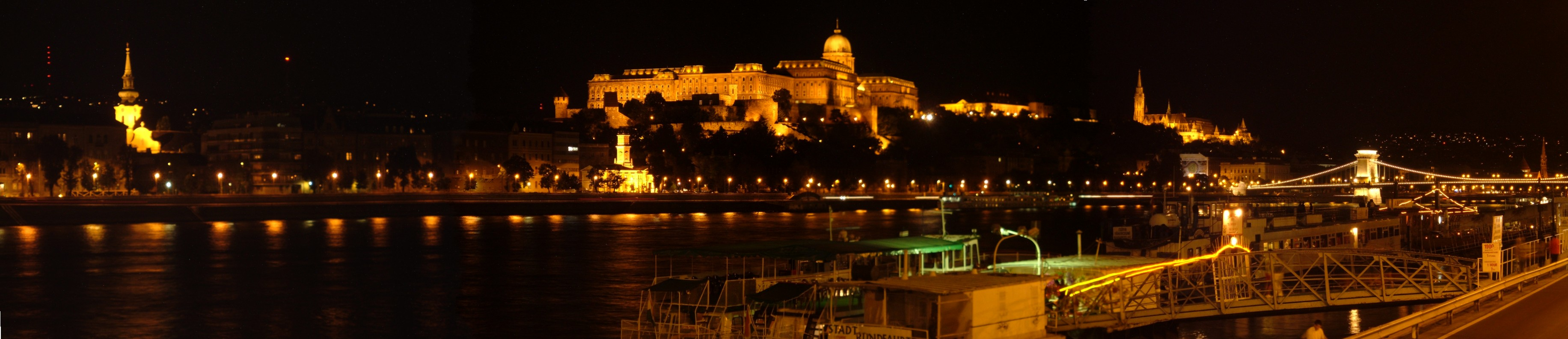
Night view of the Danube and the Castle from the promenade. From left to right: Tabán Church; Buda Castle with the Royal Palace at night; Matthias Church; Széchenyi Chain Bridge
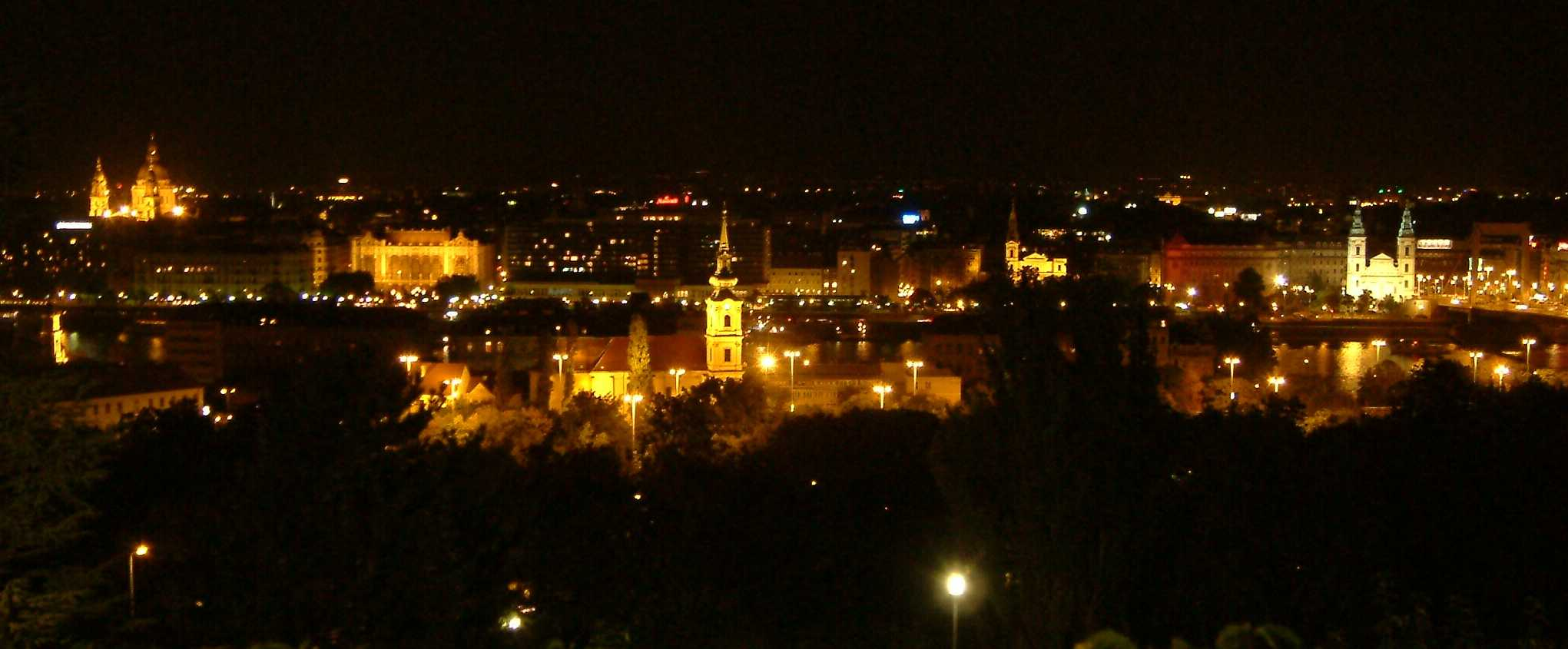
Night view of the promenade from Naphegy. From the left: Saint Stephen's Basilica and Vigadó Concert Hall; In the front Tabán Church; on the right side: Erzsébet Bridge

Pictures of the promenade from the 1910s.

The promenade with people having a walk

Petőfi Sándor Square

The promenade

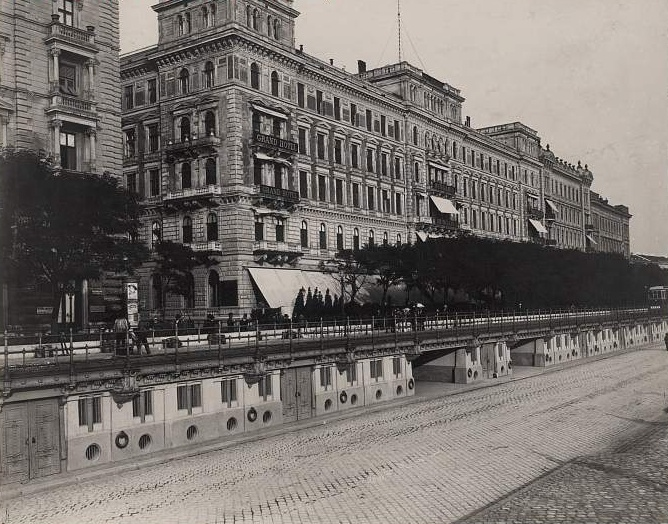
Grand Hotel Hungária
Some important monuments

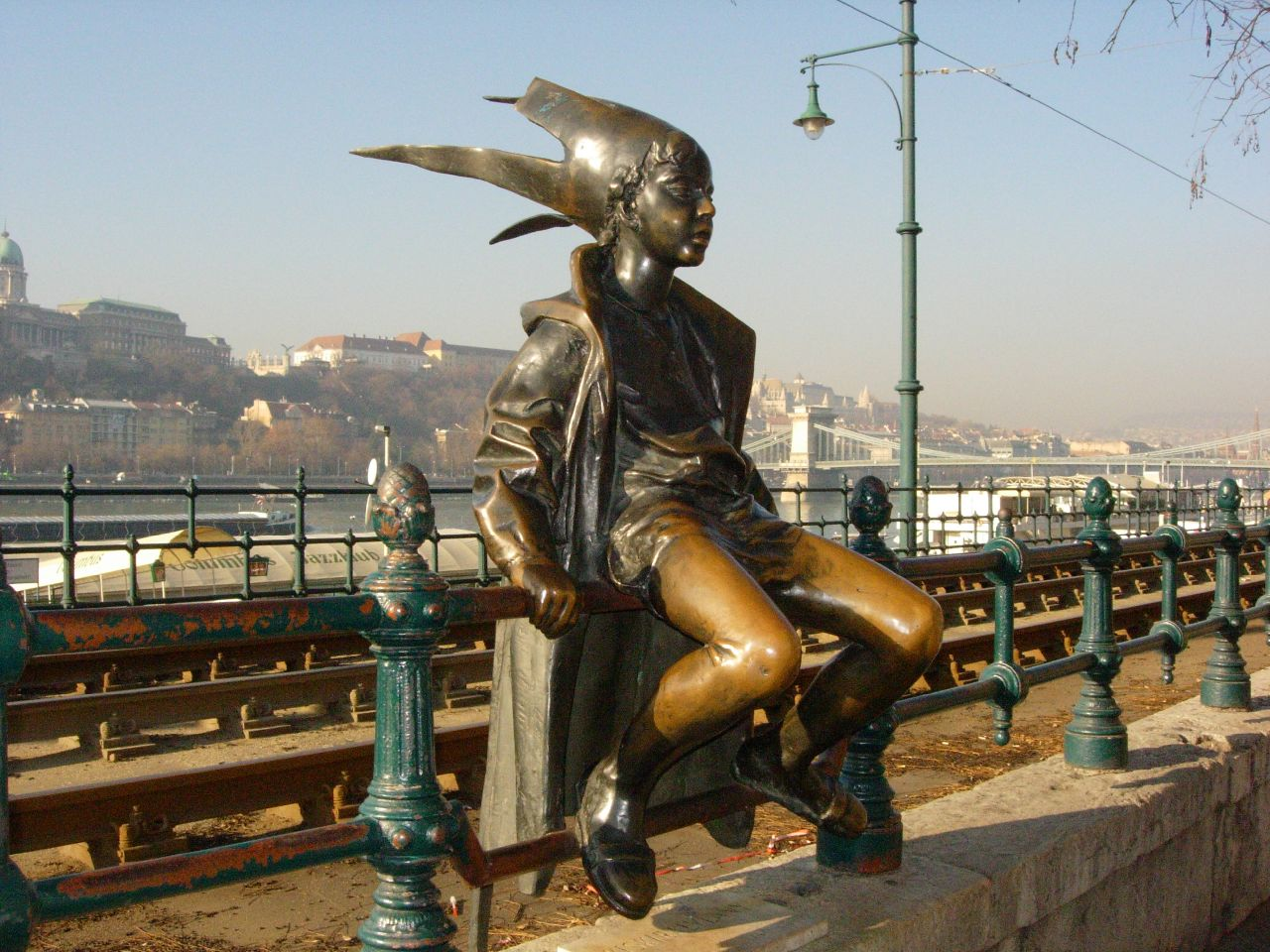
The Little Princess

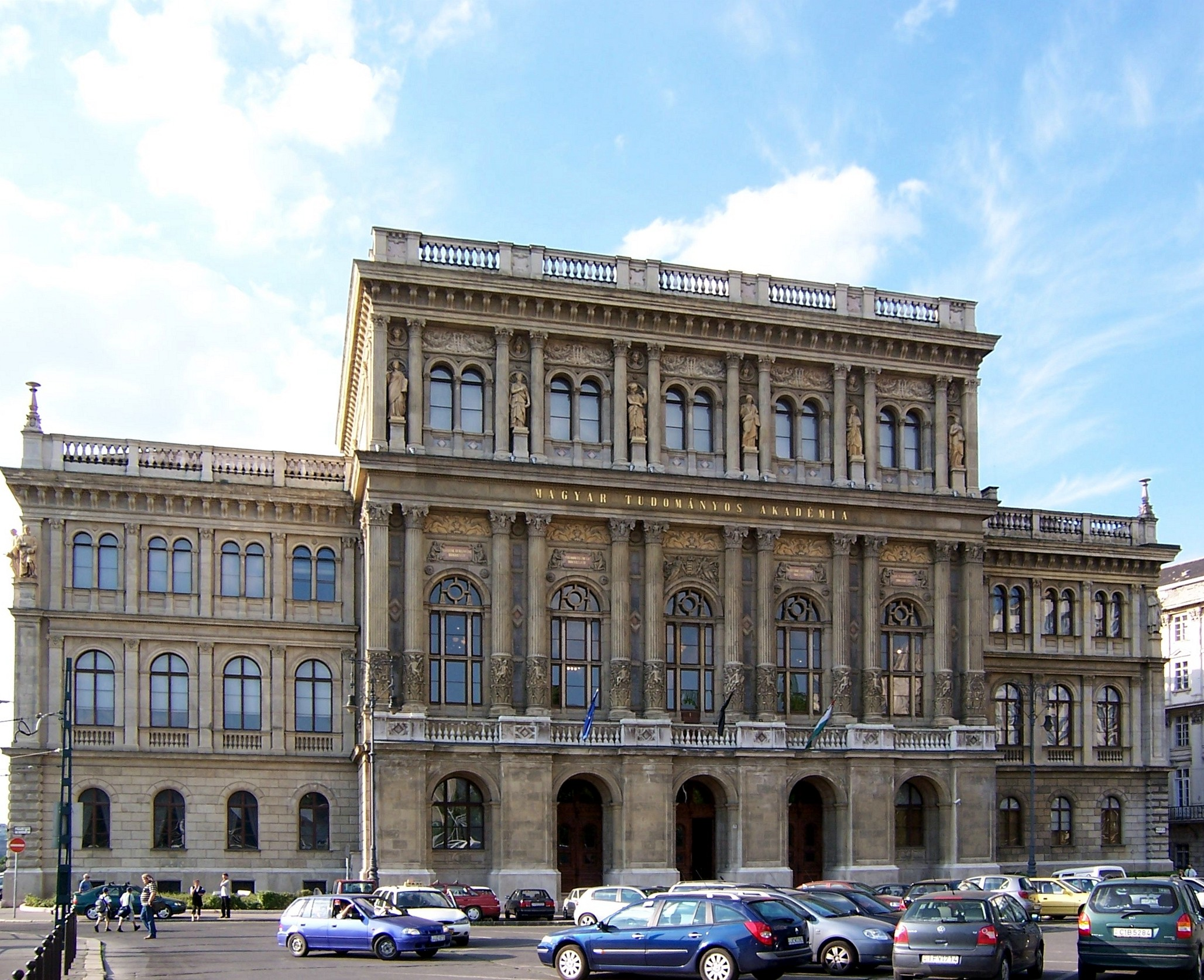
Hungarian Academy of Sciences

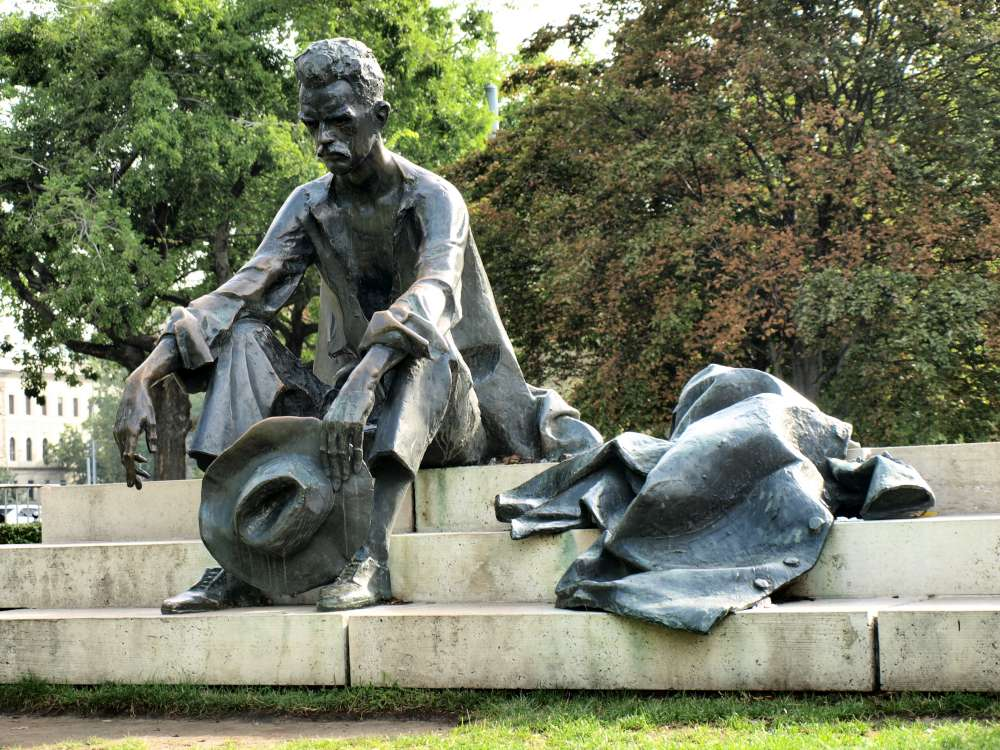
The statue of Attila József

== See also ==
- Naphegy
- Shoes on the Danube Promenade
- Tabán
- World Heritage Site

== Sources ==
- Budapest Info
- www.visitbudapest.travel
- www.welovebudapest.com
