= Sumegi =

Sumegi or Sümegi is a Hungarian surname. Notable people with the surname include:

- John Sumegi (born 1954), Australian flatwater canoeist
- Pál Sümegi (born 1960), Hungarian geoarchaeologist
