= Little Princess statue =

Sculpture in Budapest, Hungary

Little Princess Statue, Budapest (Kiskirálylány)
- Kiskirálylány szobor (Statue) (Hungarian)
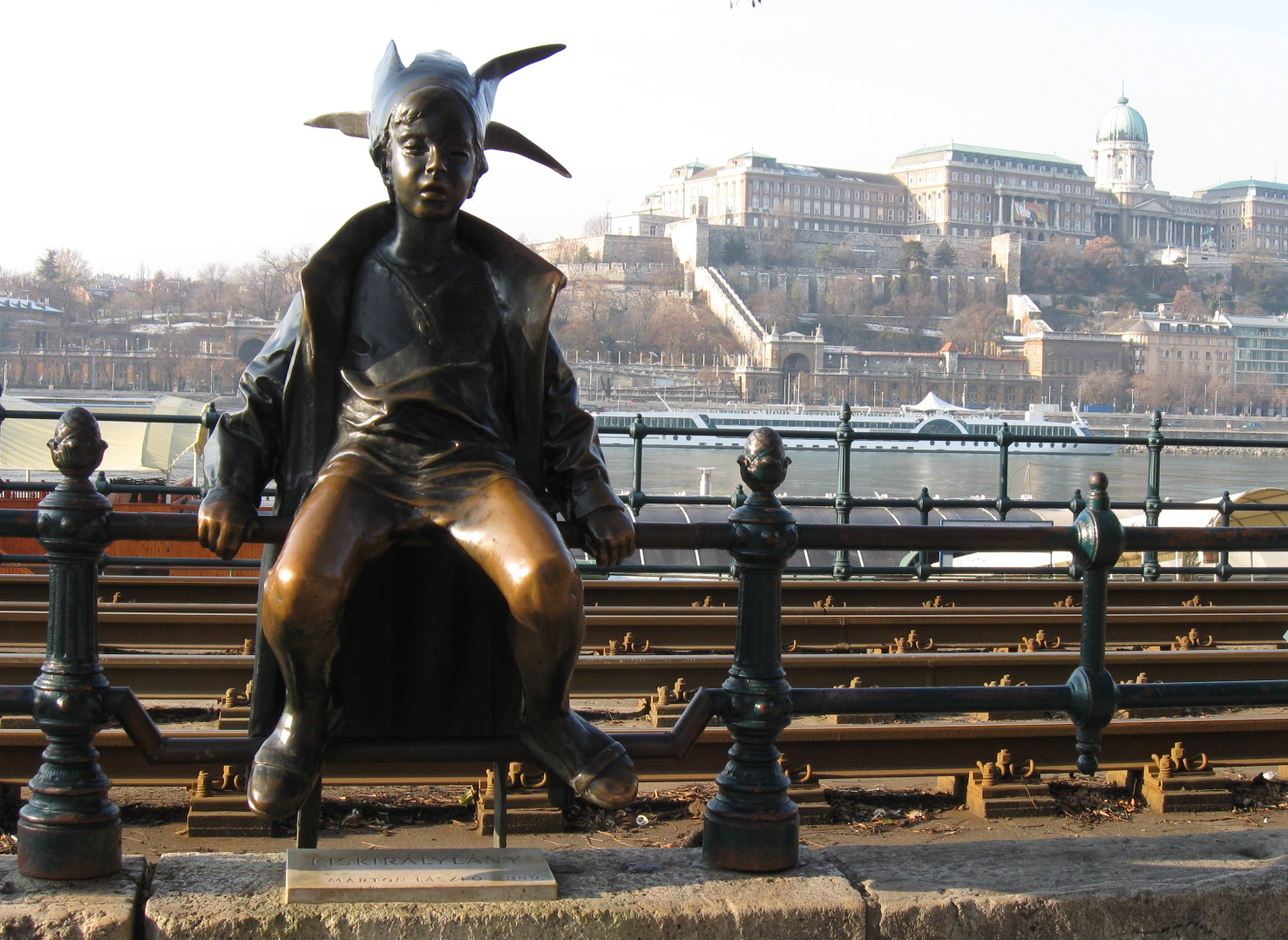
- Little Princess Statue in Budapest, Hungary.
- Artist: László Marton
- Year: 1972/1990
- Dimensions: 50 cm (20 in)
- Location: Budapest, Hungary; 47.49593°N 19.04817°E

Little Princess (Hungarian: Kiskirálylány) is a statue of a small girl sitting on the railings of the Danube Promenade in Budapest, Hungary. It is the work of the Kossuth Prize-winning sculptor László Marton (1925–2008), who made the original 50-centimetre (20 in) statuette in 1972; the life-size version on the promenade was unveiled in 1990. (Note: The website about the statue gives 1989 as the year the larger version was installed.) The original statuette is in the Hungarian National Gallery.

The model was Marton's eldest daughter, Évi, from his first marriage, who liked to dress up as a princess. Marton recalled seeing her play in the Tabán in a princess costume, with a bathrobe as a mantle and a crown he had made for her out of newspaper. When the city later asked him for a statue, he offered this figure.

Copies of the statue stand in Tapolca, the sculptor's home town, and in front of the concert hall of the Tokyo Metropolitan Art Space, to which Marton donated it. Of his more than forty works in Budapest, Marton was proudest of Little Princess and his statue of the poet Attila József.
