= Pál Sümegi =

Hungarian geoarchaeologist

Pál Sümegi (born 11 May 1960 in Tapolca) is a Hungarian geoarchaeologist at the University of Szeged.

== Work ==
- The geohistory of Bátorliget Marshland : an example for the reconstruction of late Quaternary environmental changes and past human impact from Northeastern part of the Carpatgian Basin. Ed. with Sándor Gulyás. Budapest : Archaeolingua Alapítvány, 2004. 356 p. : ill. (Ser. Archaeolingua; ISSN 1215-9239; 16.) ISBN 963-8046-47-3
- Loess and Upper Paleolithic environment in Hungary : an introduction to the environmental history of Hungary. Nagykovácsi : Aurea, 2005. 312 p. ill. ISBN 963-218-212-X; ISBN 963-218-212-X
- Environmental archaeology in north-eastern Hungary. With Erika Gál and Imola Juhász. Budapest : Archaeological Institute of the Hungarian Academy of Sciences, 2005. 426 p. : ill. (Ser. Varia archaeologica Hungarica, ISSN 0237-9090; 19.) ISBN 963-7391-88-6
- Environmental archaeology in Transdanubia. With Csilla Zatykó and Imola Juhász. Budapest : Archaeological Institute of the Hungarian Academy of Sciences, 2007. 390 p. ill. (Ser. Varia archaeologica Hungarica; ISSN 0237-9090; 20.) ISBN 978-963-7391-94-1
