= Káptalantóti =

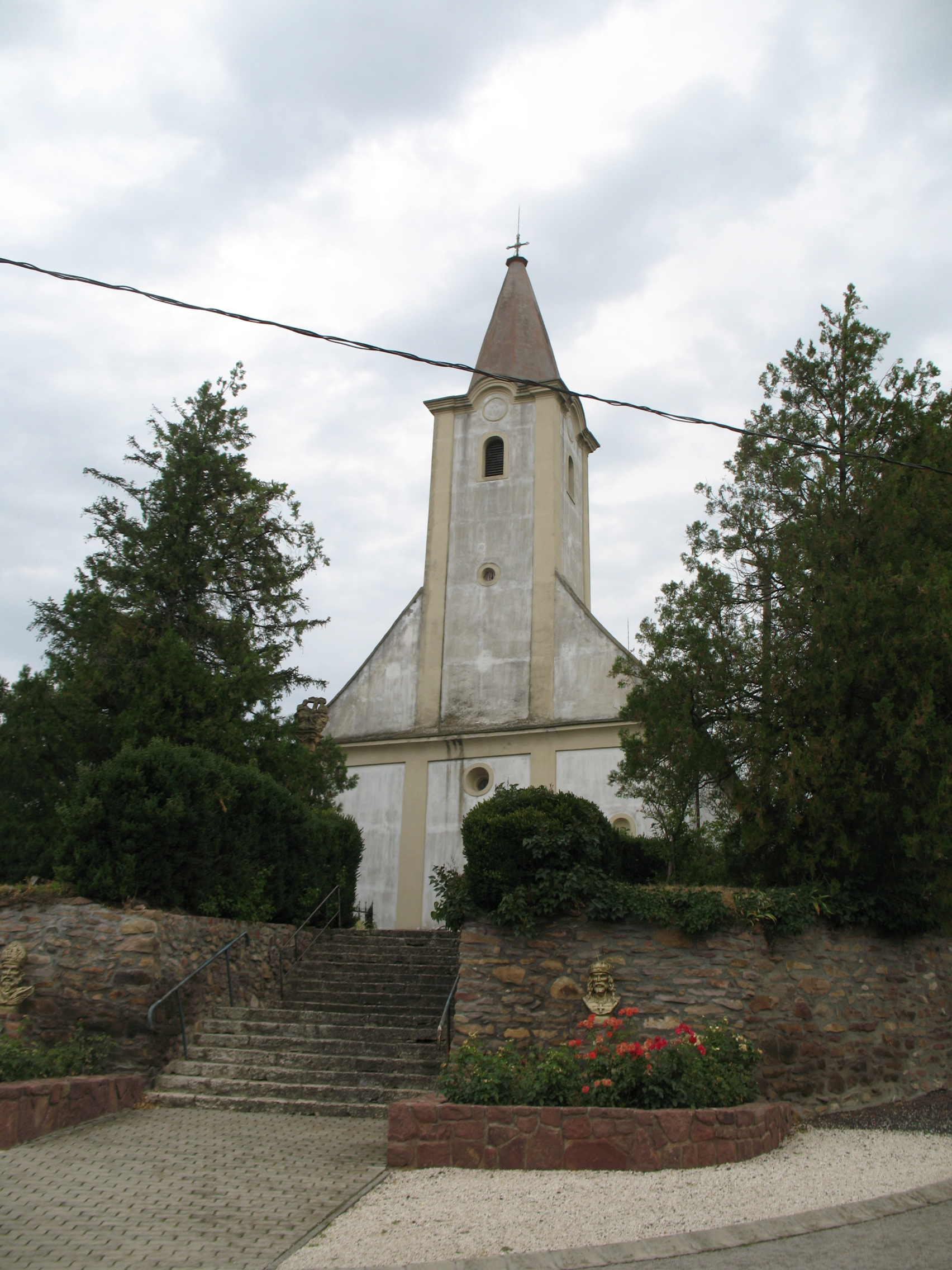
- The Roman Catholic Church in Káptalantóti

- Coat of arms

- Location of Veszprém county in Hungary

- Location of Káptalantóti in Hungary
- Coordinates: 46.84925°N 17.51411°E
- Country: Hungary
- County: Veszprém

Government
  - Mayor: Csom Károlyné (Ind.)

Area
  - Total: 11.73 km^{2} (4.53 sq mi)

Population (2022)
  - Total: 467
  - Density: 39.8/km^{2} (103/sq mi)
- Time zone: UTC+1 (CET)
  - Summer (DST): UTC+2 (CEST)
- Postal code: 8283
- Area code: 87

Káptalantóti is a village in Veszprém county, Hungary.
