= István Péter Németh =

Hungarian poet and literary historian (born 1960)

- Born: March 8, 1960; Tapolca, Hungary
- Occupations: poet, literary historian
- Website: www.nemethistvanpeter.hu

István Péter Németh (Hungarian: Németh István Péter) is a Hungarian poet and literary historian.

== Early life ==
Németh was born on 8 March 1960 in Tapolca, Hungary.

== Books, poem booklets ==
- Virágnyi világvég (versek, Budapest, 1987.)
- A szerepek hűsége (irodalmi tanulmányok, Veszprém, 1989.)
- Utak szeptembere (versek, Budapest, 1990.)
- Batsányiné Baumberg Gabriella versei (műfordítások, Tapolca, 1992.)
- …a természet örömkönnye (balatoni antológia, Vörösberény, 1993.)
- Koncz István Magamnak mondom című válogatott verseskötete (szerkesztette s gondozta - Tapolca, 1995.)
- Origósdi (mesék - Kamarás Istvánnal közösen - Tapolca, 1996.)
- Angyalvihánc Manophülében (gyermekversek, Tapolca, 1996.)
- Égi tetszésre - idelenn (a Balaton Akadémia könyvsorozatának repertóriuma, Vörösberény, 1996.)
- Heine-daloskönyv (Tapolca, 1997.)
- A boglári parton Adalékok Balatonboglár irodalom és művelődéstörténetéhez. Balaton Akadémia könyvek (szerkesztette - 1998.)
- Borággal áldlak - magyar bordaloskönyv - Balaton Akadémia könyvek (szerkesztette - 1999.)
- Pannónia dicsérete - előadások a II. magyar írók, műfordítók világtalálkozóján Balaton Akadémia könyvek (szerkesztette - 1999.)
- Kamarás István: Világverseny a berekben Németh István Péter verseivel (Cicero Könyvkiadó, 1999.)
- Herbert Zinkl: Esőének (műfordítások, Balatonfüred, 1999.)
- Koldus és királyfi (meseopera-librettó, Balatonfüred, 2000.)
- 100 vers (versek, Tapolca, 2000.)
- Kihullt lapok egy naplóból (naplók, följegyzések, Baláca Könyvek, Veszprém, 2000.)
- Rilke-képeskönyv (műfordítások, Balatonfüred, 2000.)
- Gyöngytár és teklatéka (versek, Tapolca, 2001.)
- Egry ragyogása (versantológia a magyar költők Egry Józsefhez írott verseiből, Balatonőszöd, 2001.)
- Karácsonyi irka (versek és műfordítások, Zánka, 2001.)
- Janus-irka Janus Pannonius 50 epigrammája NIP műfordításában/átköltésében

== DVDs ==
- Öleljen Föld, víz s ég! (balatoni irka Nagy Gáspár emlékének, 2007.)
- Megtaláljon a Karácsony! (karácsonyi versek orgonás zenei aláfestéssel, 2007.)
- Húsvéti oratórium (húsvéti verses DVD, 2008.)
- Angyalvihánc Manophülében (gyermekversek, 2008.)

== Recognition ==
- Egry József országos pályázat, II. hely - Badacsony, 1976.
- Egry József országos pályázat, I.hely - Badacsony, 1977.
- Baraxa-Soós Alapítvány díja, 1985.
- FMK országos versíró pályázat, Bp., I. hely
- B.A.Z. megye jubileumi irodalmi pályázat, Miskolc, 1987., III. hely
- IRAT irodalmi nívódíj első verses kötetéért, Bp., 1989.
- Pedagógusként végzett önképzéséért Fonay-díj, Veszprém, 1990.
- Az Élet és Irodalom bordalversenye, III. díj, Budapest, 1992.
- Salvatore Quasimodo költői verseny, különdíj, Balatonfüred, 1994.
- Salvatore Quasimodo költői versenyben a legjobb 12 között, 1998.
- Országos Illyés Gyula-pályázat a költő 100. születésnapján. Magyar Kultúra Háza, Bp., Corvin tér. Tanulmánya a legjobb 10 között, a Móricz Zsigmond Társaság különdíja, 2002.
- A "Tapolca városért" kitüntetettje, 2001.

== Notable citations ==
- Lurkós líra, mackós poézis
- Németh István Péter - Költészet napi Könyvszemle
- Gyöngytár és teklatéka
- Gondolatok Németh István Péter Mit hoztál – Tűnődések a tájhazáról című könyvének olvasása közben
- Remény, kézírásban

Beyond journal articles on the works of Németh, several citations appear also on the internet, e.g. Arácsi anakreon, Balatoni haikuk, or A műfordítás fényűzése .

== Media appearances ==
- Szijártó J (22 April 2010). "Visszahúzódni jött ide. Rubin Szilárd író a tapolcai költő szemével". Veszprém Megyei NAPLÓ.
- Meiszterics E (18 May 2010). "Hazalátogatott Háromfára Kerék Imre költő". Somogyi Hírlap.
