= Tapolca =

- Town
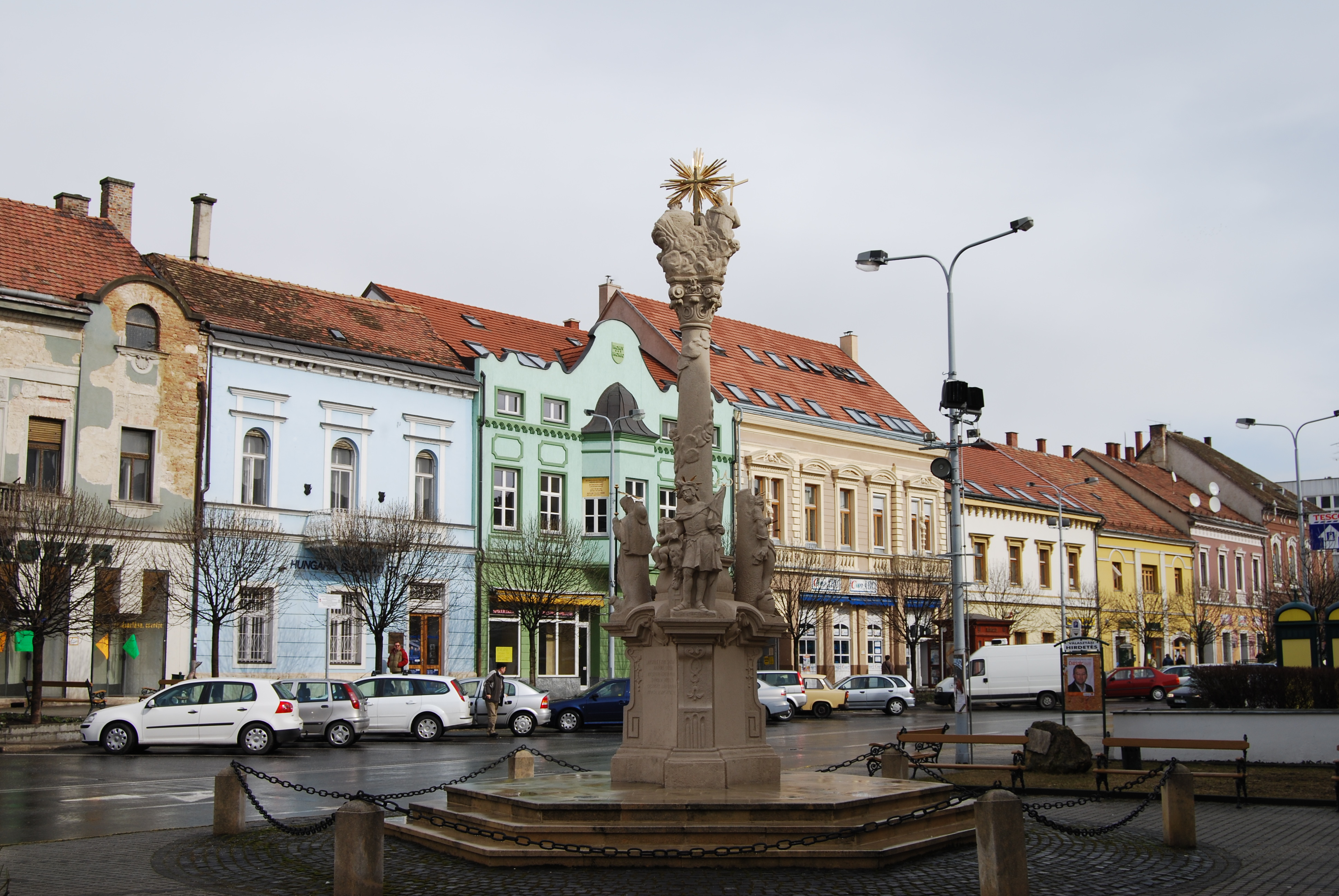
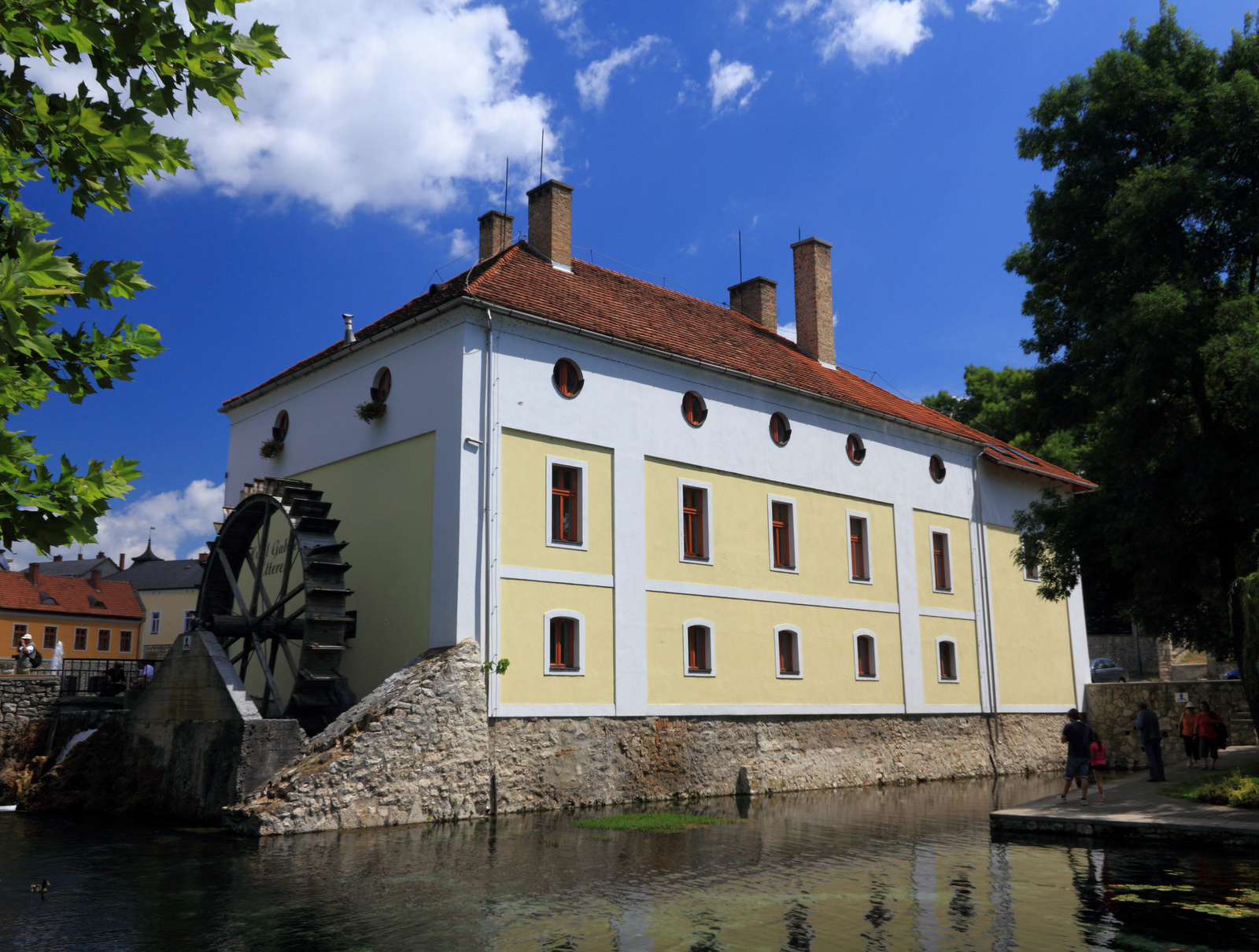
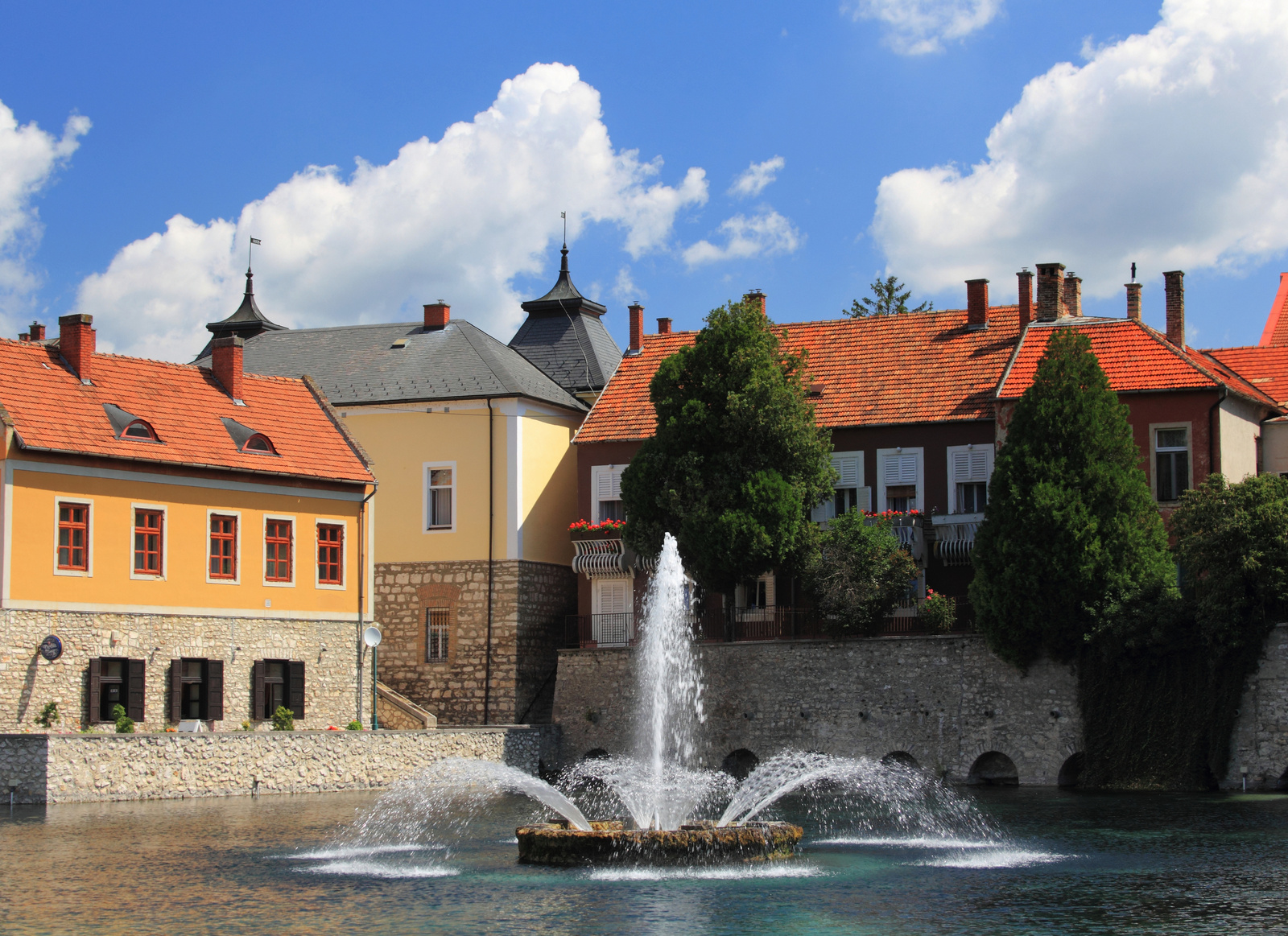

- Flag Coat of arms

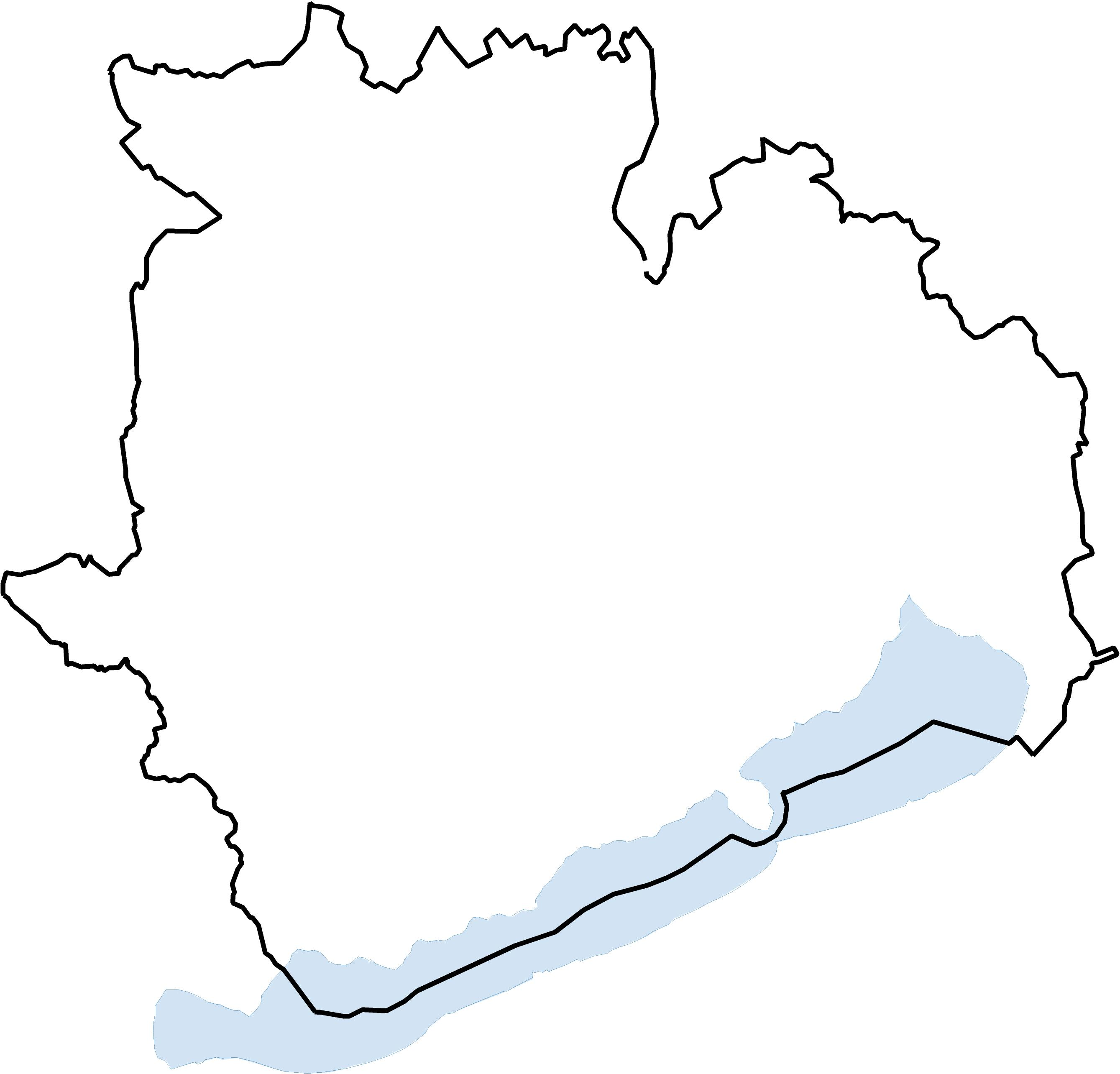
- Location of Tapolca Tapolca (Hungary)
- Coordinates: 46°52′58″N 17°24′29″E
- Country: Hungary
- County: Veszprém

Area
  - Total: 63.48 km^{2} (24.51 sq mi)

Population (2010)
  - Total: 16,035
  - Density: 279.43/km^{2} (723.7/sq mi)
- Time zone: UTC+1 (CET)
  - Summer (DST): UTC+2 (CEST)
- Postal code: 8300
- Area code: 87

Tapolca (Hungarian: ['tɒpolt͡sɒ]; German: Toppoltz) is a town in Veszprém County, Hungary, close to Lake Balaton. It is located at around 46°52′58″N 17°26′29″E. The town has an outer suburb, Tapolca-Diszel, approximately 5 km to the East.

== Etymology ==
The origin of Tapolca is disputed, originating either from the Hungarian Tapolcza, meaning "high place", or from the Slavic Toplica/Teplica meaning "hot springs". It was also known as Turul or Turultapolca at some points in the Middle Ages.

== Notable sights ==
=== The Lake Cave ===
This 3 km long lake cave system is situated in the heart of the town. It was opened to the public in 1912, ten years after its discovery. Small boats can be hired to explore the cave system. At 15–20 m below the town, a 5 km long cave system criss-crosses the Miocene limestone layers. This includes the 3.3 km long Lake Cave, which is mostly filled with karst water. The cave was discovered in 1903 during well digging. Thanks to these explorations, round boat trips were made possible from 1937. Because of its special origin and unique formations, it was designated a protected area in 1942 and placed under strict protection in 1982. The mixture of the cold karst water flowing there and the thermal water up-surging from the deep dissolves limestone. Initially narrow passages, then smaller and larger niches were formed. Over a very long period, these widened into spacious chambers and passages. Dripstones have not developed in the cave, as several metre thick clay deposits prevents infiltration from the surface. Only calcareous formations (cave corals and aragonite crystals) occur at some places, having precipitated from the cave air. Bats cannot enter the closed spaces, so the largest vertebrate is a 10 cm long fish, the Common minnow (Phoxinus phoxinus L.), which probably swims in through the wet passages from the Malom-tó (Mill Pond). The cave air, with nearly 100% humidity, a high calcium content and a constant temperature of 20 °C, is used to cure respiratory diseases in the branches under the town hospital that are in close proximity with the cave. The radon content of the cave air is too low to have any effect on the visitors.

=== Mill Pond ===
A romantic part of the town is the Mill Pond (Malom-tó). The Upper Pond can be reached from the Main Square through a small backyard where the "Four Seasons", a sculpture by László Marton, is situated.

=== Garden of Ruins ===
The Church Hill is the medieval centre of Tapolca. The church was built in the 13th century in Roman style. During the 14th century it was finished as Gothic church. After the Ottoman invasion, it was rebuilt in Baroque style in 1756.

=== School Museum ===
The School Museum is located in the former cantor house. The greatest pedagogic collection of the Transdanubian region can be found there.

=== Main Square ===
The former marketplace of the town, the Main Square, functioned as a trade centre from ancient times. The statue of Holy Trinity was erected in the middle of the square in 1757. Another masterpiece, the Little Princess, is located there too.

Population

== Notable inhabitants ==
- János Batsányi (1763–1845), poet, philosopher
- József Cserhát, poet, writer, editor
- László Marton (1925–2008), sculptor
- József Csermák (1932–2001) athlete, (hammer-throwing gold medal 1952. Helsinki)
- István Péter Németh (born 1960), poet, literary historian
- Pál Sümegi (born 1960), associate professor
- Gábor Boczkó (born 1977), fencer
- Vera Tóth (born 1985), singer, the winner of the Hungarian Megasztár 2004
- Gabi Tóth (born 1988), singer, younger sister of Vera Tóth

== Twin towns – sister cities ==
Tapolca is twinned with:

- Este, Italy
- Lempäälä, Finland
- Ružinov (Bratislava), Slovakia
- Stadthagen, Germany
- Sümeg, Hungary
- Zăbala, Romania

== Gallery ==
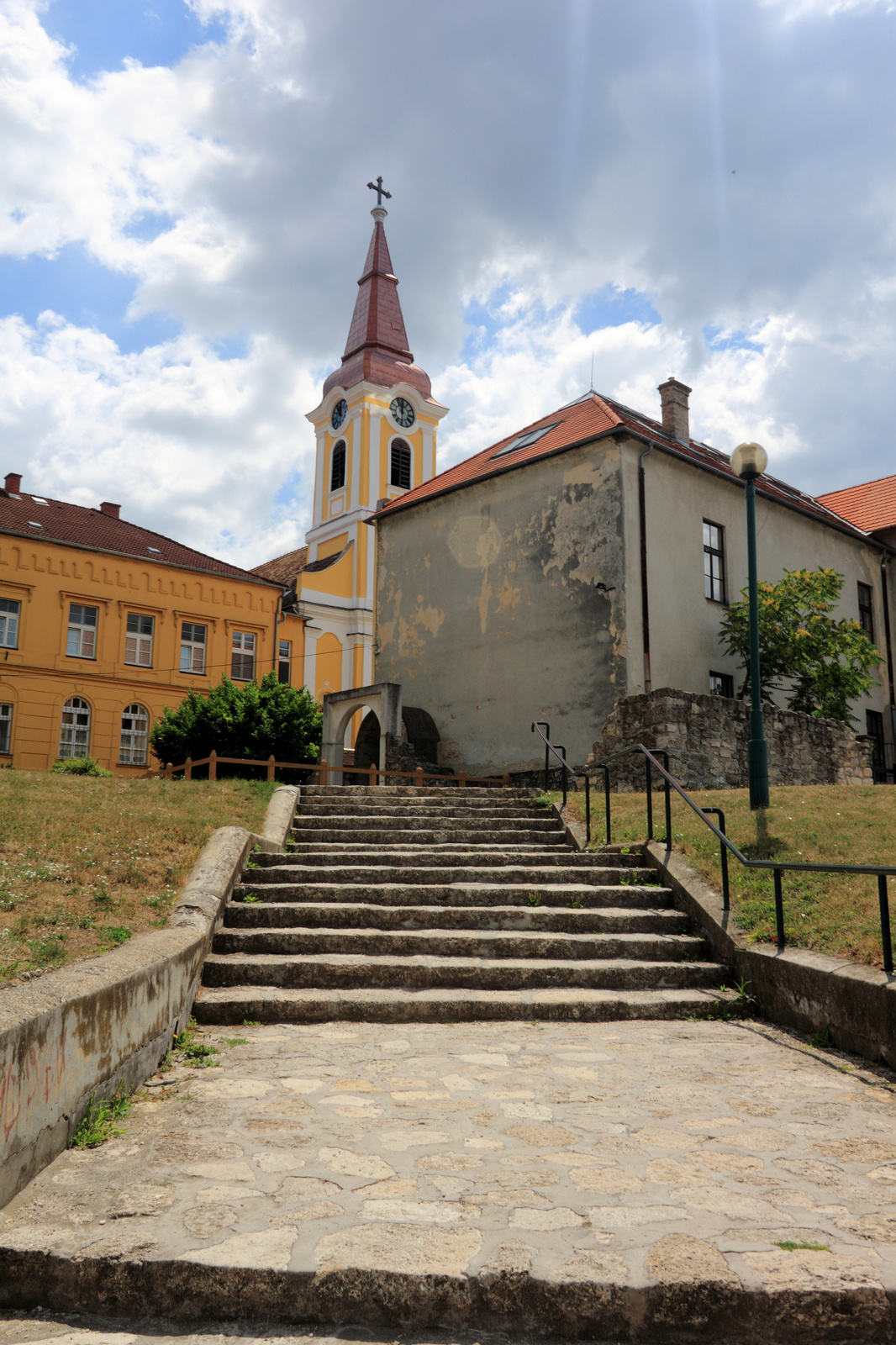
Roman Catholic Church

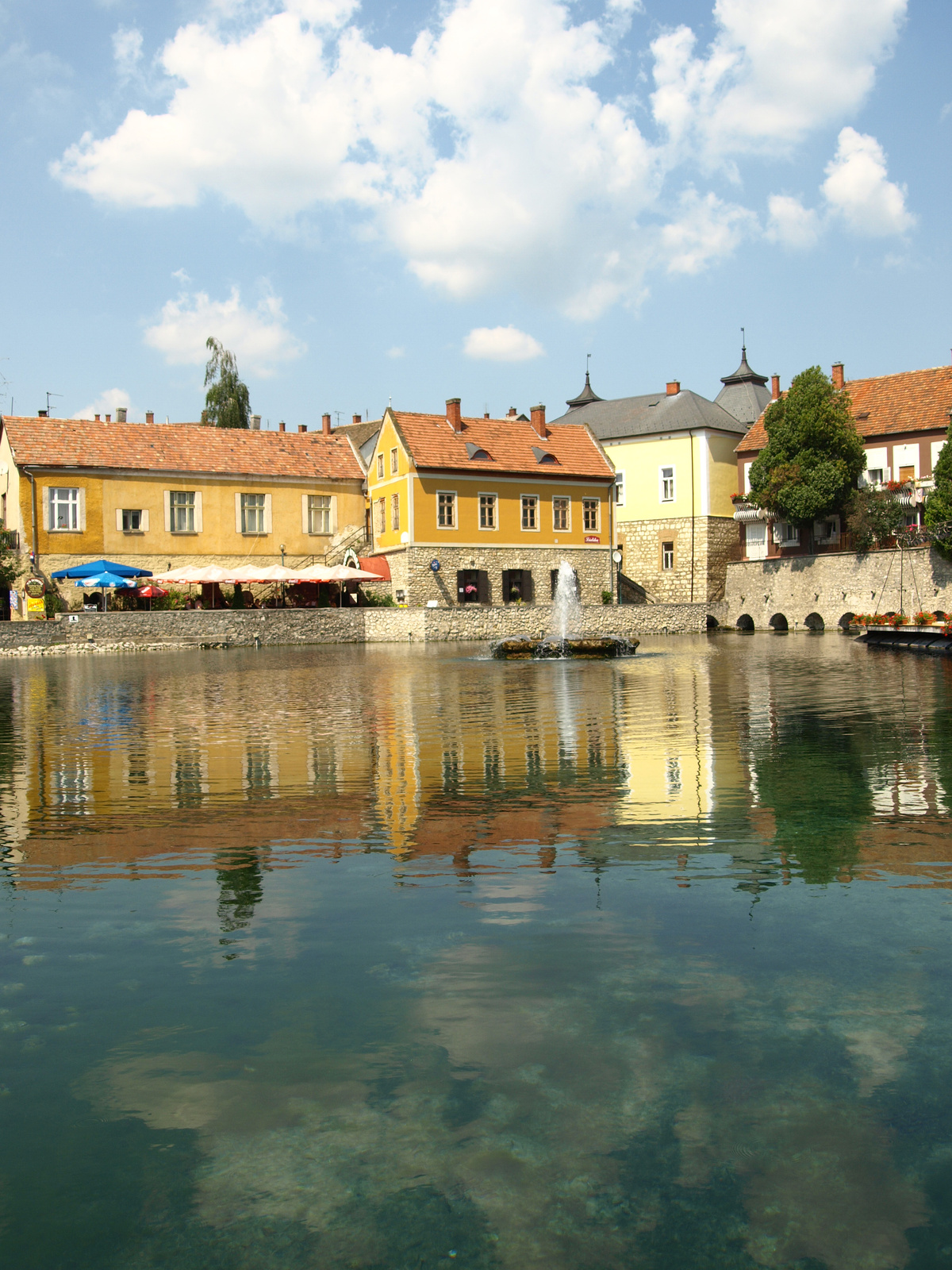
The Lake Malom

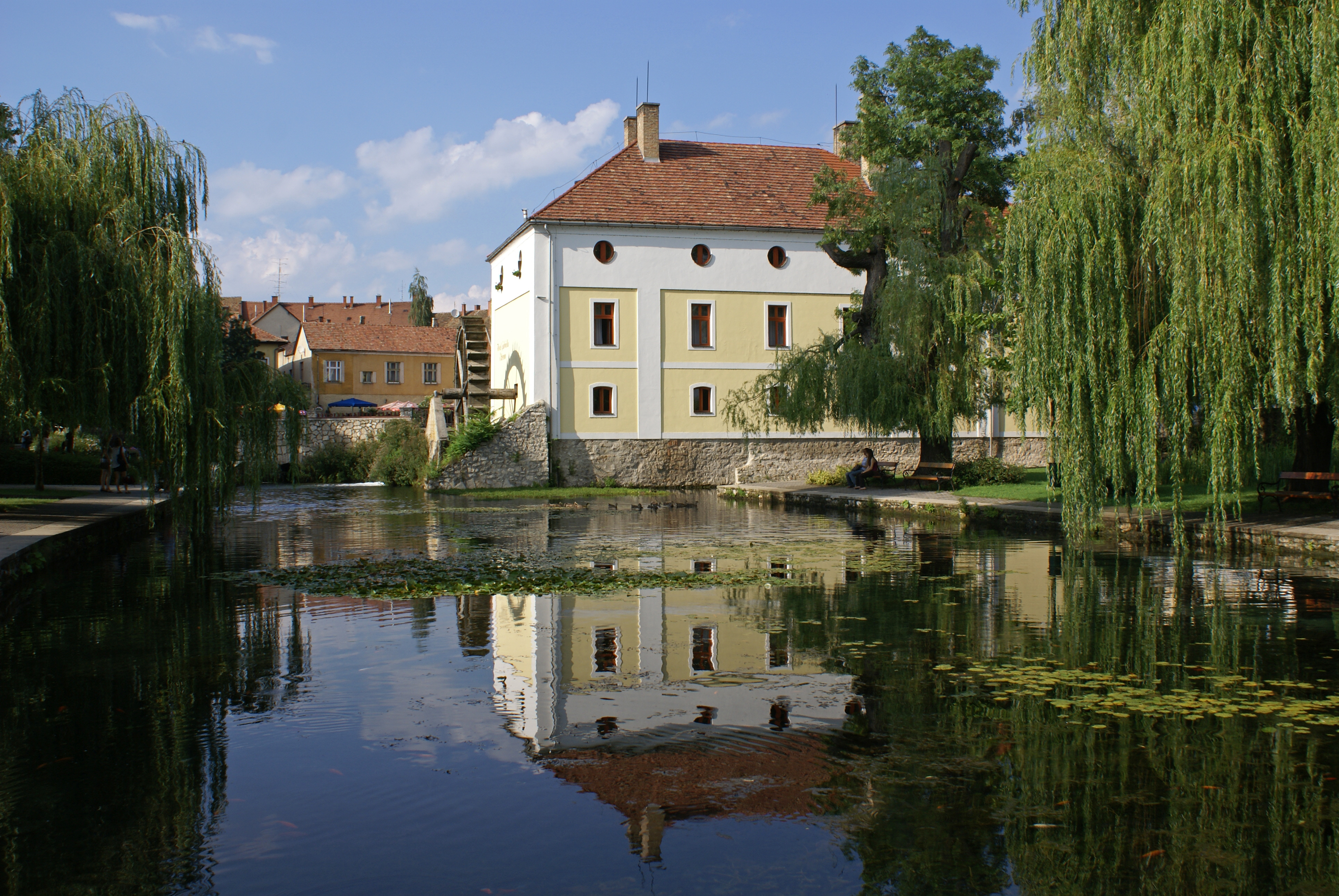
The Watermill of Tapolca

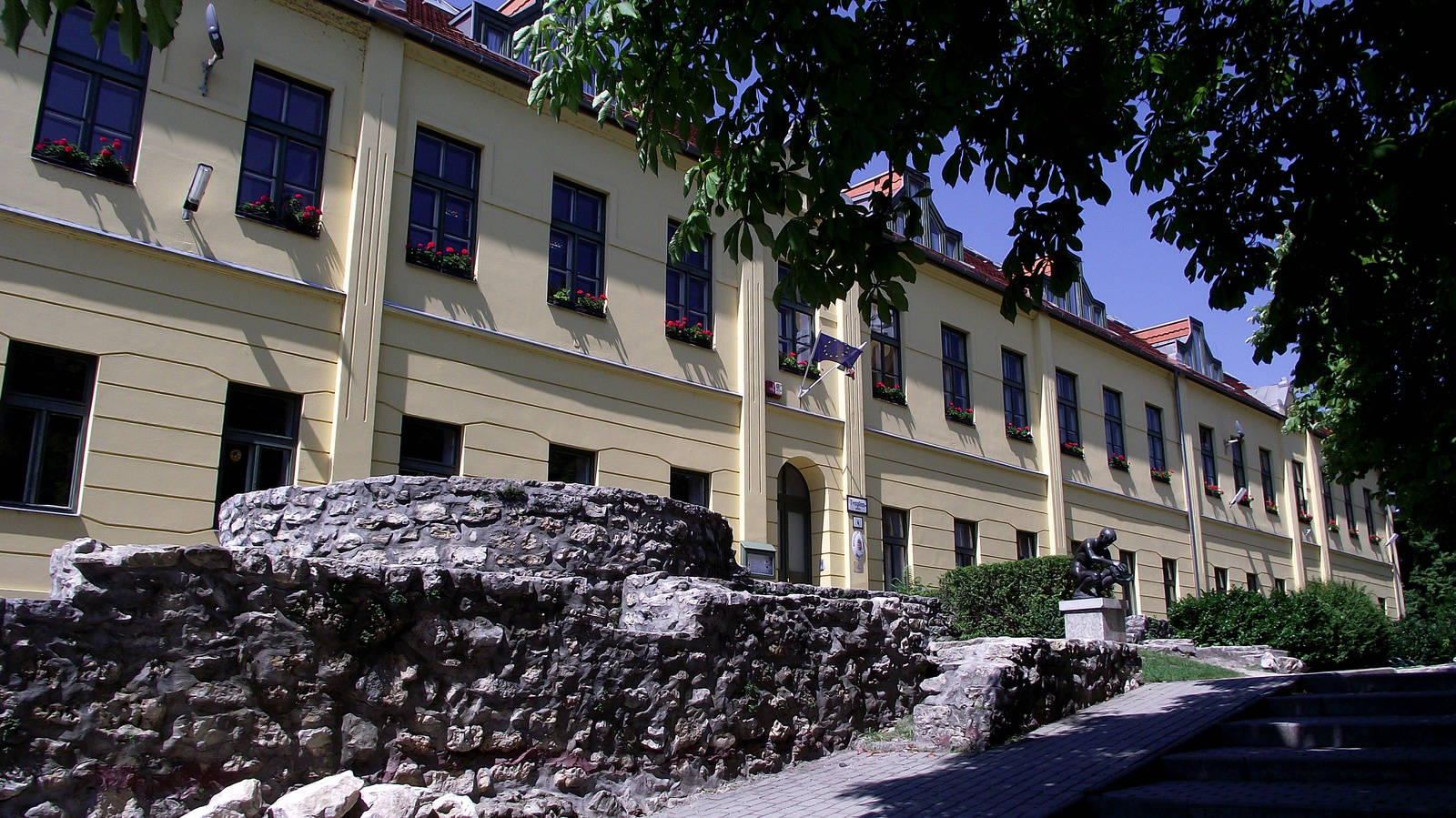
Parish house

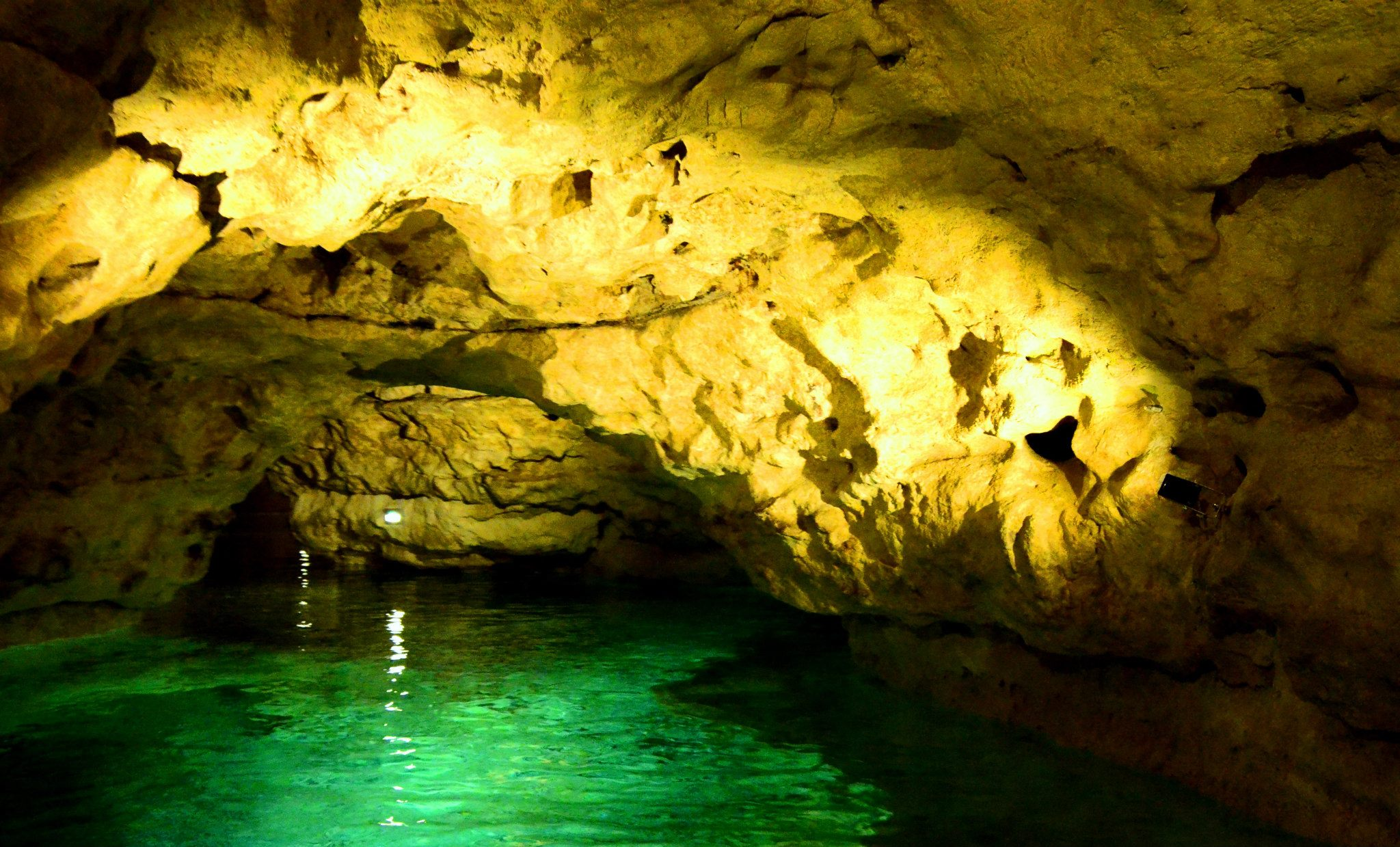
View of Lake Cave

== Sport ==
Tapolcai Bauxitbányász SE was the town's association football club. Their biggest achievement was winning the 1983–84 Nemzeti Bajnokság III season.
