= László Marton (sculptor) =

Hungarian sculptor

- Born: November 5, 1925
- Died: October 5, 2008 (aged 82)
- Known for: Sculptor
- Notable work: Little Princess Statue
- Awards: Kossuth Prize
- Website: Web site László Marton

László Marton (5 November 1925 – 5 October 2008) was a Munkácsy and Kossuth Prize-winning Hungarian sculptor from Budapest, Hungary. The original 50 centimetres (20 in) statuette of the Little Princess Statue sitting on the railings of the Danube promenade in Budapest, Hungary was created by him.

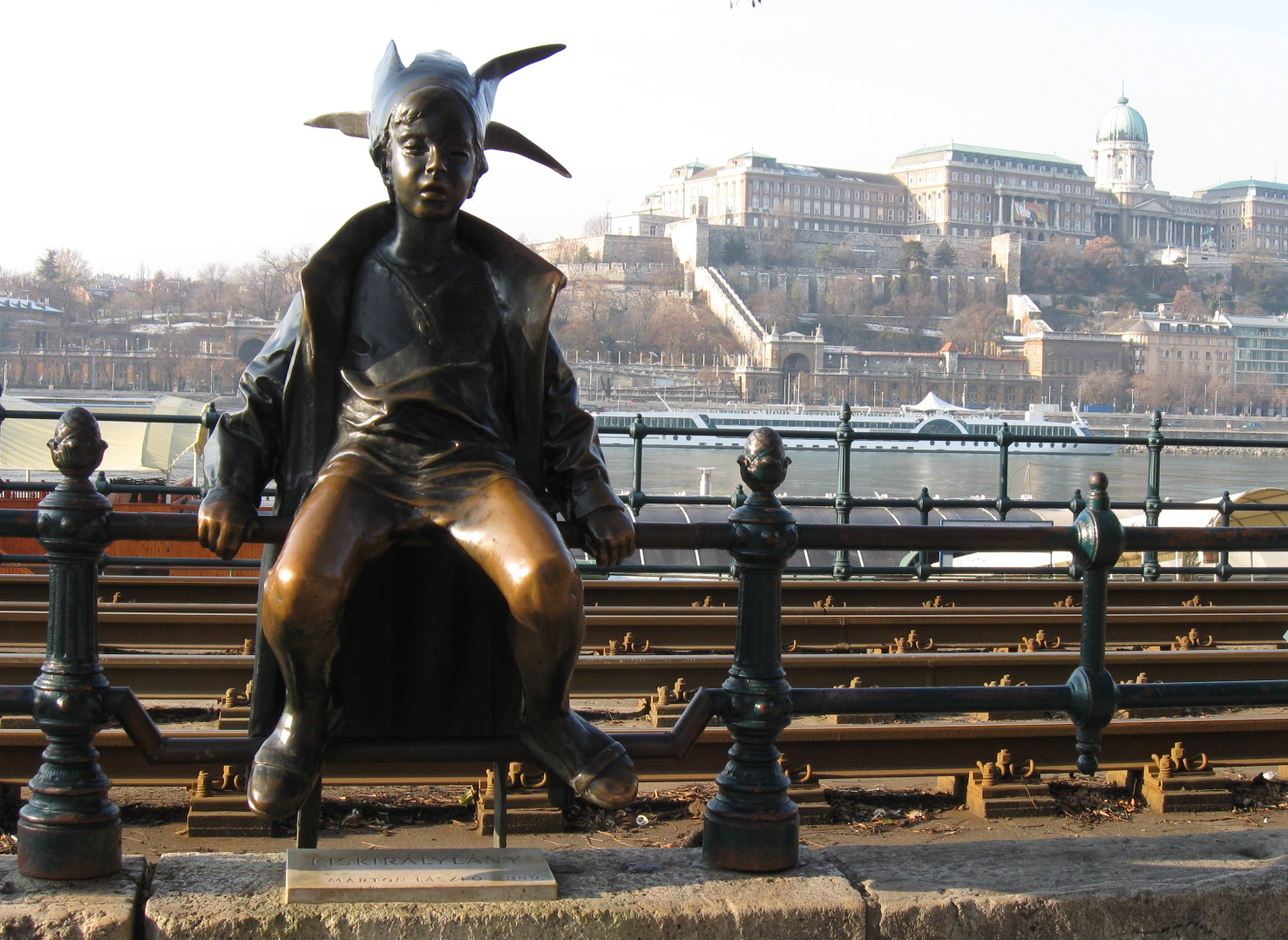
Little Princess (Kiskirálylány)
