= Balaton Uplands National Park =

National park of Hungary

Coordinates: 46.9758°N 17.9294°E

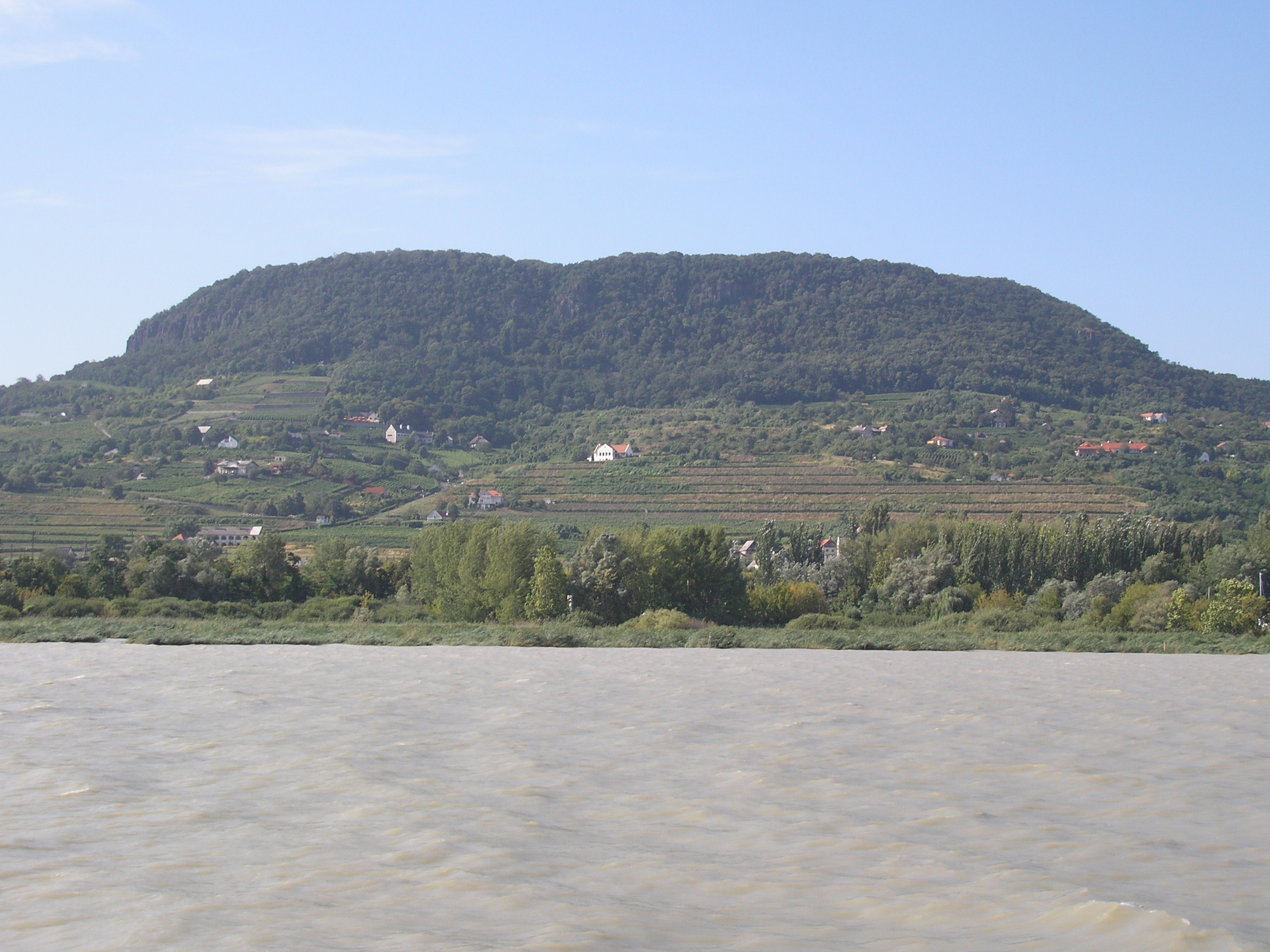
Badacsonytomaj

In 1997 a protected ecological system embracing the adjoining area of the Balaton Uplands (the northern shore of Lake Balaton, Hungary) was established with the connection of the already protected areas which had been separate for a long time. The area of 56,997 hectares of the Balaton-felvidéki national park mainly consists of these six landscape protection areas. The national park is headquartered in Veszprém, the largest city of the Balaton area.

== Tihany Peninsula ==
In 1952 the first protected landscape area of Hungary was created in the most attractive, most varied and scientifically best researched area of the country. It covers 1, 562 hectares, of which 195 is highly protected. The staff of the Hungarian Balaton Limnological Research Institute - founded in 1927 in Tihany - not only studied the biology of the lake, but also did extensive research on the peninsula of Tihany. As a result, hundreds of publications have dealt with its geology, fauna and flora. All the research supported the idea of granting protection to this area.

== Pécselyi Basin ==
The gently sloping hillsides, wide mountaintops and basins, flat highlands with spotted karstic elements (e.g. karren fields) characterize the area. A relict of the basalt volcanic activities in the Quaternary is the Halom Hill at Mencshely.

== Káli Basin ==
The most characteristic part of the Balaton Uplands was granted protection - perhaps at the last moment - when a protected landscape area in the Káli Basin was established in 1984 on an area of 9,111 hectares.

== Tapolca Basin ==
For hundreds of years poets, novelists and painters have been calling the Badacsony and its vicinity the most beautiful landscape in Hungary. One of the greatest achievements of the Hungarian nature conservation movement is that the basalt quarries opened here in 1903 have finally been closed down. The playwright Ferenc Herczeg made powerful efforts in the Upper House in the 1920s to have them closed. A press campaign was also launched, but the last quarries were finally closed in no sooner than 1964. Those on the Gulács and Tóti Hills were abandoned at the end of World War II and in the early 1950s. The Szentgyörgy and Csobánc Hills are more fortunate: their basalt was not found suitable for building purposes, so there are only small wounds on their flanks.

== Keszthely Mountains ==
The characteristic bedrock of the forested area is dolomite. On this bedrock typical for the Transdanubian Mountains, the flora and fauna are determined by the special ecological conditions.

== Kis-Balaton ==
The Kis Balaton, as a huge wetland habitat is unique in the whole of Europe, which is why it has always been recorded by international nature conservation. Its wonderful world of birds was already famous in the last century; and has survived despite the draining of the marsh started in 1922. It is therefore not surprising that when Hungary joined the Ramsar Convention in 1979, the Kis Balaton was included in the list of "Wetlands of International Importance as Waterfowl Habitat".

== Gallery ==
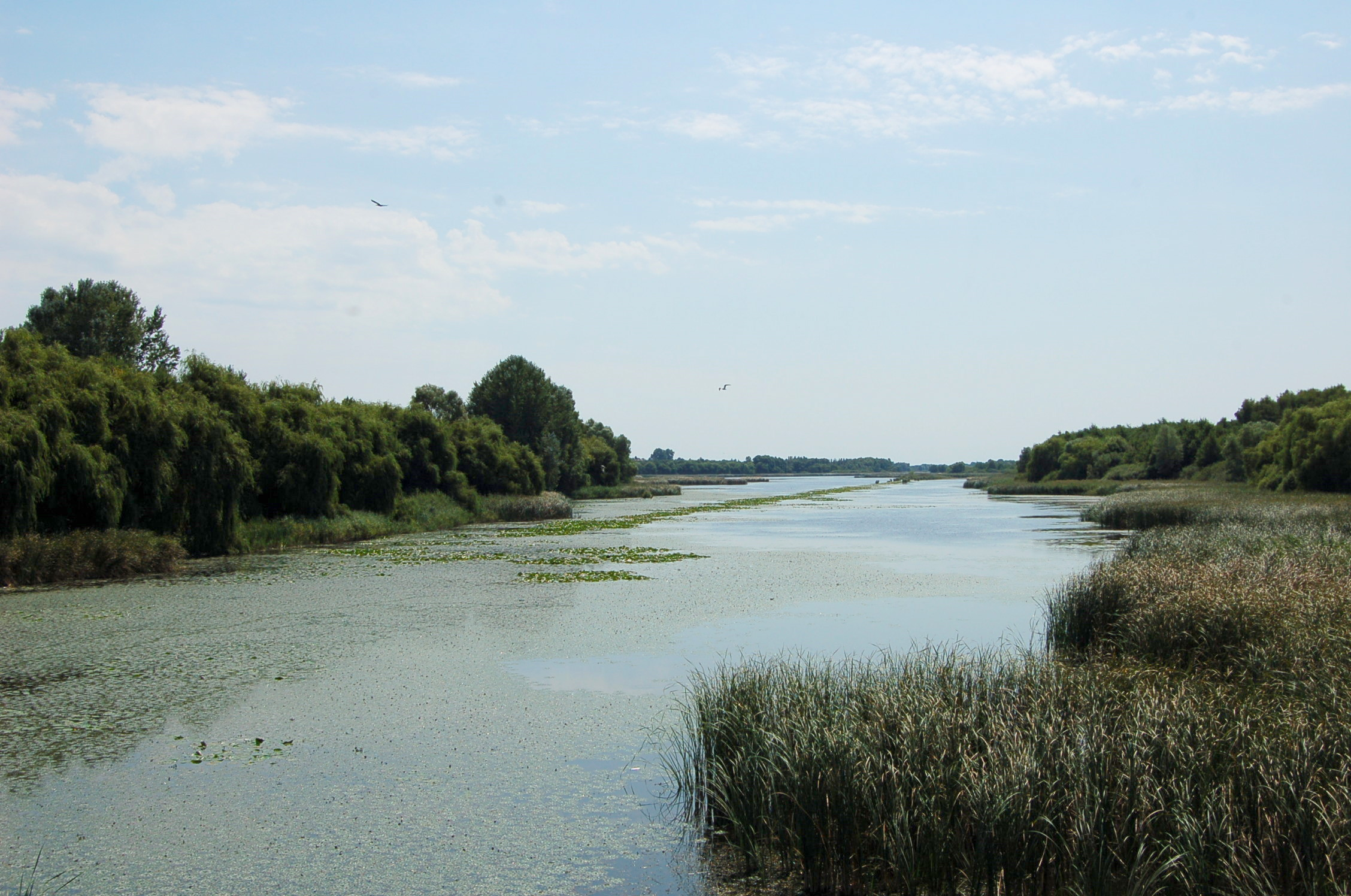
Kis-Balaton

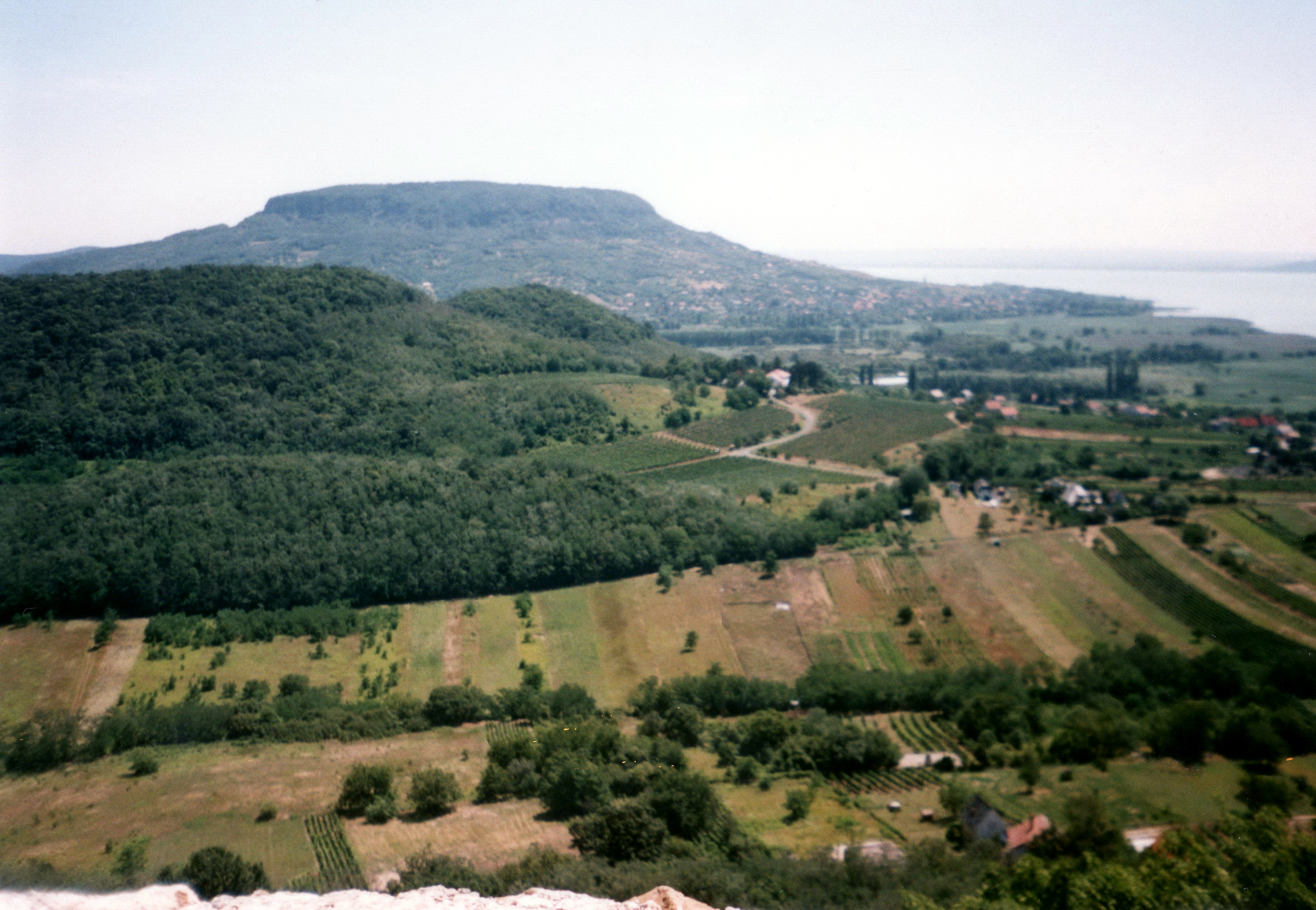
Badacsony

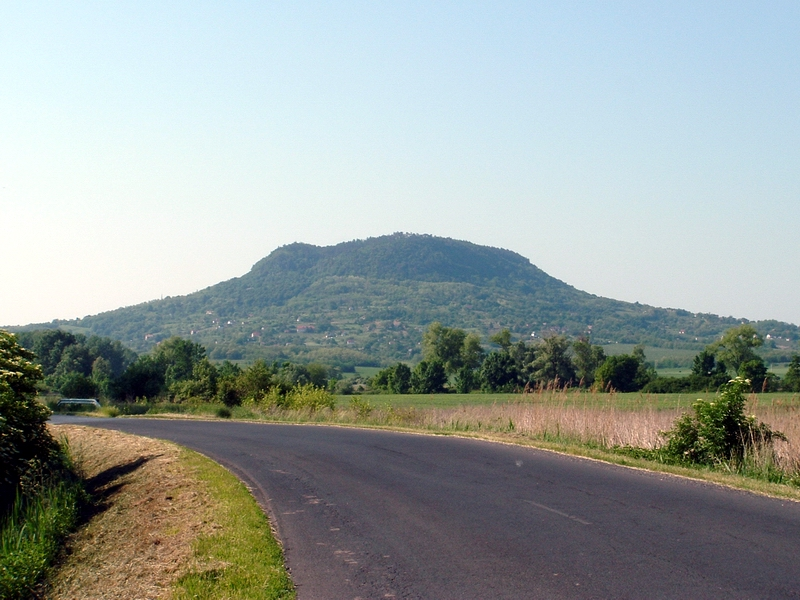
Szent-György Mountain

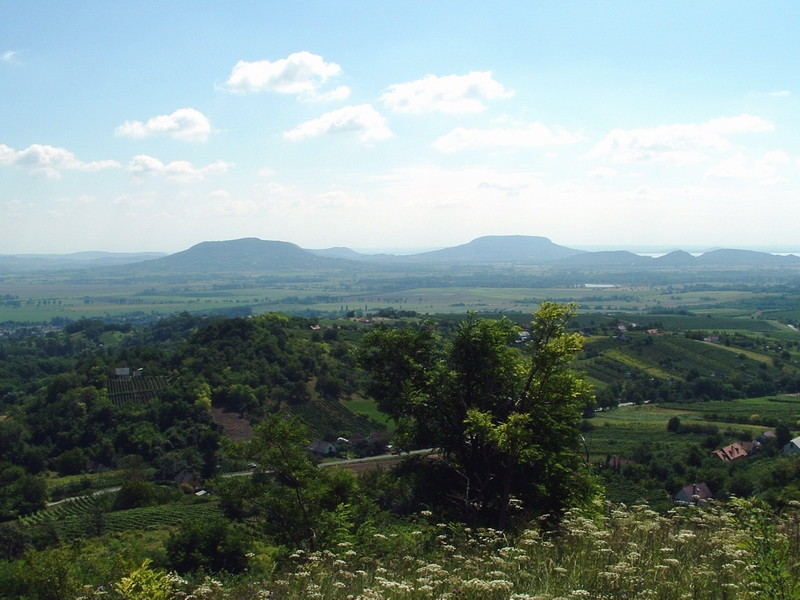
Tapolca Basin

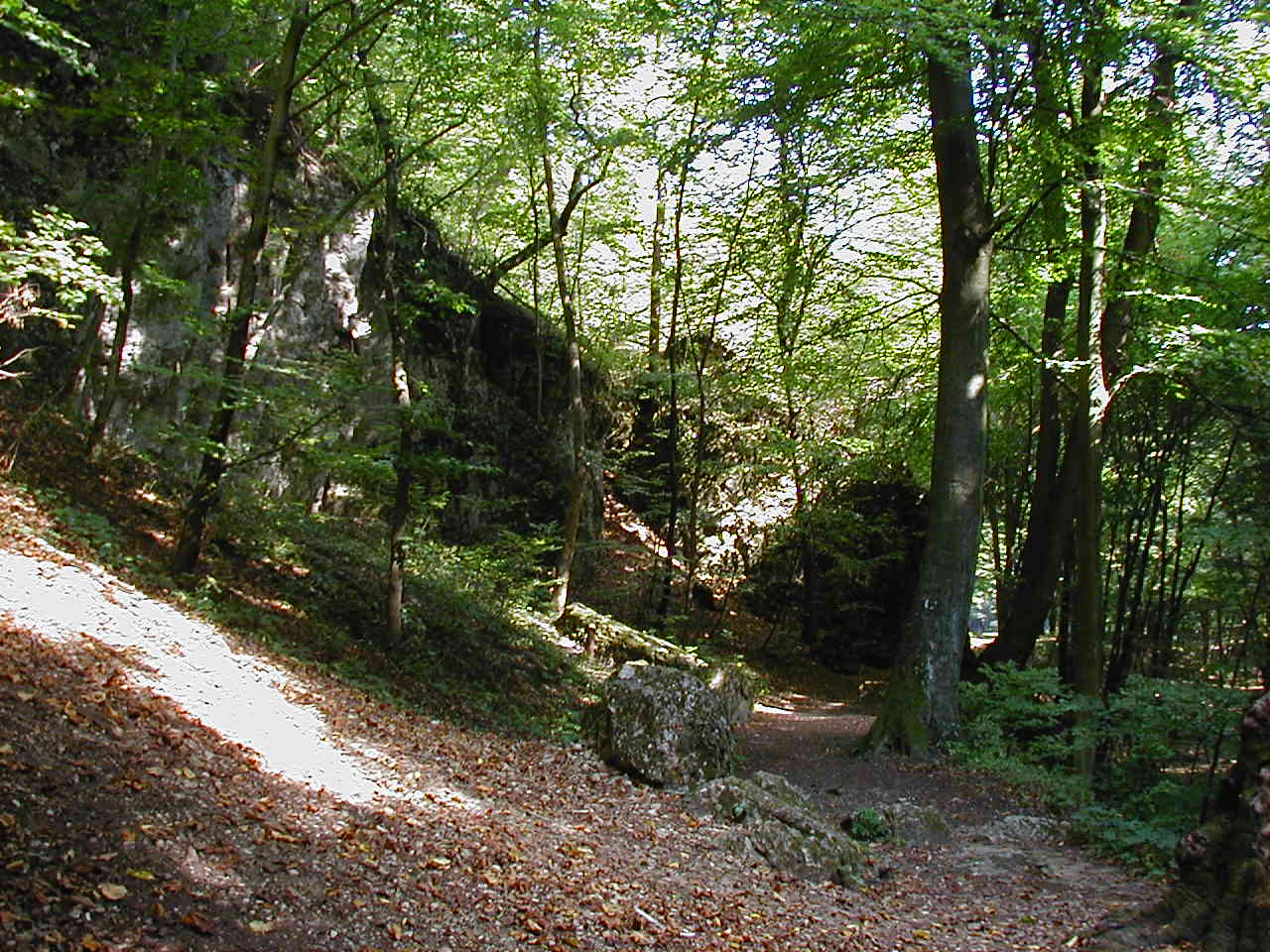
Cuha valley in the Bakony Mountains

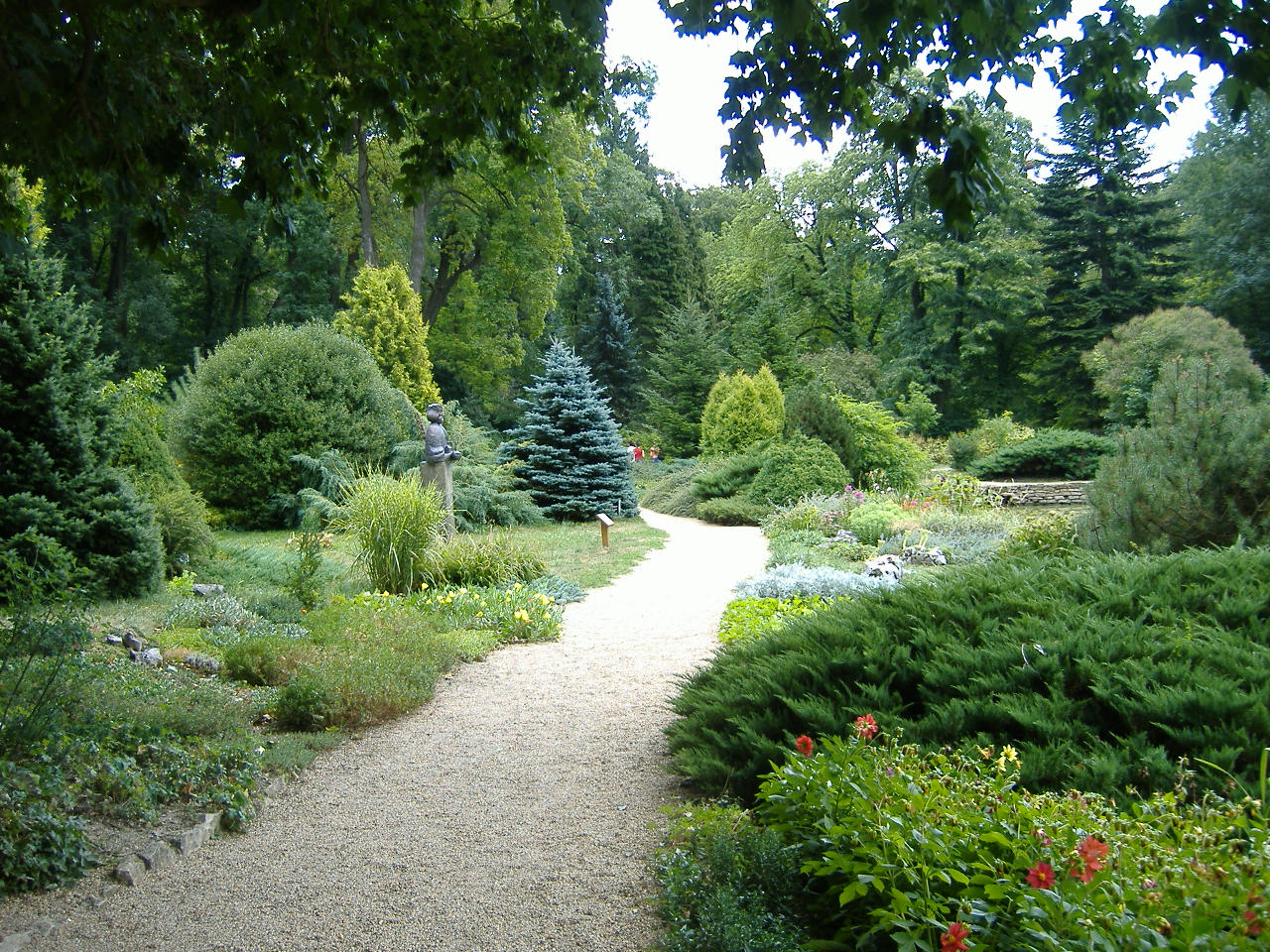
Arboretum of Zirc

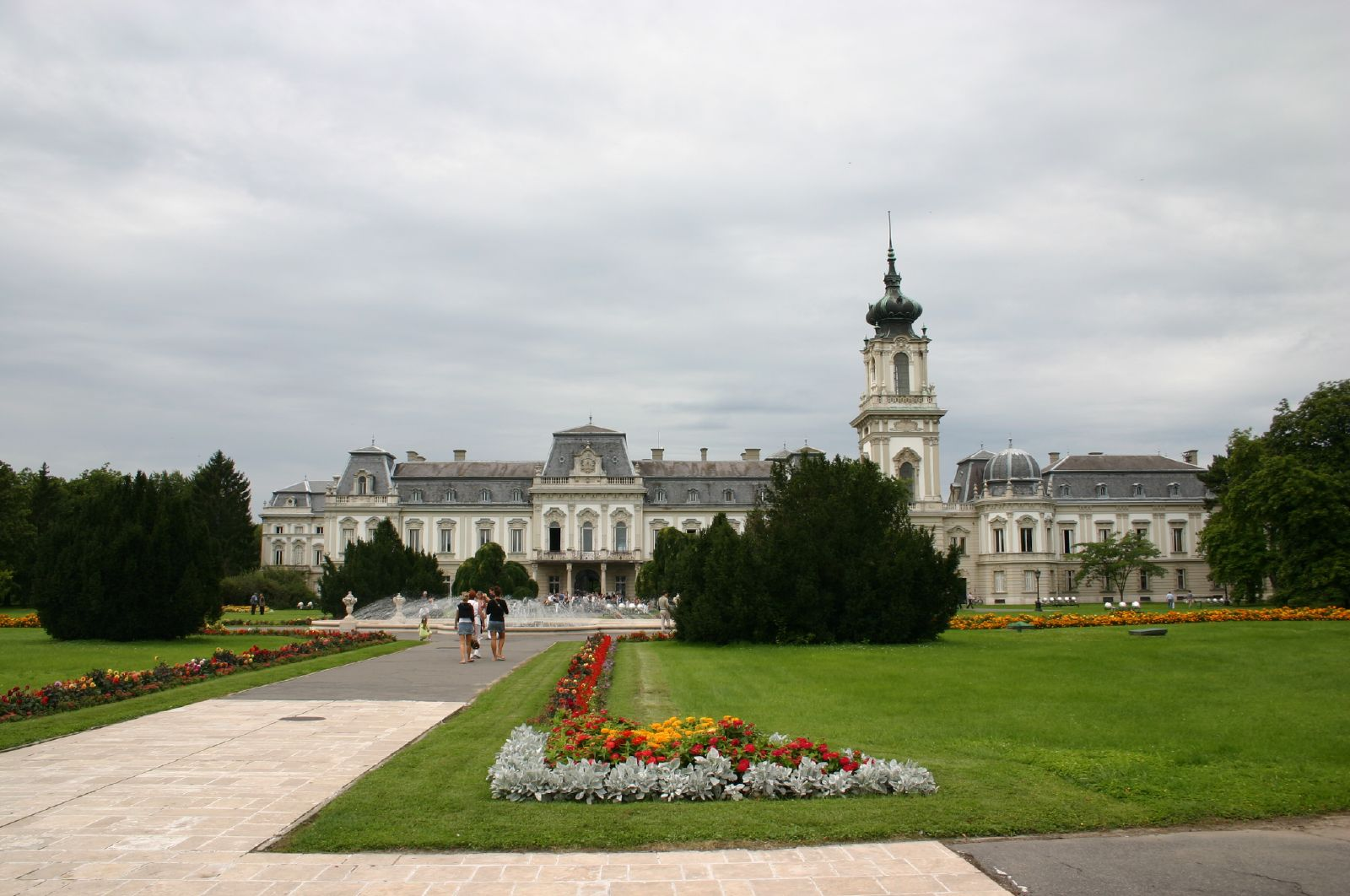
Castle Festetics in Keszthely

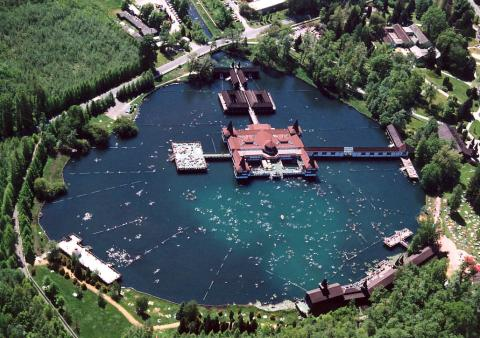
Lake Hévíz

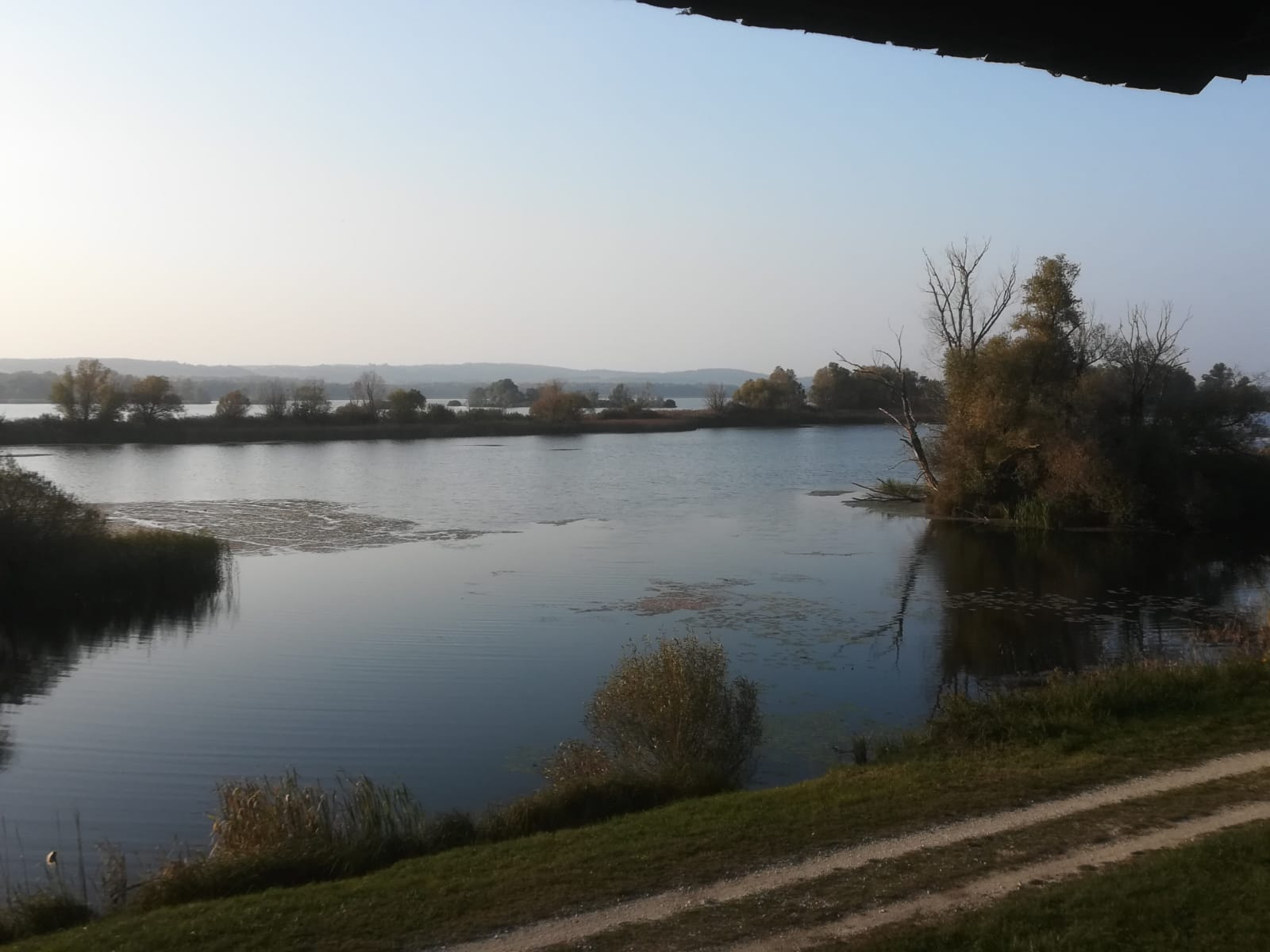
View of the Kis-Balaton

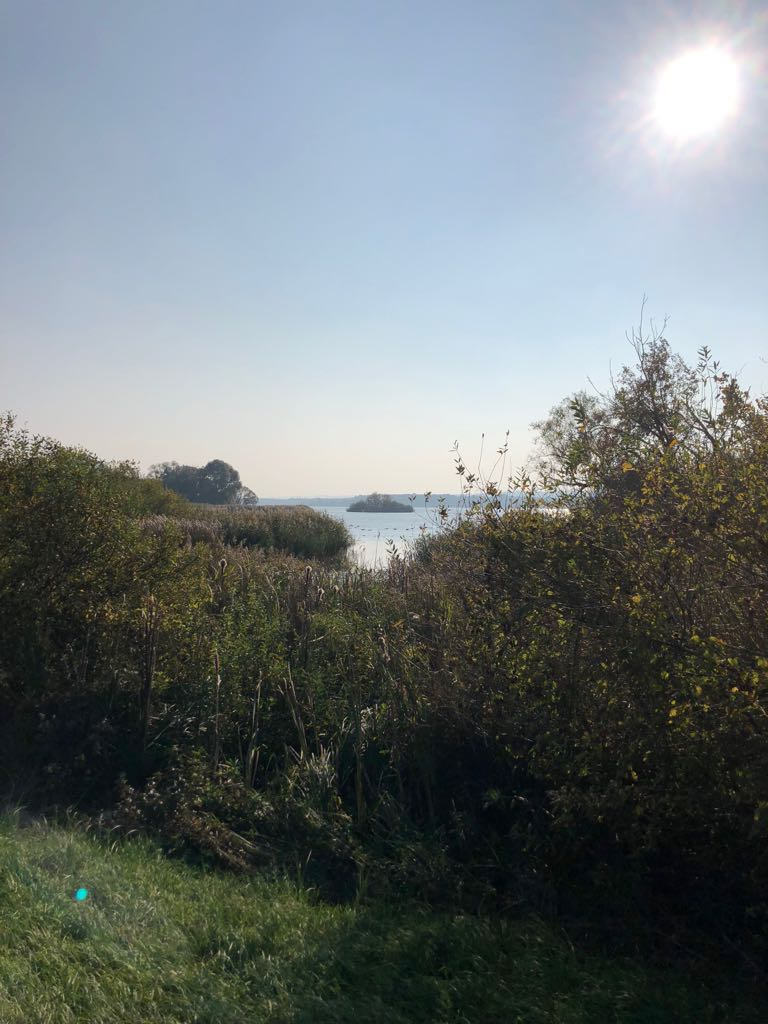
View of the Kis-Balaton

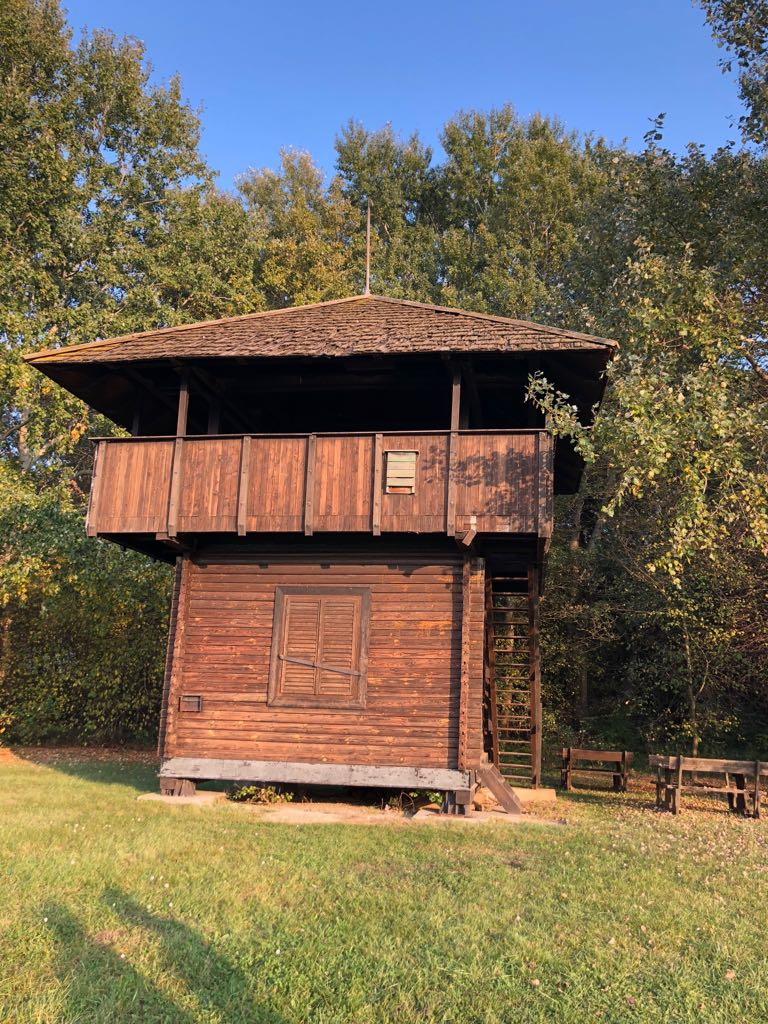
Hut next to Kis-Balaton
