= Funerary architecture of Budapest =

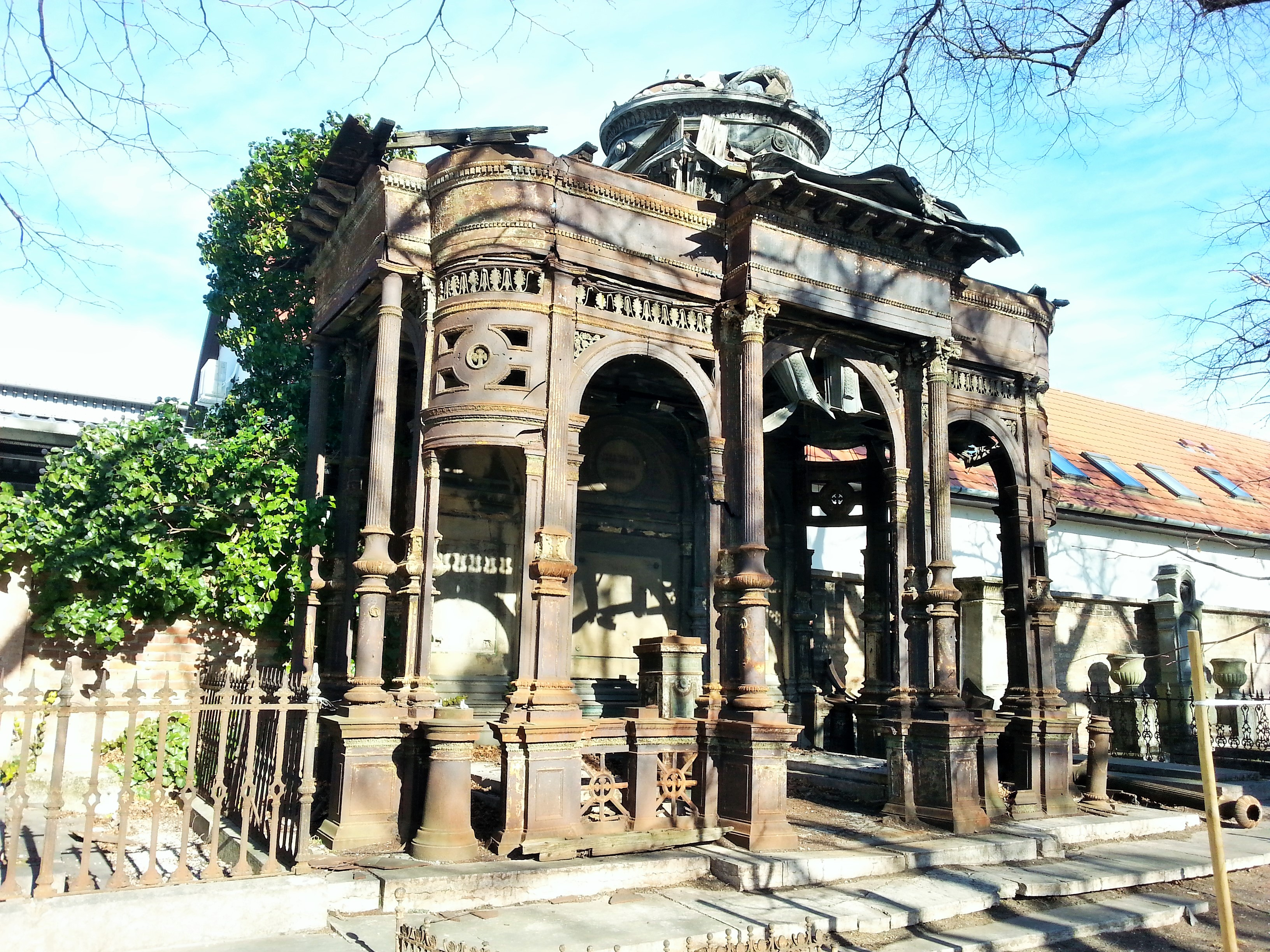
Lyka-mausoleum, Fiumei út cemetery

The following article presents the funerary architecture of Budapest, the capital of Hungary.

== Smaller tombstones ==
There are many types of tombstones in Budapest cemeteries, with different architectural solutions. Simple grave markers (crosses, headstones, headstones) are the simplest, with minimal architectural training, they are usually made by tombstone carvers / wood carvers. Grave monuments that also contain statues are more complicated than them, here mainly the sculptural works can be classified as artistic tasks. Tombstone art developed in the 19th century and was dominant until the first half of the 20th century - usually in the case of wealthier people and families.

One of the common types of family tombs are wall tombs and crypts, where – regardless of the upper structure – there is a large stone masonry cavity below the surface, which is not filled with earth.

The next level is the stele and the larger obelisk-like tomb, here we can already speak of a significant size of several meters, although the obelisk can still be classified as one of the simpler architectural works. It is similar to the stele-like tomb. Sometimes an empty artificial sarcophagus was created on top.

In the gallery below, only grave monuments with architectural training are presented:

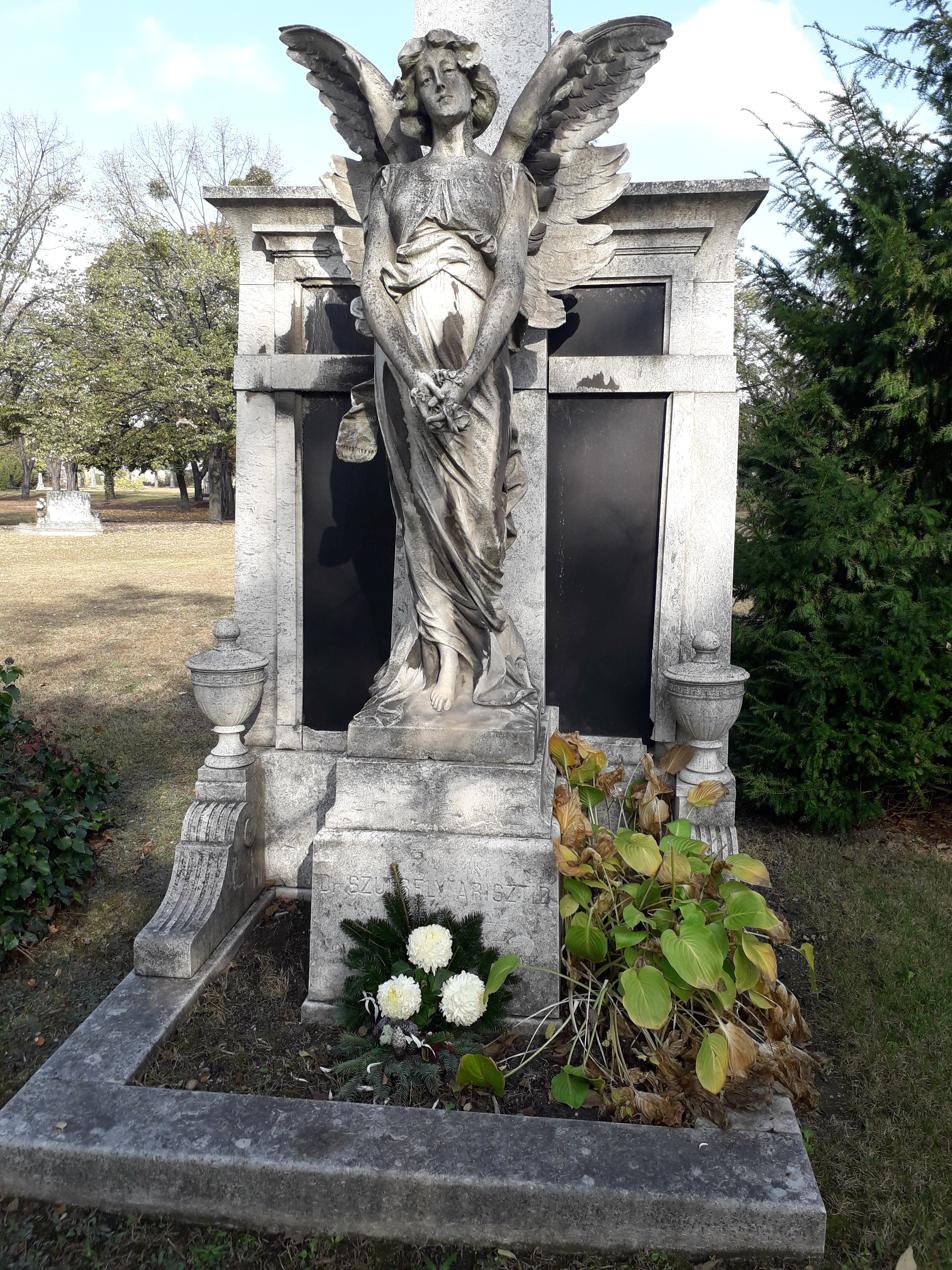
Tomb with angel statue (Aristid Szutrely), Fiumei út cemetery

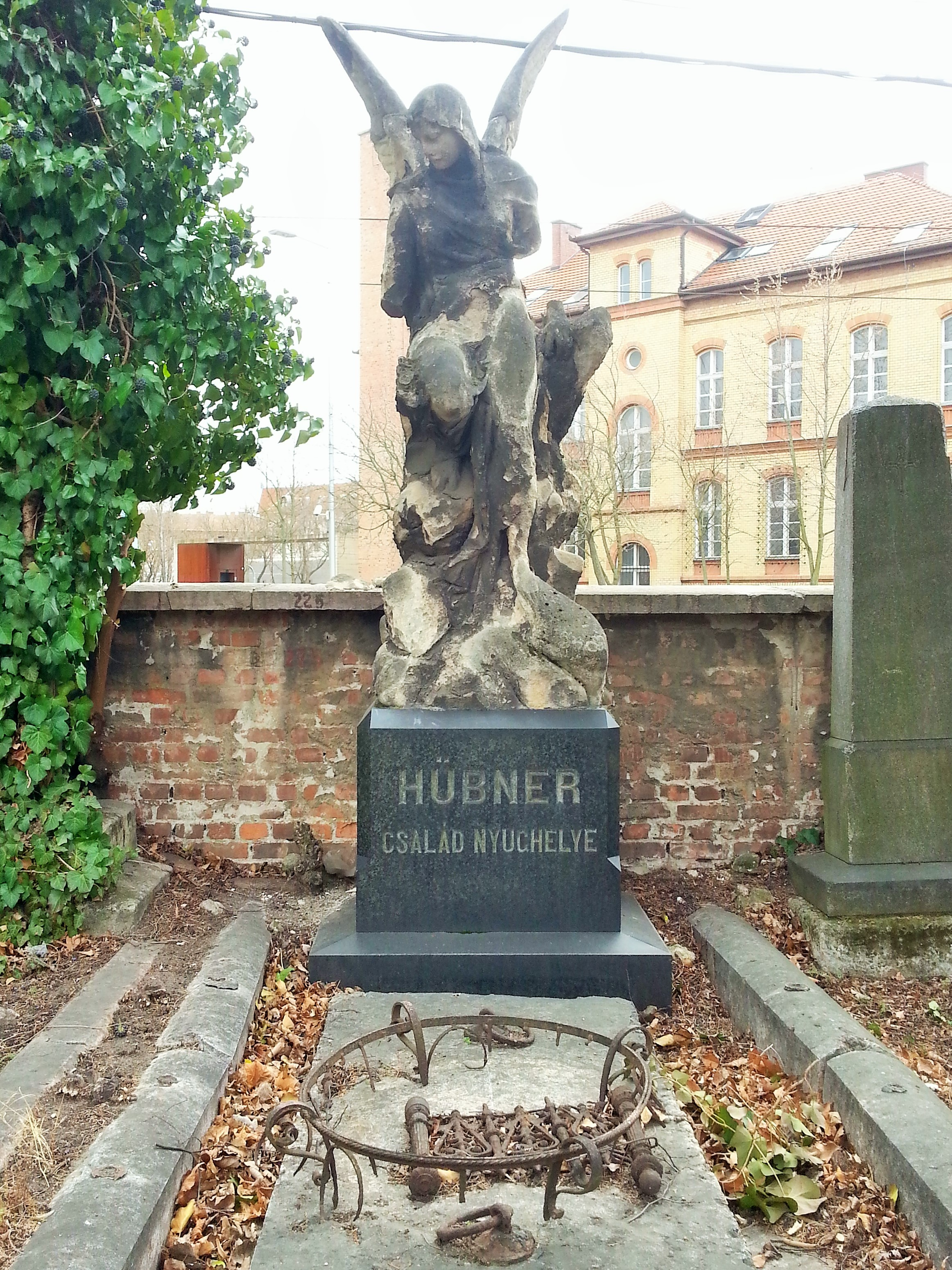
Tomb with angel statue (Hübner family), Fiumei út cemetery

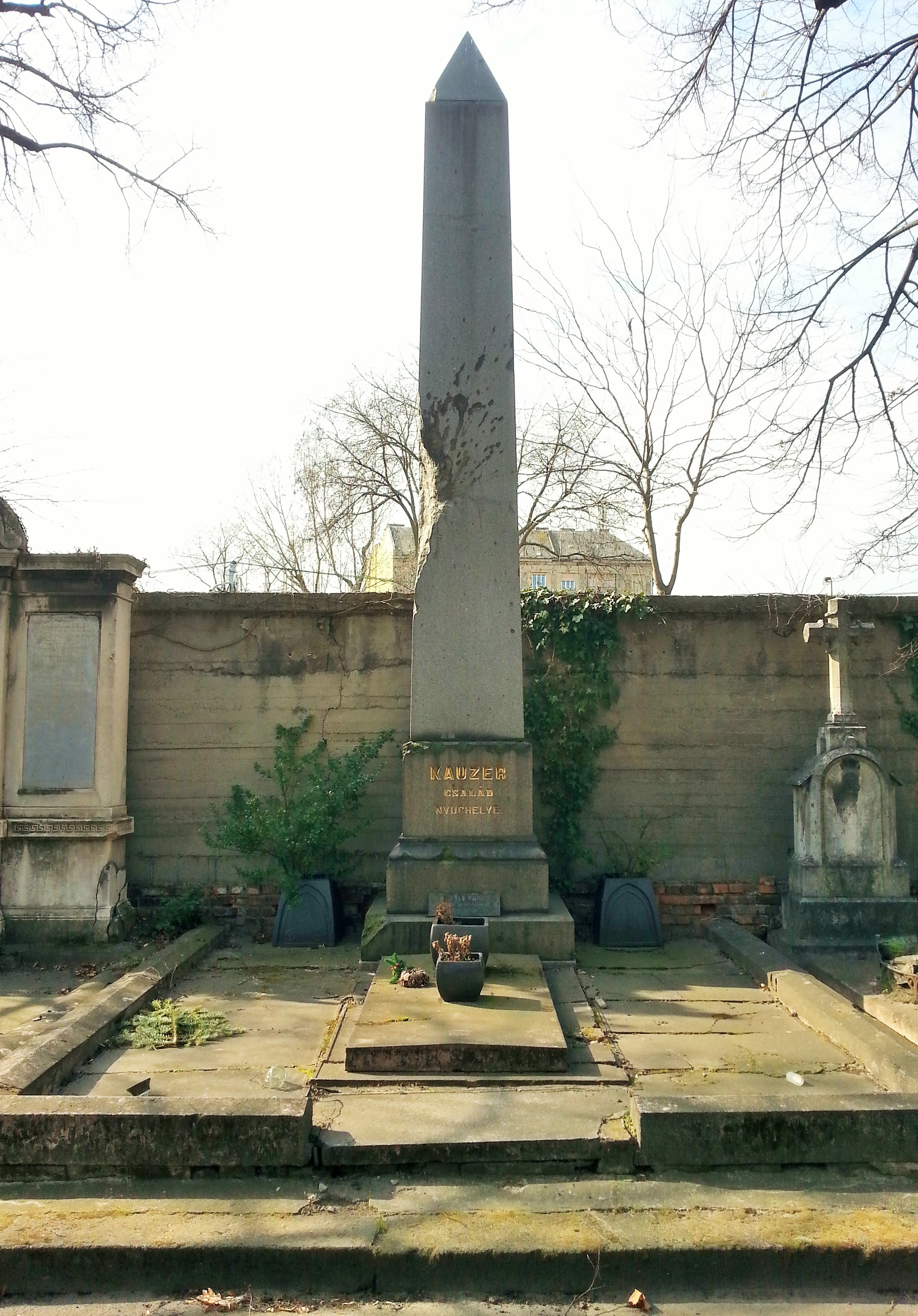
Obelisk grave (Kauzer family), Fiumei út cemetery

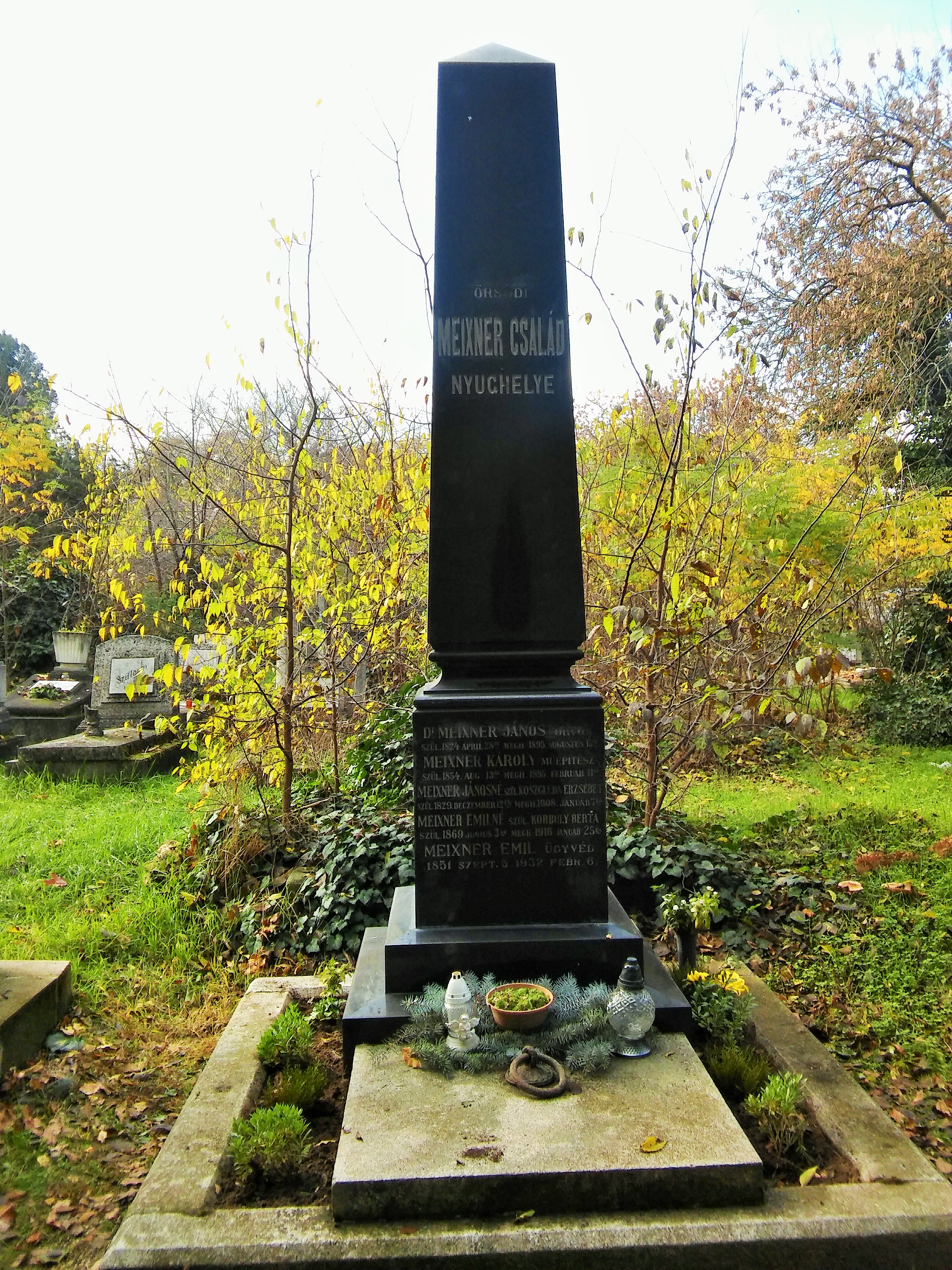
Obelisk grave (Meixner family), New public cemetery

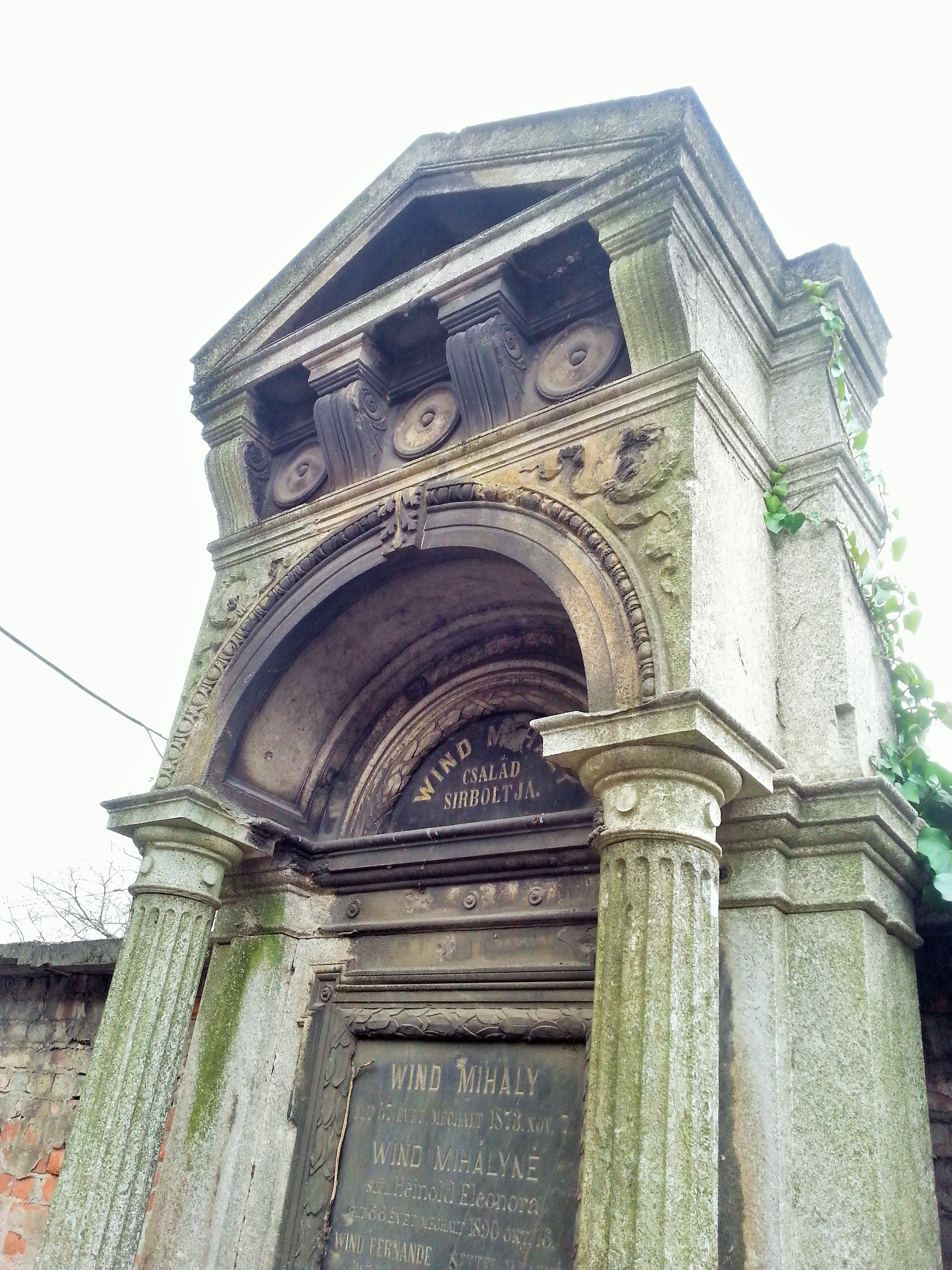
Simpler grave structure (Wind family), Fiumei út cemetery

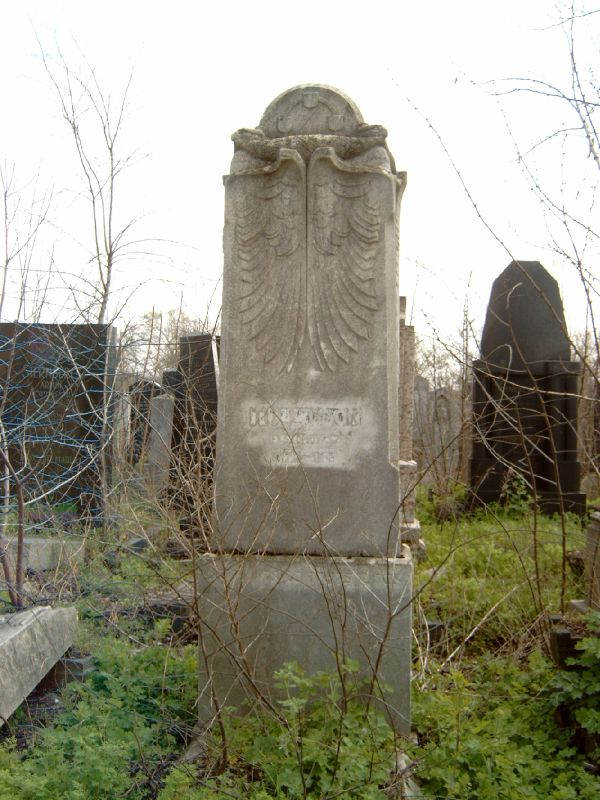
Stele-like grave monument (Tull Ödön), Kozma utca Israelite cemetery

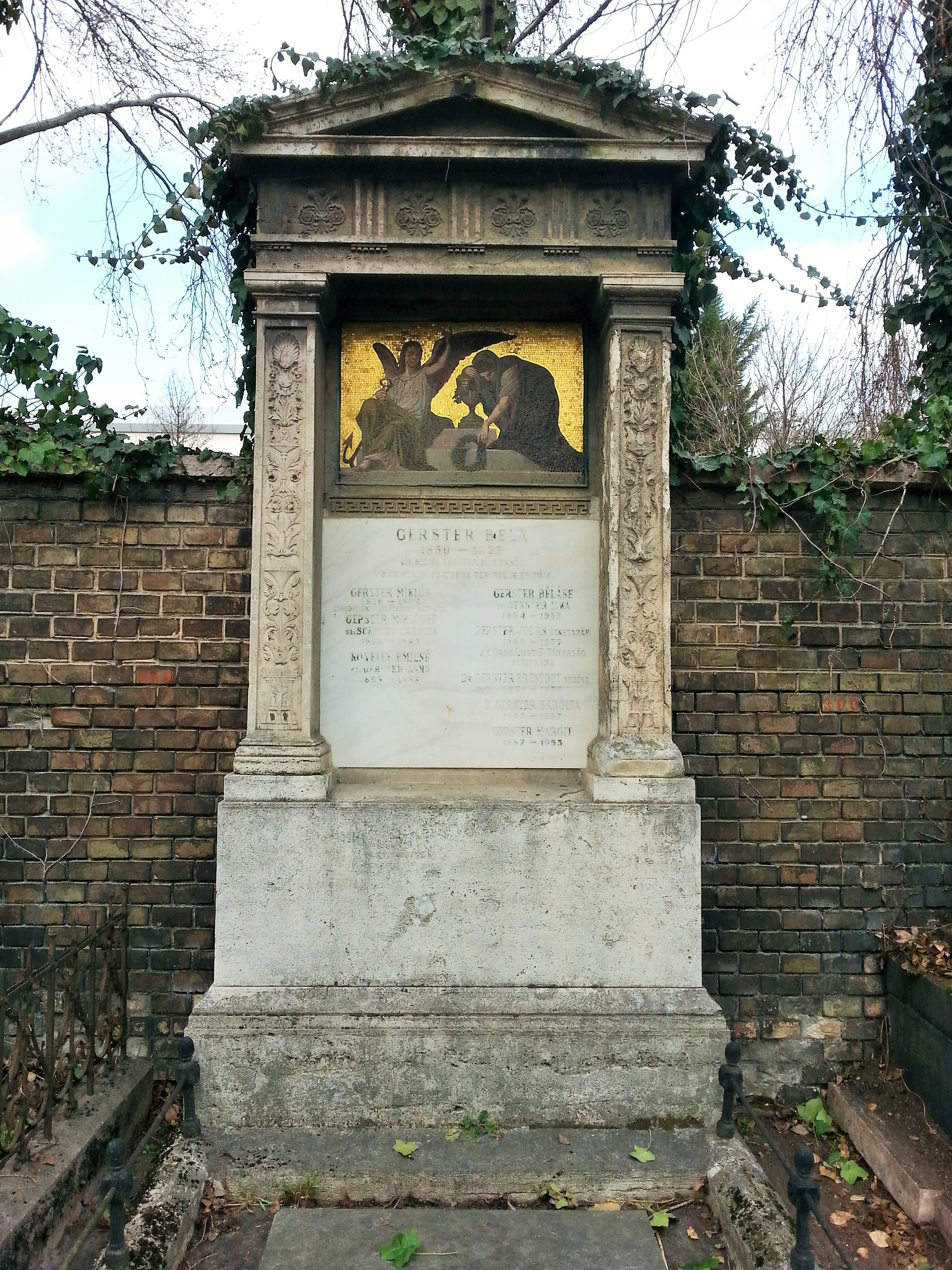
Stele-like, mosaic-decorated tomb structure (Gerster family), Fiumei út cemetery

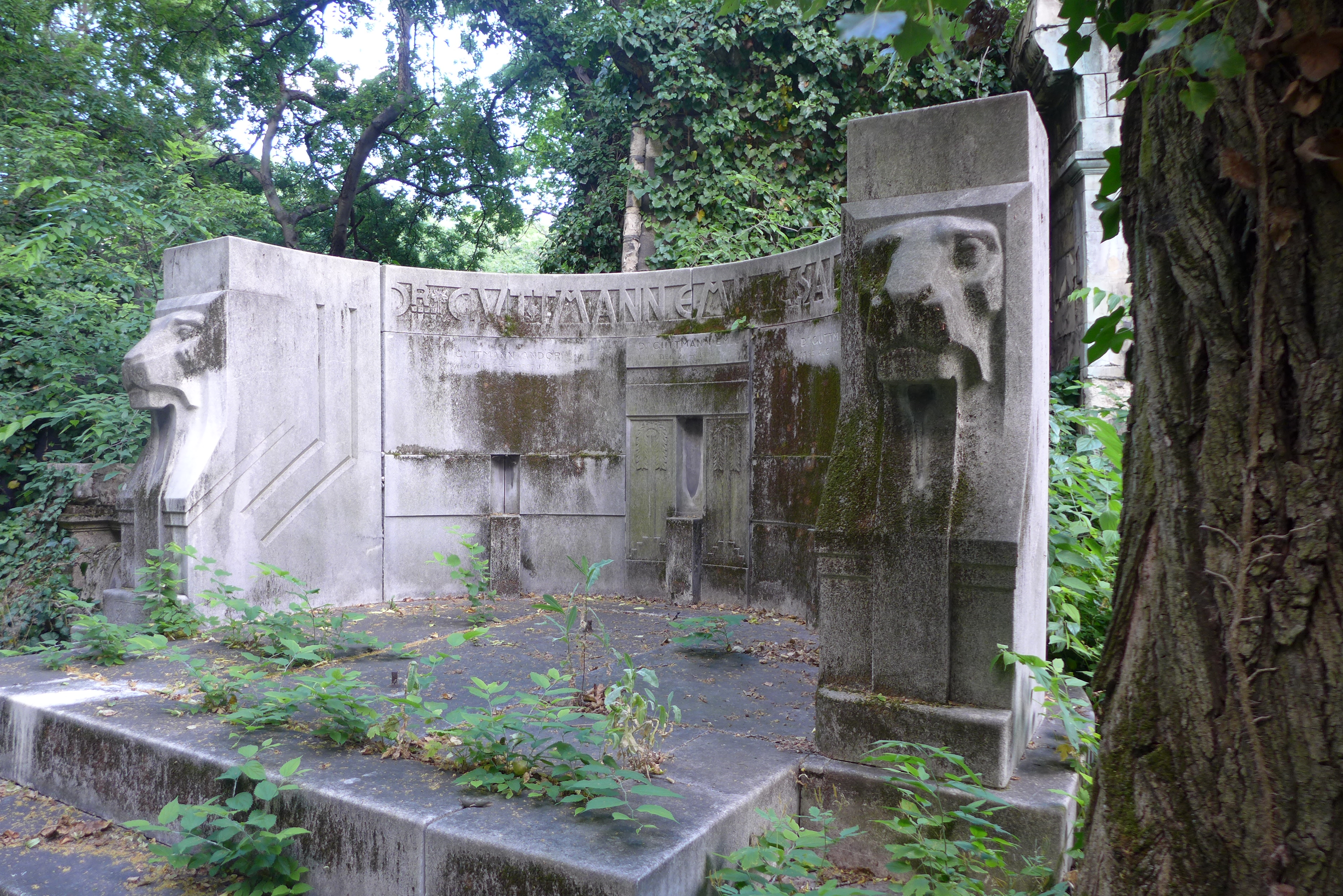
Simpler grave structure (Emil Guttmann), Salgótarjáni Street Jewish Cemetery

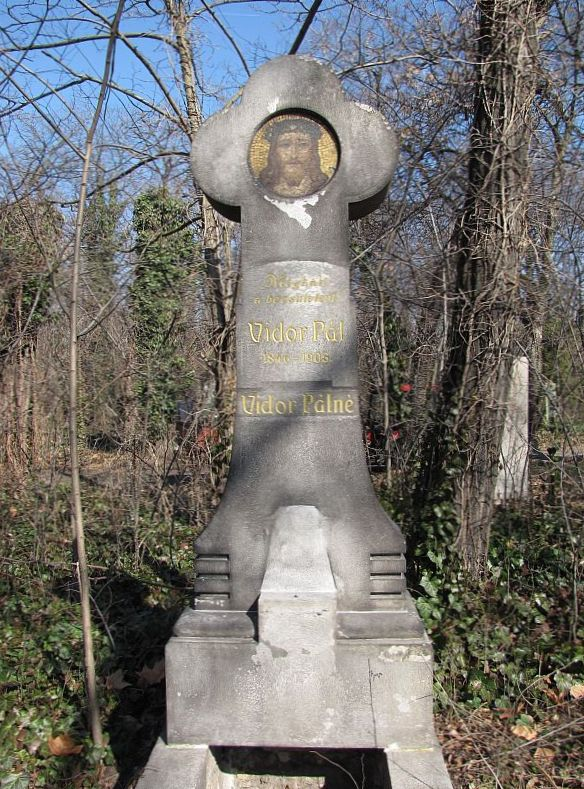
Stele-like tomb (Pál Vidor), Fiumei út cemetery

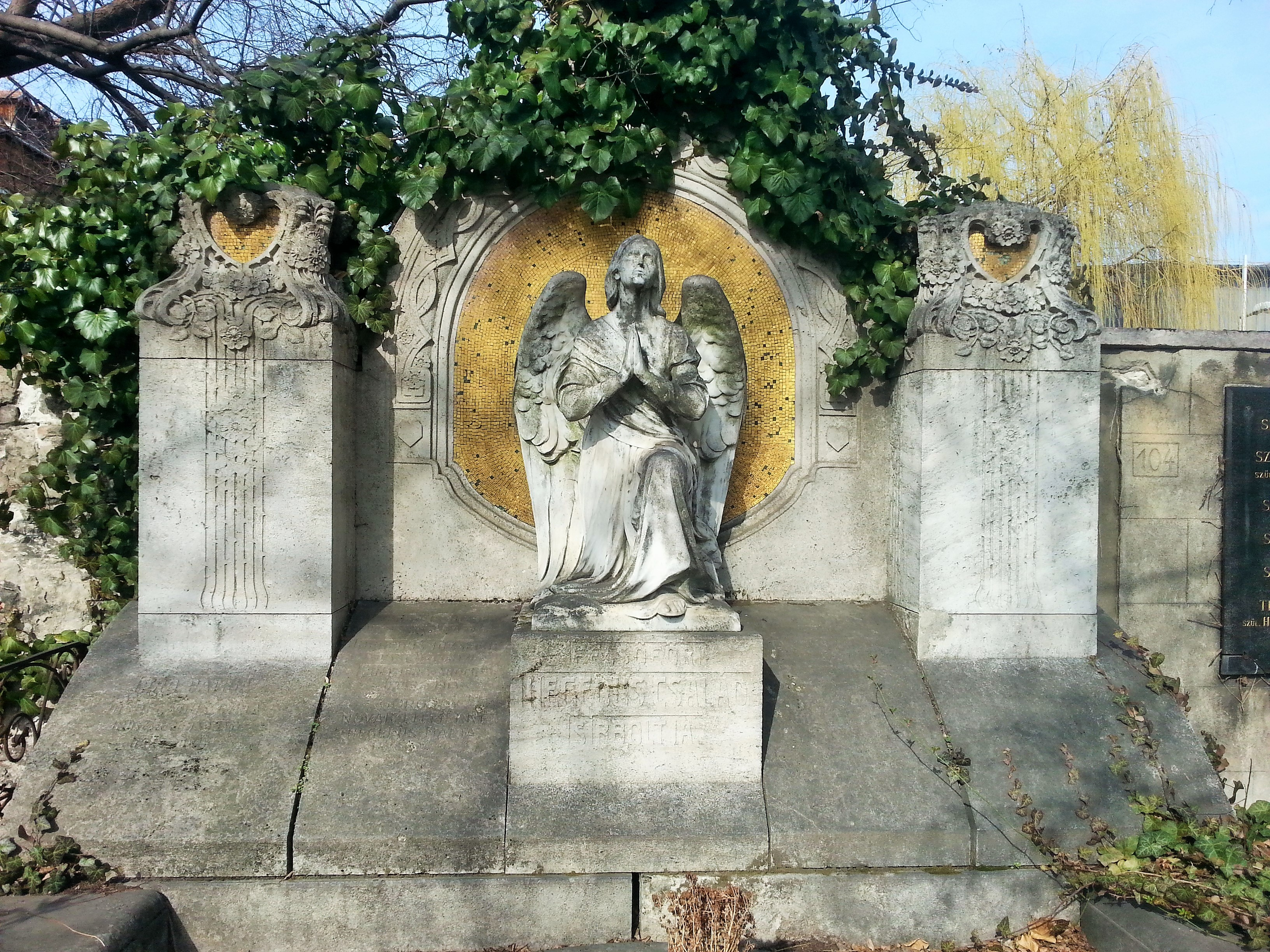
Angel with mosaic-decorated tomb structure (Hegedüs family), Fiumei út cemetery

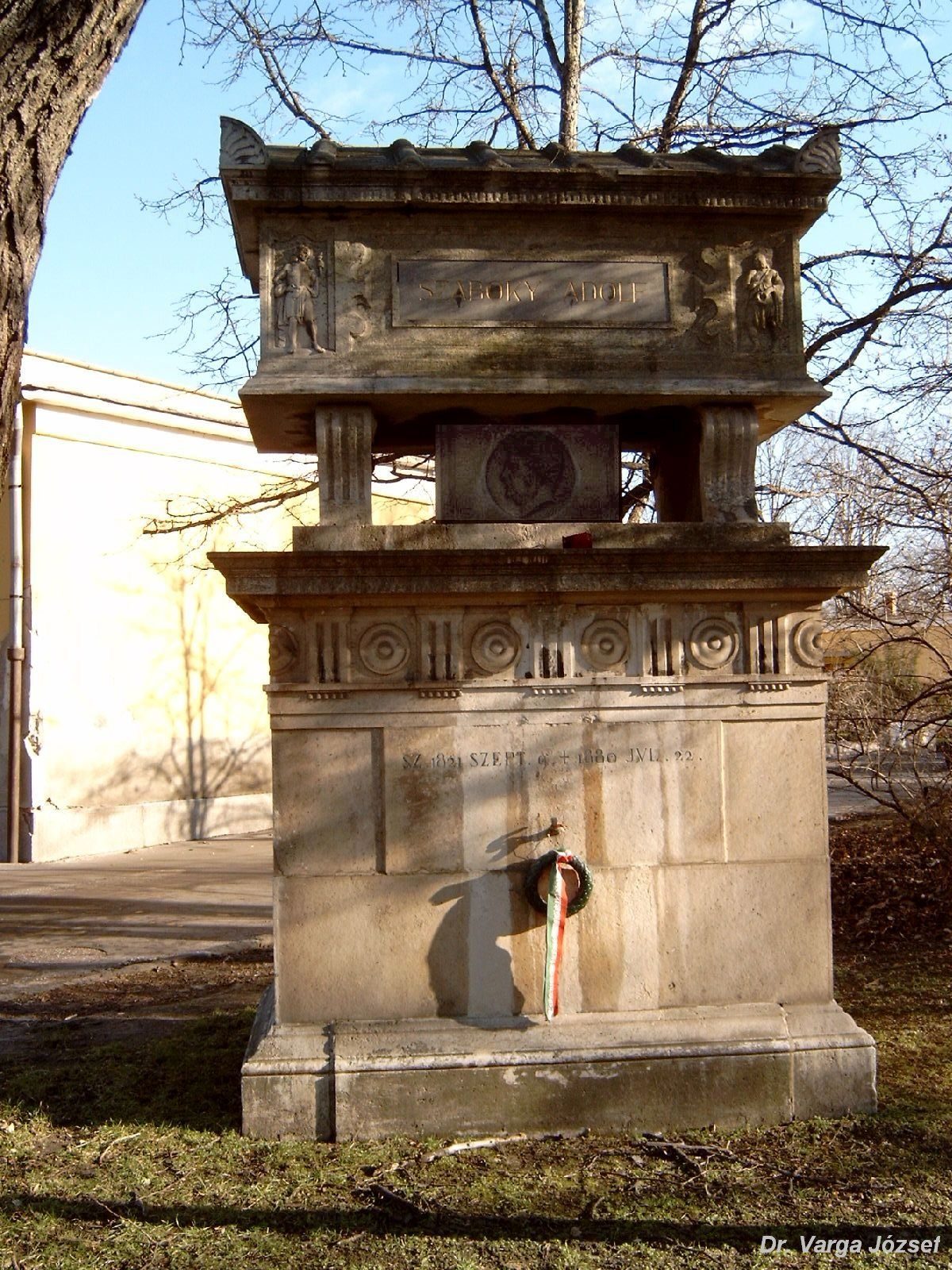
Raised sarcophagus tomb (Adolf Szabóky), Fiumei út cemetery

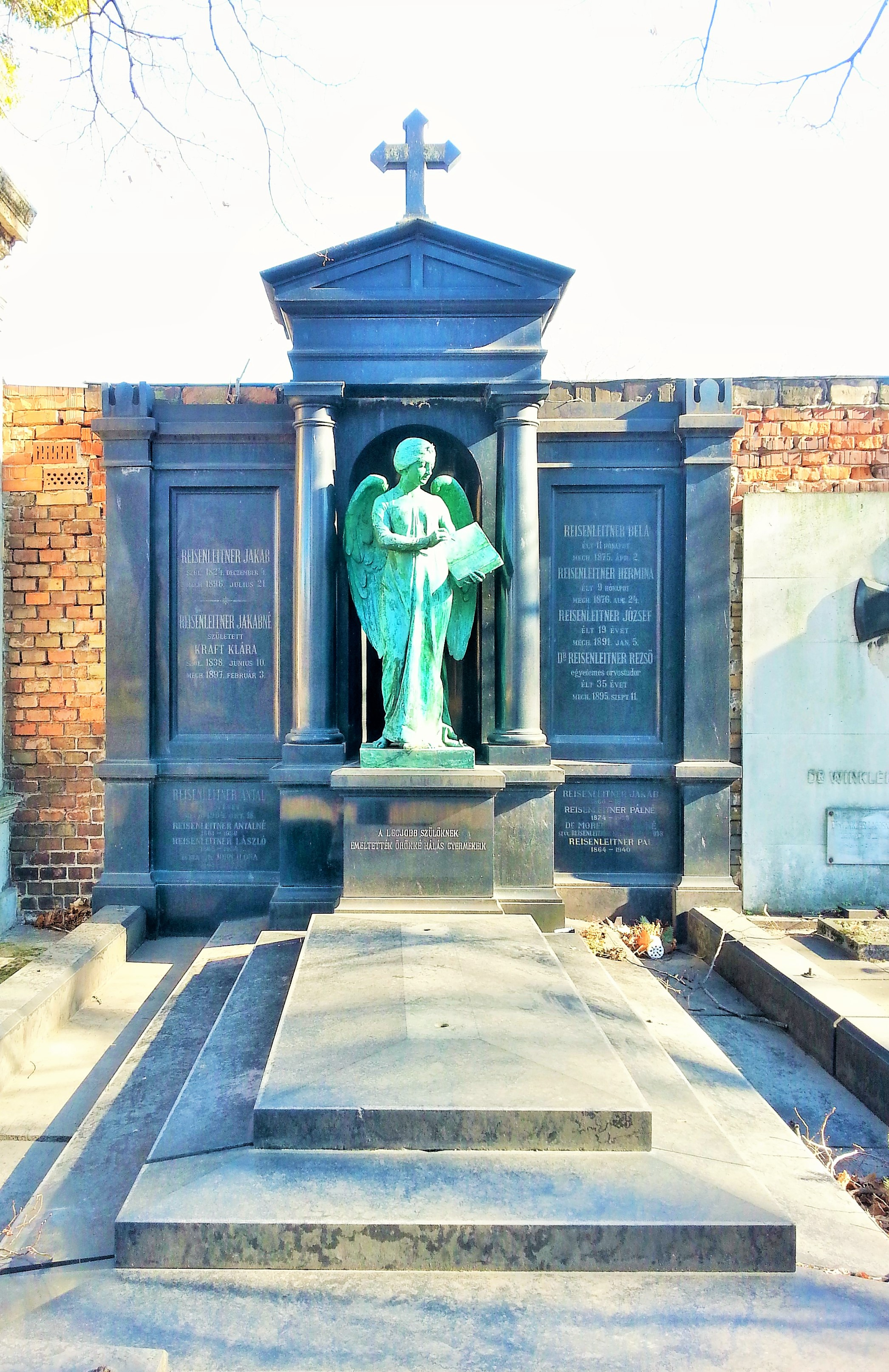
Larger, sculpture-decorated grave monument (Reisenleitner), Fiumei út cemetery

== Mausoleums ==
The uncrowned kings of tomb architecture are certainly the huge mausoleums. There are two types of them: actual, covered, family mausoleums, and open, mausoleum-like structures (e.g. Manfréd Weiss's tomb). These can be found primarily in the Fiumeit út cemetery, the Jewish cemetery on Salgótarjáni út, and the Jewish cemetery on Kozma utca. Here we are talking about significant architectural (and often sculptural) works, mausoleums are actually smaller two-story buildings, the upper (above ground) part of which is often a chapel, and the lower (underground) part is the actual tomb, the crypt. Among the mausoleums is the largest family tomb in Hungary, the Kossuth mausoleum, which also contains the remains of Lajos Kossuth. The equally large Saxlehner mausoleum was destroyed during the Second World War.

It is interesting that the Thalmayer mausoleum was transformed into an ossuary over time.

(The appearance of church crypts is also similar to the interior design of mausoleums. Perhaps the most famous of them is the Nádori crypt in Buda Castle. Frigyes Feszl, the architect of Pesti Vigadó, designed the tomb of Manó Zichy's wife in the Kálvin tér Reformed Church.)

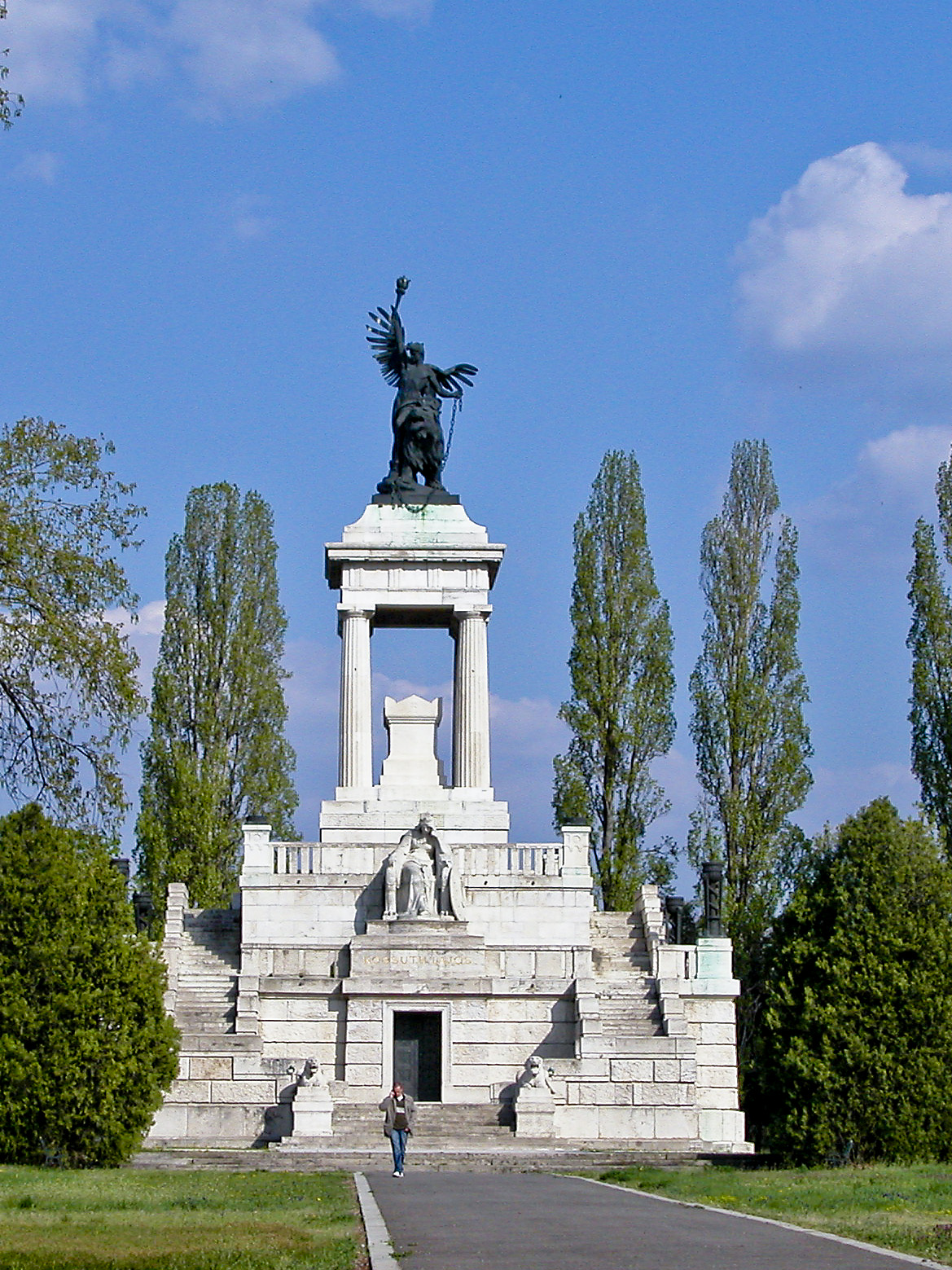
Kossuth mausoleum, Fiumei út cemetery

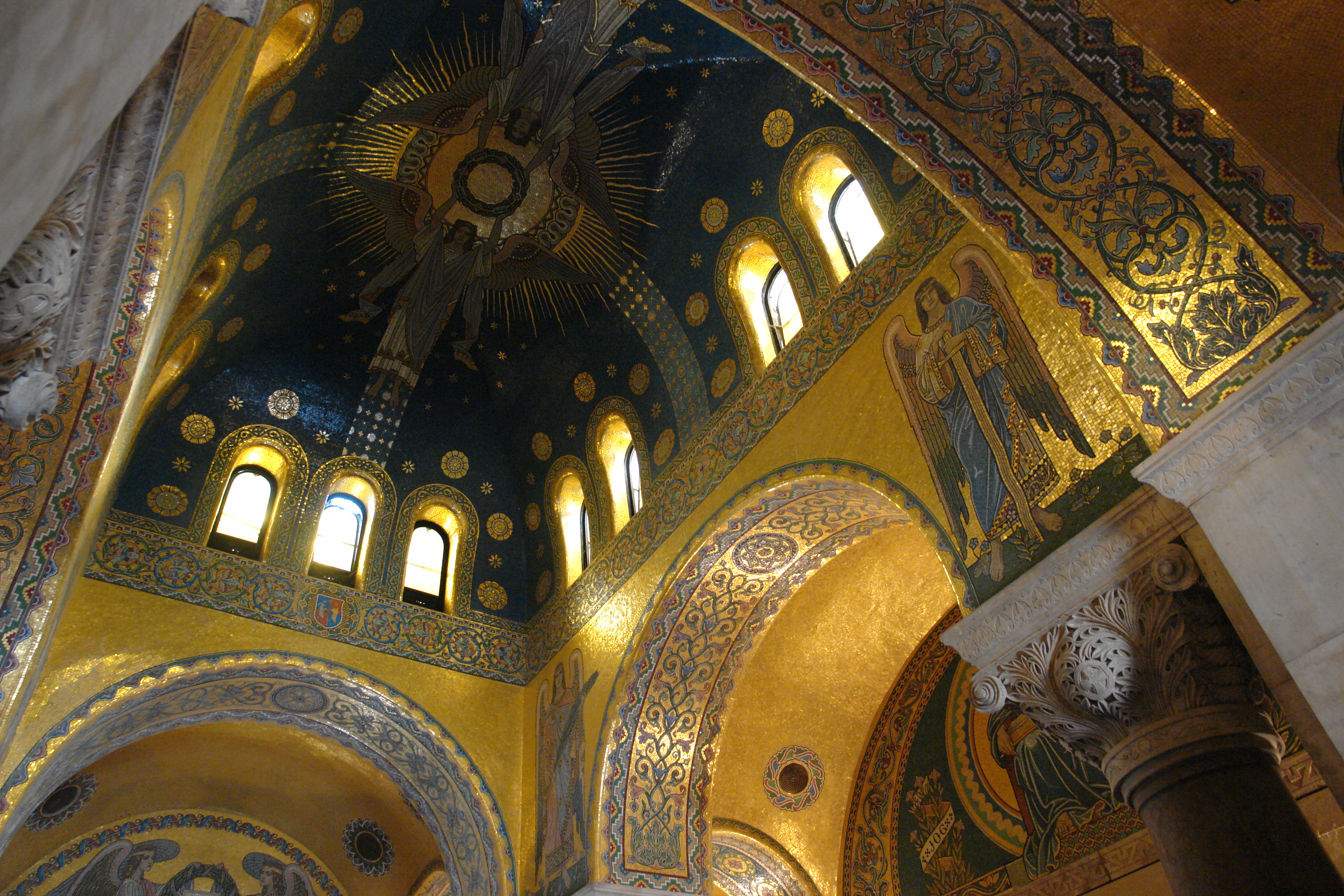
Kossuth mausoleum, Fiumei út cemetery (interior)

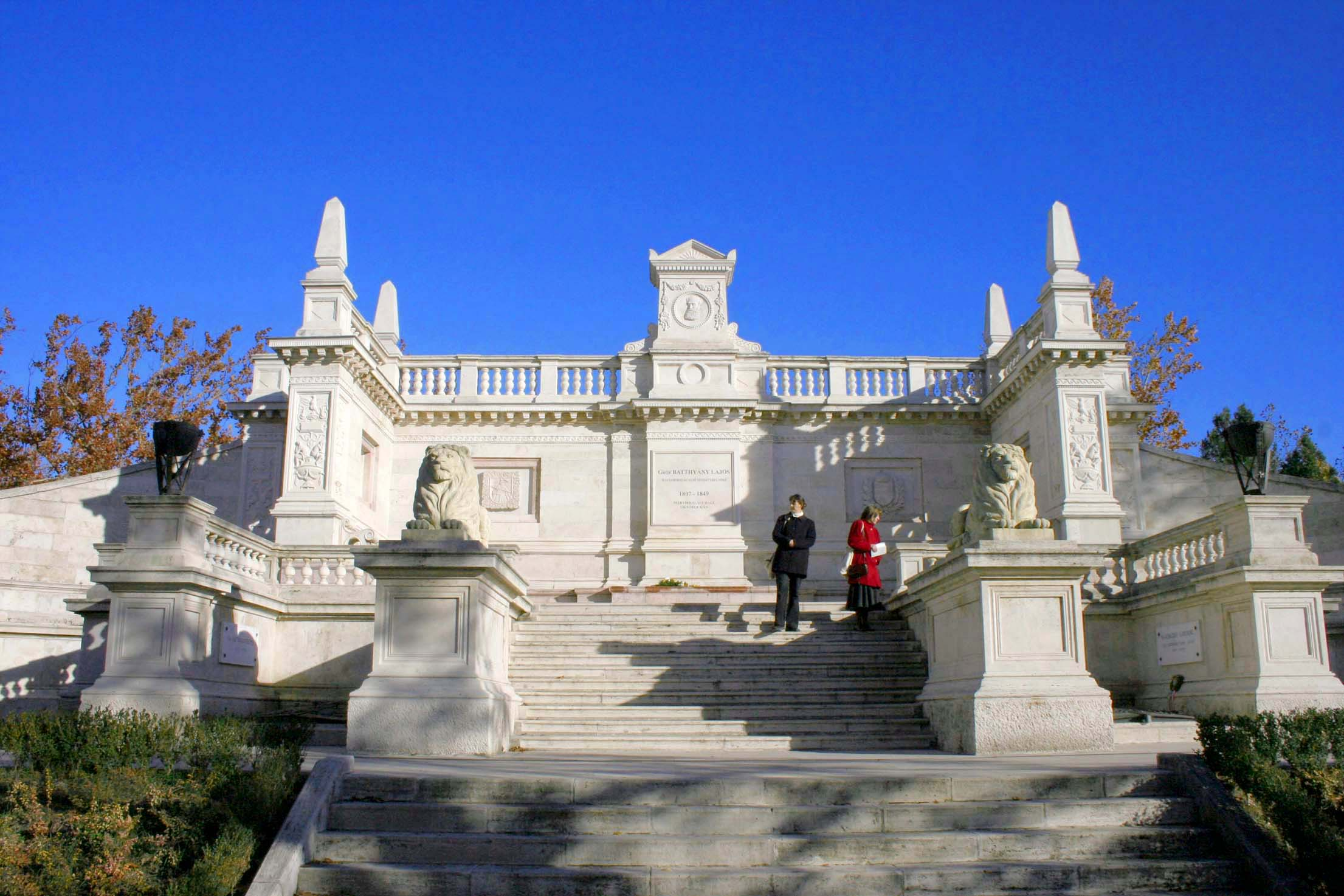
Batthyány mausoleum, Fiumei út cemetery

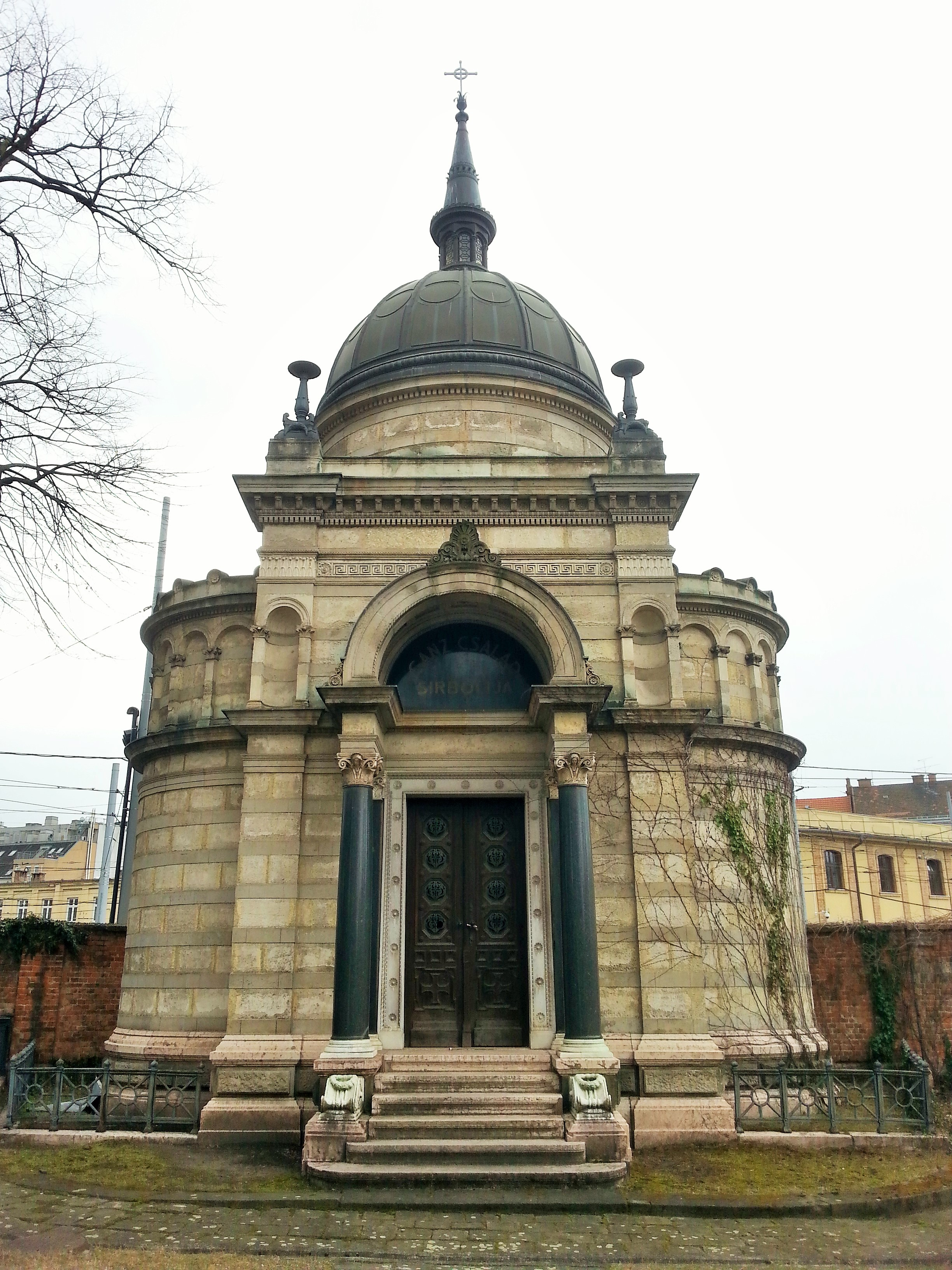
Ganz mausoleum, Fiumei út cemetery

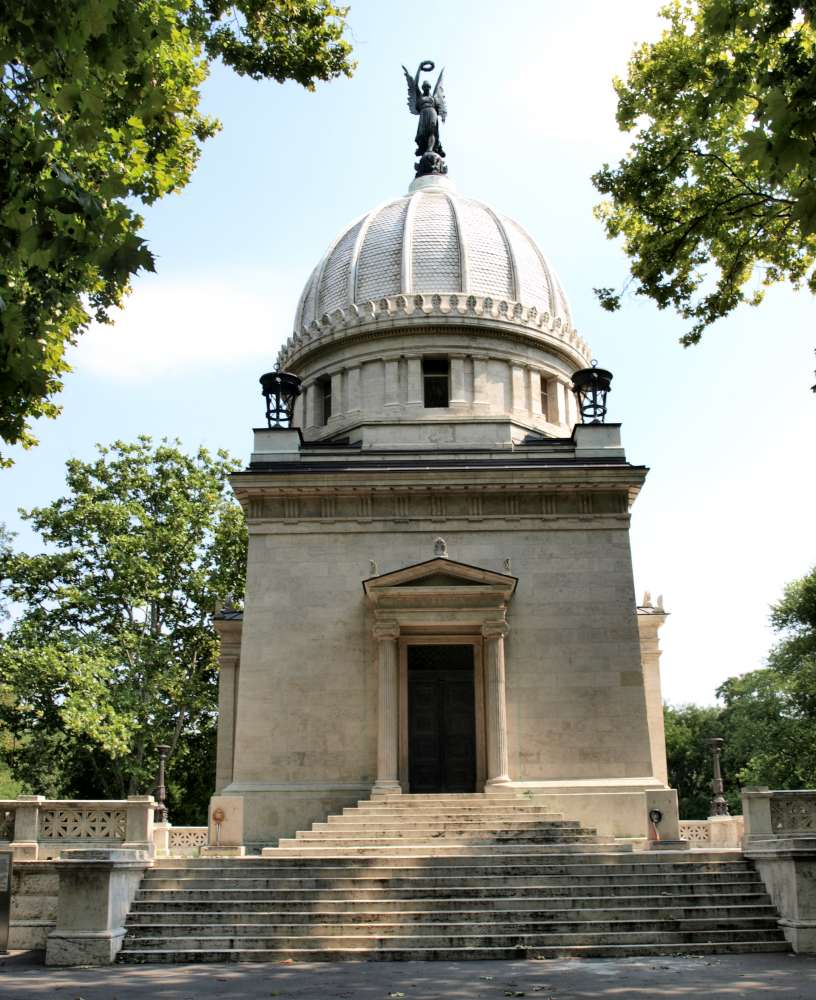
Deák mausoleum, Fiumei út cemetery

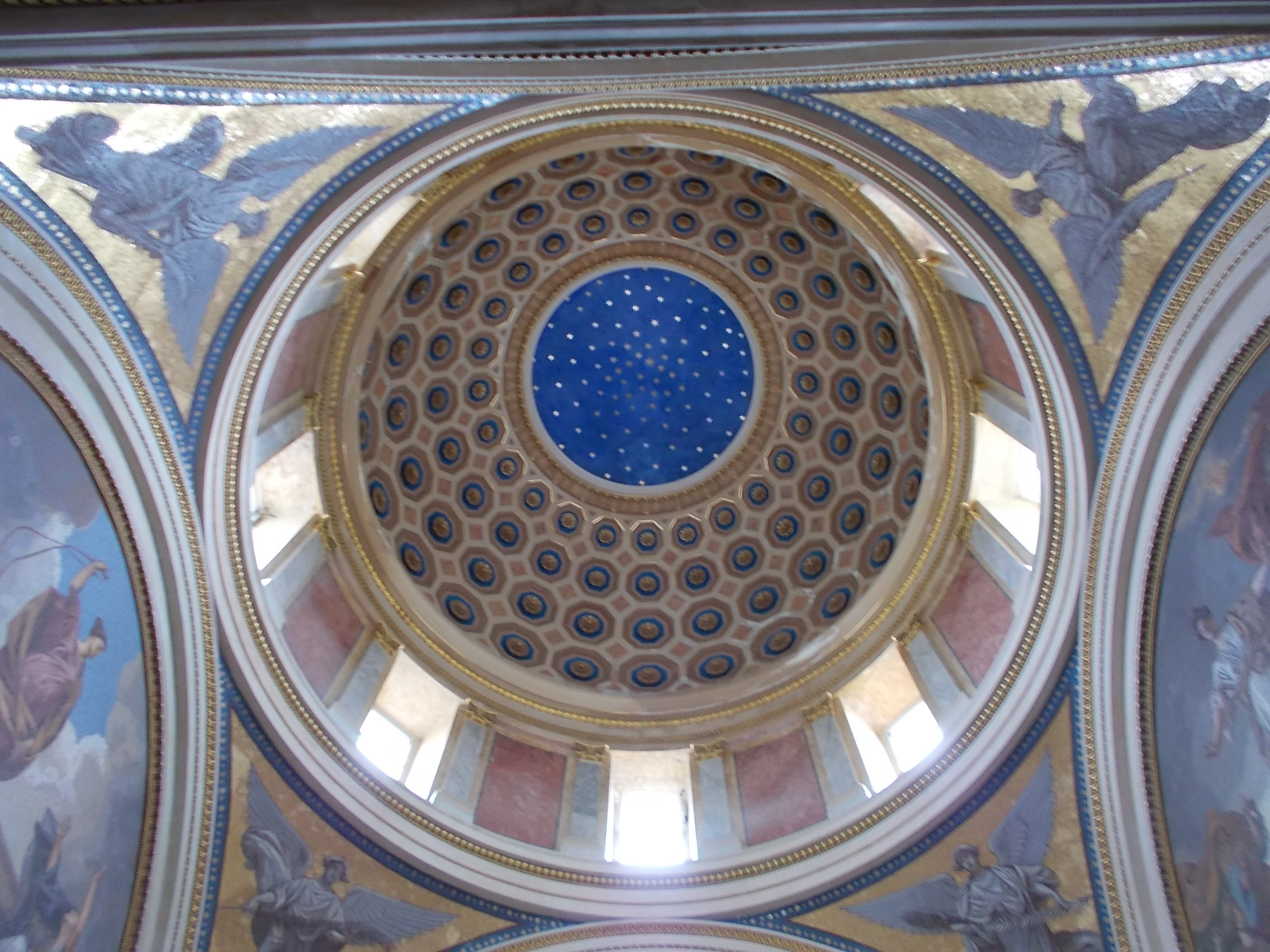
Deák mausoleum, Fiumei út cemetery (interior)

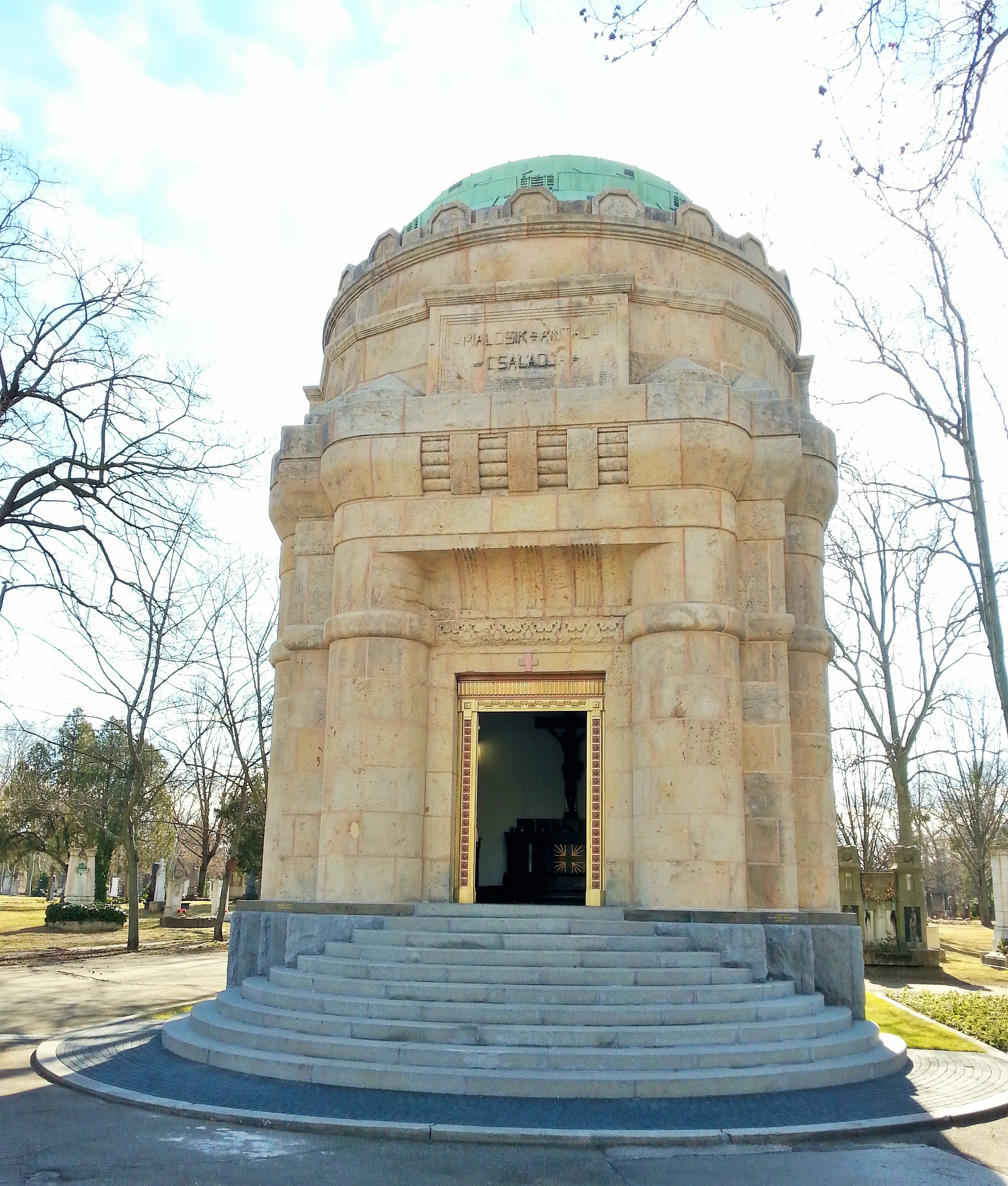
Malosik mausoleum, Fiumei út cemetery

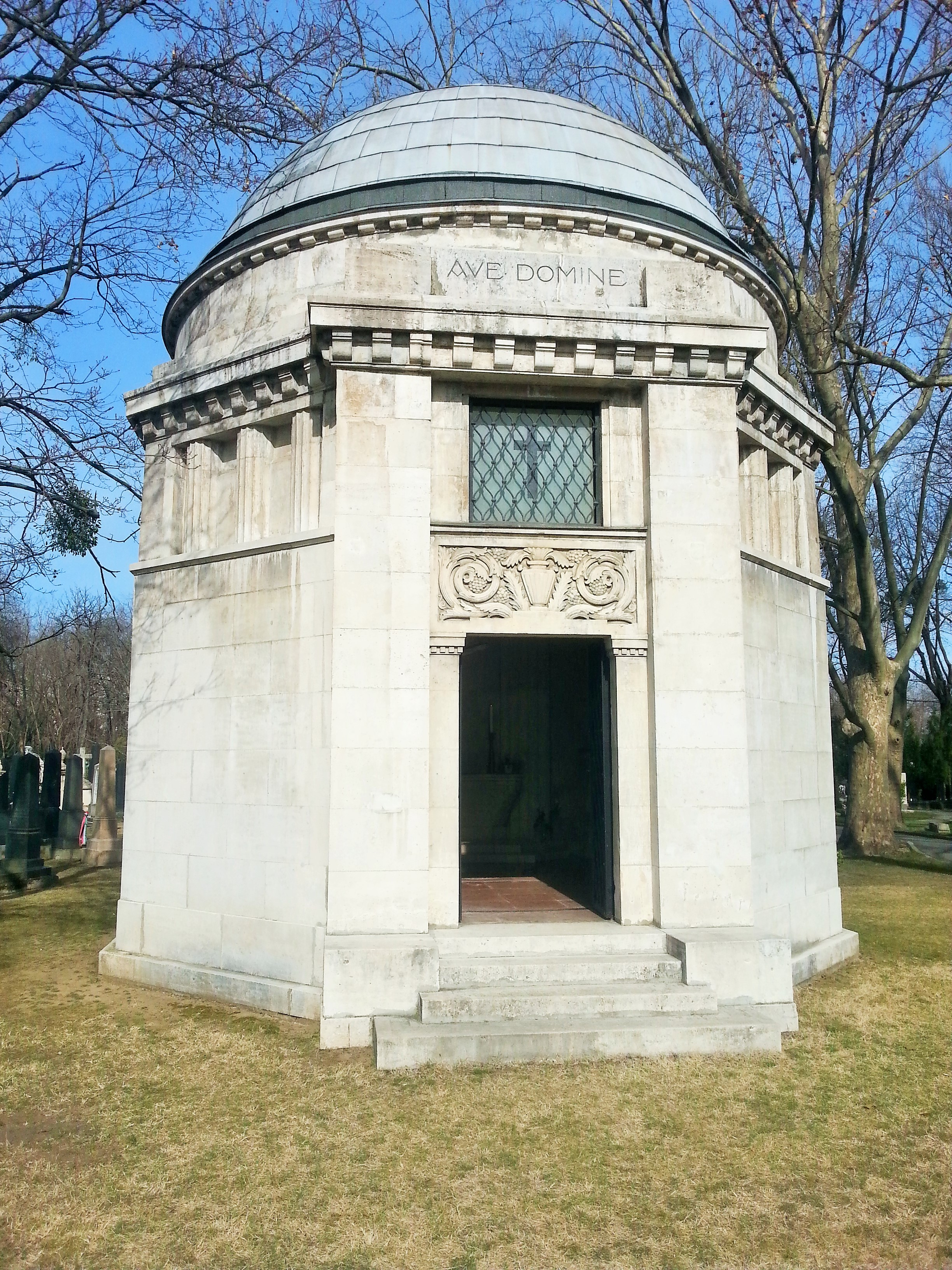
″Ave Domine″ mausoleum, Fiumei út cemetery

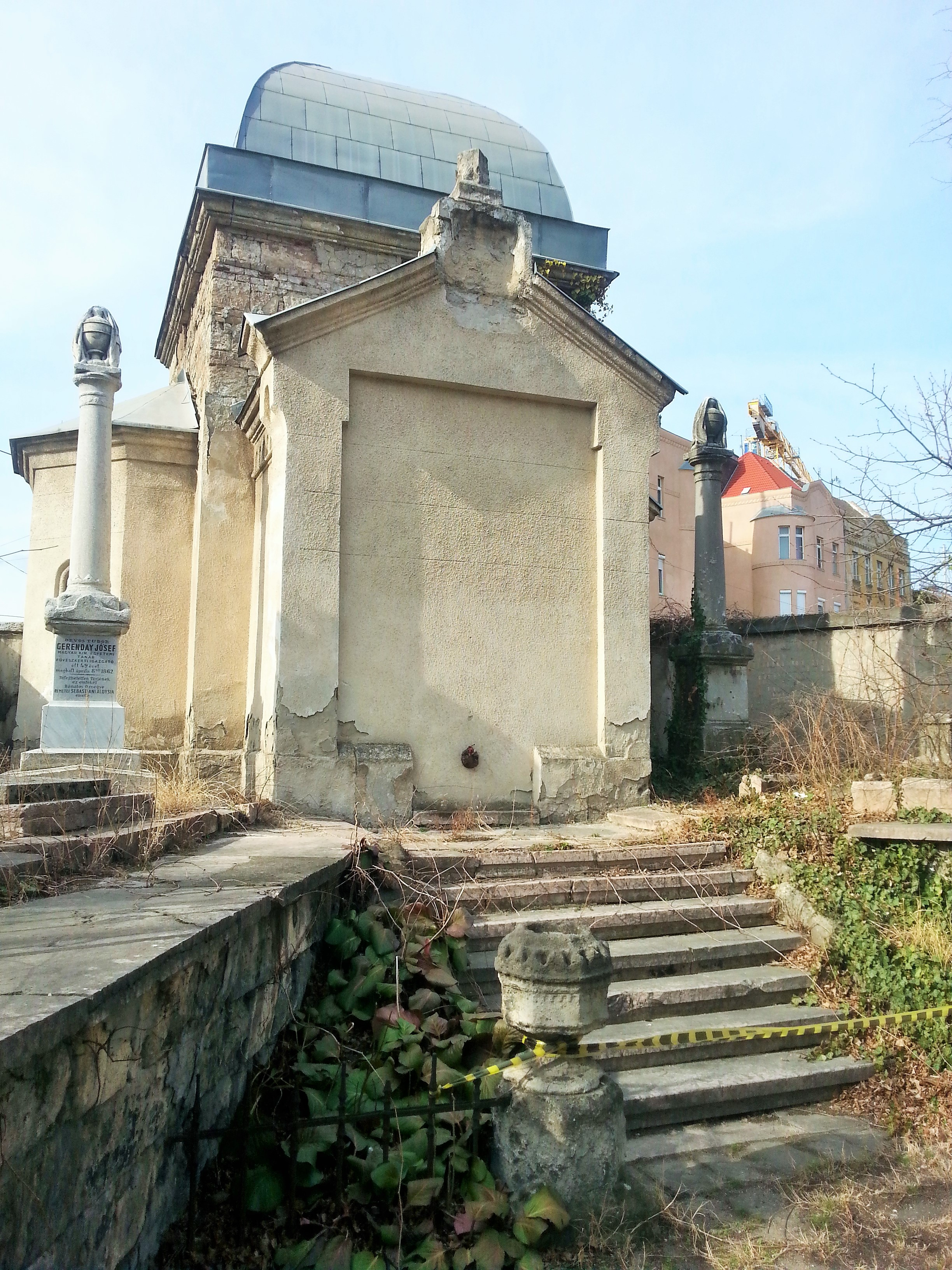
Sebastiani mausoleum, Fiumei út cemetery

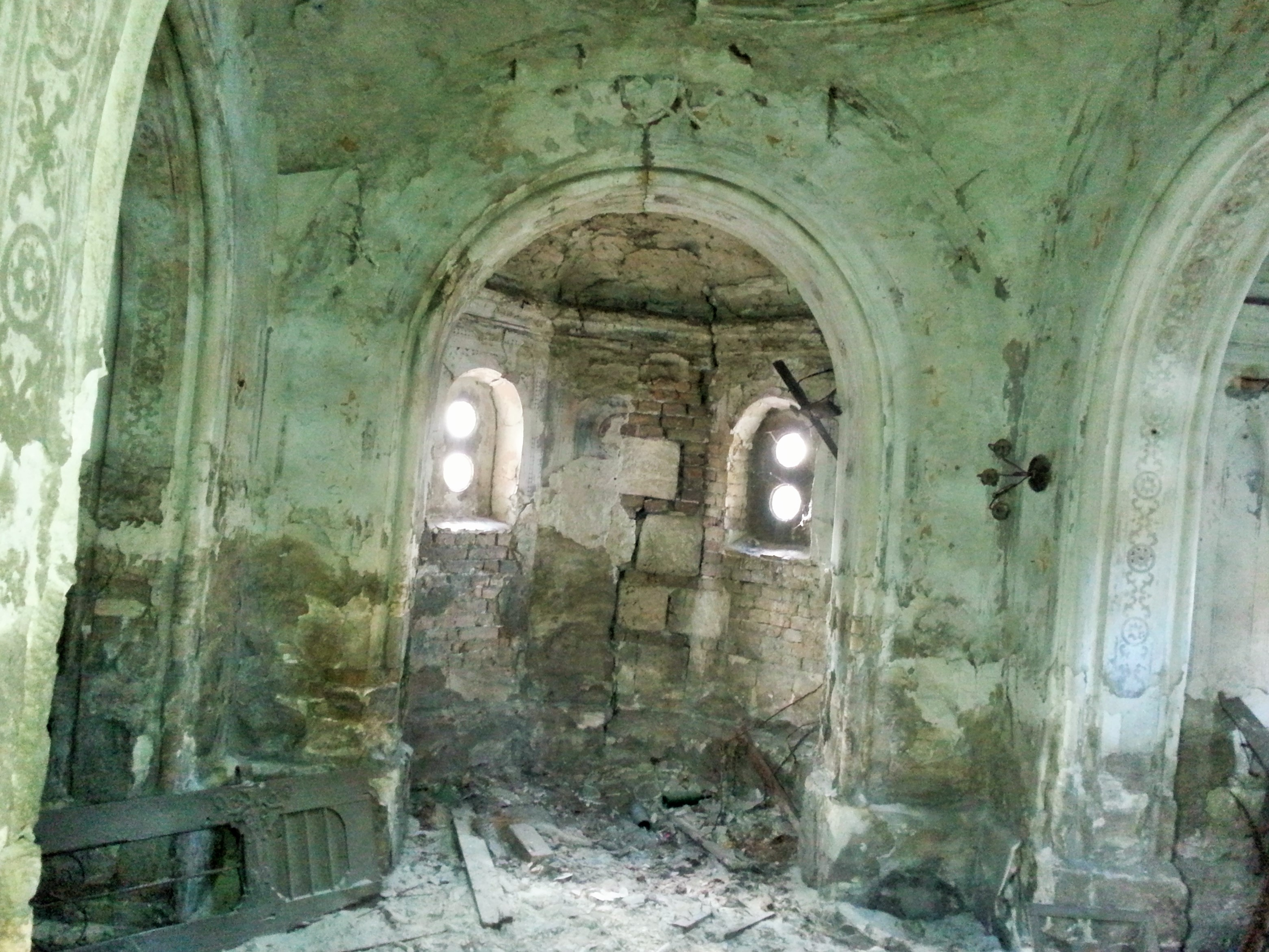
Sebastiani mausoleum, Fiumei út cemetery (interior)

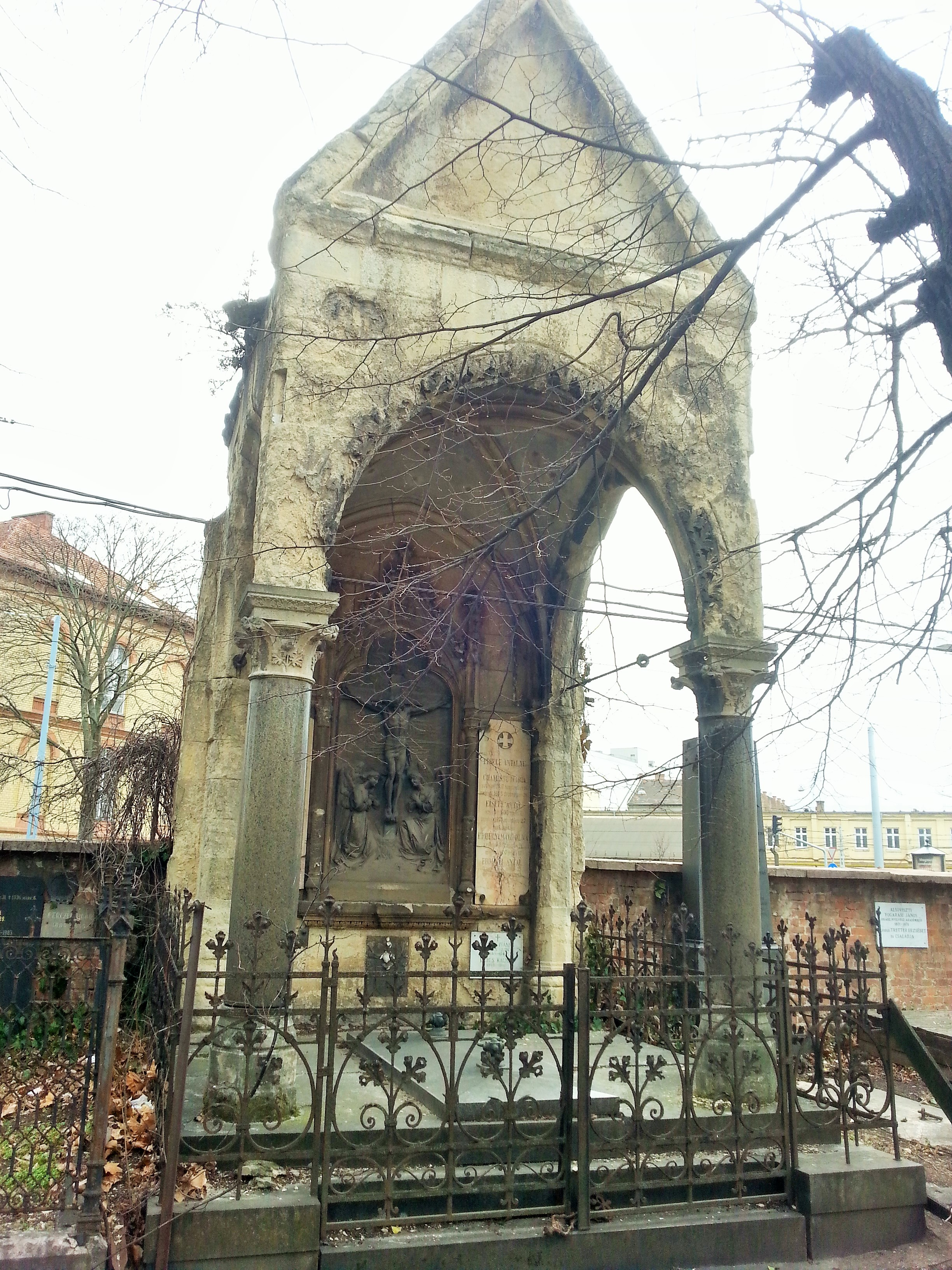
Eisele-Jálics mausoleum, Fiumei út cemetery

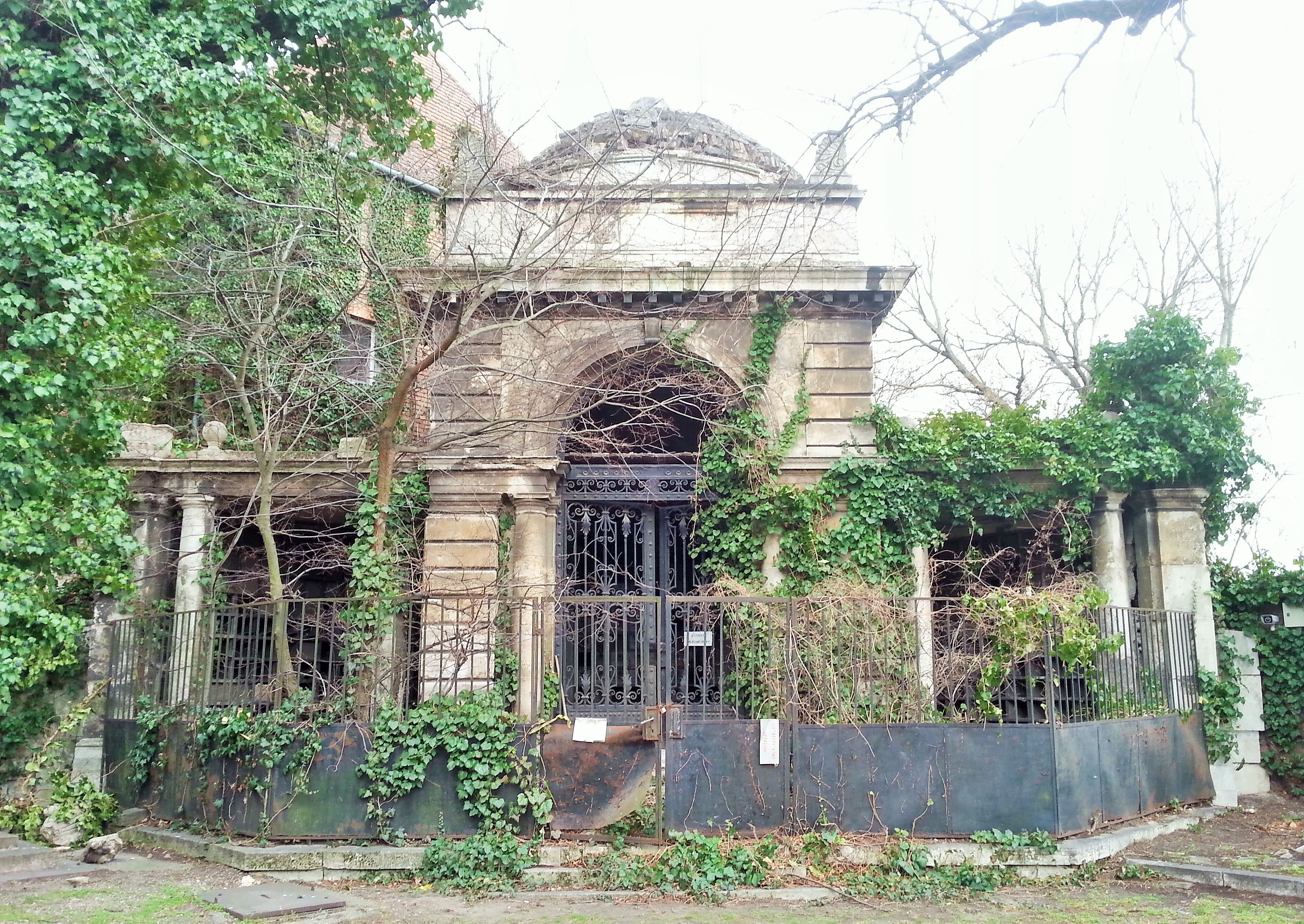
Thalmayer mausoleum, Fiumei út cemetery

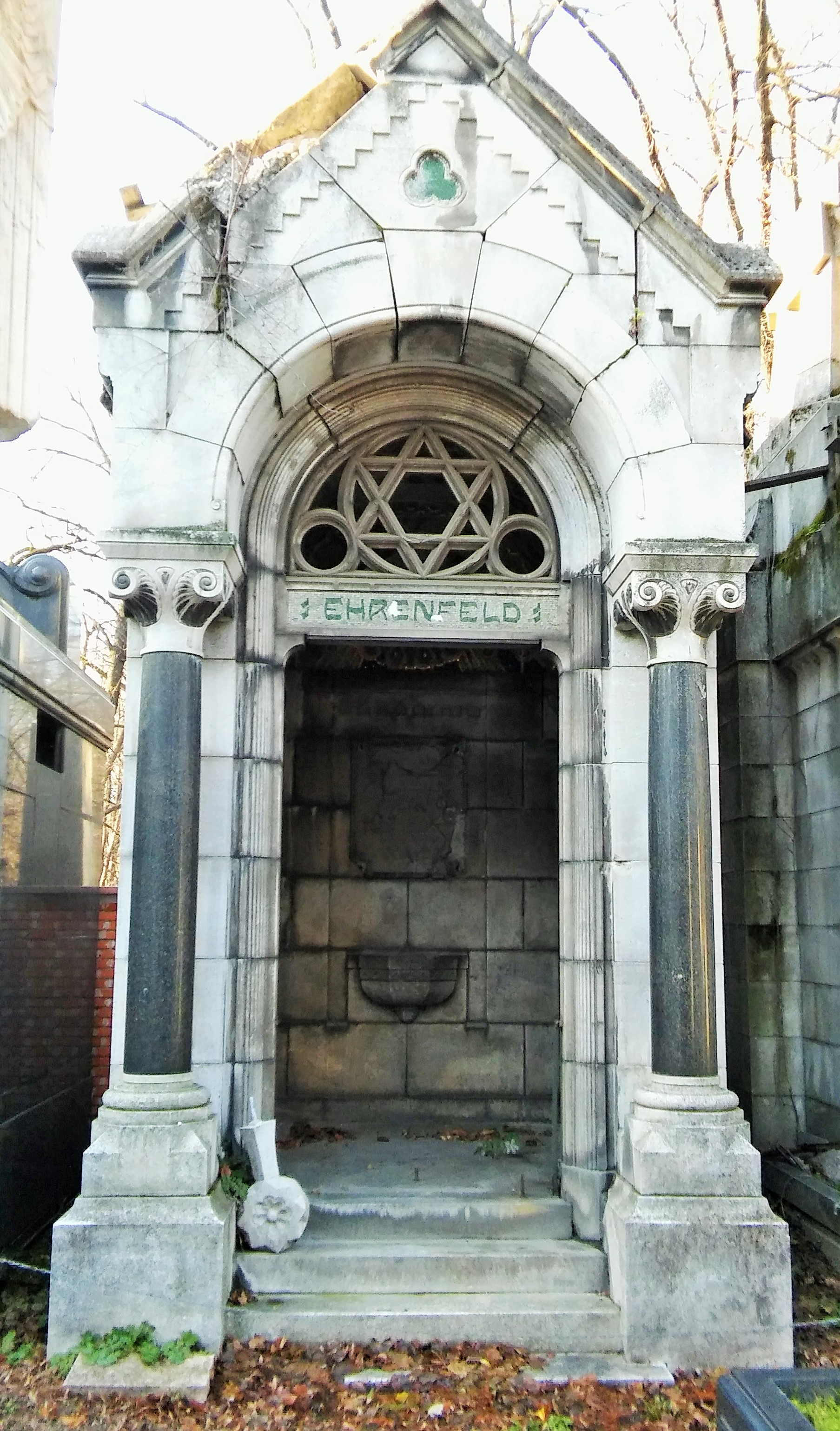
Ehrenfeld Mausoleum, Salgótarjáni Street Jewish Cemetery

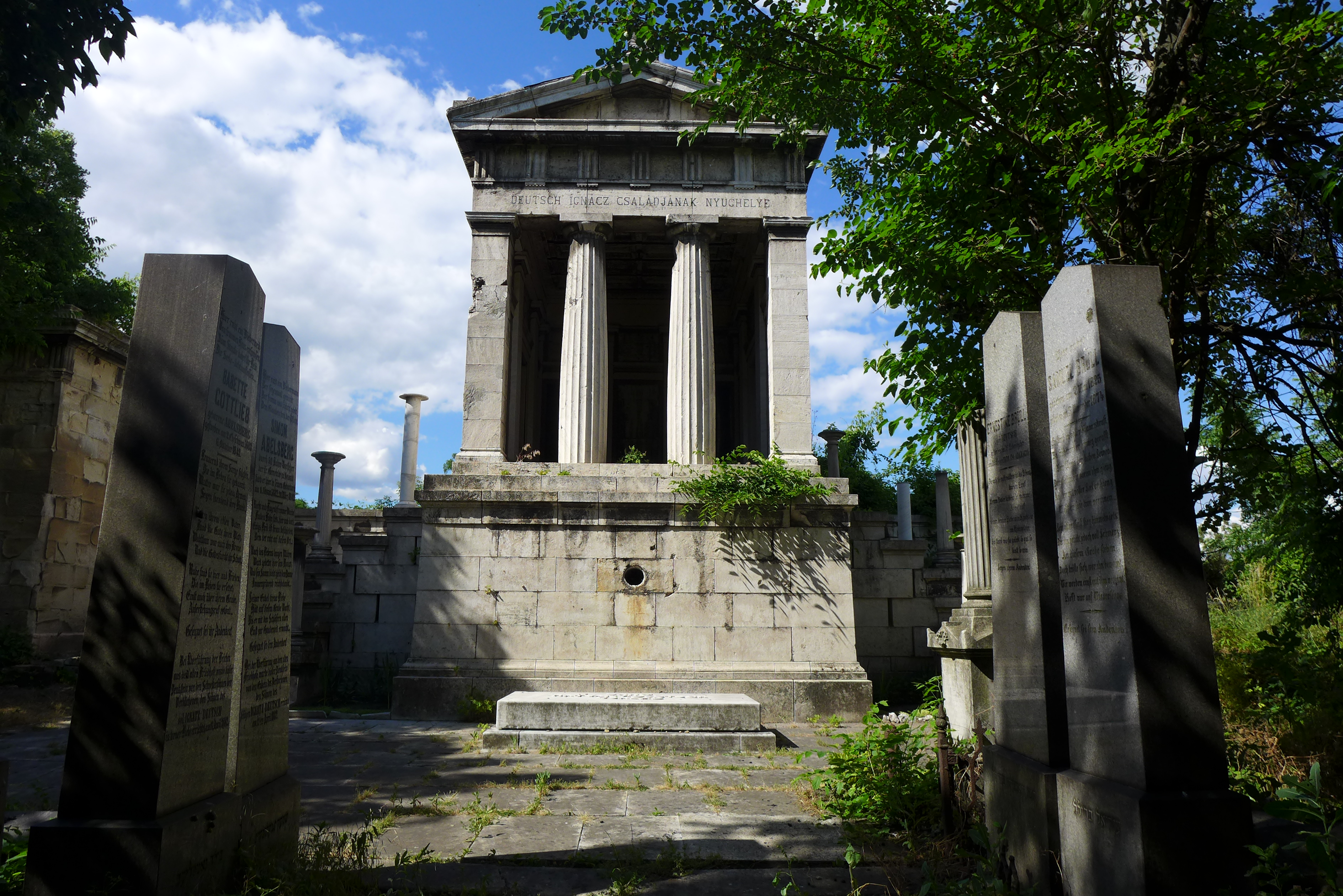
Deutsch mausoleum, Salgótarjáni street Jewish cemetery

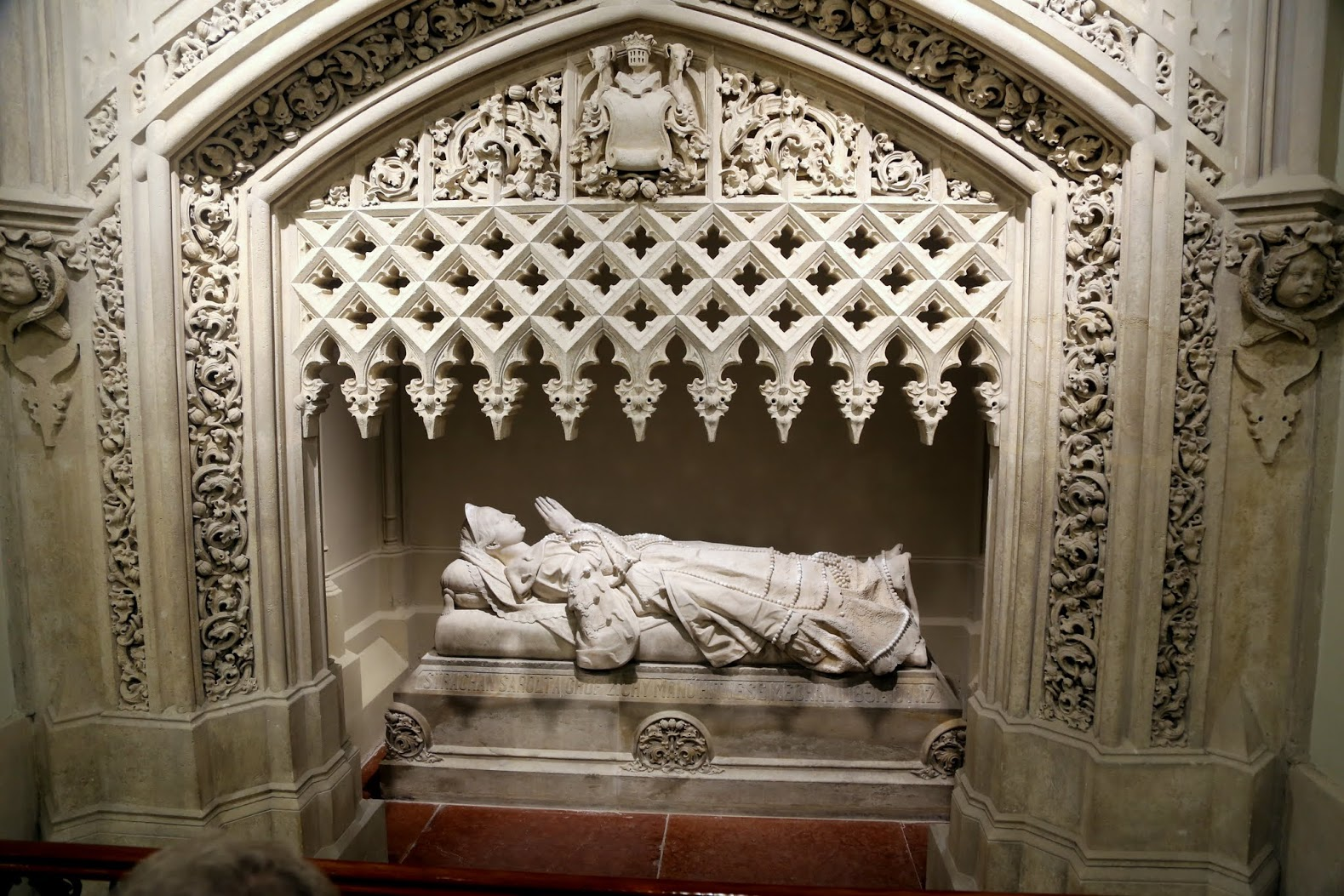
Tombstone of Count Zichy Manó's wife, Kálvin Square Reformed Church

== Arcades, urn holders ==
Arcade tombs are large tombs similar to mausoleums. There are not many of these in Budapest. In the Fiumei út cemetery, two rows of monumental arcades with crypts, the New public cemetery and the Farkasréti cemetery were constructed with urn holders. A modern, mid-20th-century urn-holding building is the Labor Movement Pantheon of the Fiumei Úti Sírkert.

The arcade row of the Farkasrét cemetery, on the Érdi úti side was designed by Henrik Böhm and Ármin Hegedűs in 1899–1900. In 1938, when the cemetery chapel and mortuary were built, another row of arcades was created based on the designs of Virgil Krassói and Ferenc Módos.

At the beginning of the 20th century, the idea of designing arcades for the Jewish cemetery in Kozma Street arose, but this was not realized later.

Urn holders (similar to crypts) were also placed in the sub-temple part of churches, e.g. in the Great Szent Teréz Parish Church in Ávila, in the Heart of Jesus Church in Józsefváros, a Fasori református templomban. in the Reformed Church in Fasor. In addition to the sub-church of the Kelenföld Szent Gellért parish church, urns were also created in the above-ground, external environment of the church.

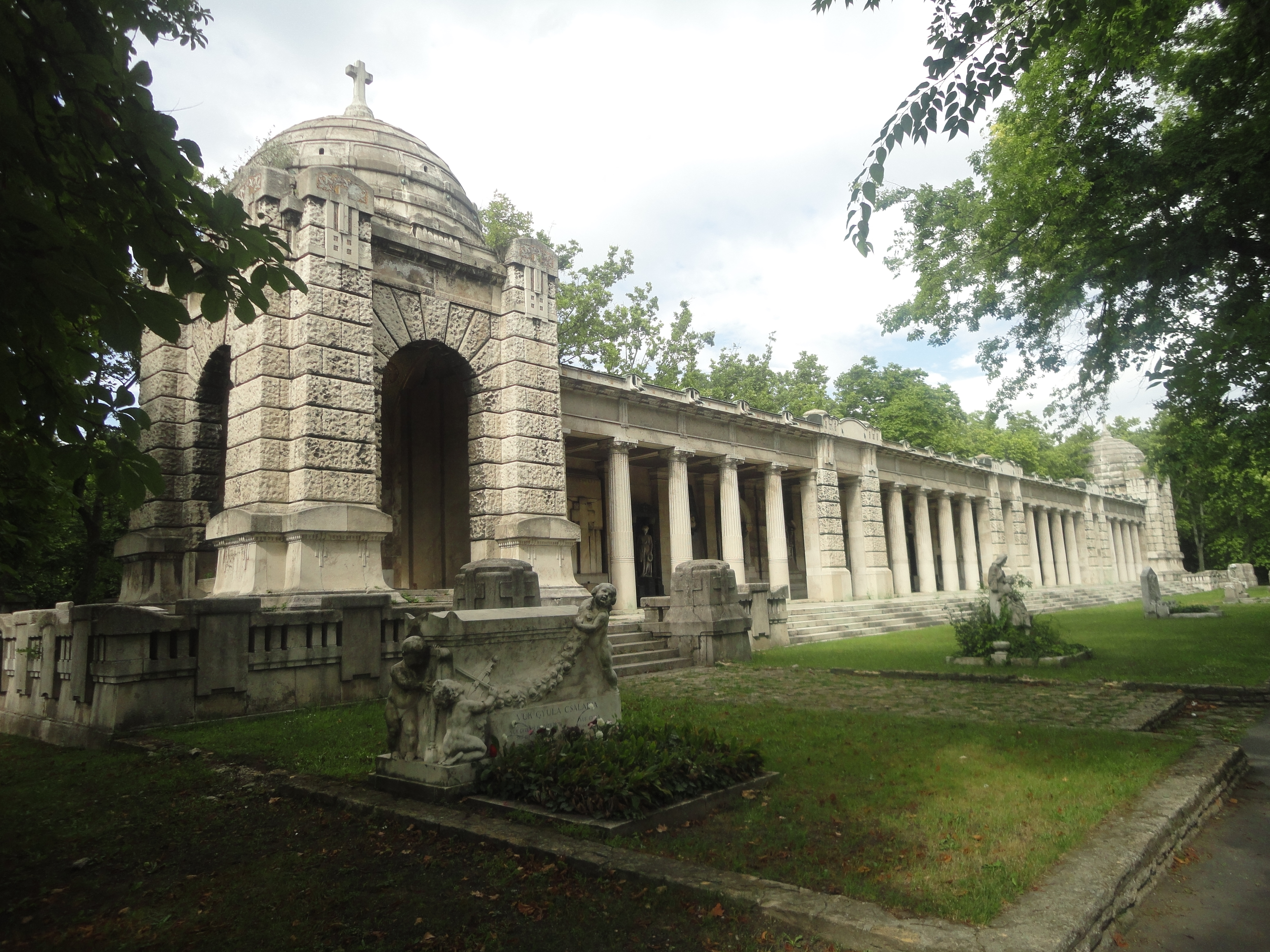
Arcade row, Fiumei út cemetery

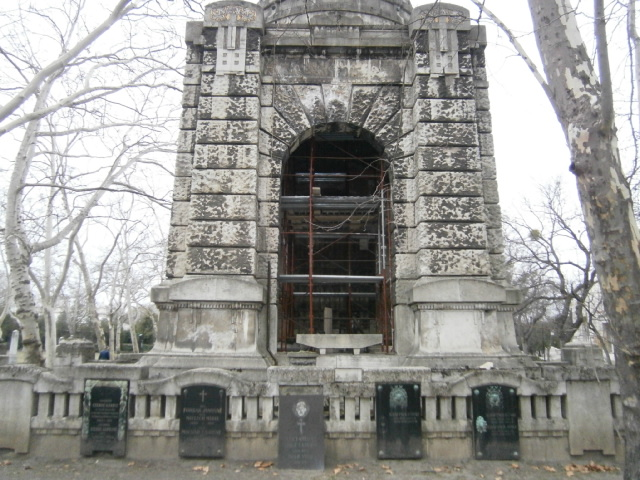
Arcade row, Fiumei út cemetery

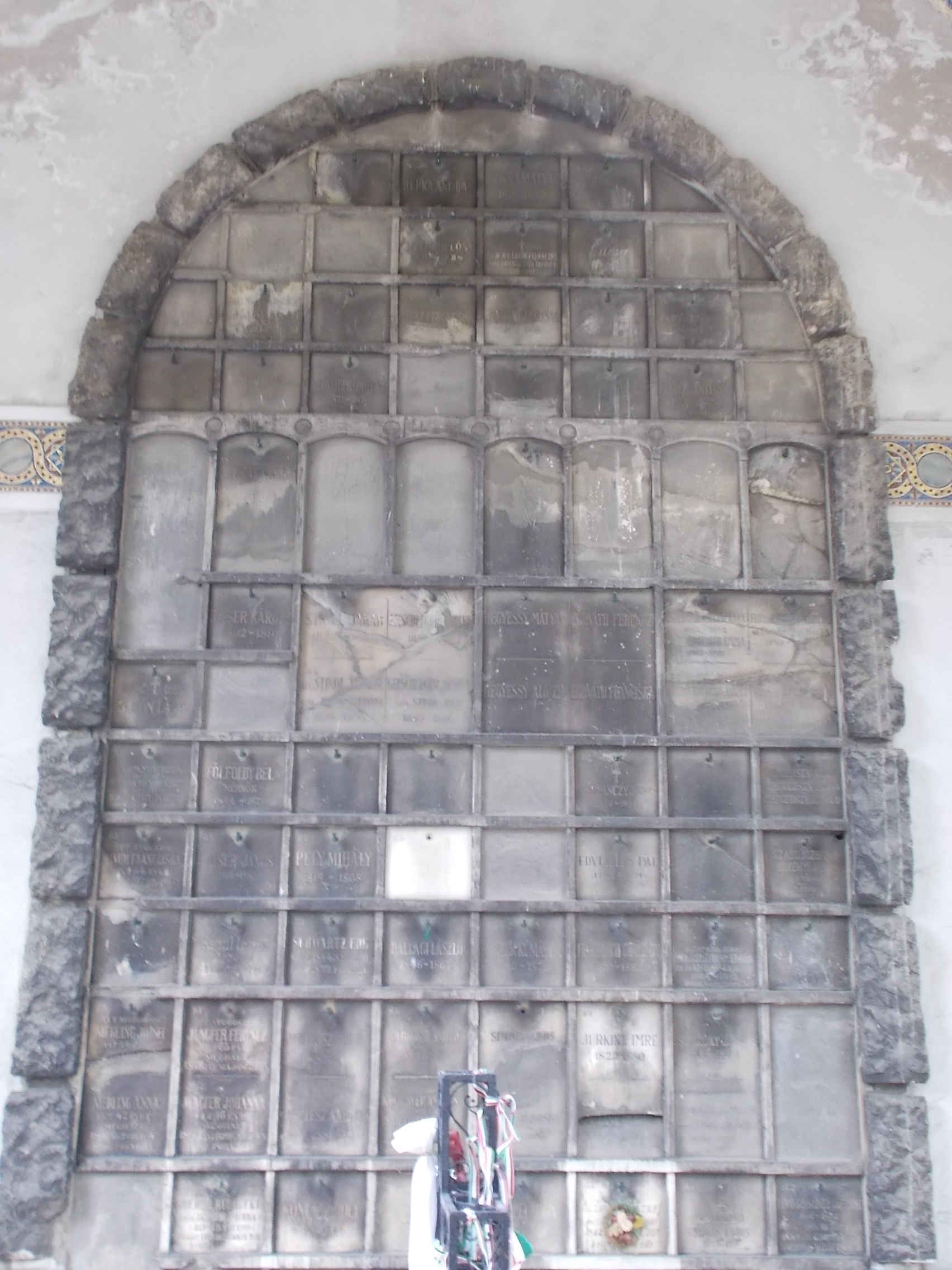
Arcade row, Fiumei út cemetery (urn holders)

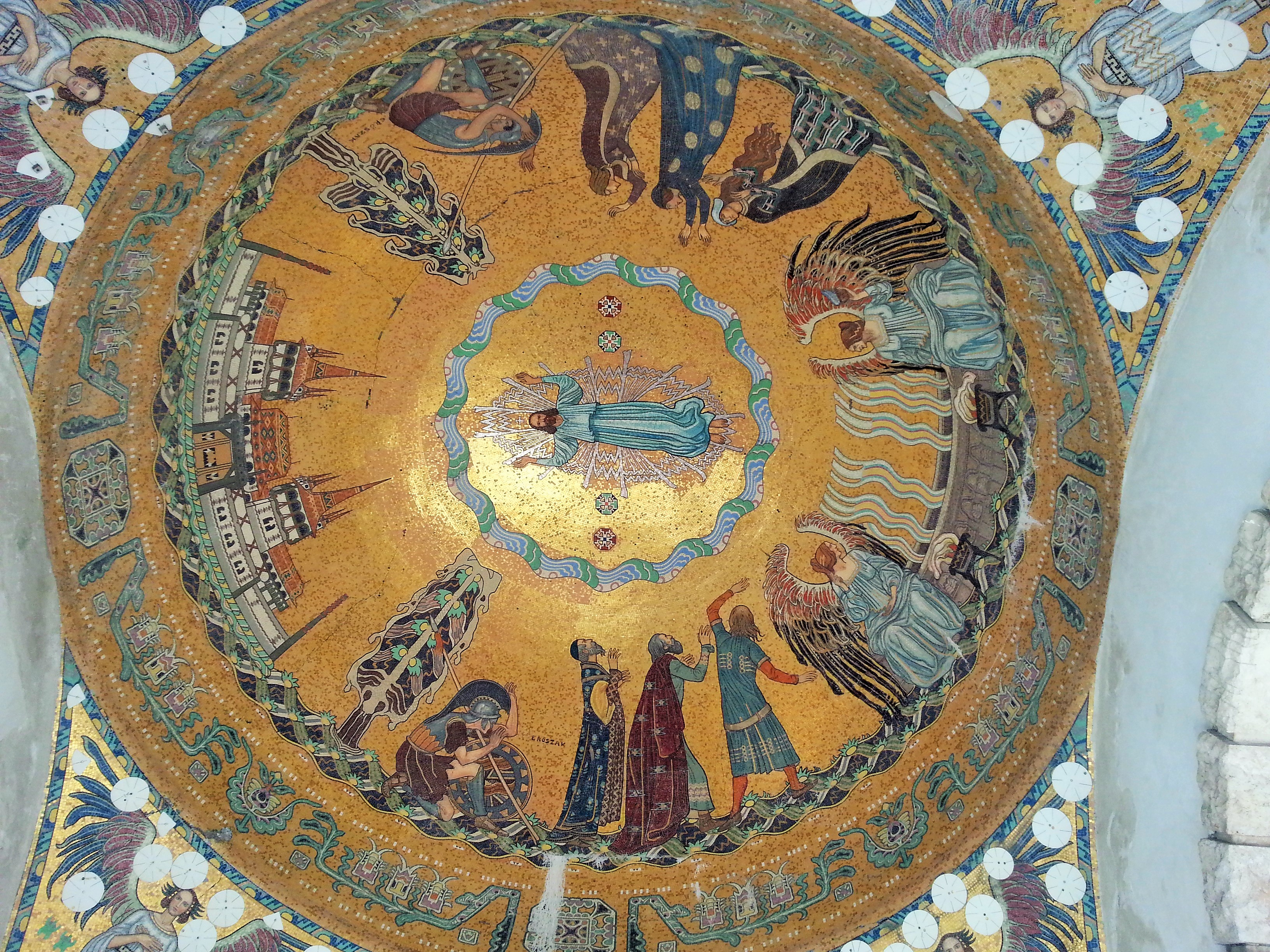
Arcade row, Fiumei út cemetery (dome mosaic)

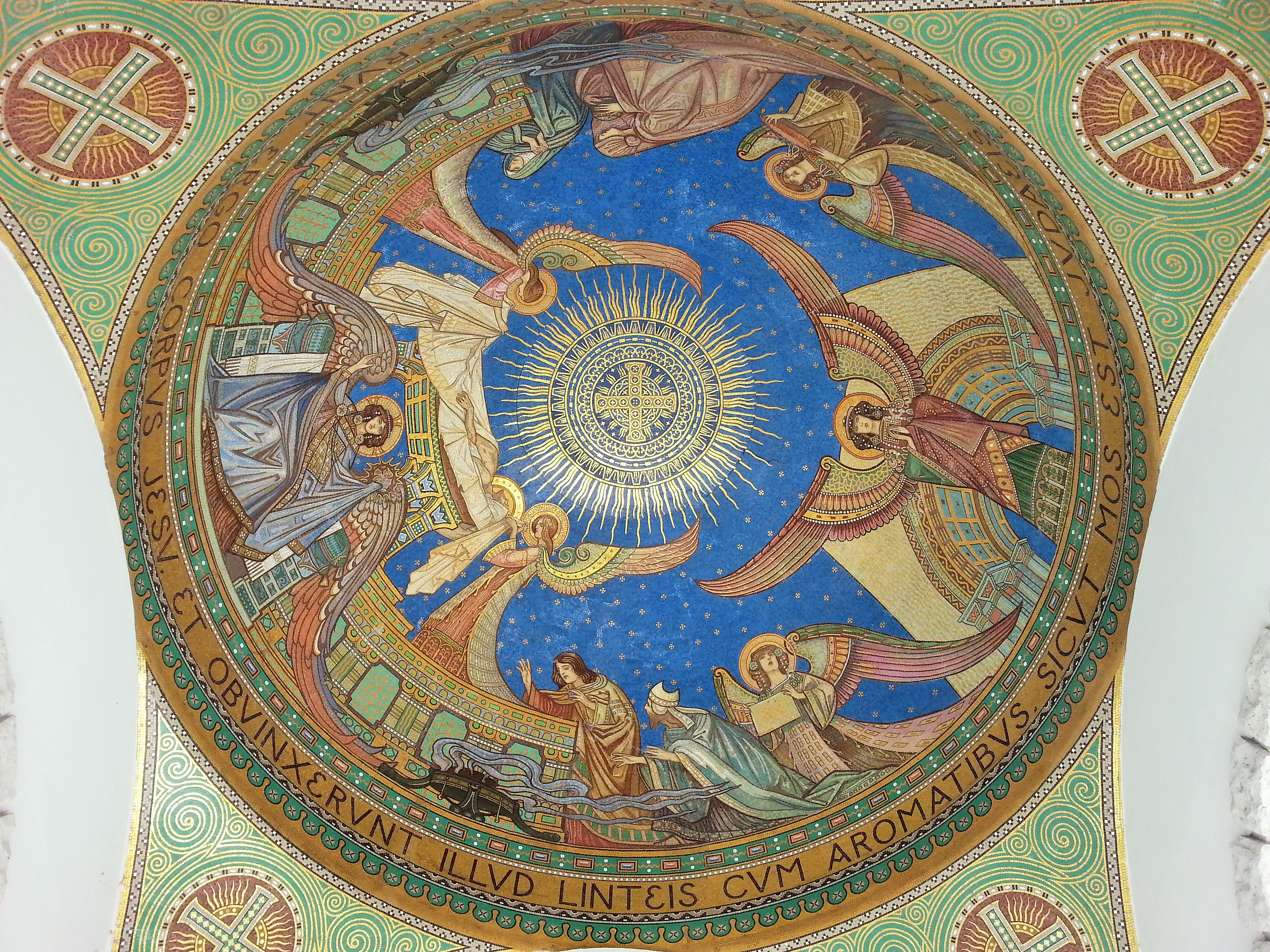
Arcade row, Fiumei út cemetery (dome mosaic)

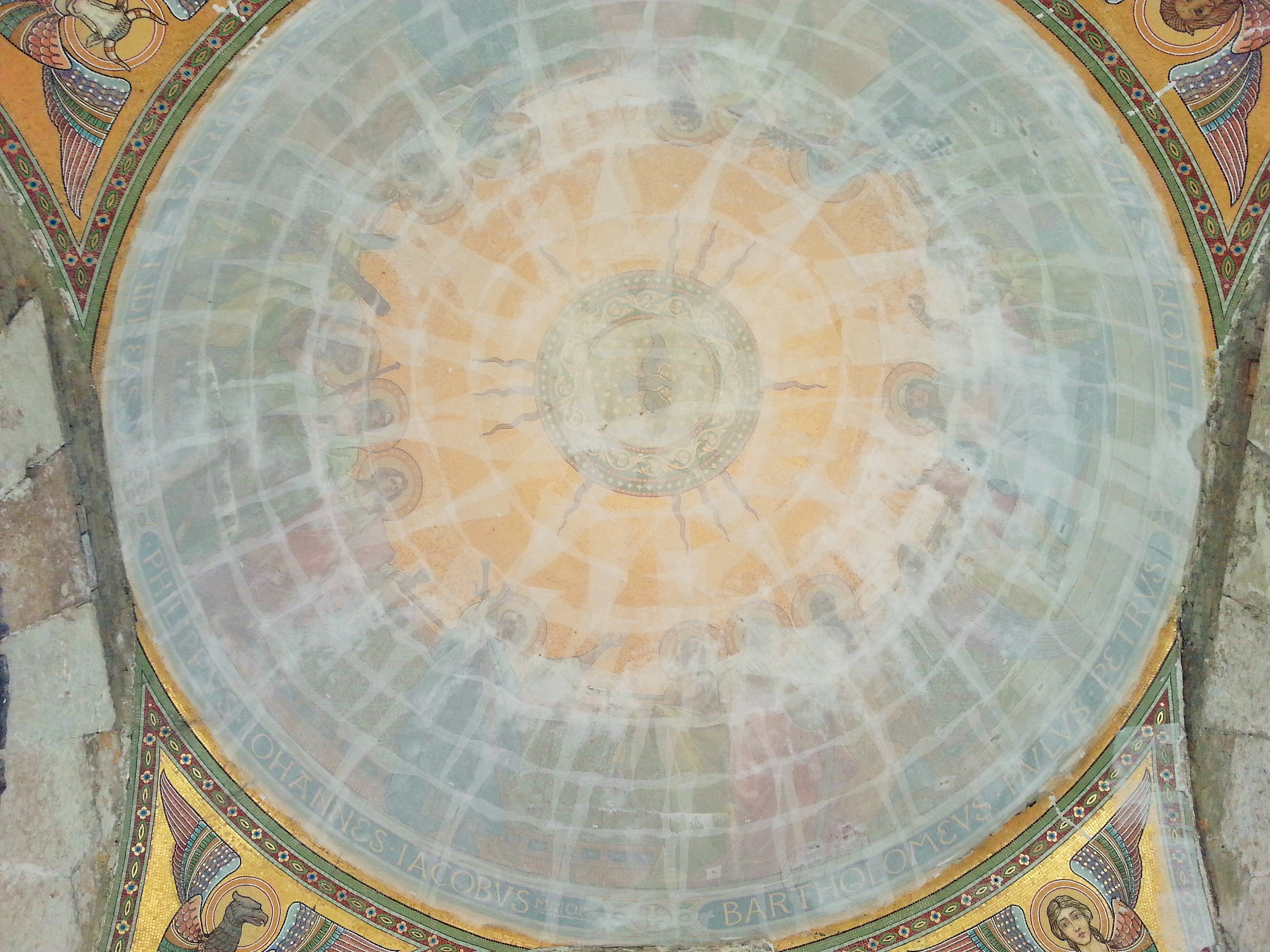
Arcade row, Fiumei út cemetery (dome mosaic)

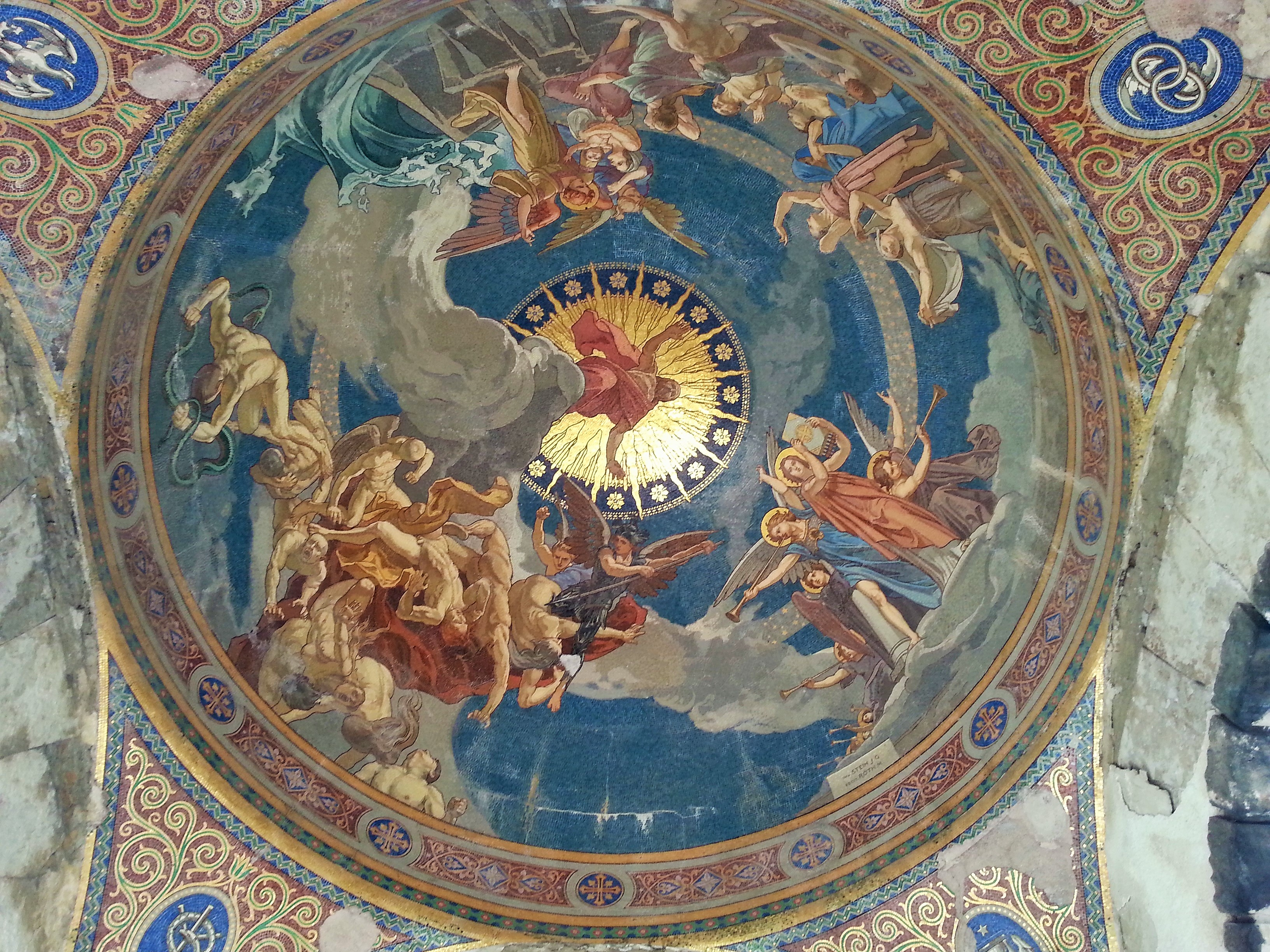
Arcade row, Fiumei út cemetery (dome mosaic)

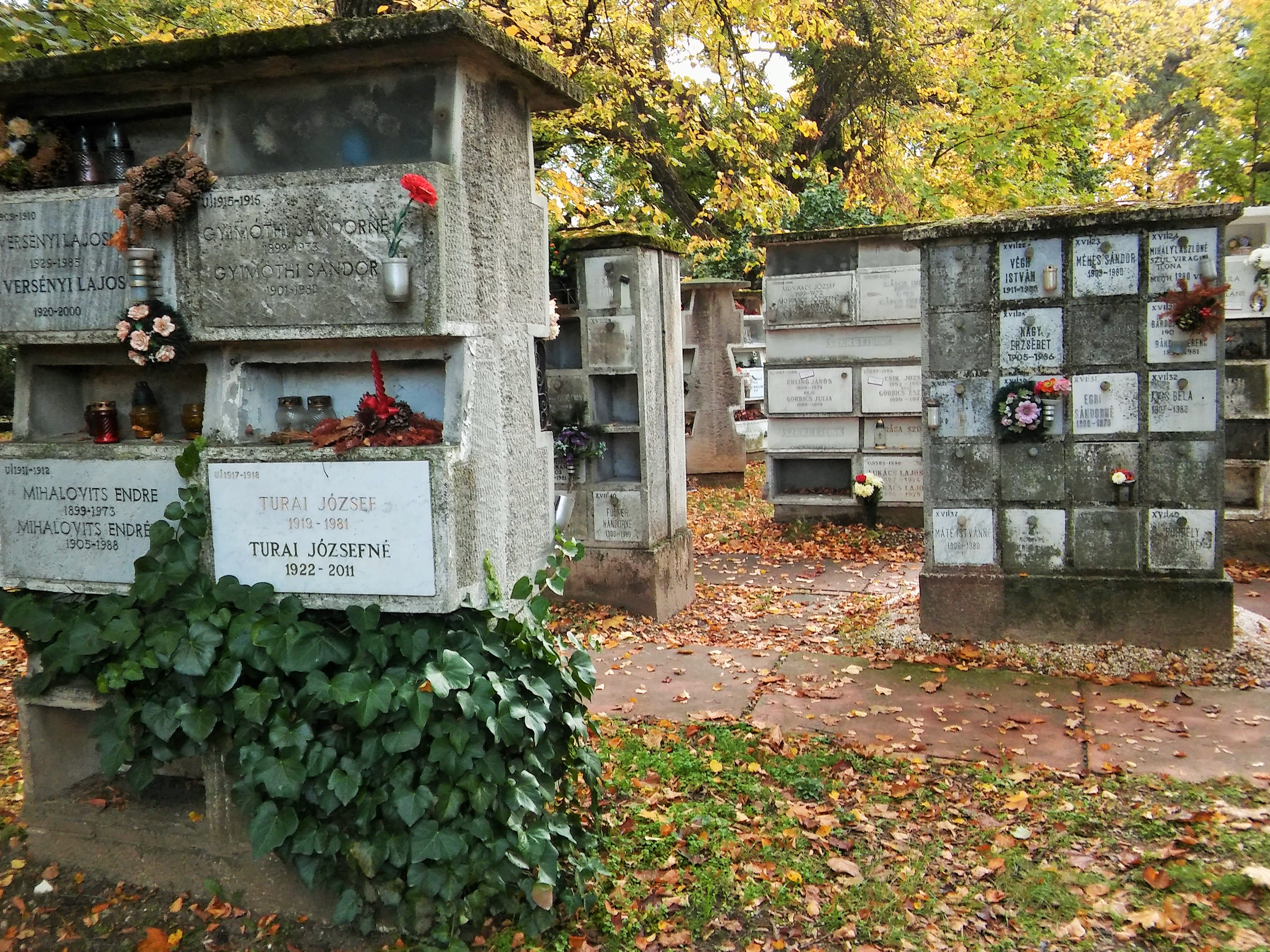
Urns, New public cemetery

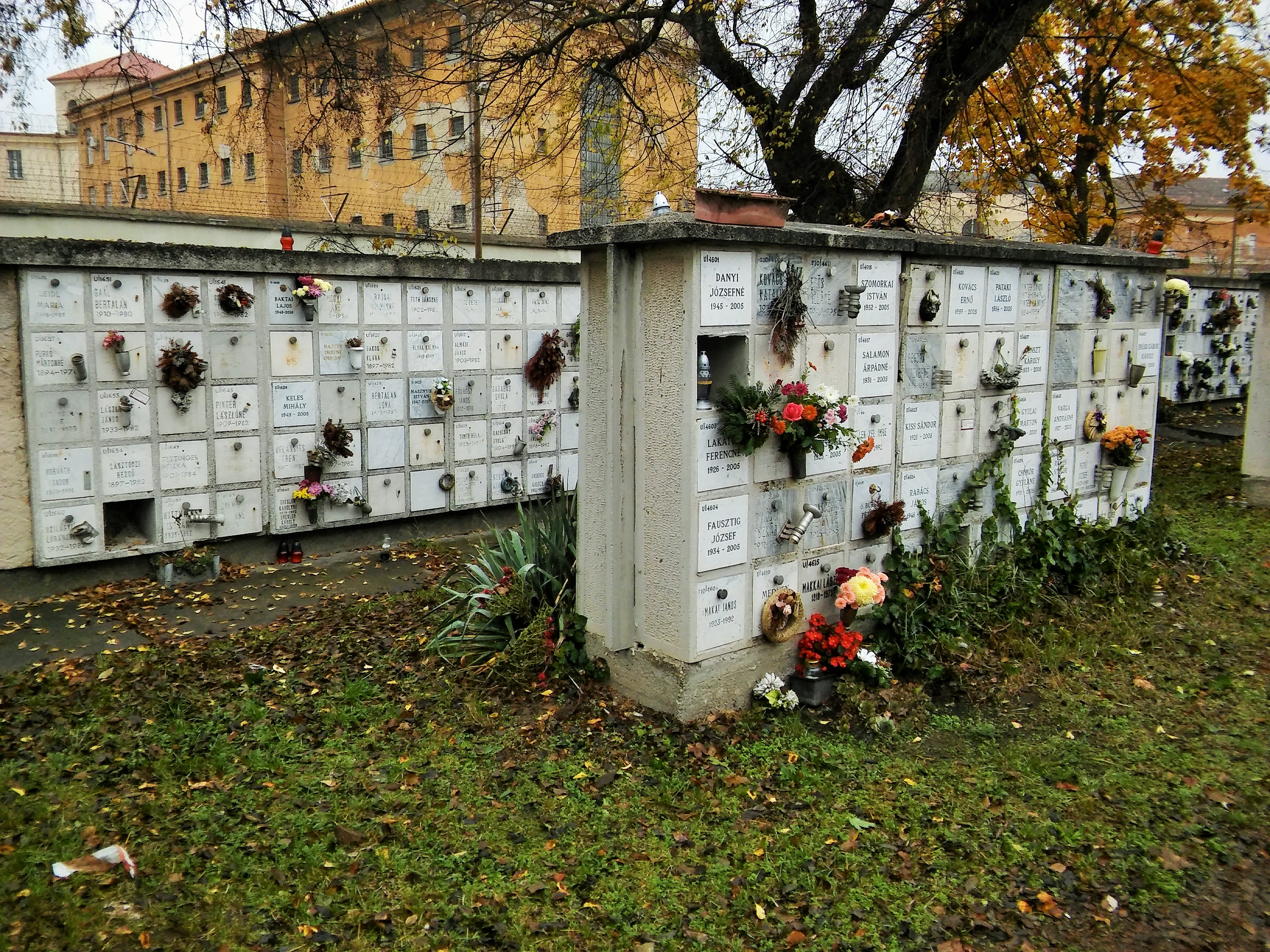
Urns, New public cemetery

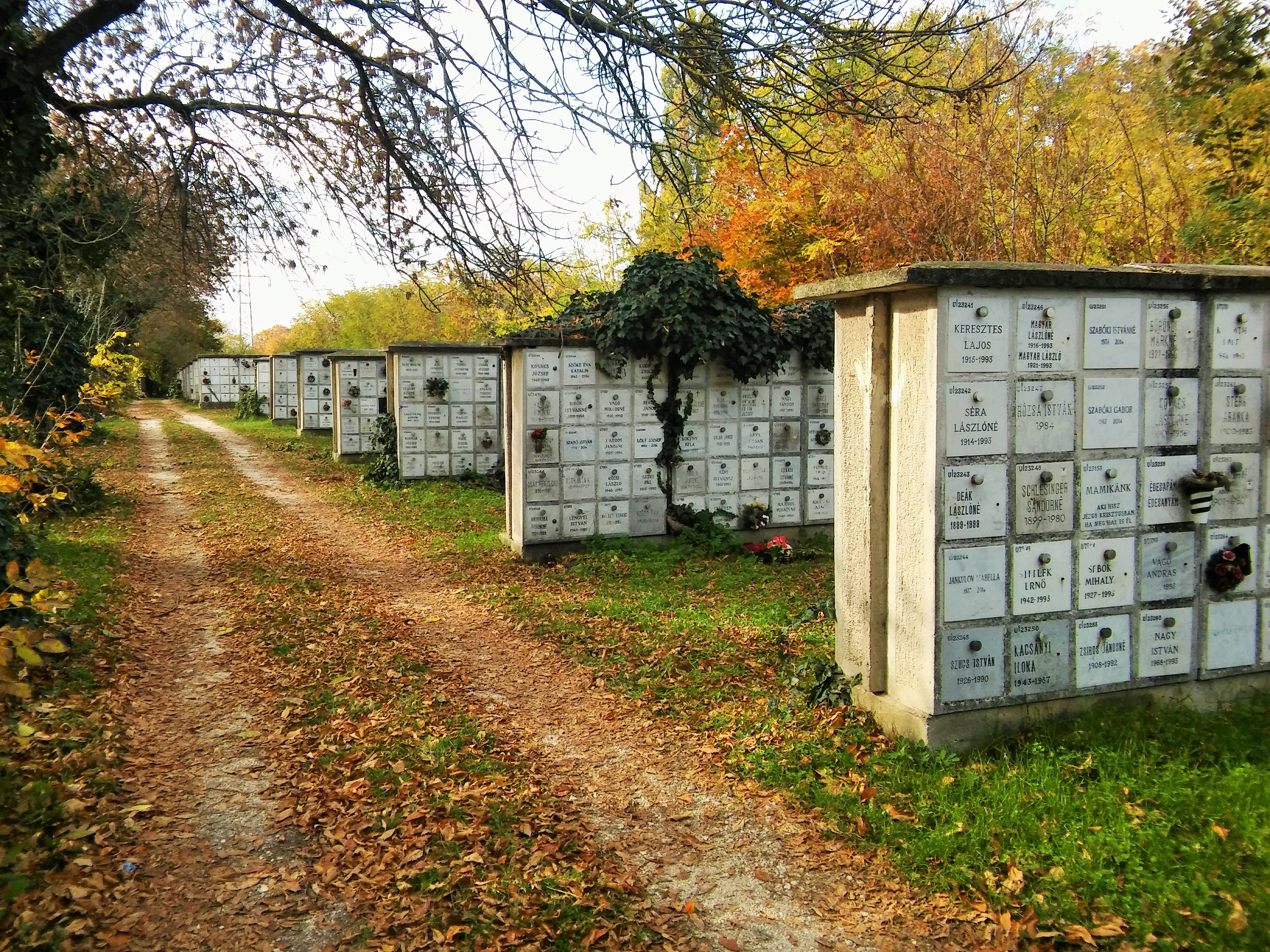
Urns, New public cemetery

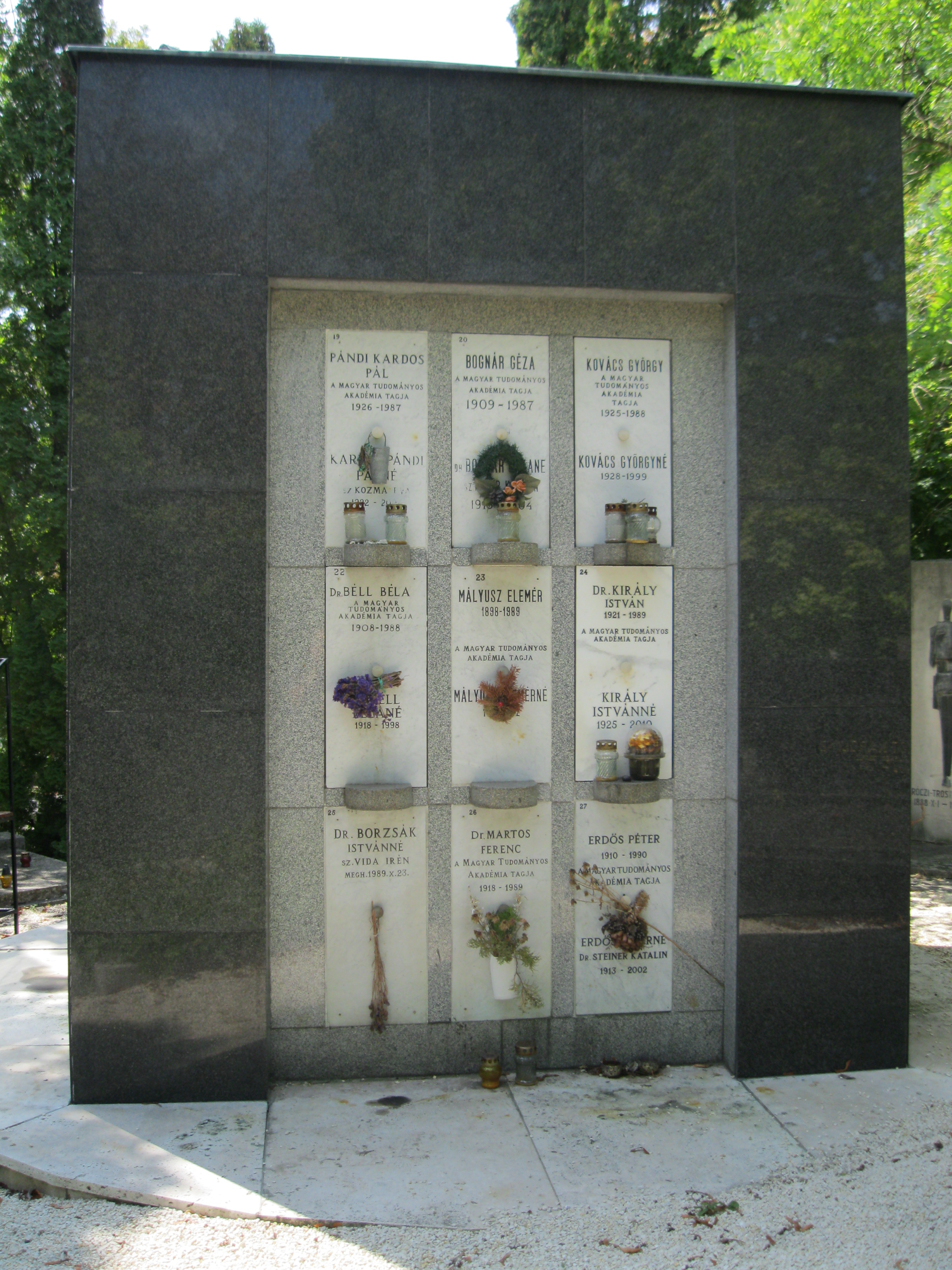
Urn holders, Farkasrét cemetery

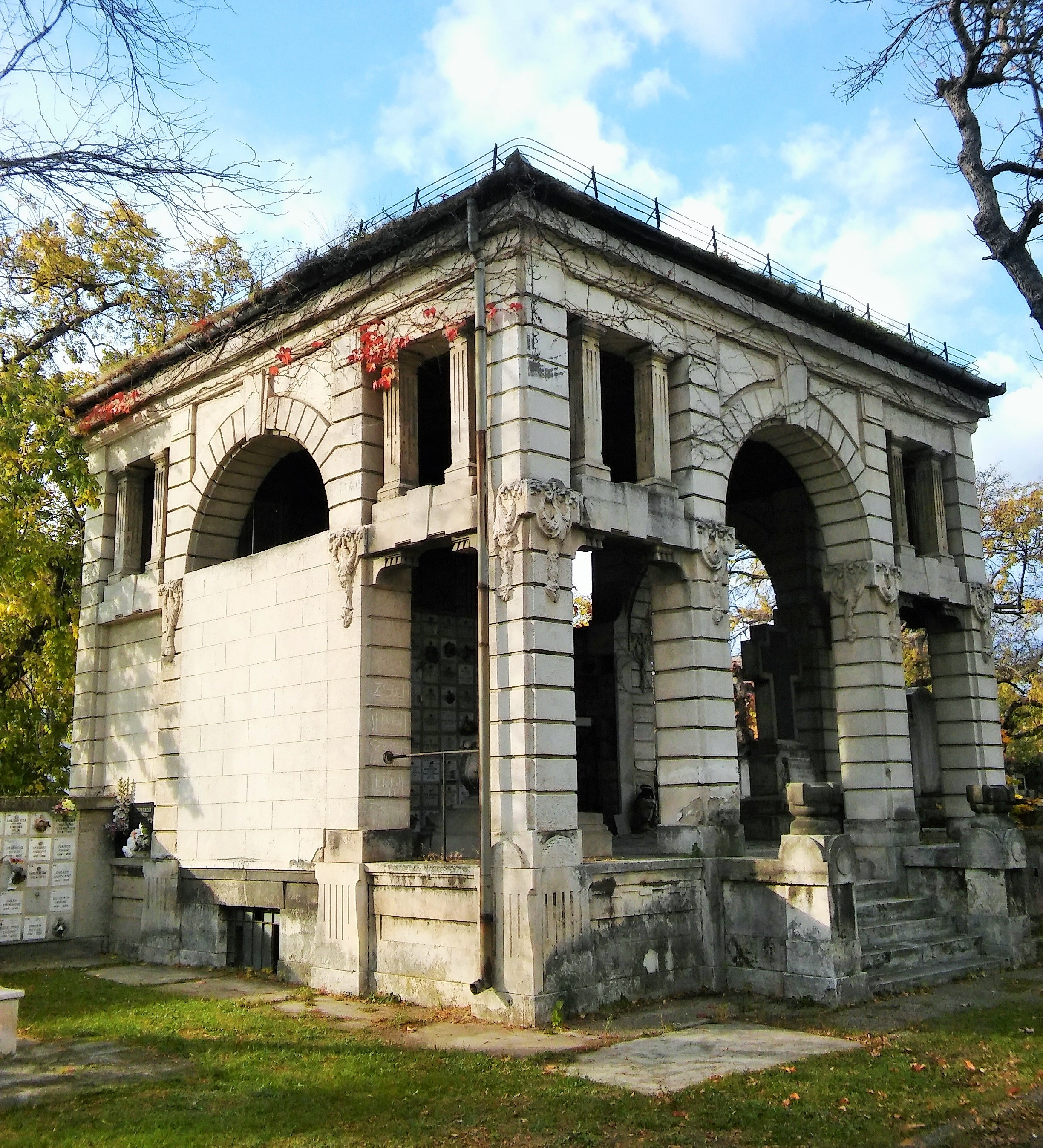
Urn-holding arcades, New public cemetery

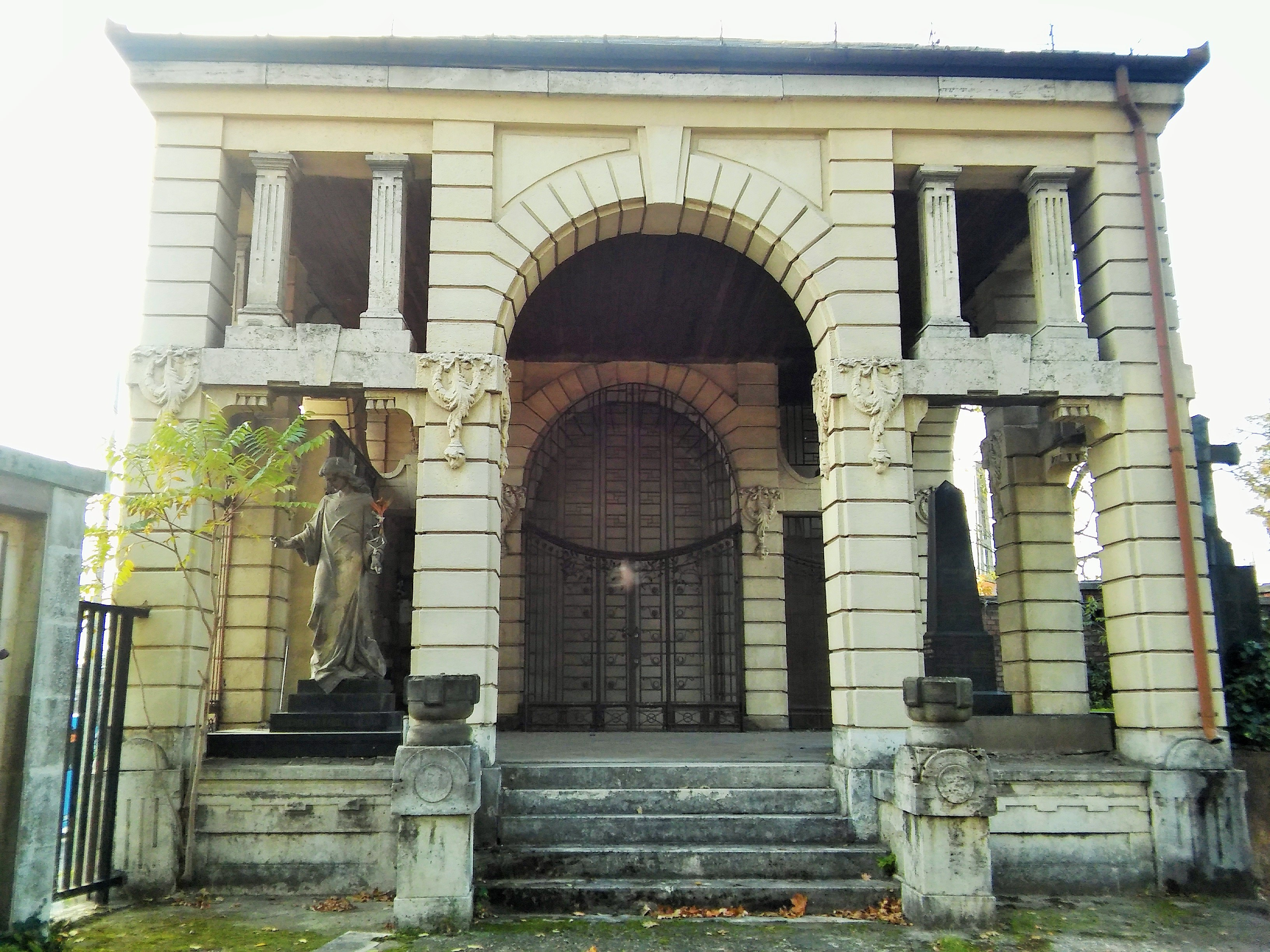
Urn-holding arcades, New public cemetery

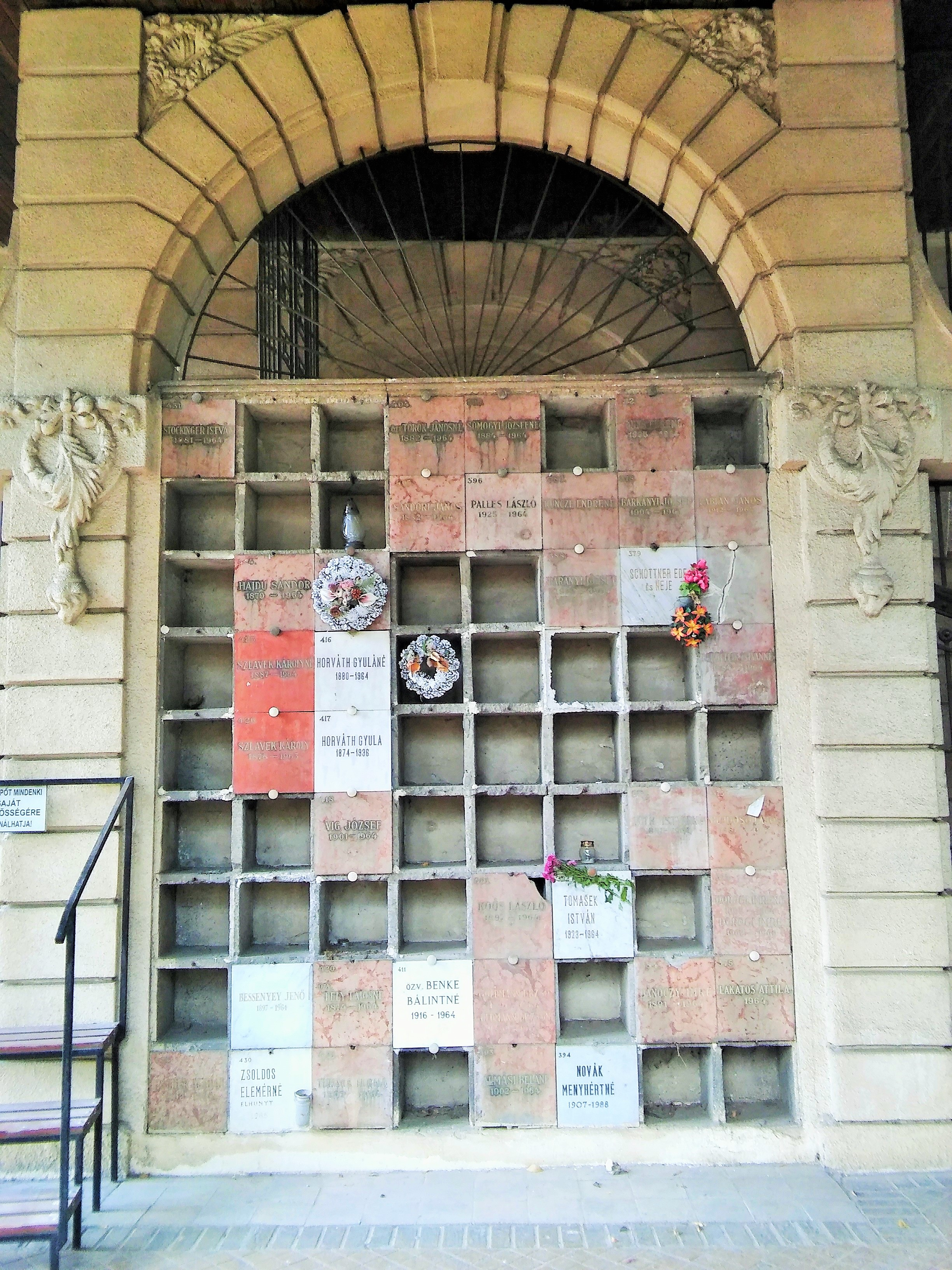
Urn-holding arcades, New public cemetery (interior)

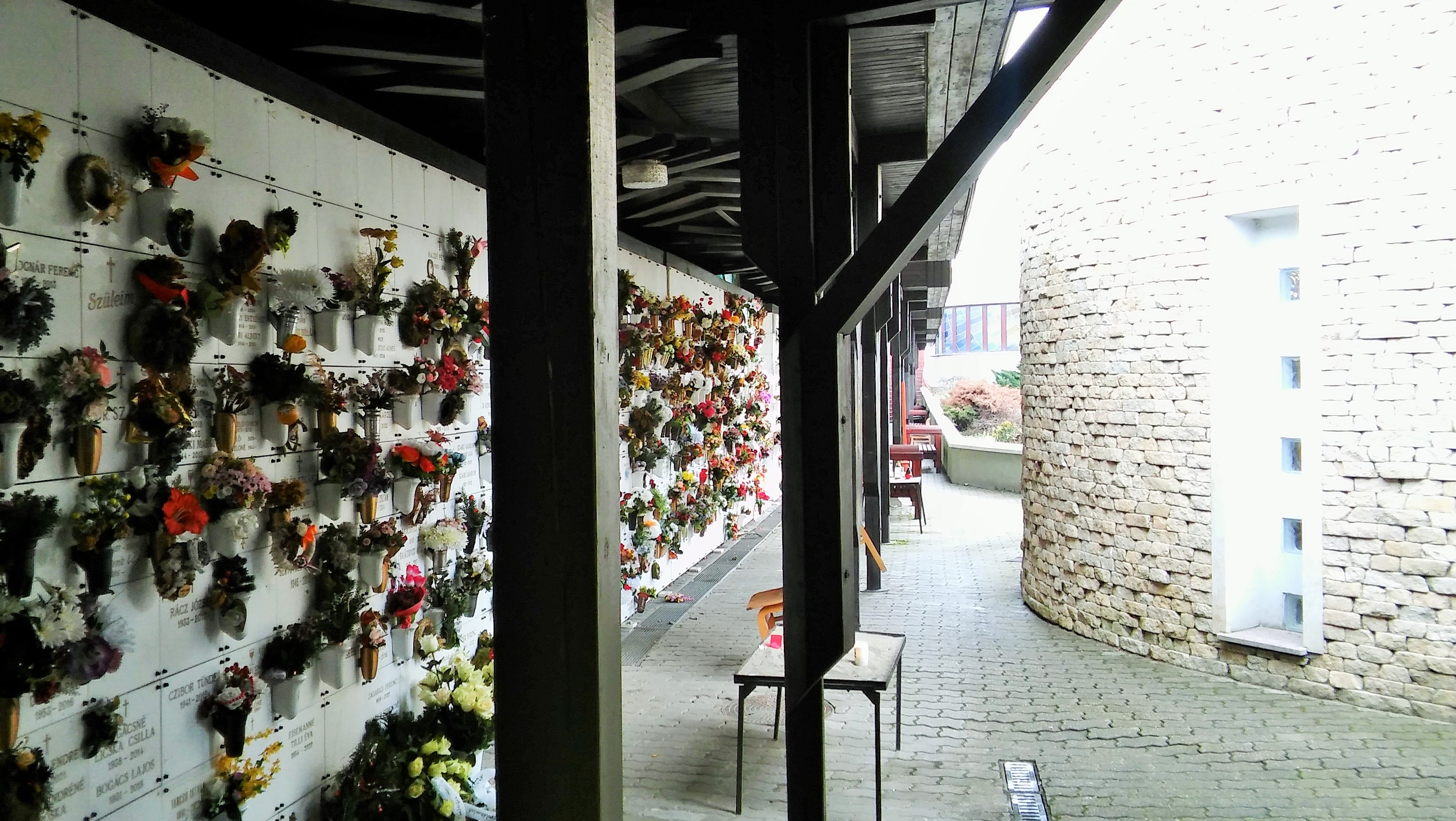
The urn cemetery of the Szent Gellért Parish in Kelenföld

== Entrance buildings ==
Larger entrance buildings were built in two Budapest cemeteries. The entrance building of the Jewish cemetery in Salgótarjáni Street, resembling a medieval castle, was designed by Béla Lajta and built in 1908. The entrance complex of the New Public Cemetery consists of 3 buildings: a tower-like central part, on the front of which is a statue of God with the Latin version of the inscription "I am the way, the truth and the life". On both sides of the tower are car and pedestrian roads, and beyond them, in a symmetrical arrangement, two larger office buildings can be seen on the upper part of their facades with paintings on biblical themes. The buildings were designed by Ármin Hegedűs (1903). A larger stone entrance gate with a guard room was built in the Farkasrét cemetery.

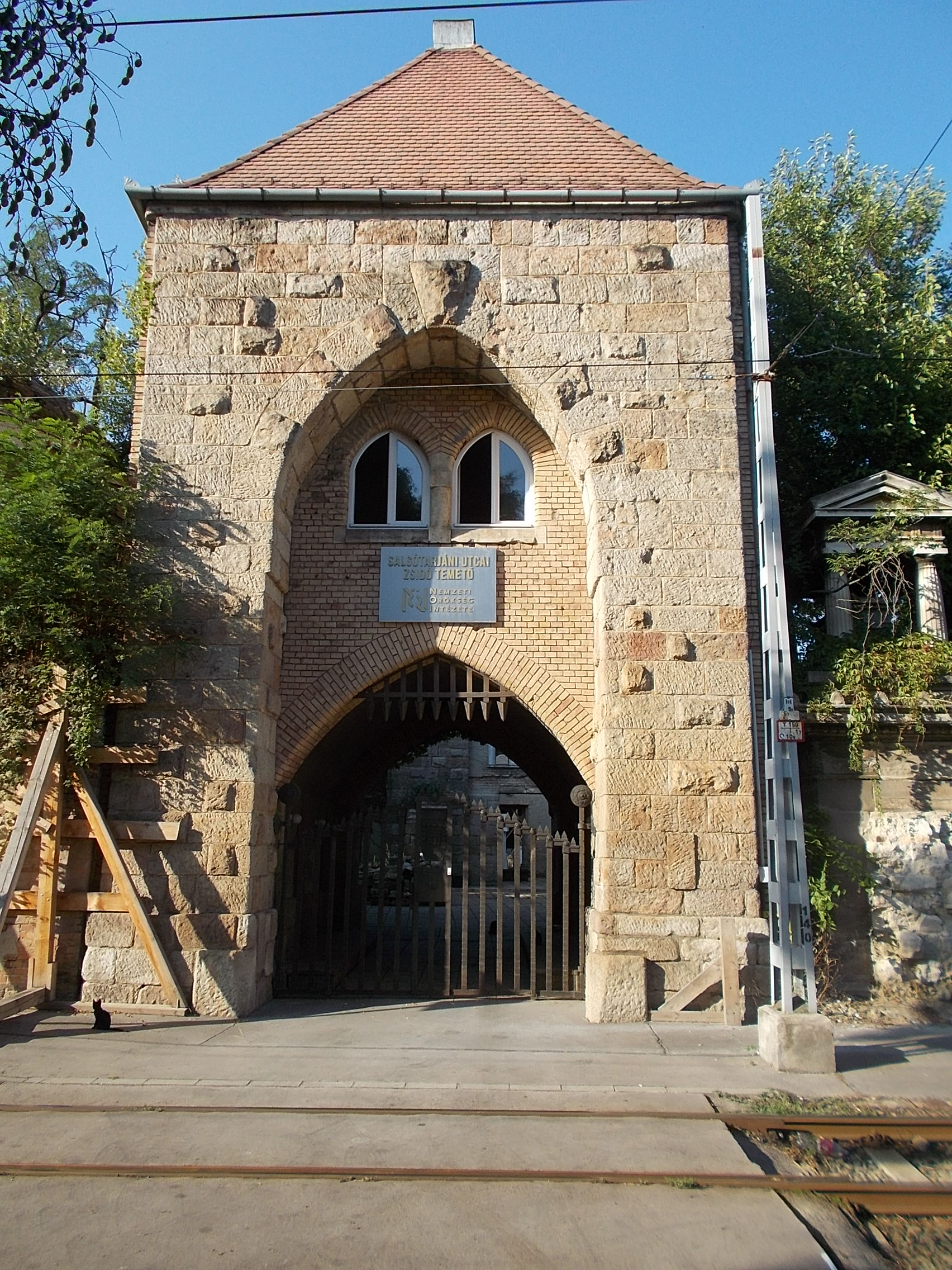
The entrance building of the Salgótarjáni Street Jewish Cemetery

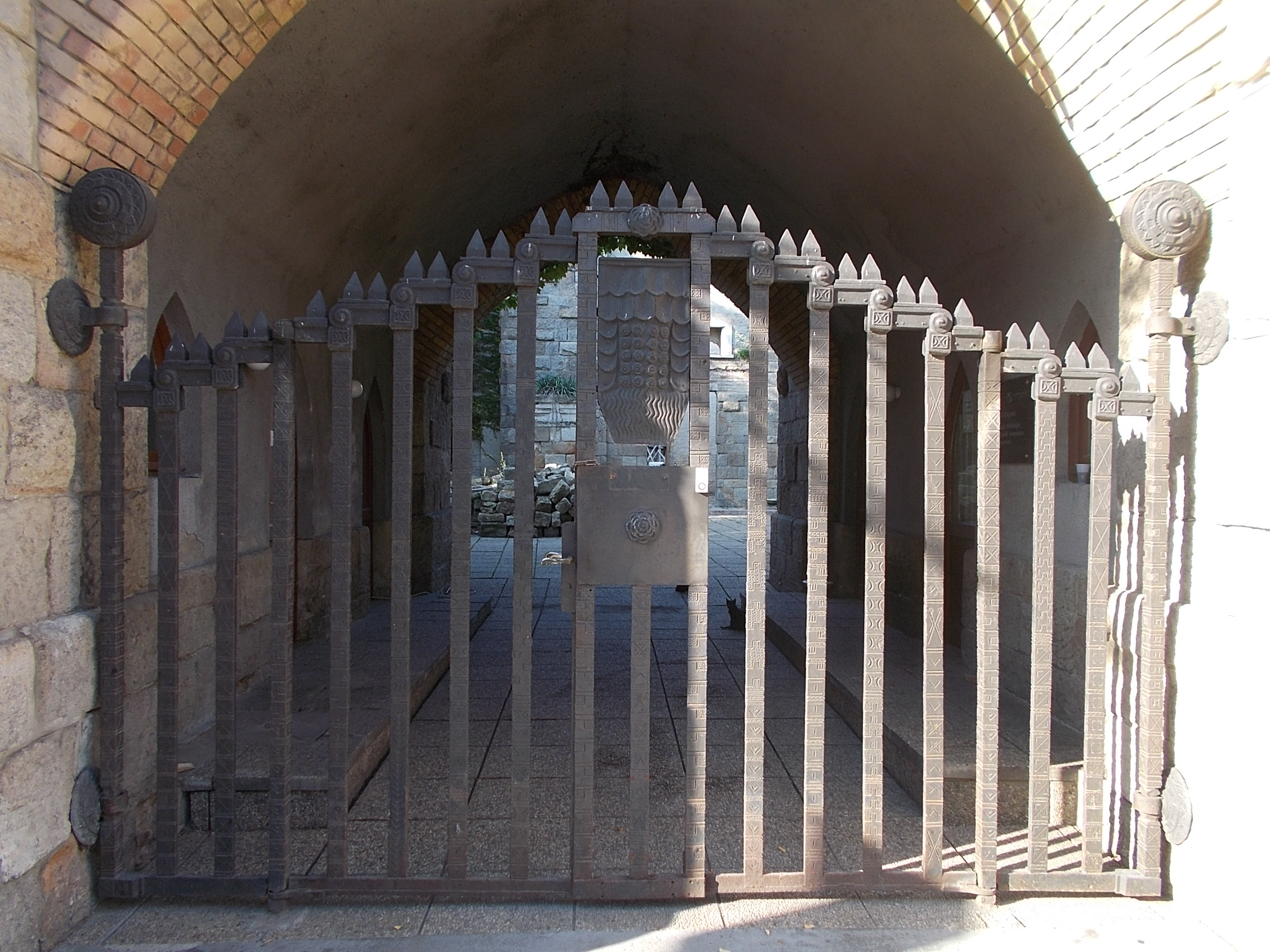
The entrance building of the Salgótarjáni Street Jewish Cemetery (arched gate)

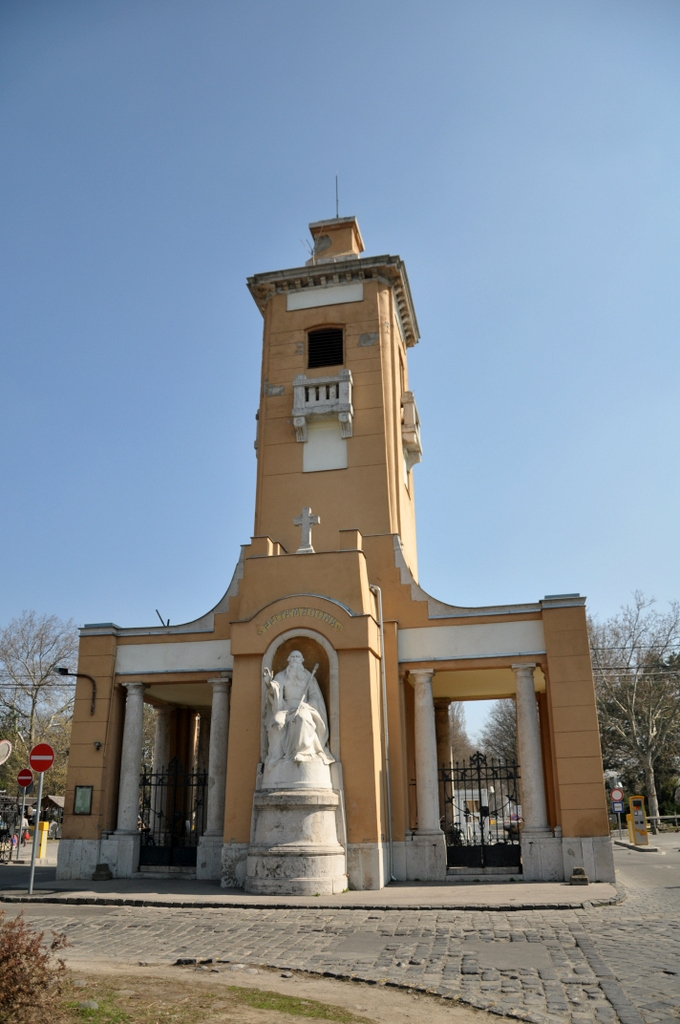
The entrance complex of the New Public Cemetery (main building)

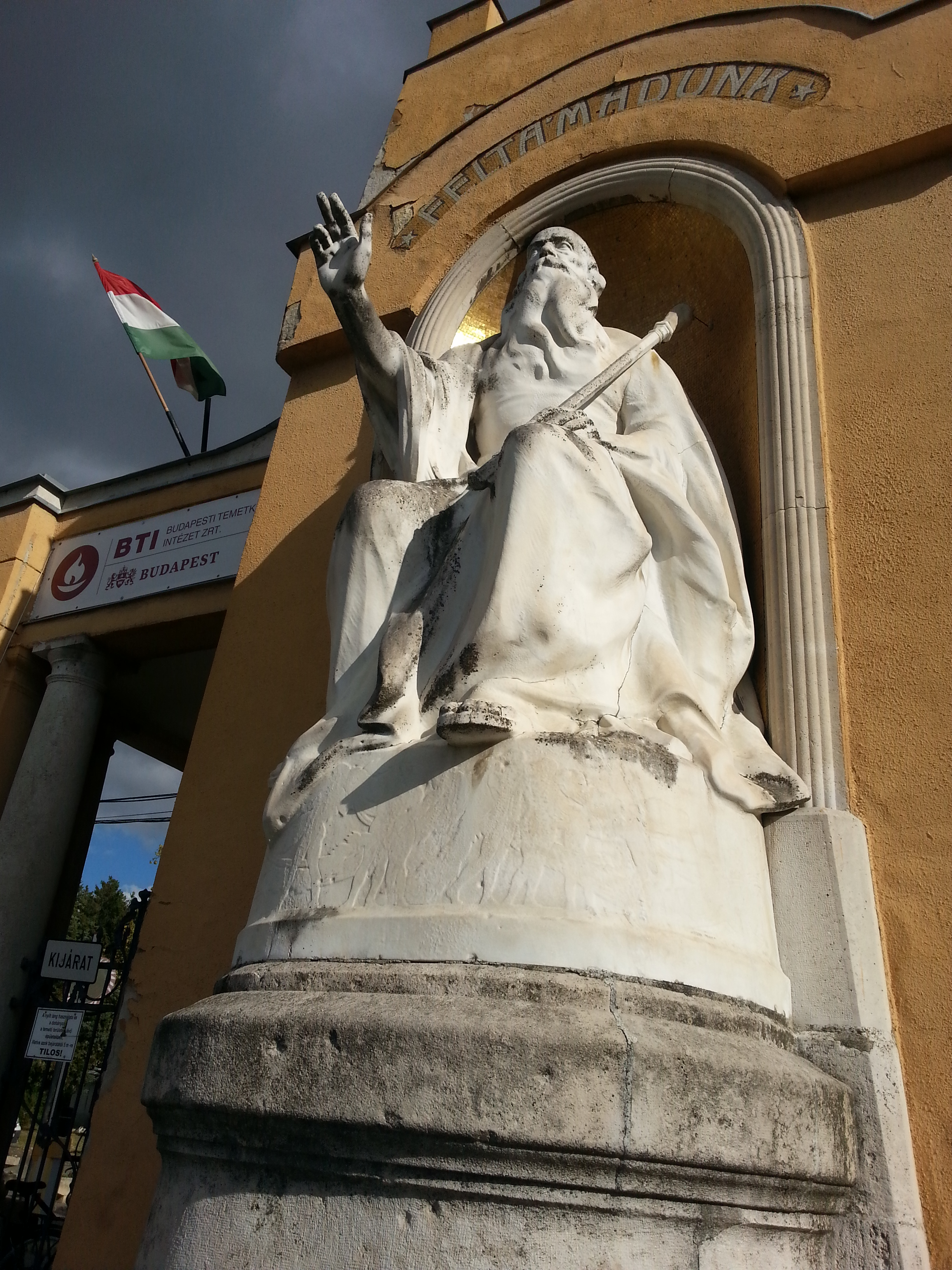
The entrance complex of the New Public Cemetery (close-up of the statue of God)

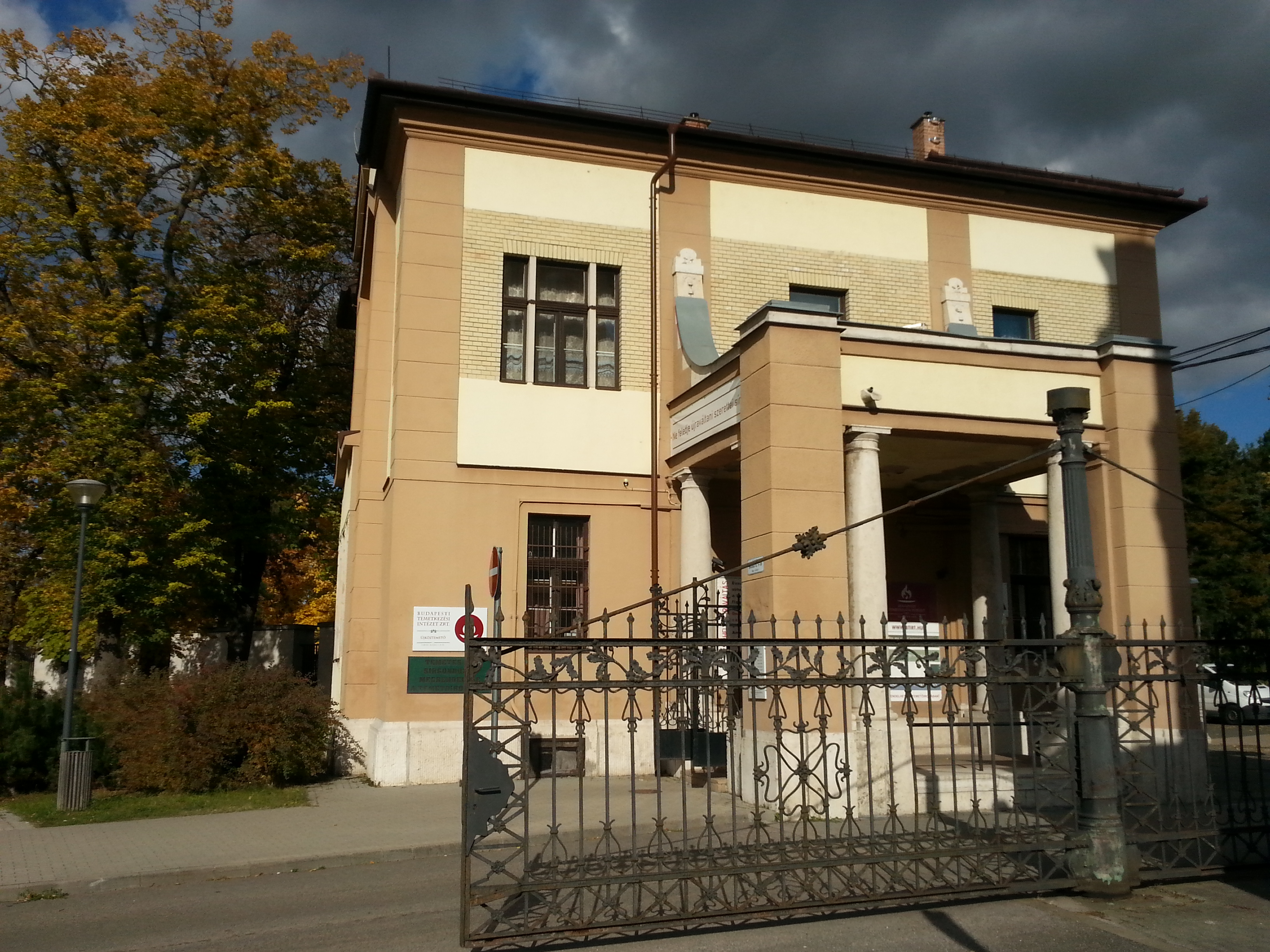
The entrance complex of the New Public Cemetery (outbuilding)

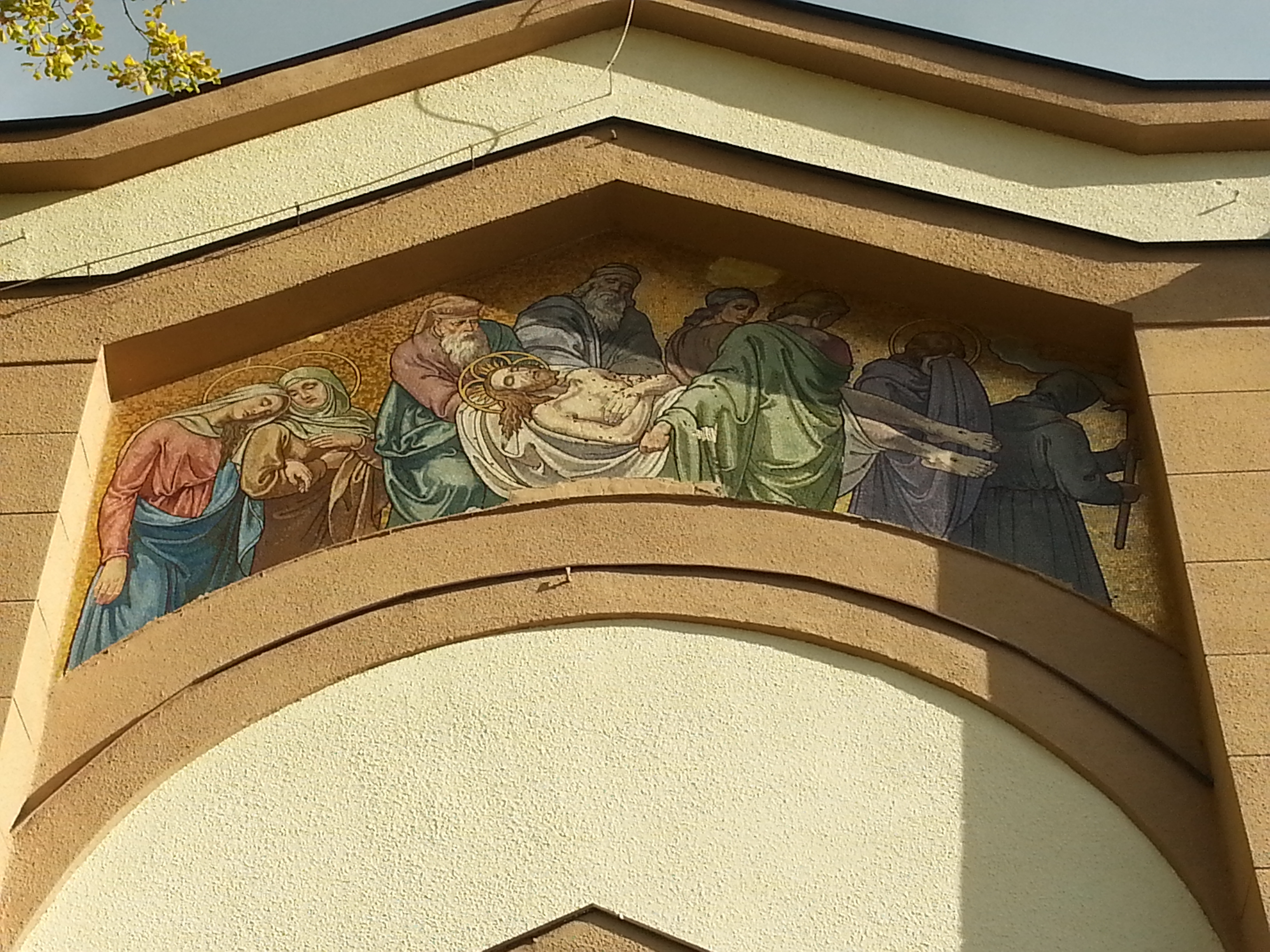
The entrance complex of the New Public Cemetery (painting detail)

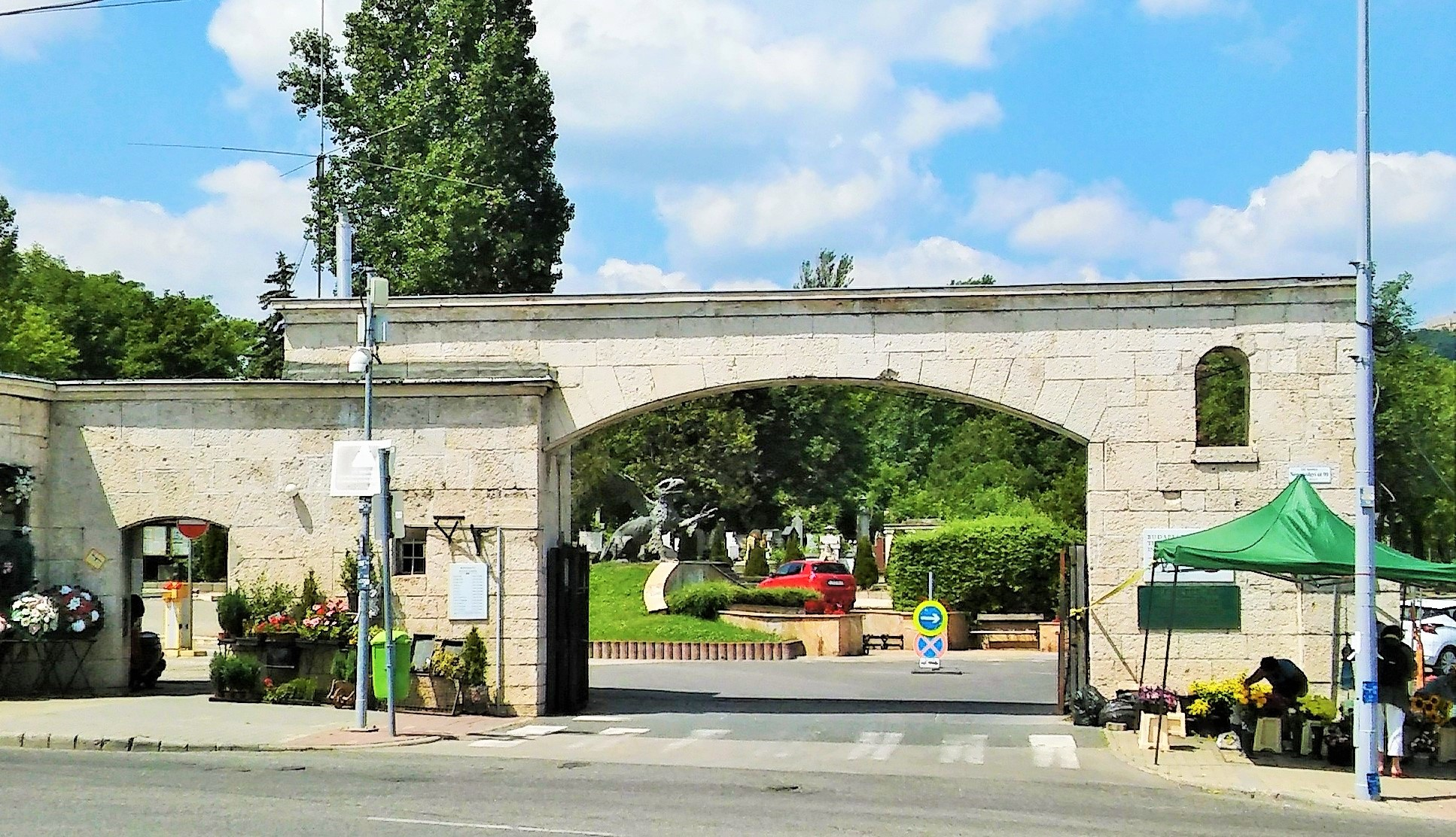
Farkasrét cemetery stone gate

== Undertakers ==
All cemeteries in Budapest have a funeral building/mortuary. Some of these are quite large and built with serious artistic training. The funeral parlor and morgue of the Fiumei Úti Sírkert (Hugó Máltás, 1880) are Neo-Renaissance, the funeral parlor of the Kozma Street Israelite Cemetery (Vilmos Freund, 1891) is Neo-Moorish, the Jewish Cemetery Salgótarjáni Street Funeral Home (Béla Lajta, 1908) is Art-Deco-Neomesopotamian, the New Public Cemetery funeral home and morgue (Sándor Wossala, 1920–1925) was built in neoclassical style. The mortuary of the Puritan-decorated Gránátos utca Israelite cemetery (designer unknown, c. 1927) and the Farkasrét Israelite cemetery (designer unknown, c. 1895) are very similar, the former with a plastered, the latter with a raw brick facade. Similar to the previous two, but much smaller than them, the mortuary of the Táborhegyi Jewish cemetery (designer unknown, c. 1888) at the intersection of Bécsi út and Laborc utca, which has now been liquidated. The building was renovated, and today it functions as an office.

It is interesting that in the Jewish cemetery in Salgótarjáni street there was a funeral home before the Lajta building, which was demolished during the construction of the new facility around 1908. The chapel and mortuary of the Csepel cemetery were demolished in 1970.

The mortuary of the Farkasrét cemetery was designed by Henrik Böhm and Ármin Hegedűs in 1899–1900, but this extremely large, ornate, imposing facility was not built then. The funeral home was completed in 1938 (Virgil Krassói and Ferenc Módos), but its present form was created only in 1975–1977, its designer was Imre Makovecz. The funeral home of the Óbuda cemetery was built in 1930 and expanded in 1999. Nearby is the Óbuda Jewish cemetery, built around 1922, in a classicizing style.

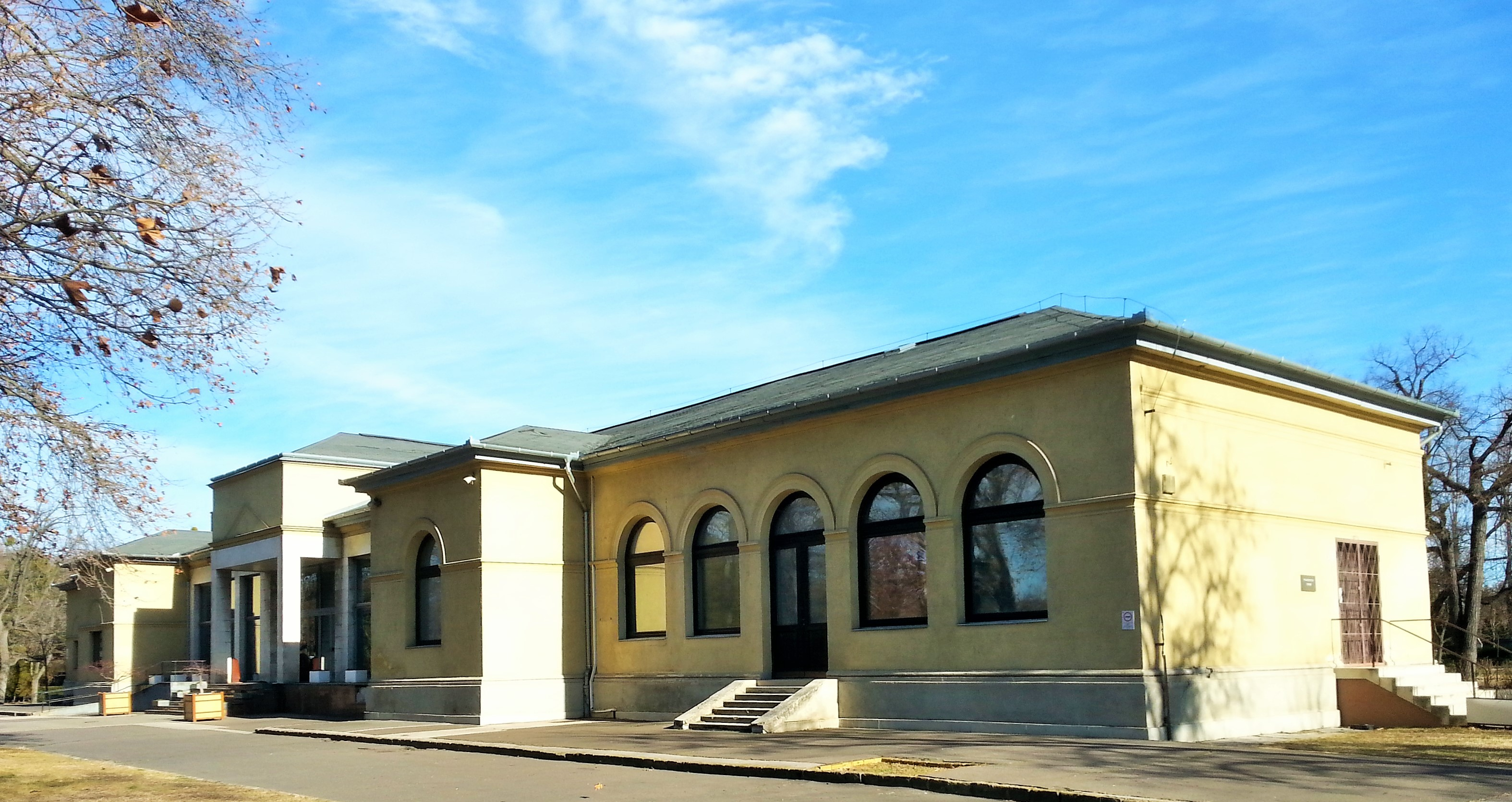
The funeral home and autopsy room of the Fiumei Úti Sírkert

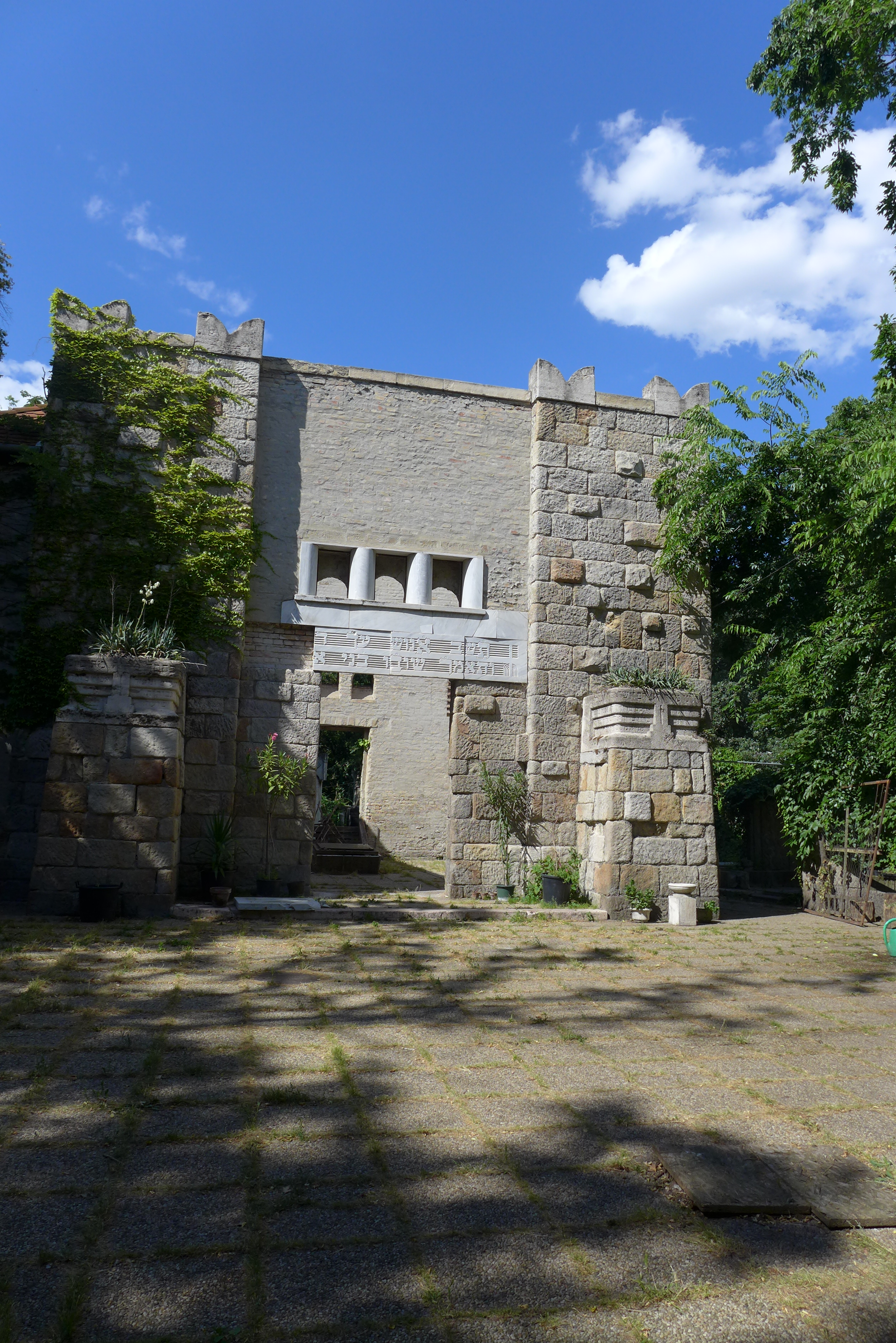
The mortuary of the Salgótarjáni utca Jewish cemetery

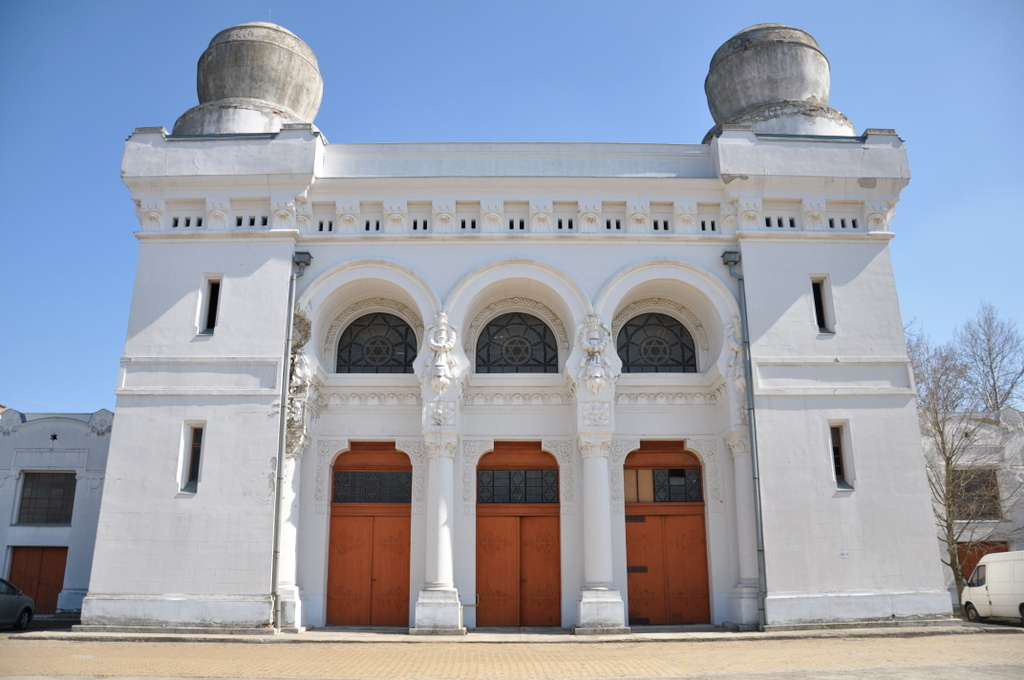
The funeral director of the Kozma Street Israelite Cemetery

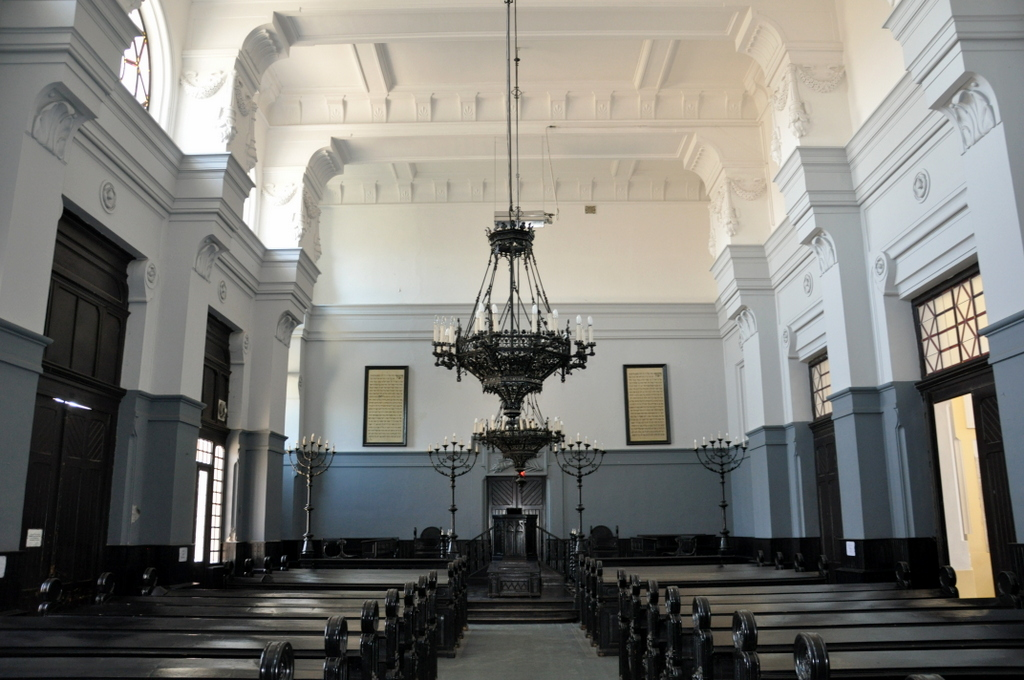
The funeral director of the Kozma Street Israelite Cemetery (interior)

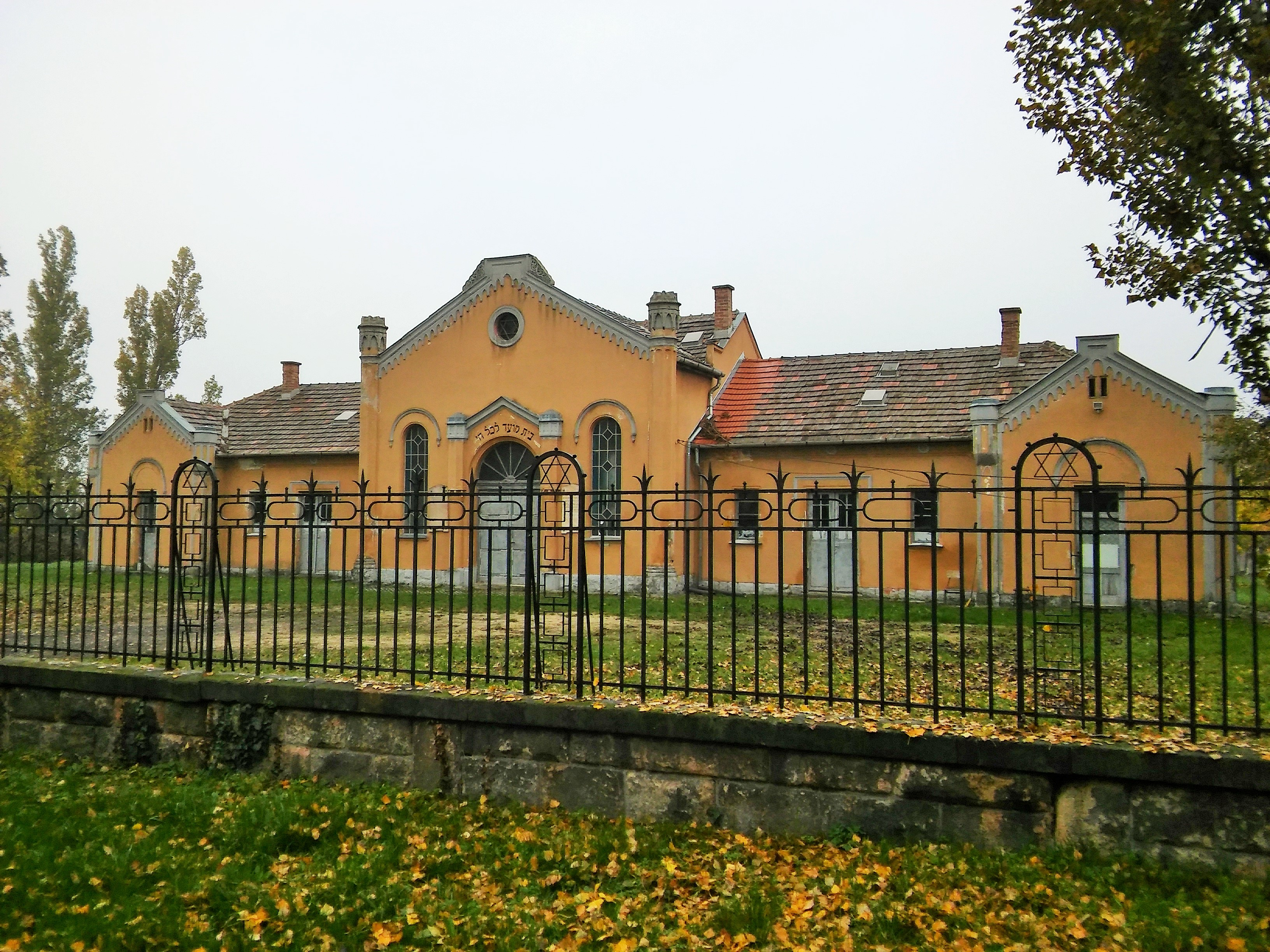
Gránátos utca Israelite cemetery (frontage on Csucsor utca)

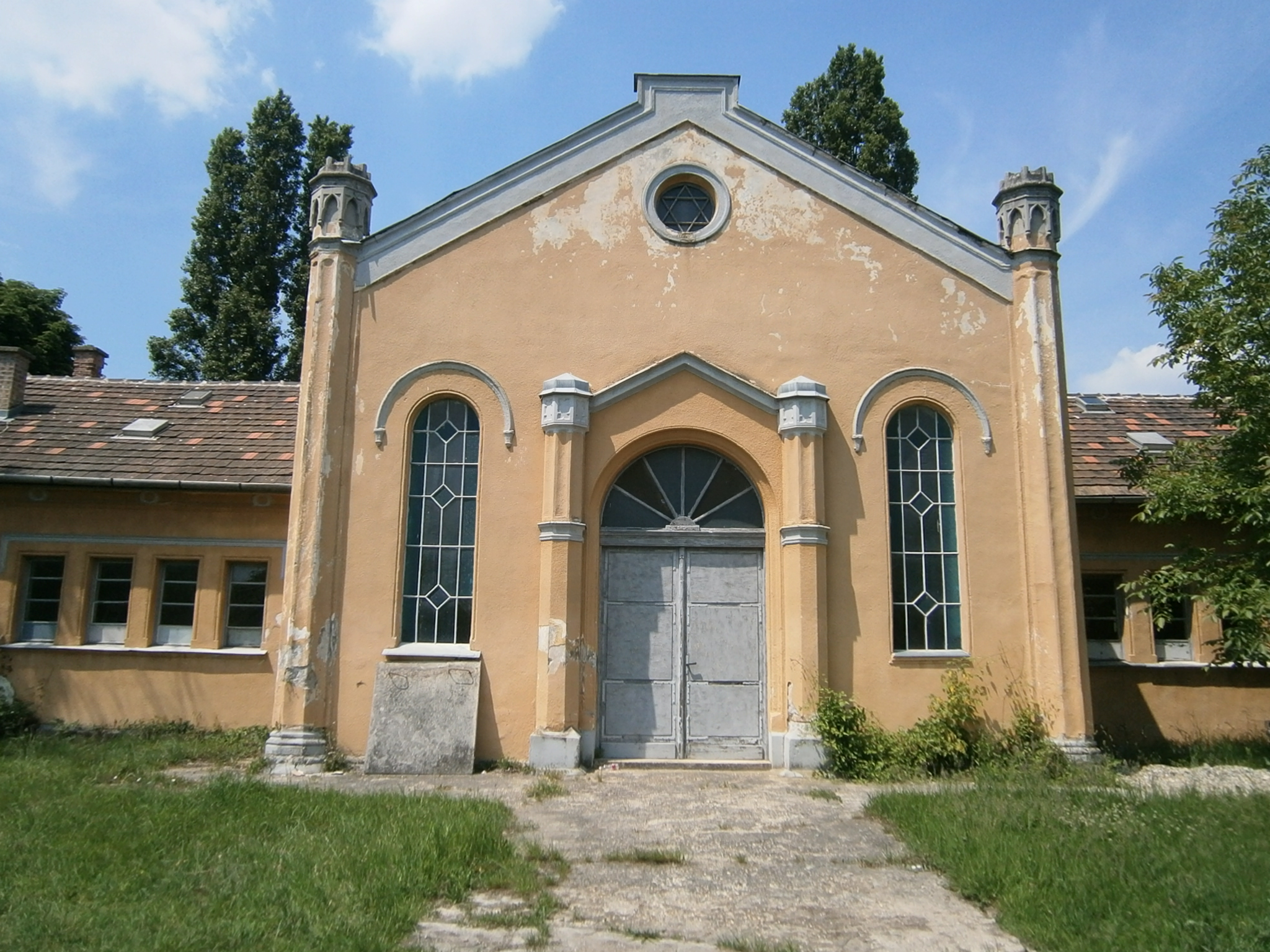
The crematorium of the Gránátos utca Israelite cemetery (cemetery-facing facade)

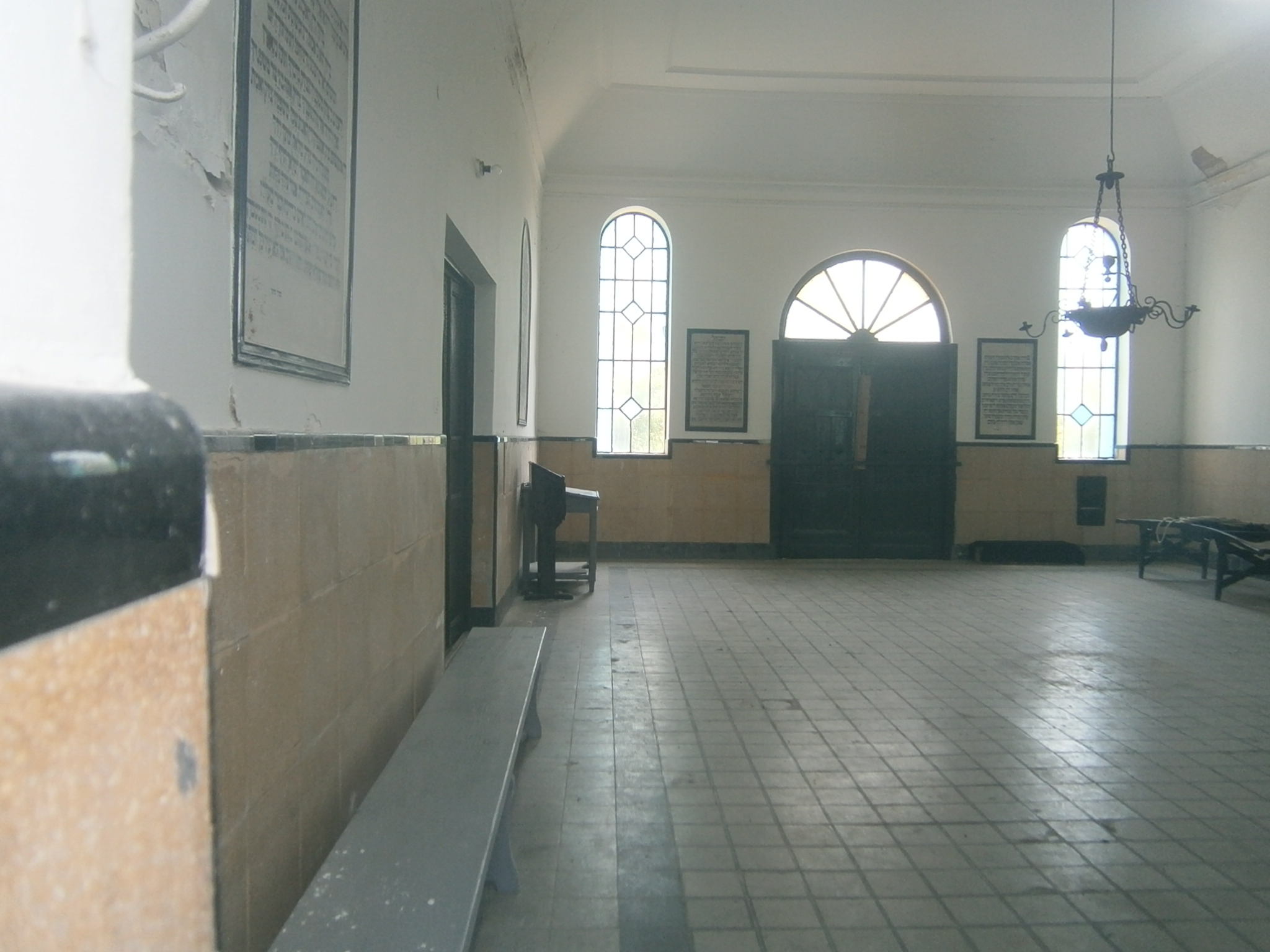
The mortuary of the Gránátos utca Israelite cemetery (interior)

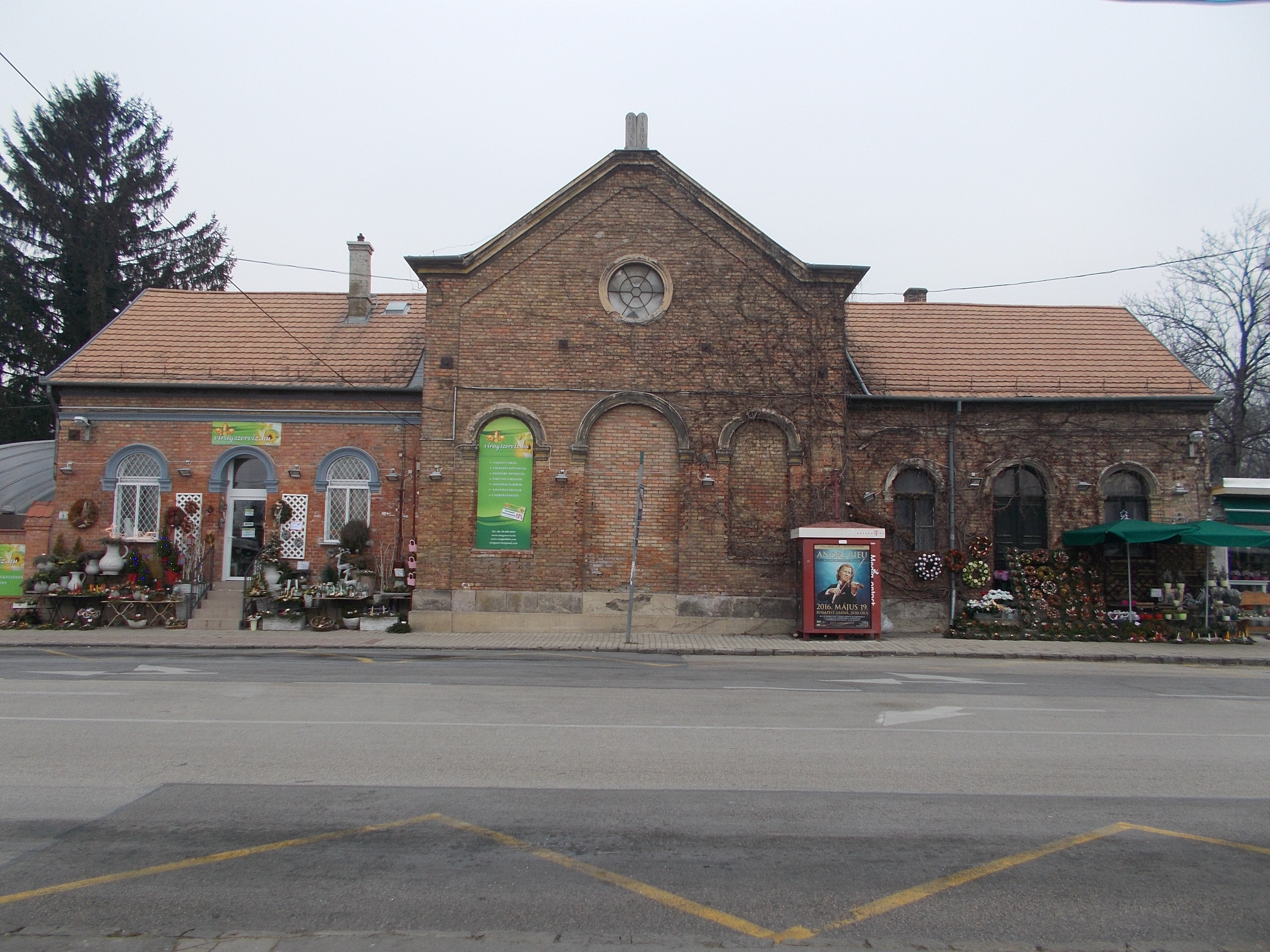
The mortuary of the Farkasrét Israelite cemetery (facade from Márton Áron tér)

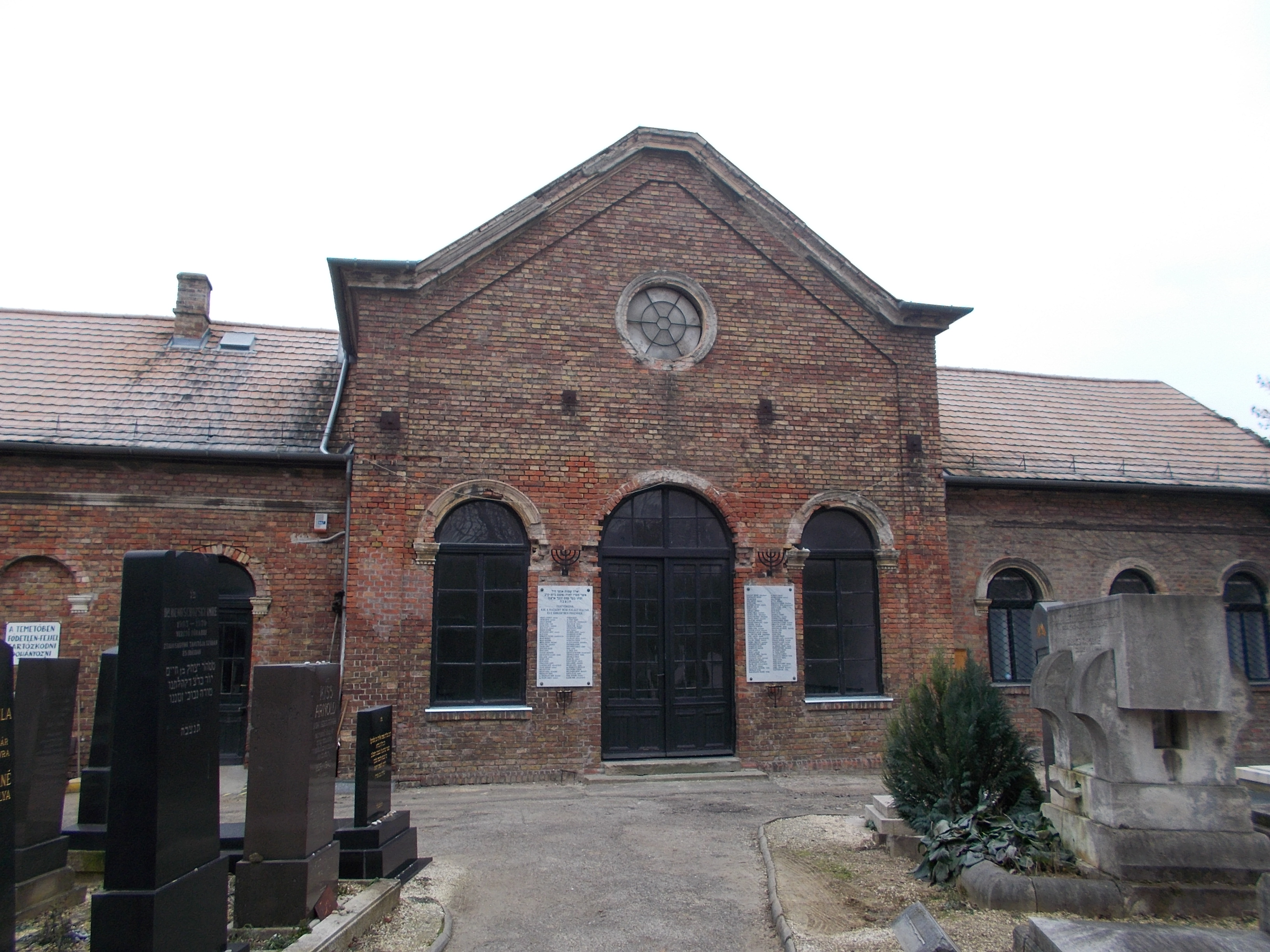
The mortuary of the Israelite cemetery in Farkasrét (cemetery-facing facade)

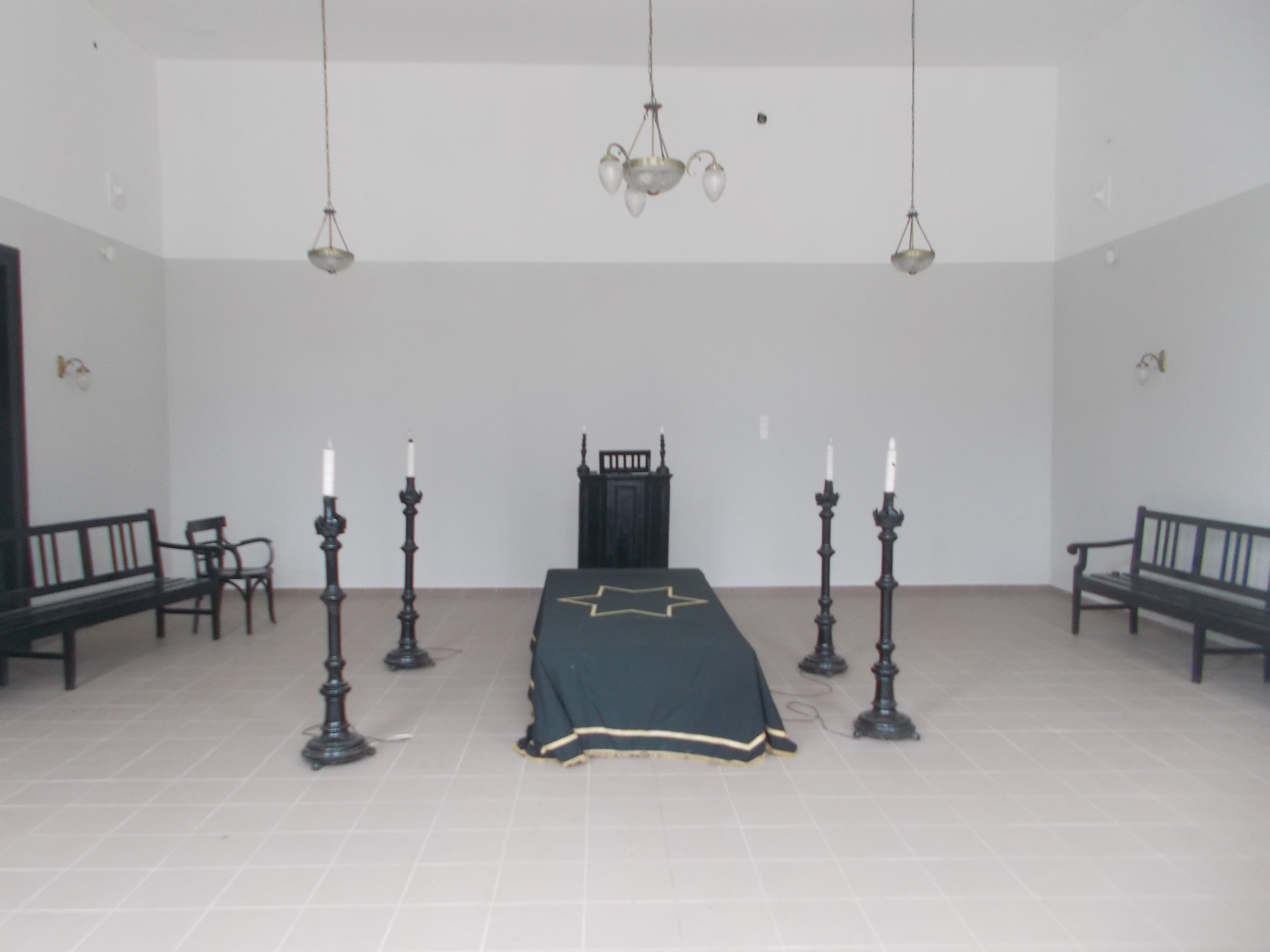
The mortuary of the Israelite cemetery in Farkasrét (interior)

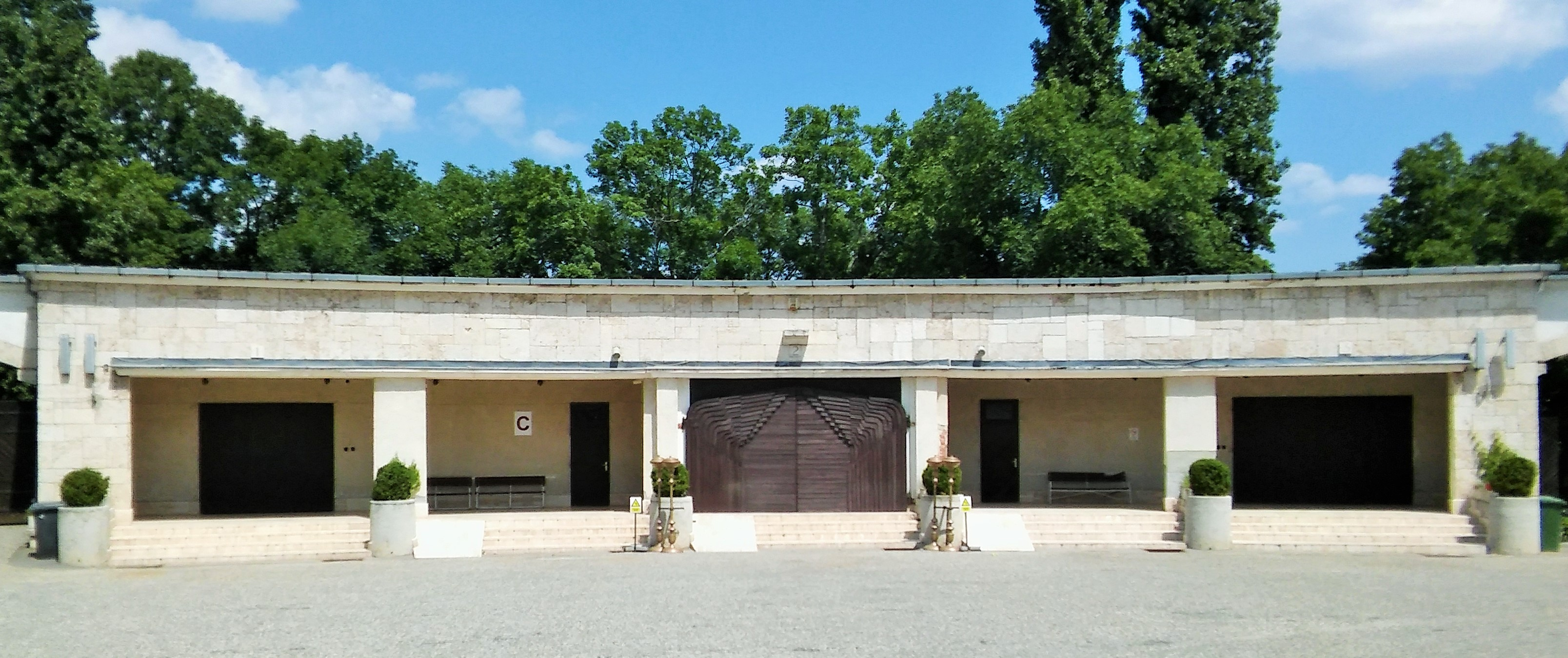
Mortuary of the Farkasrét cemetery

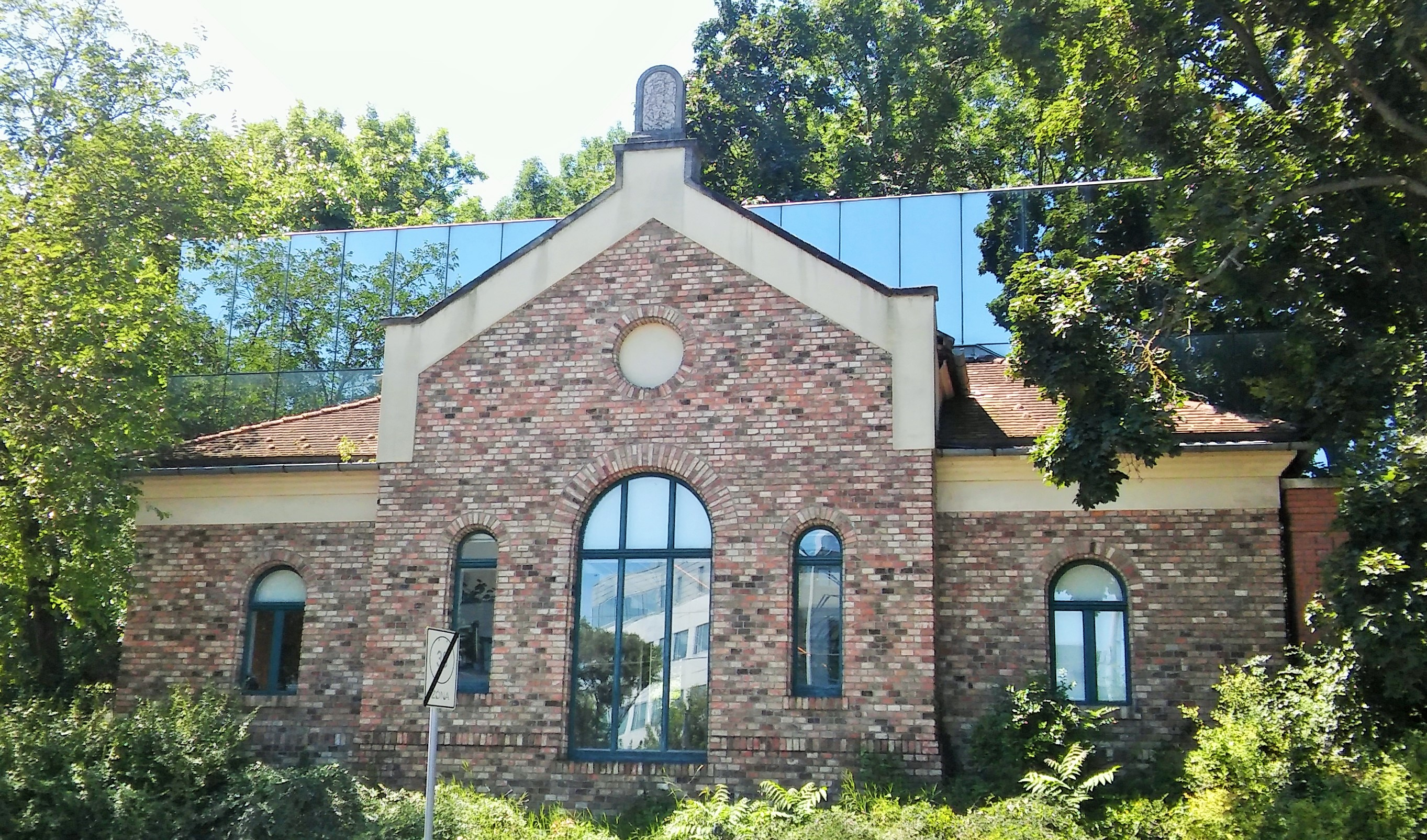
Mortuary of the Táborhegyi Jewish cemetery

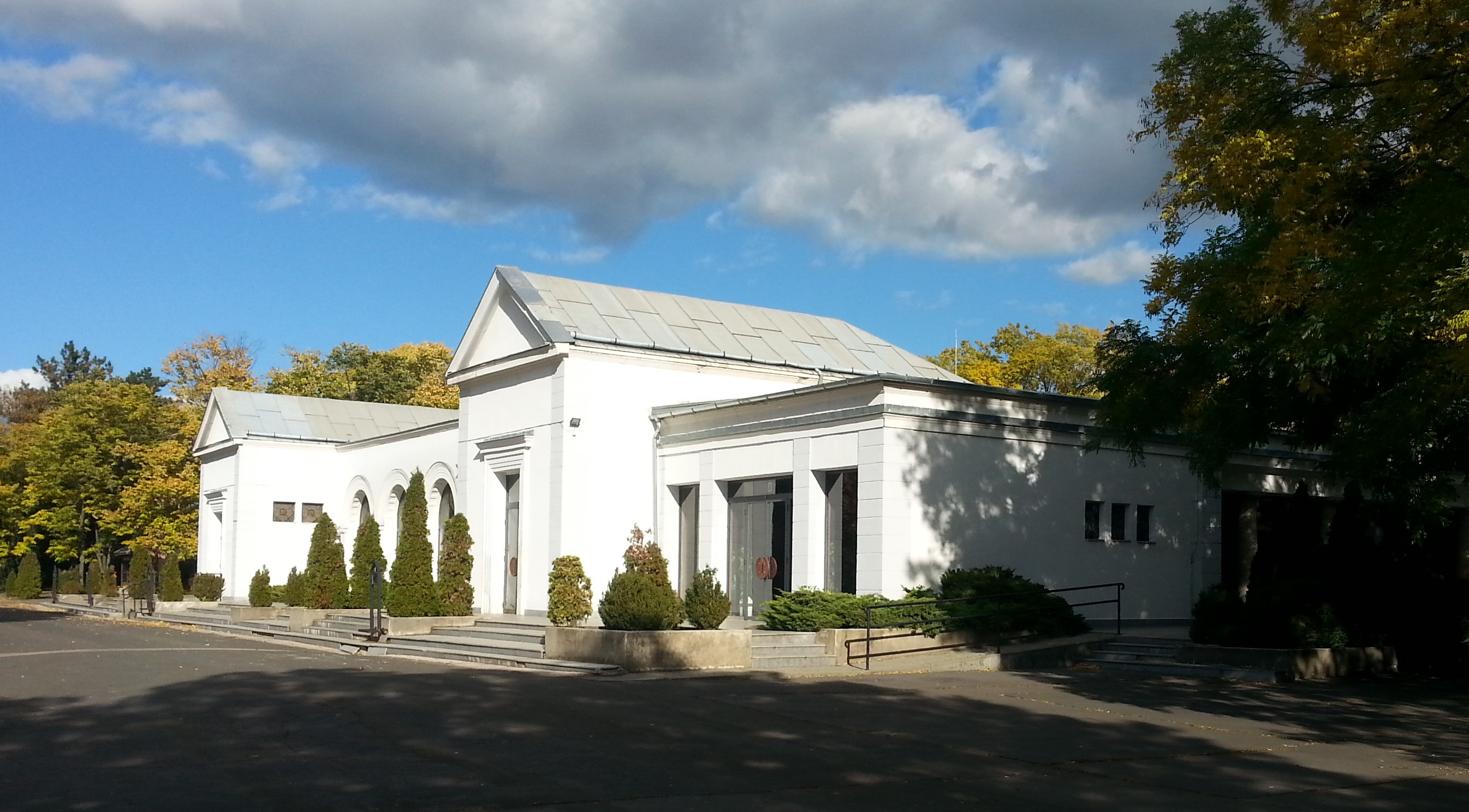
The funeral home and mortuary of the Új public cemetery

== Cemetery chapels ==
A separate cemetery chapel was also built in a Budapest cemetery over time. The earliest of these is the chapel of the Ascension of Christ in the romantic style (1857, Zofahl Lőrinc) located in the Sírkert on Fiumei Street. Much later, the Óbuda Risen Savior cemetery chapel was built in the Óbuda cemetery (1930, Ferenc Adamek). In the Farkasrét cemetery, the St. John of the Cross cemetery chapel was built in 1938 (Virgil Krassói and Ferenc Módos). The building did not stand for long, because it was already destroyed in the Second World War. The remaining bottom is still used for urn graves today. The chapel and mortuary of the Csepel cemetery were demolished in 1970.

In the Fiumei út Sírkert, the Soviet military plot was being tidied up in the early 2010s. During this, a separate small cemetery chapel, the Archangel Michael Chapel, was built with the support of the Russian state in memory of the Soviet soldiers.

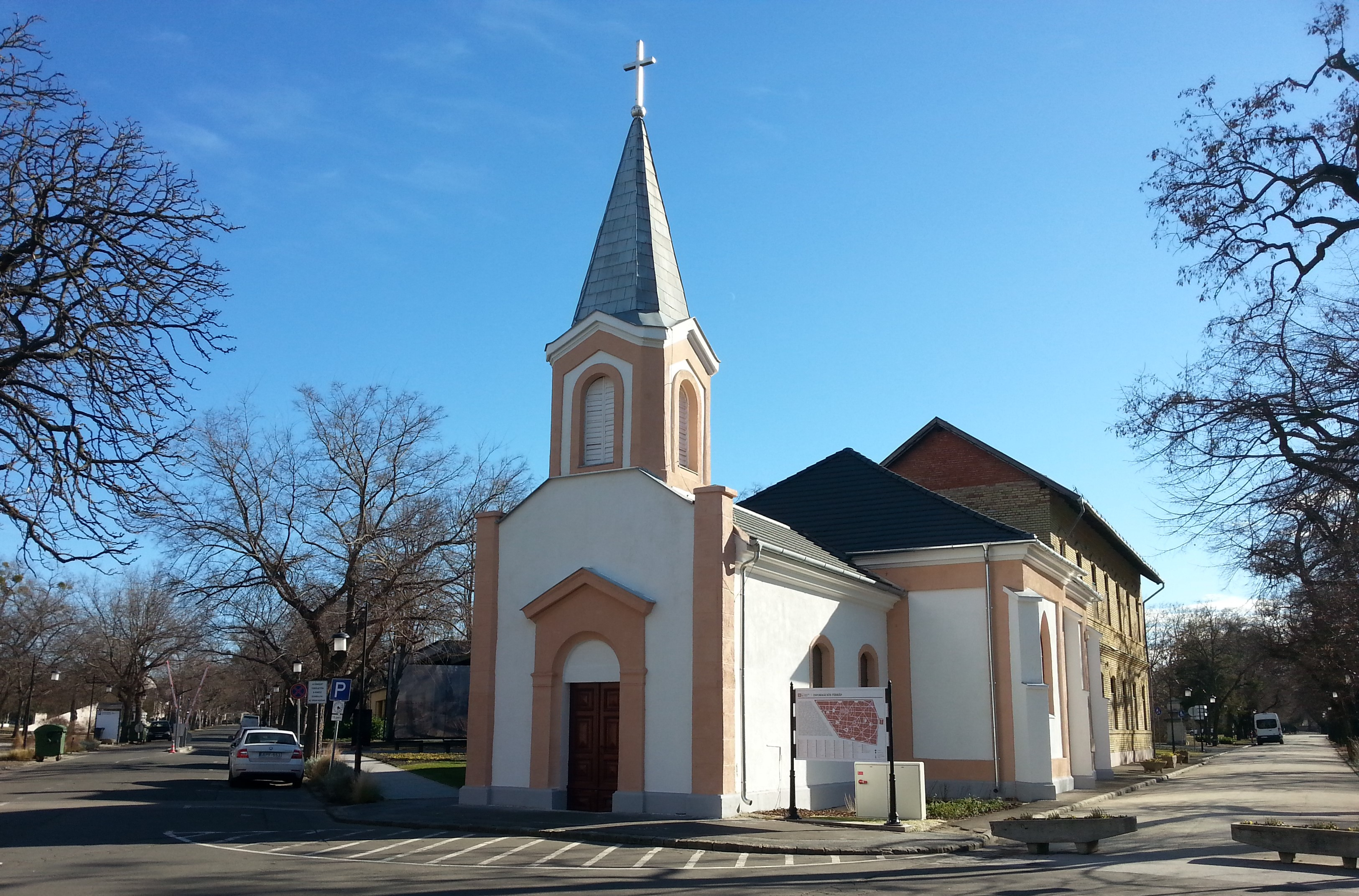
Chapel of the Ascension of Christ

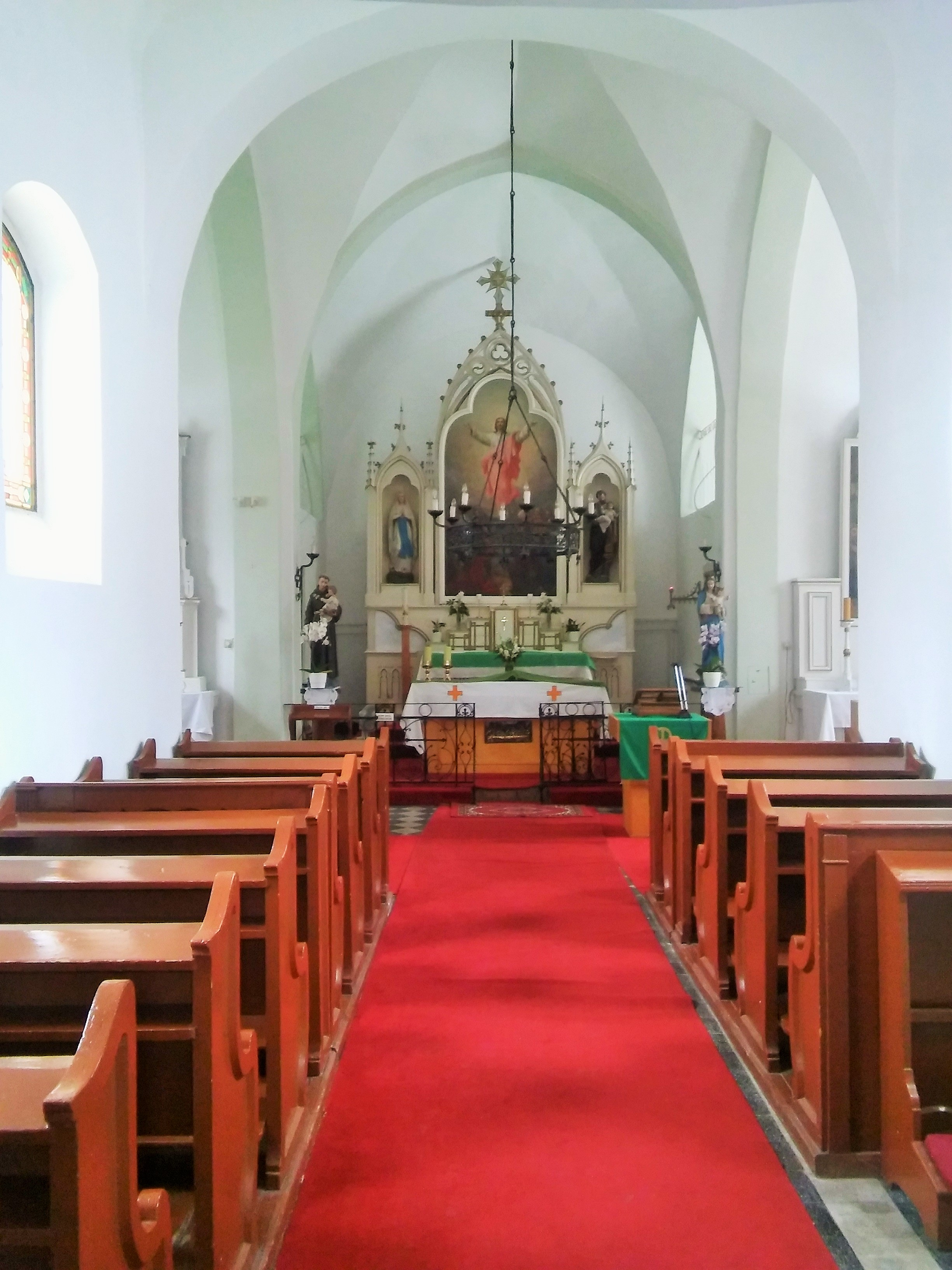
Chapel of the Ascension of Christ (interior)

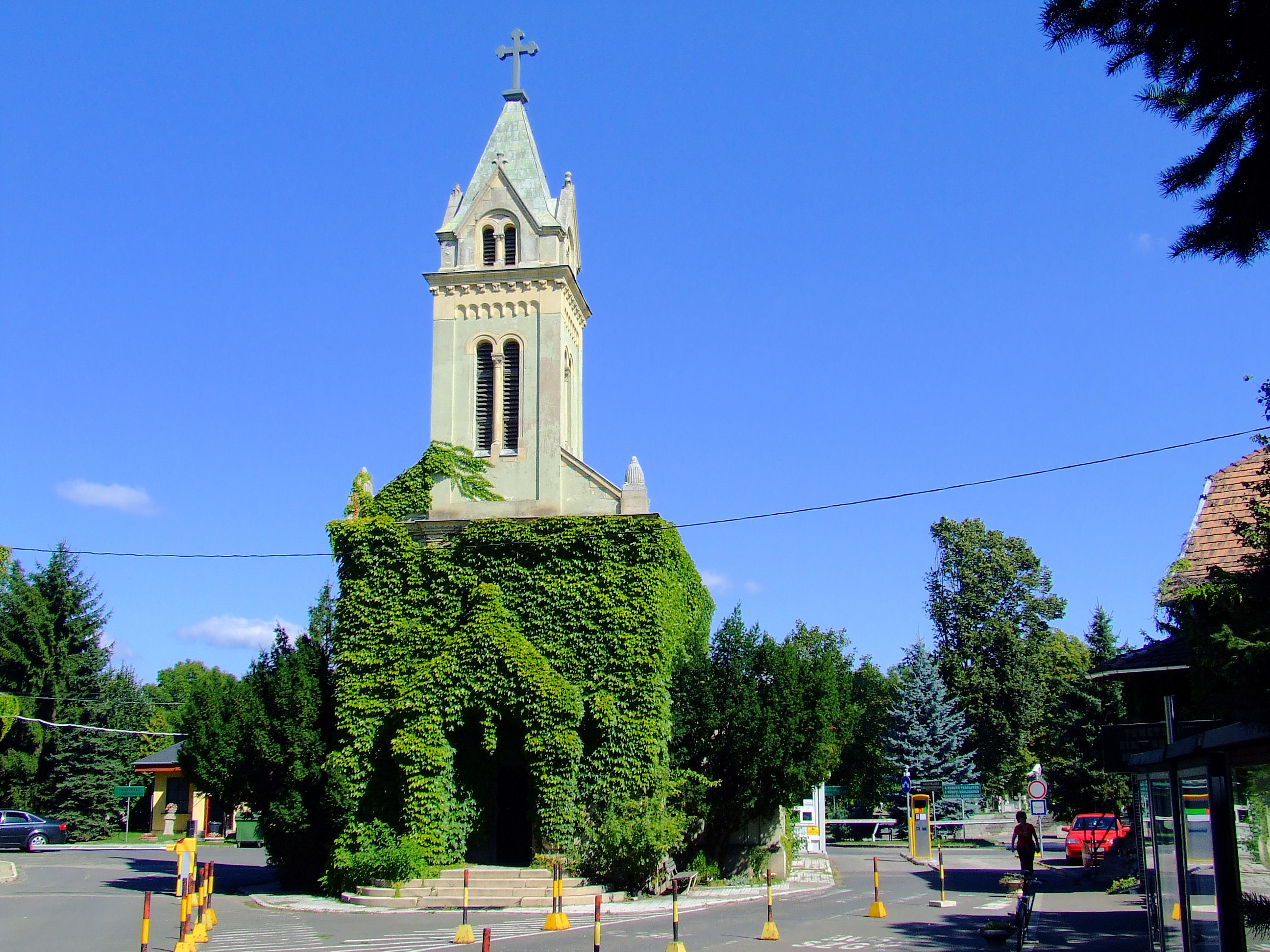
Óbuda Risen Savior cemetery chapel

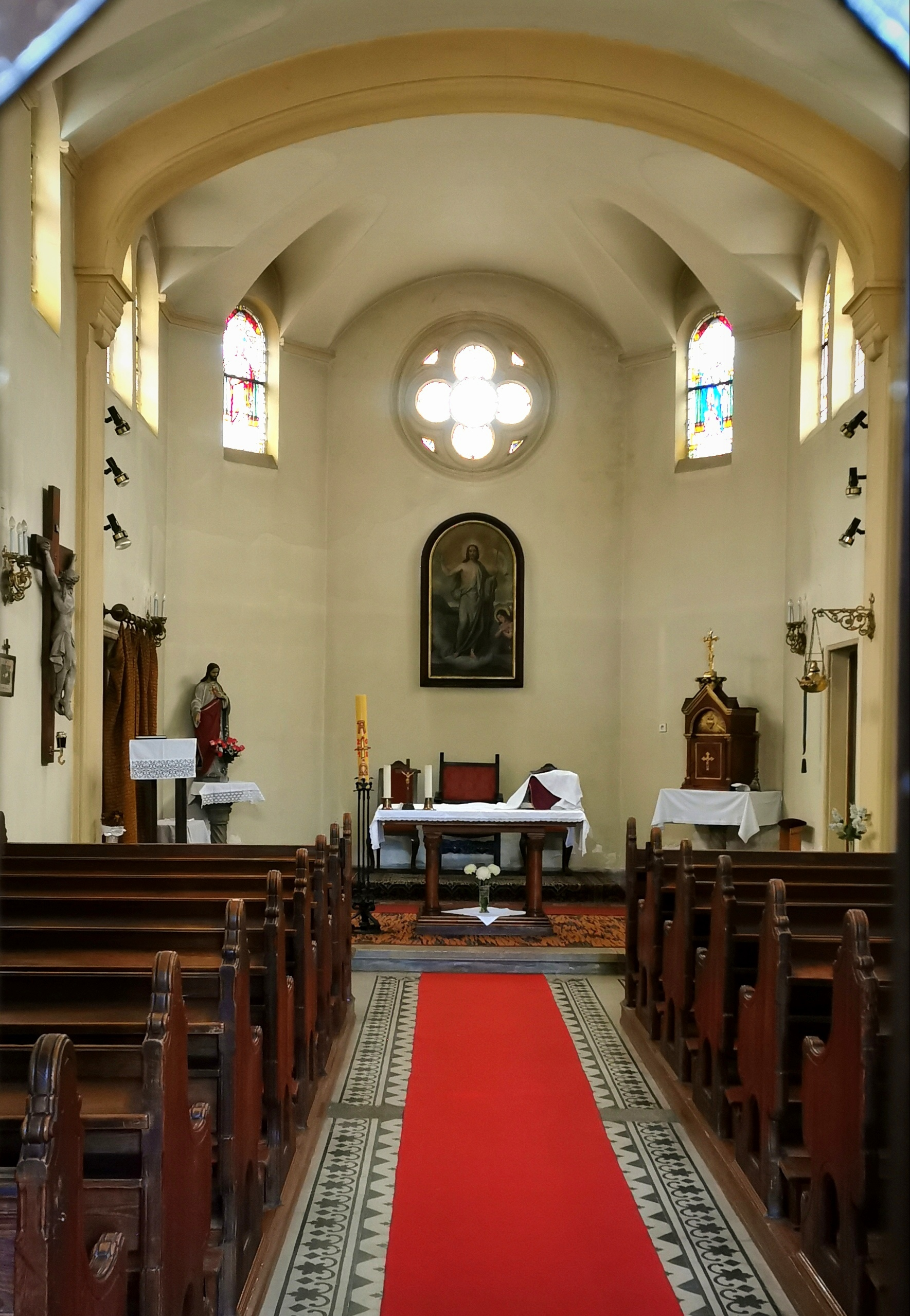
Óbuda Risen Savior cemetery chapel (interior)

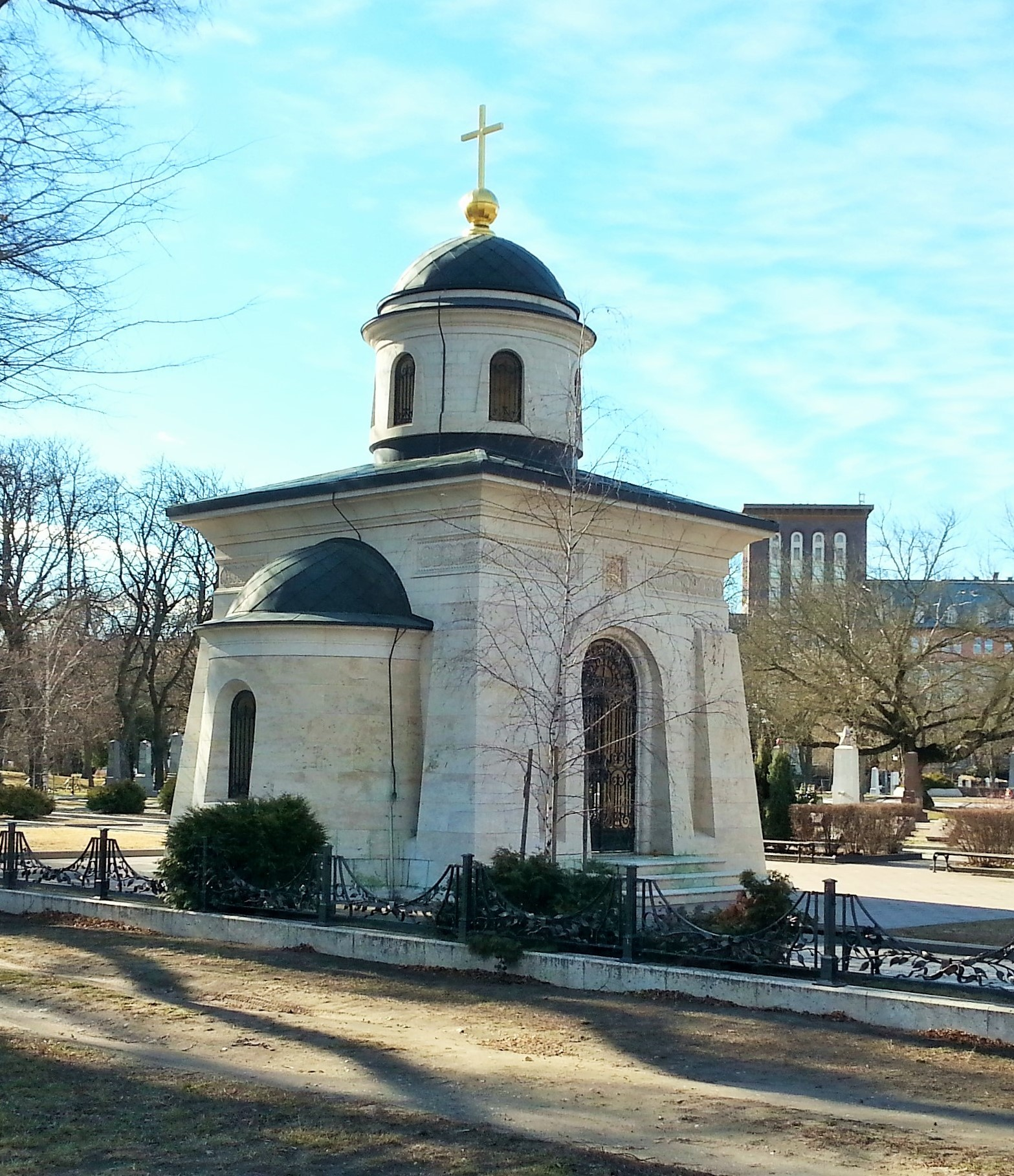
Chapel of the Archangel Michael

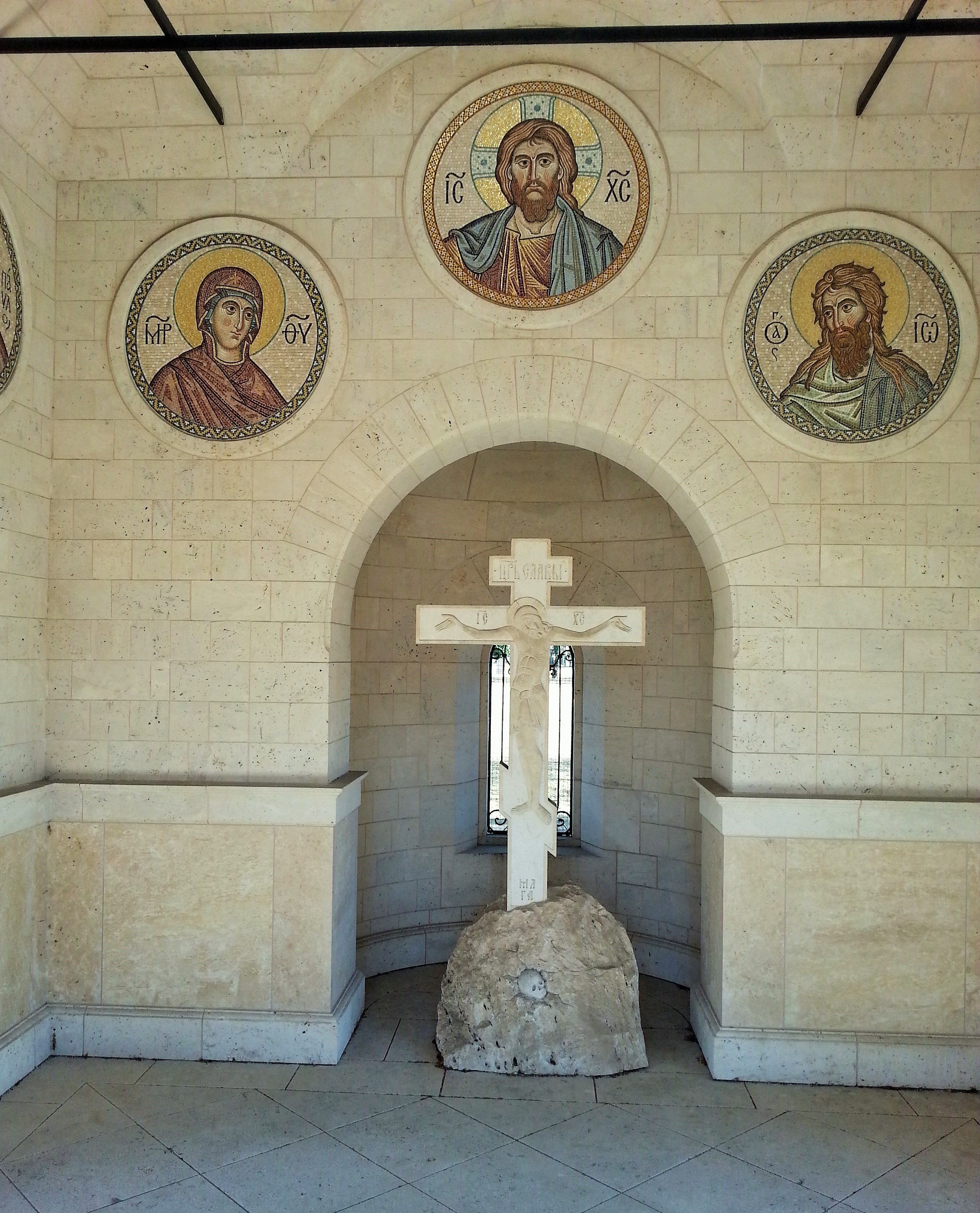
Chapel of the Archangel Michael (interior)

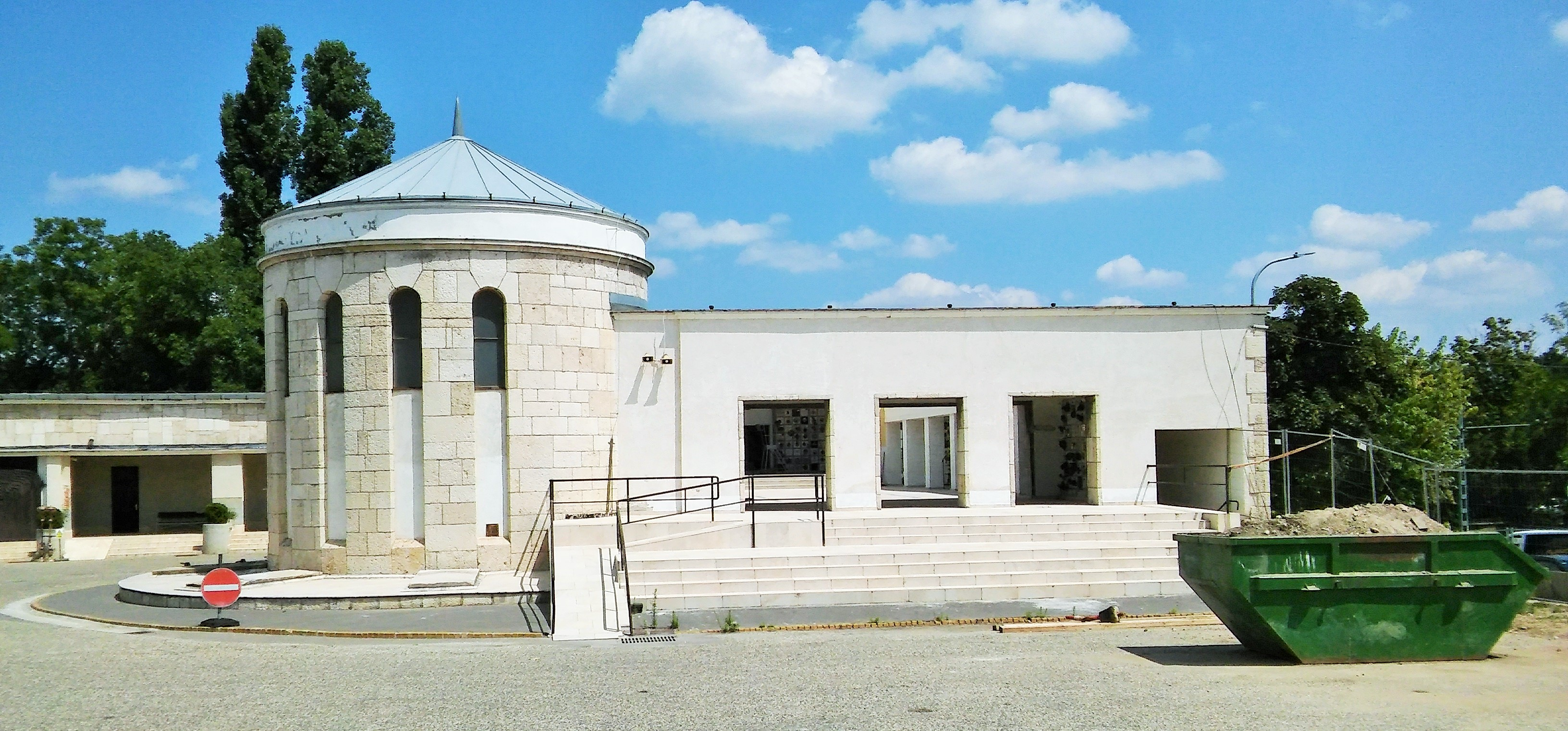
remains of the St. John of the Cross cemetery chapel

== Monuments in cemeteries ==
There are several small and large (usually war) monuments in Budapest cemeteries. These also include symbolic graves (e.g. Fiumeit úti Cemetery, Trianon memorial tomb). Some of these are:

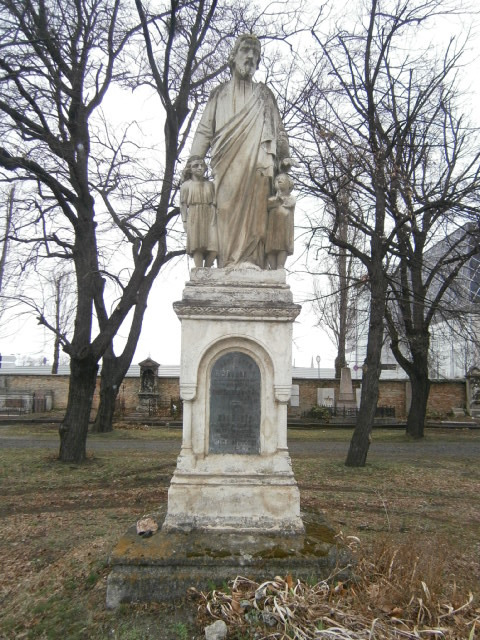
Monument-like statue of Christ, Fiumei út Cemetery

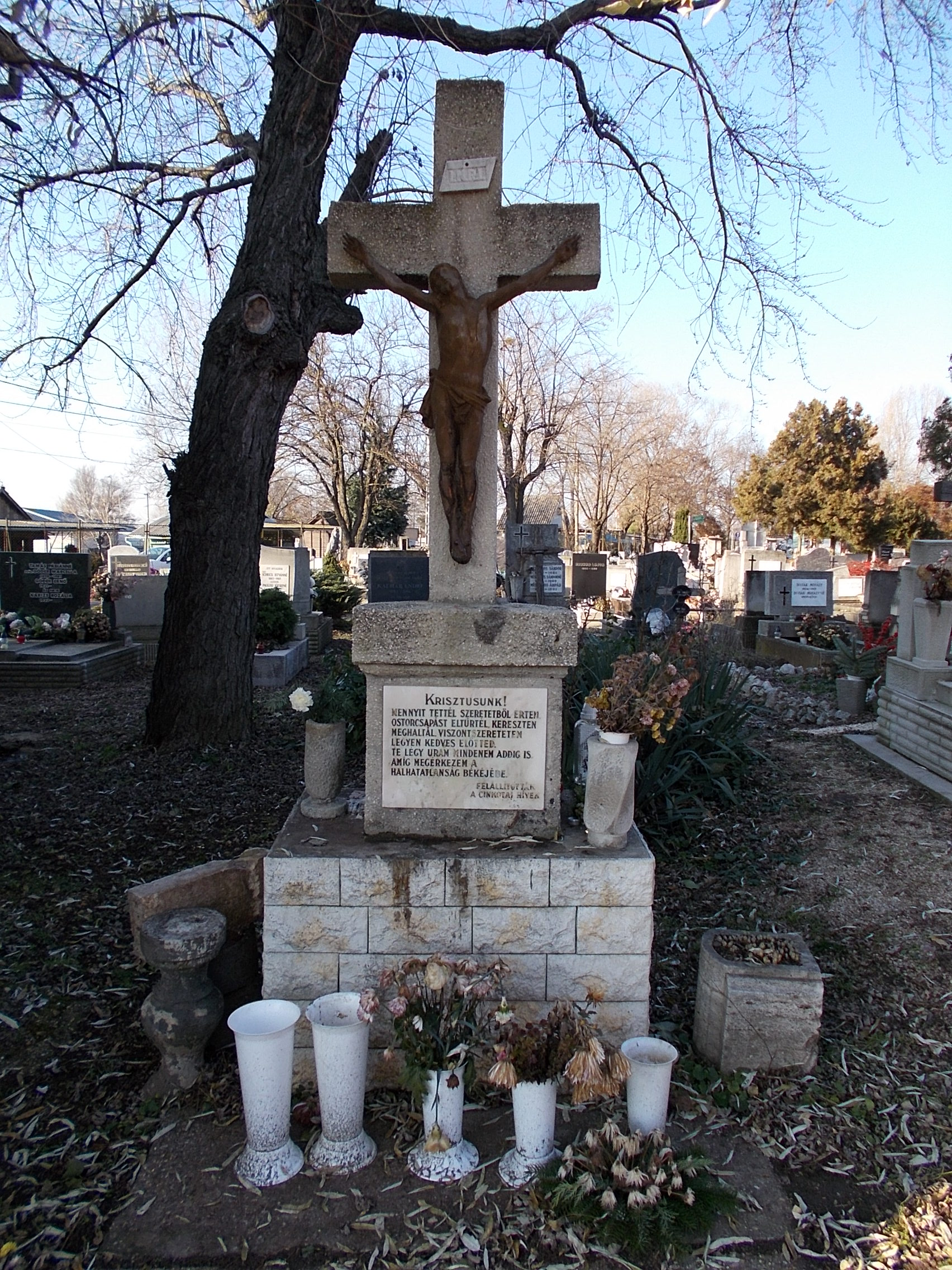
Memorial cross, Cinkotai public cemetery

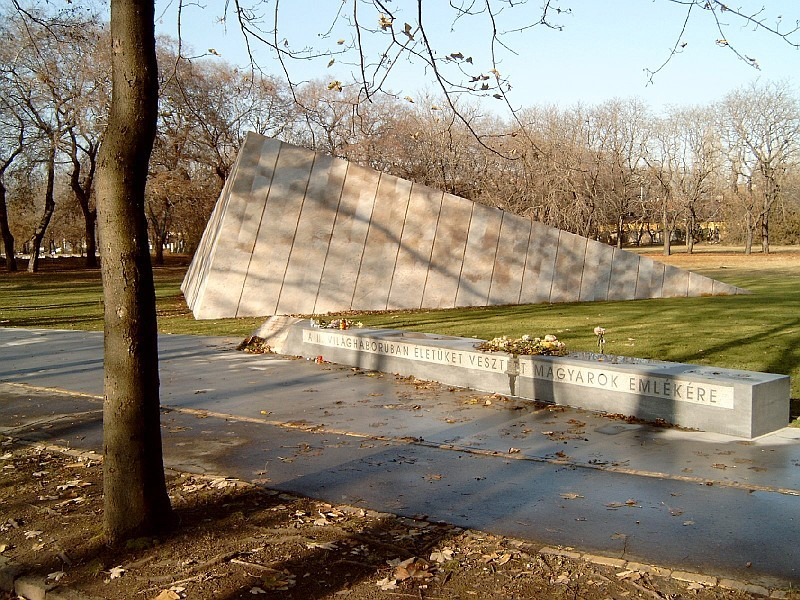
Hungarian Second World War Heroes' Memorial, Fiumei Street Cemetery

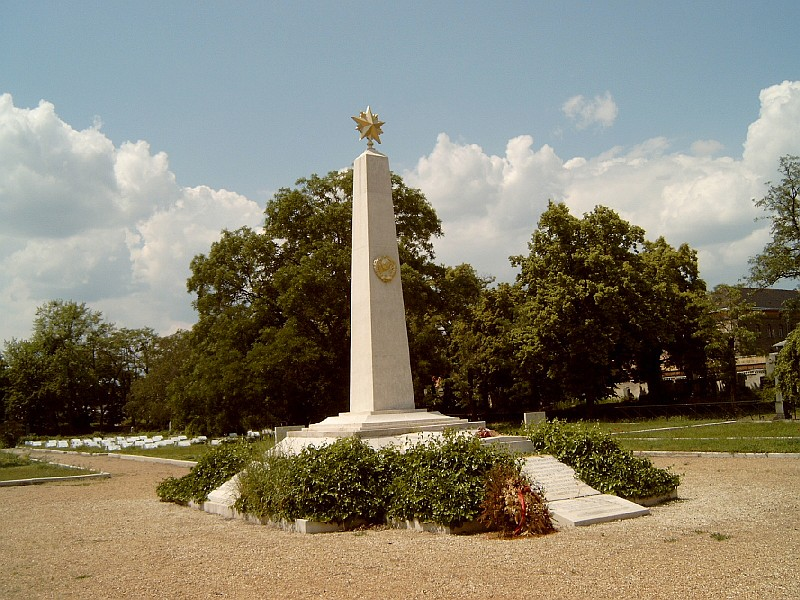
Soviet Second World War Heroes' Monument, Fiumei út Cemetery

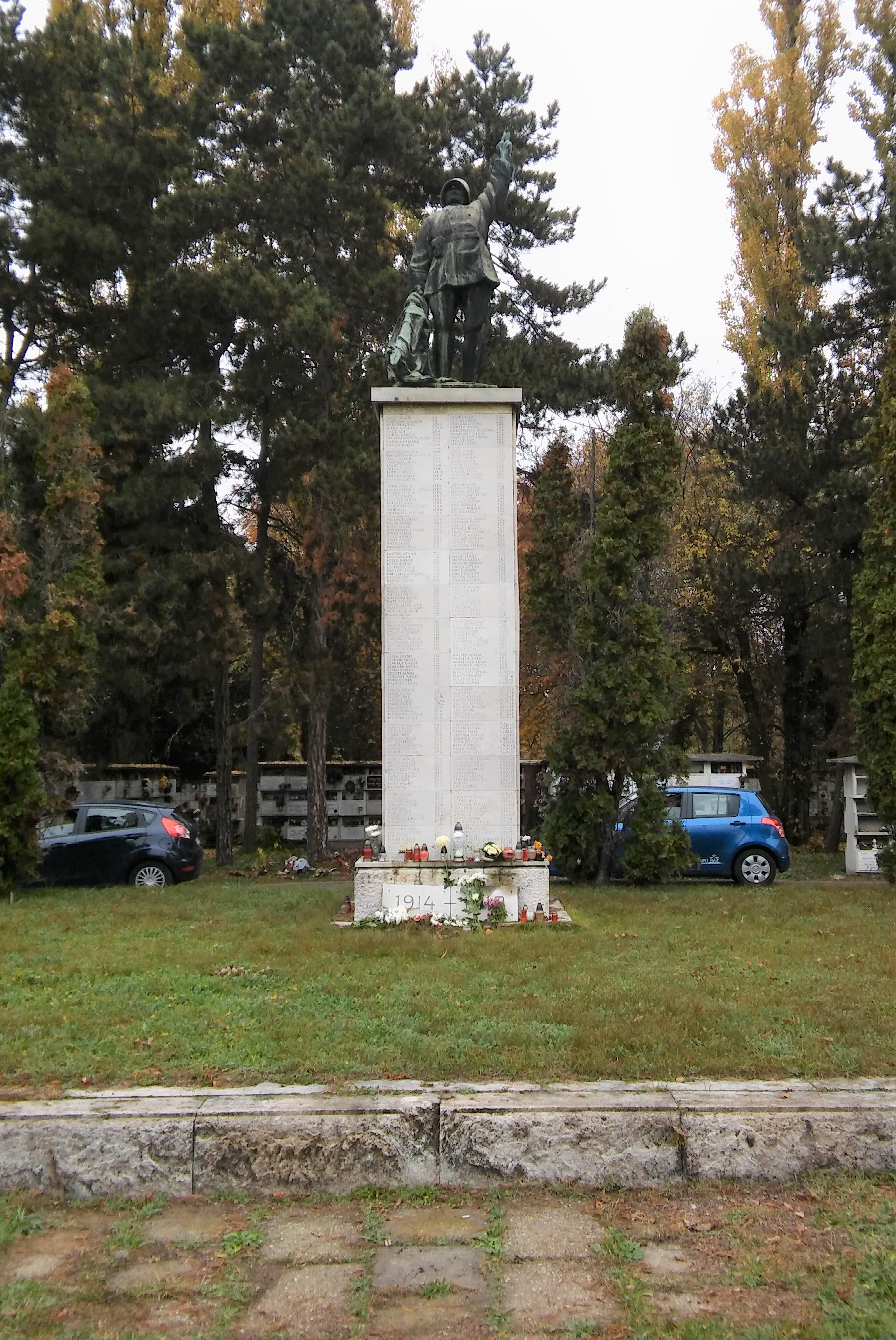
Hungarian First World War Heroes' Memorial, Új public cemetery

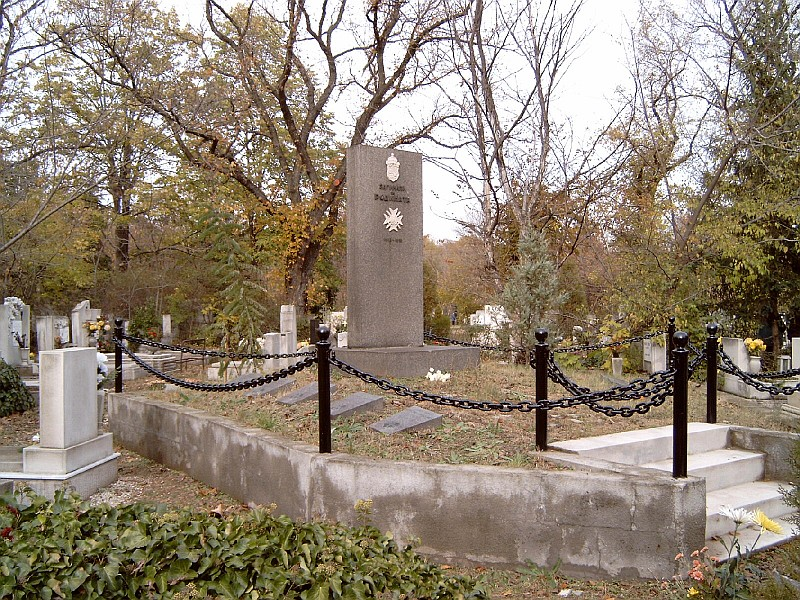
Bulgarian First World War Heroes' Memorial, New Public Cemetery

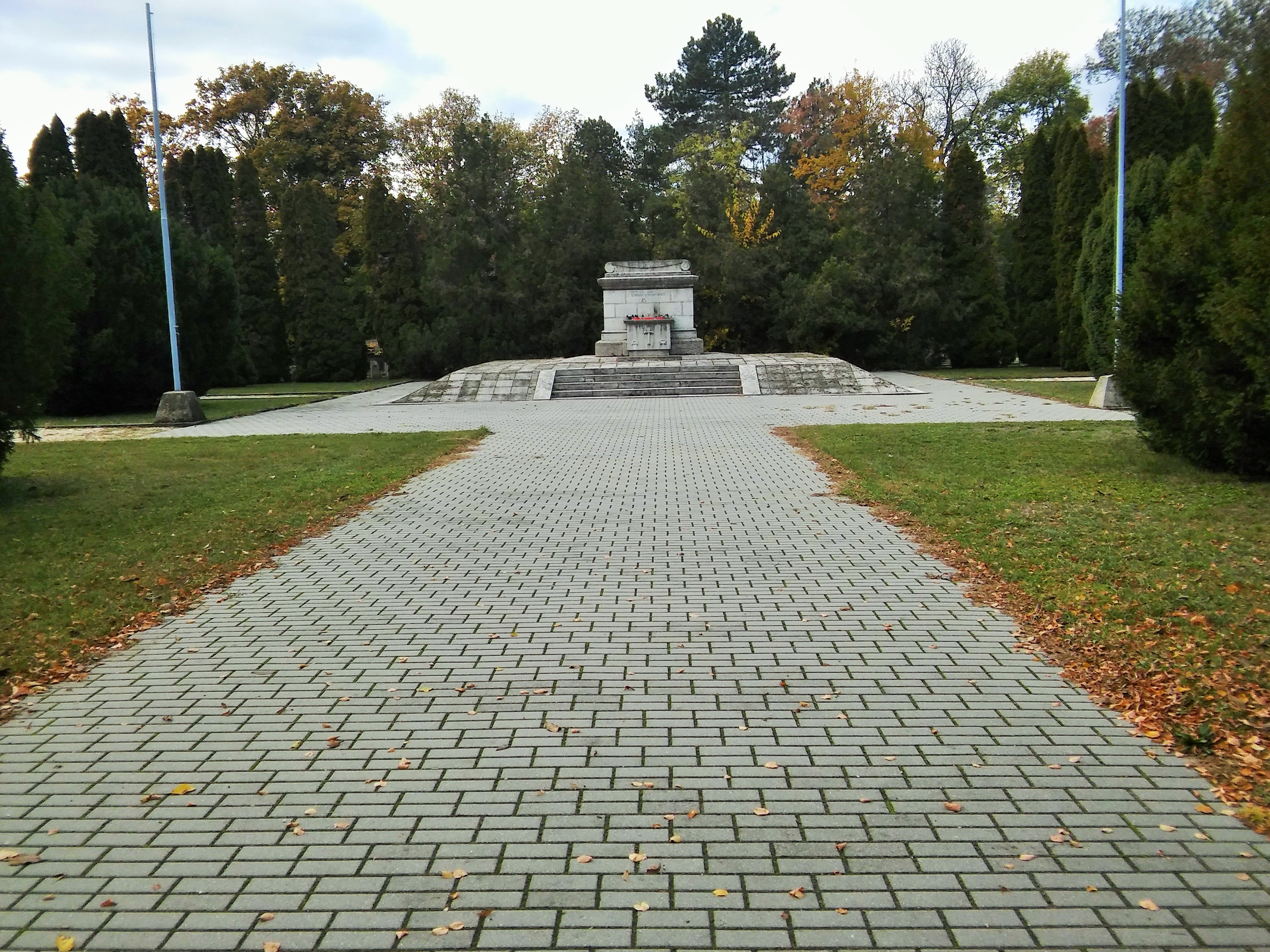
Romanian First World War Heroes' Memorial, New Public Cemetery

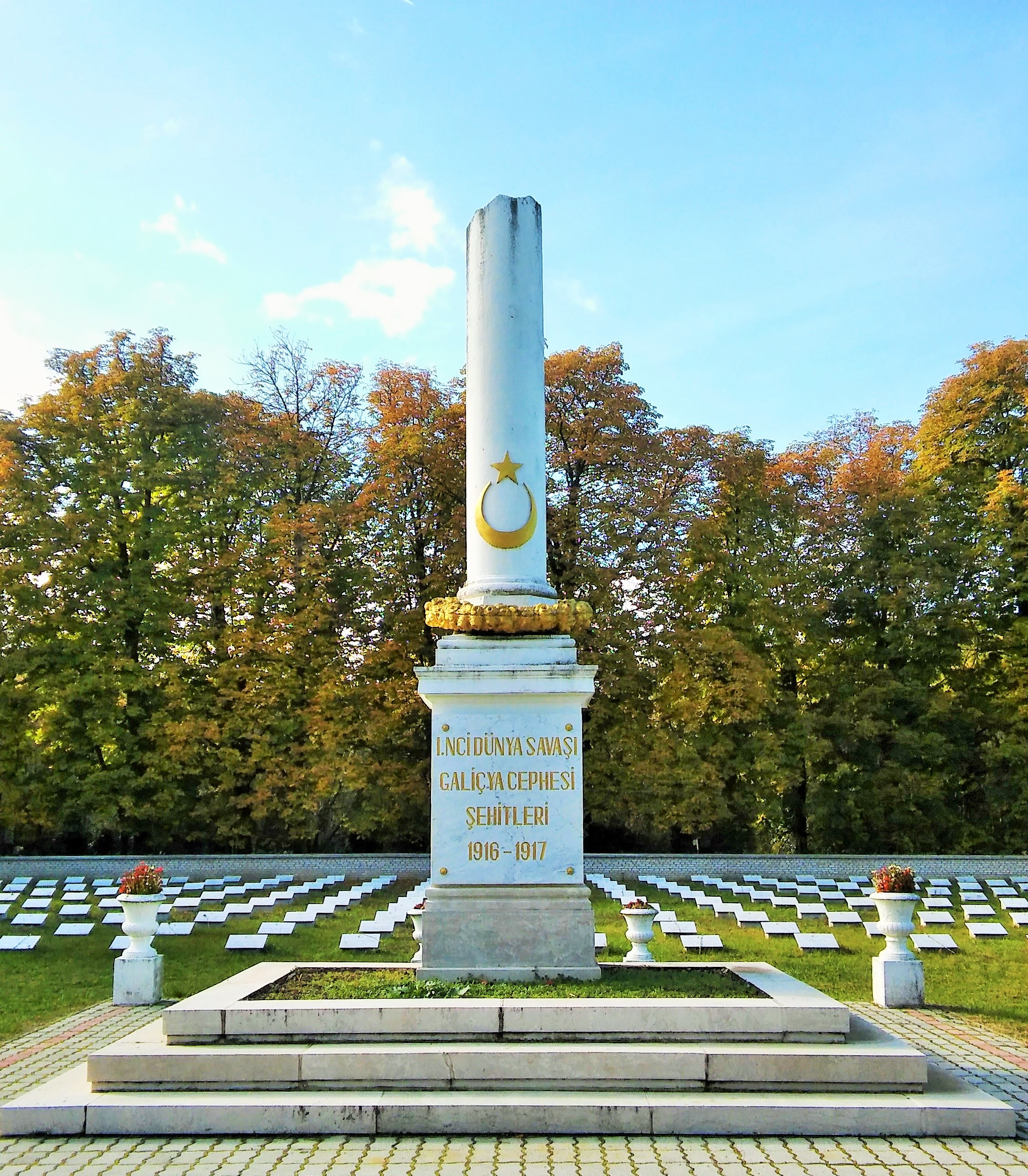
Turkish First World War Heroes' Memorial, New Public Cemetery

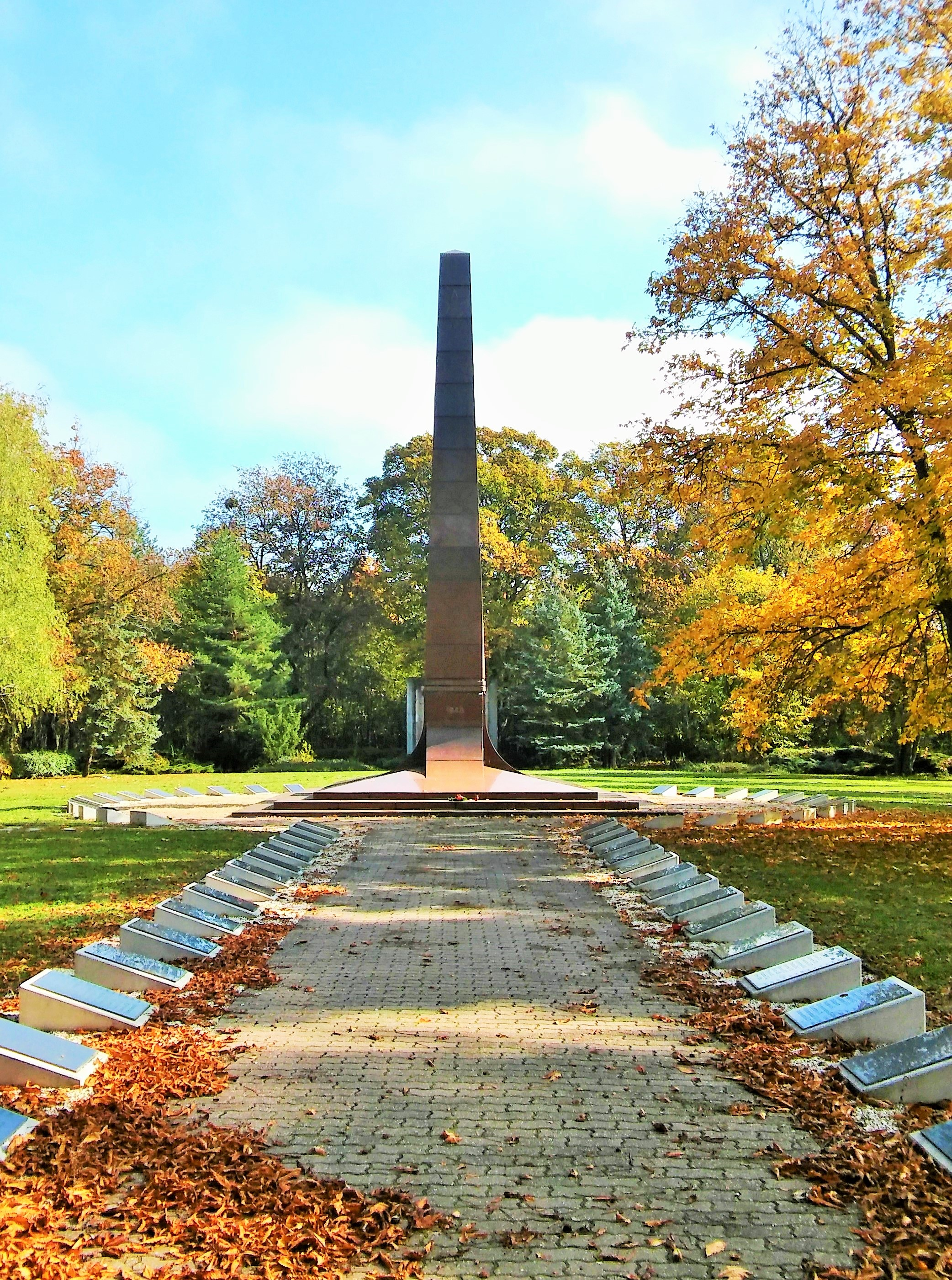
Soviet Second World War Heroes' Memorial, New Public Cemetery

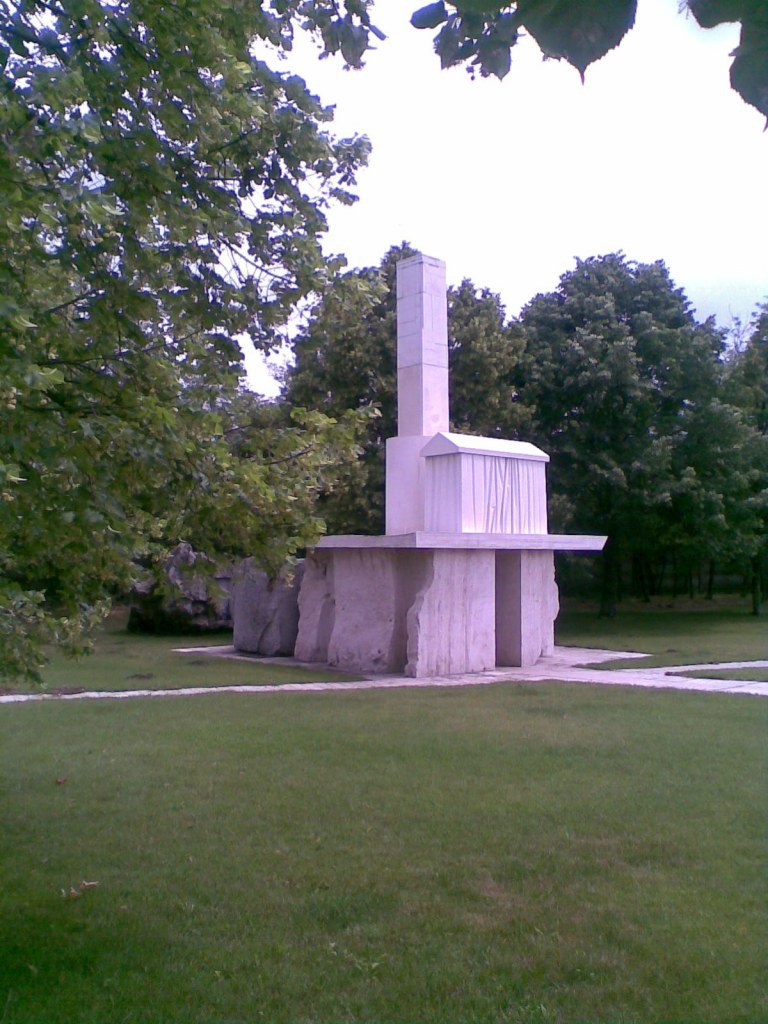
Monument to the Martyrs of the 1956 Revolution, New Public Cemetery

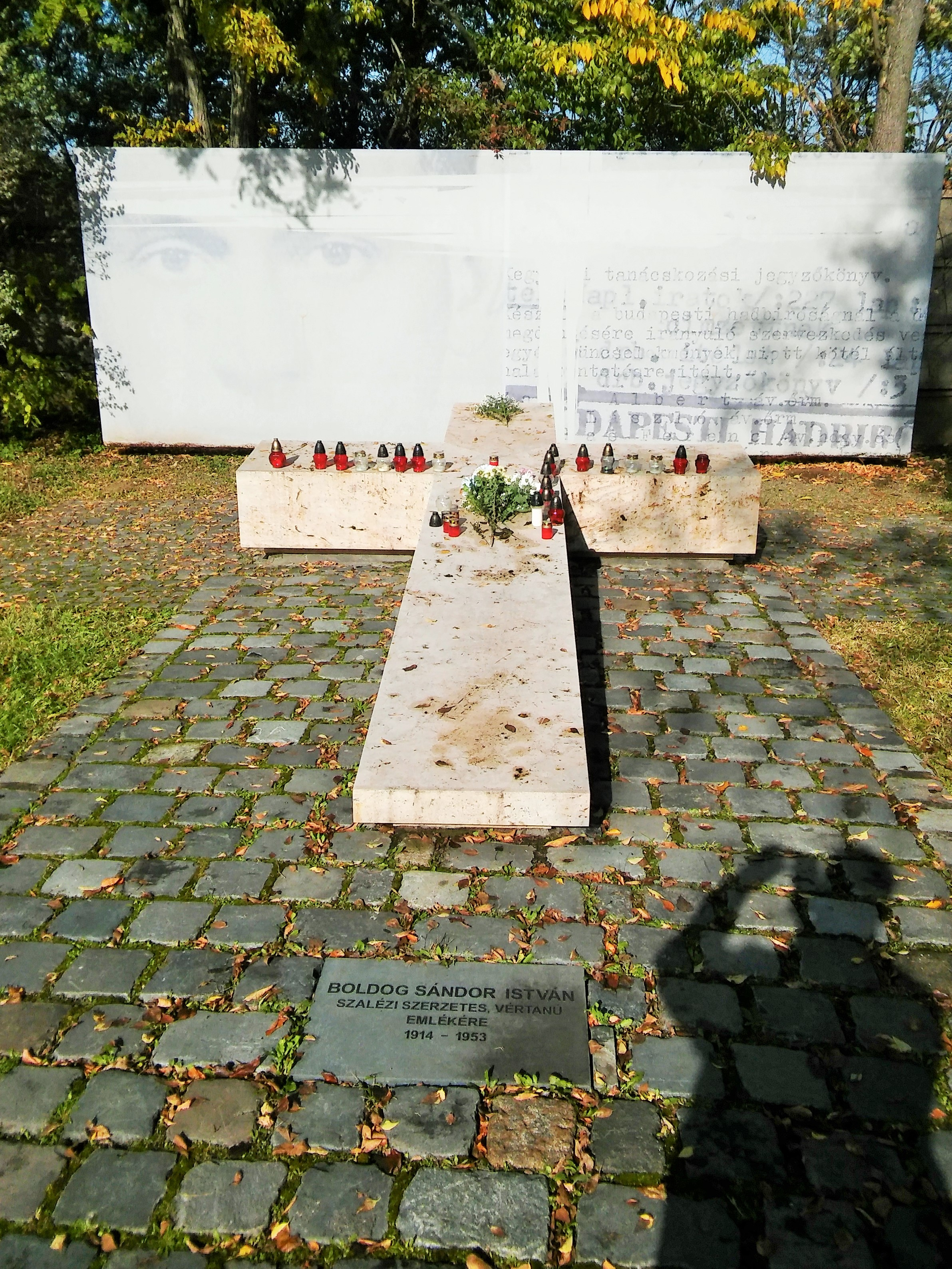
István Boldog Sándor memorial site, New public cemetery

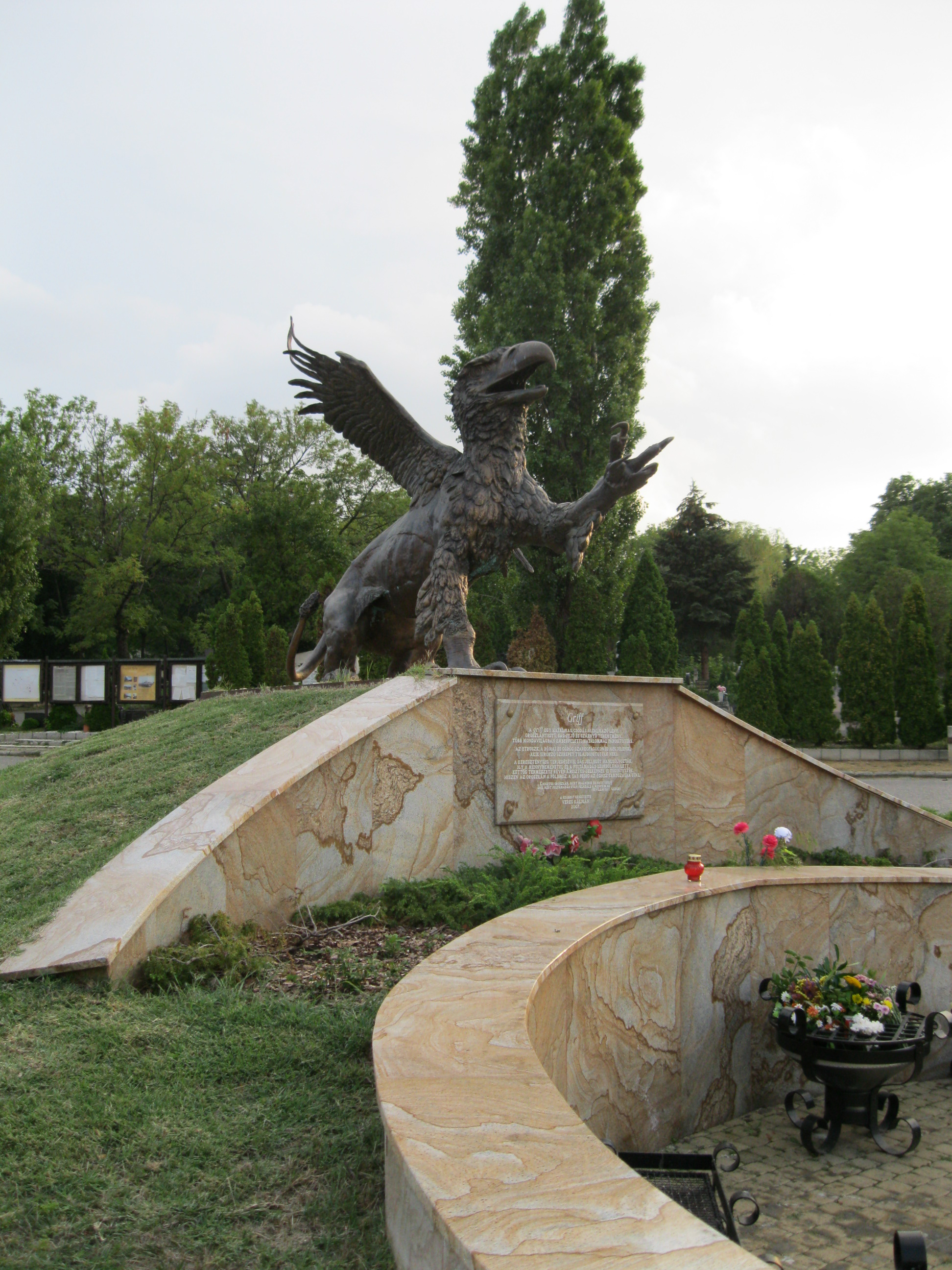
Griffin statue (resurrection monument), Farkasrét cemeter

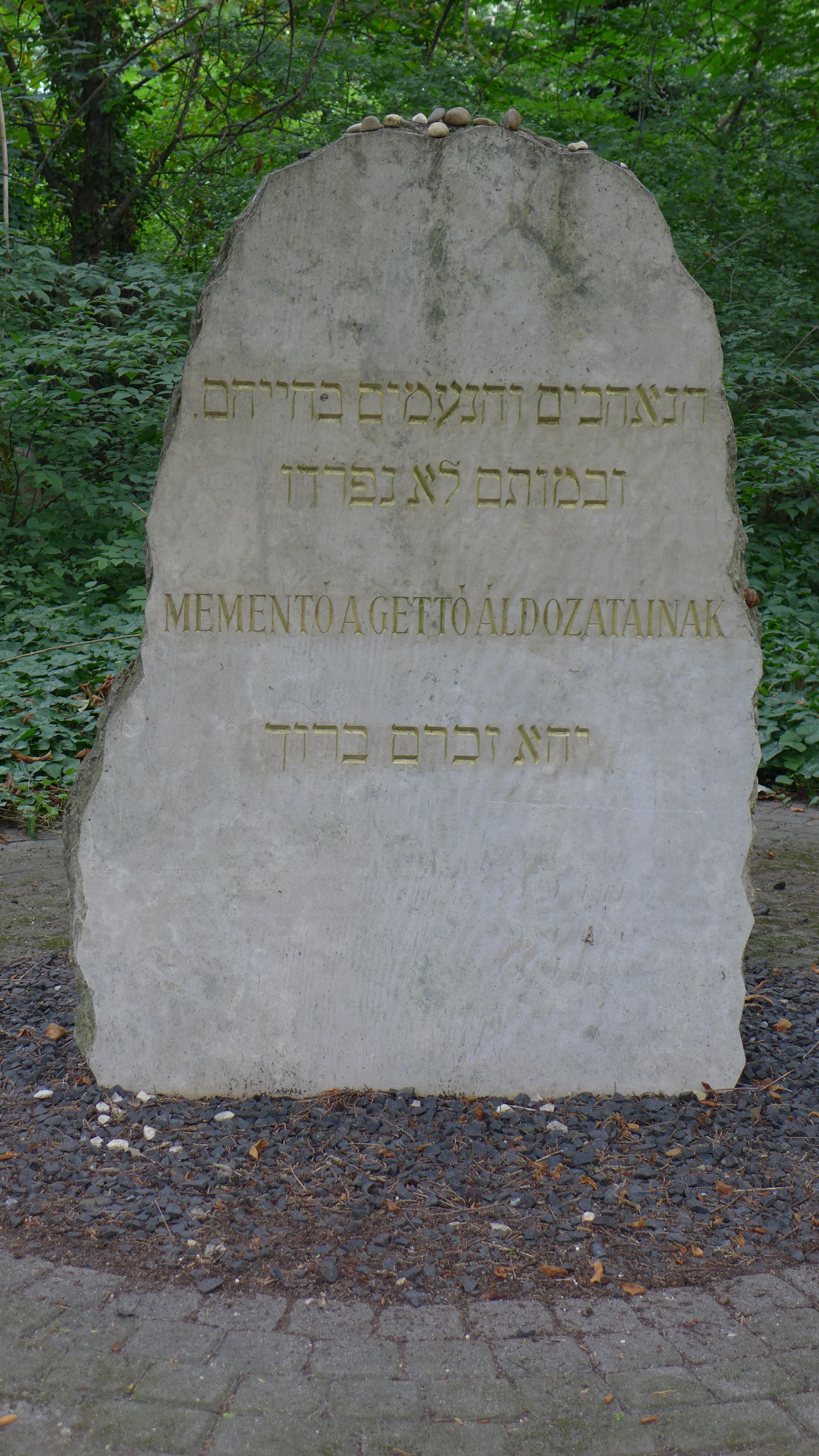
Memorial to the victims of the Budapest ghetto, Salgótarjáni street Jewish cemetery

== Crematoriums ==
In 1903 and then in 1915, the first two tenders for the construction of a Budapest crematorium were announced. Many monumental, historicizing and Art Nouveau plans were received from renowned architects, but the building was not constructed at that time.

Hungary's first crematorium was not built in Budapest, but in Debrecen in 1931–1932, and it was not put into operation until 1951.

Budapest's first crematorium was built in a new public cemetery between 1964 and 1967, it was built in a modern style and opened in 1968. Its designer was János Pomsár. The gate reliefs of the facility were made by Zoltán Bohus. The facility was in operation for 39 years, until 2007. During its existence, the facility cremated nearly 2 million people.

Smaller, non-state-owned incinerators have been built in and around the capital since the 1990s. One of these, the Csömör Crematorium, which is not located in Budapest, but is adjacent to it, was taken over by the Budapest Burial Institute after the crematorium of the New Public Cemetery was closed. The other such facility is the Nagytétényi Crematorium.

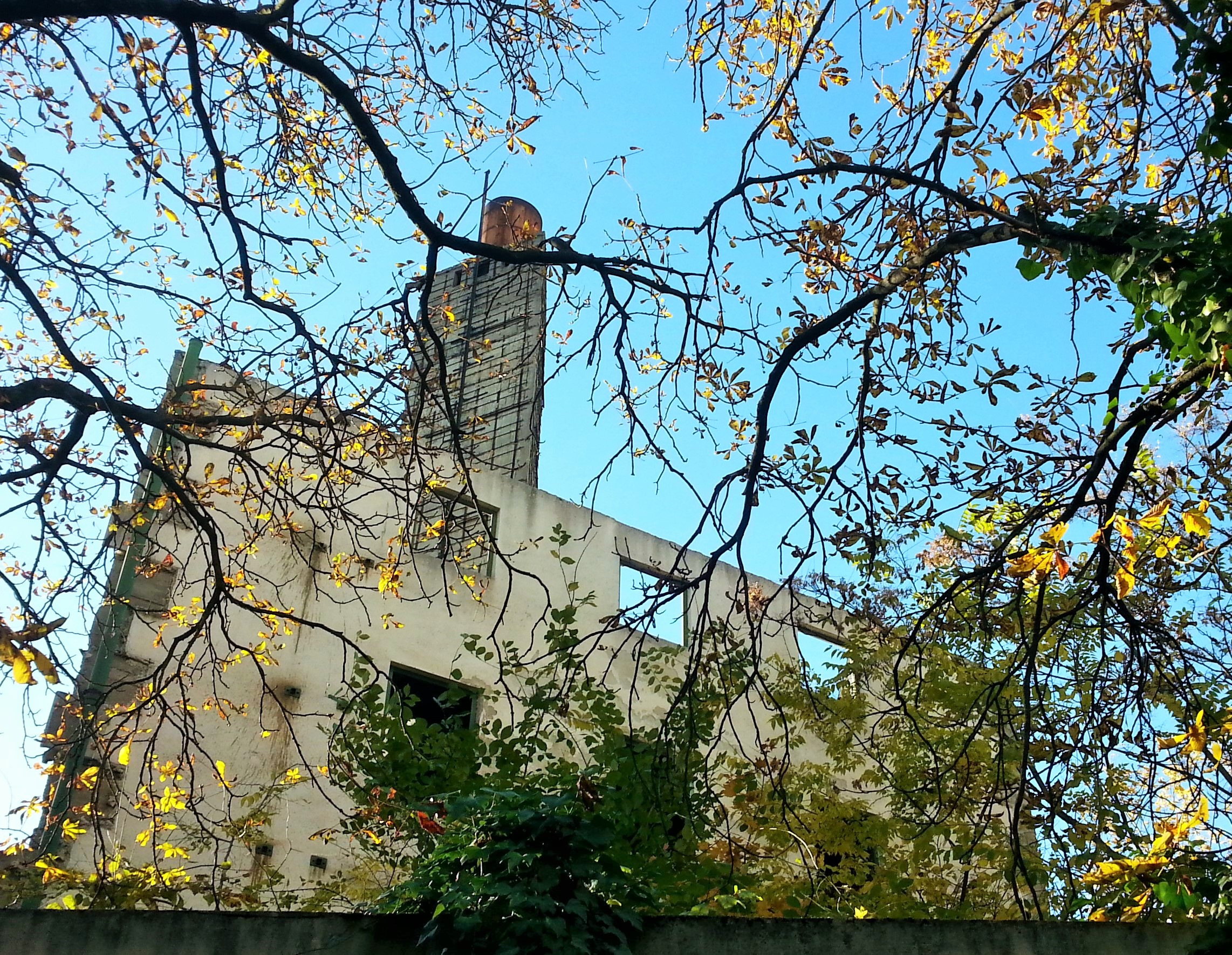
The crematorium of the New Public Cemetery

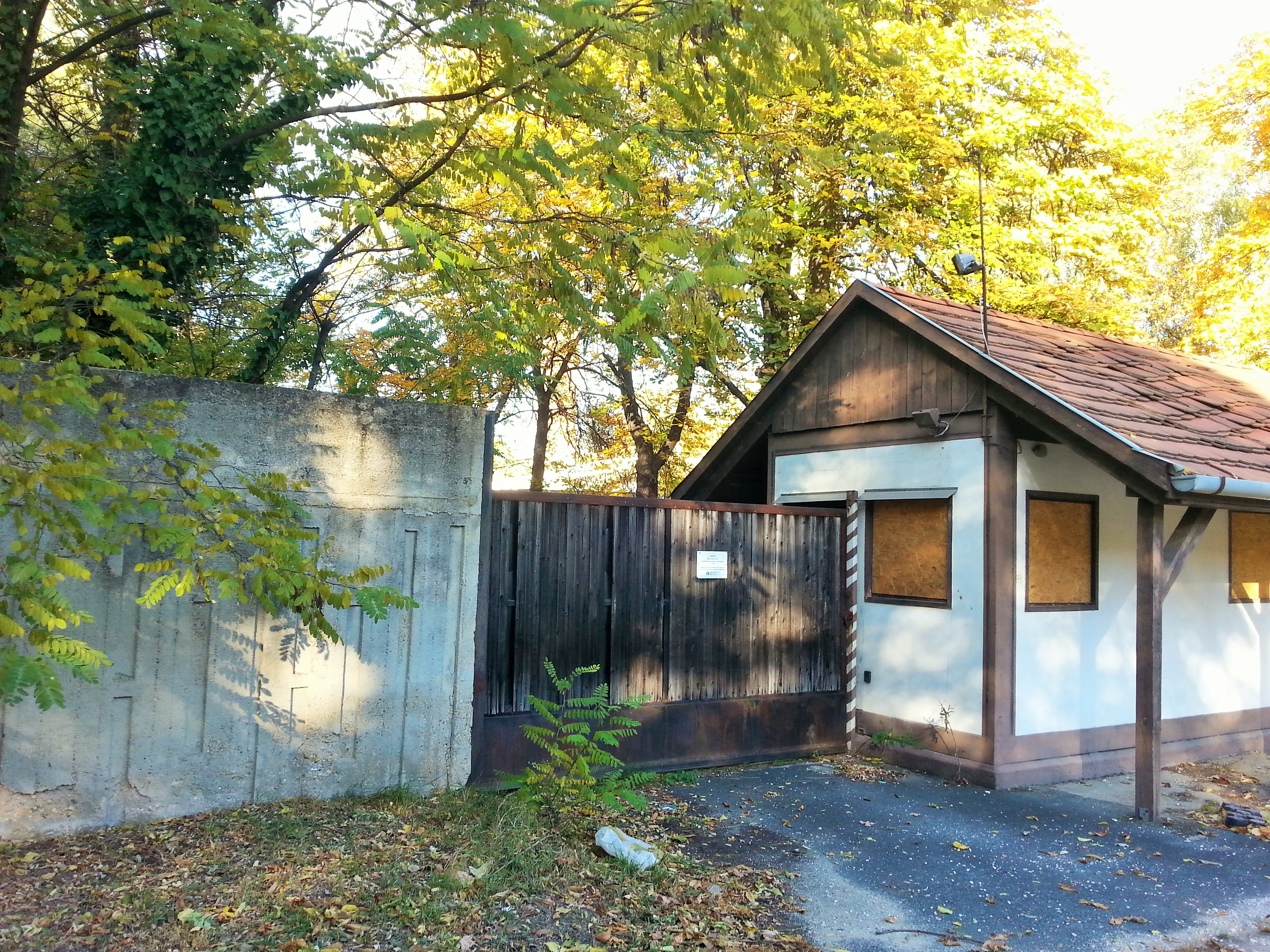
The entrance to the crematorium of the New Public Cemetery

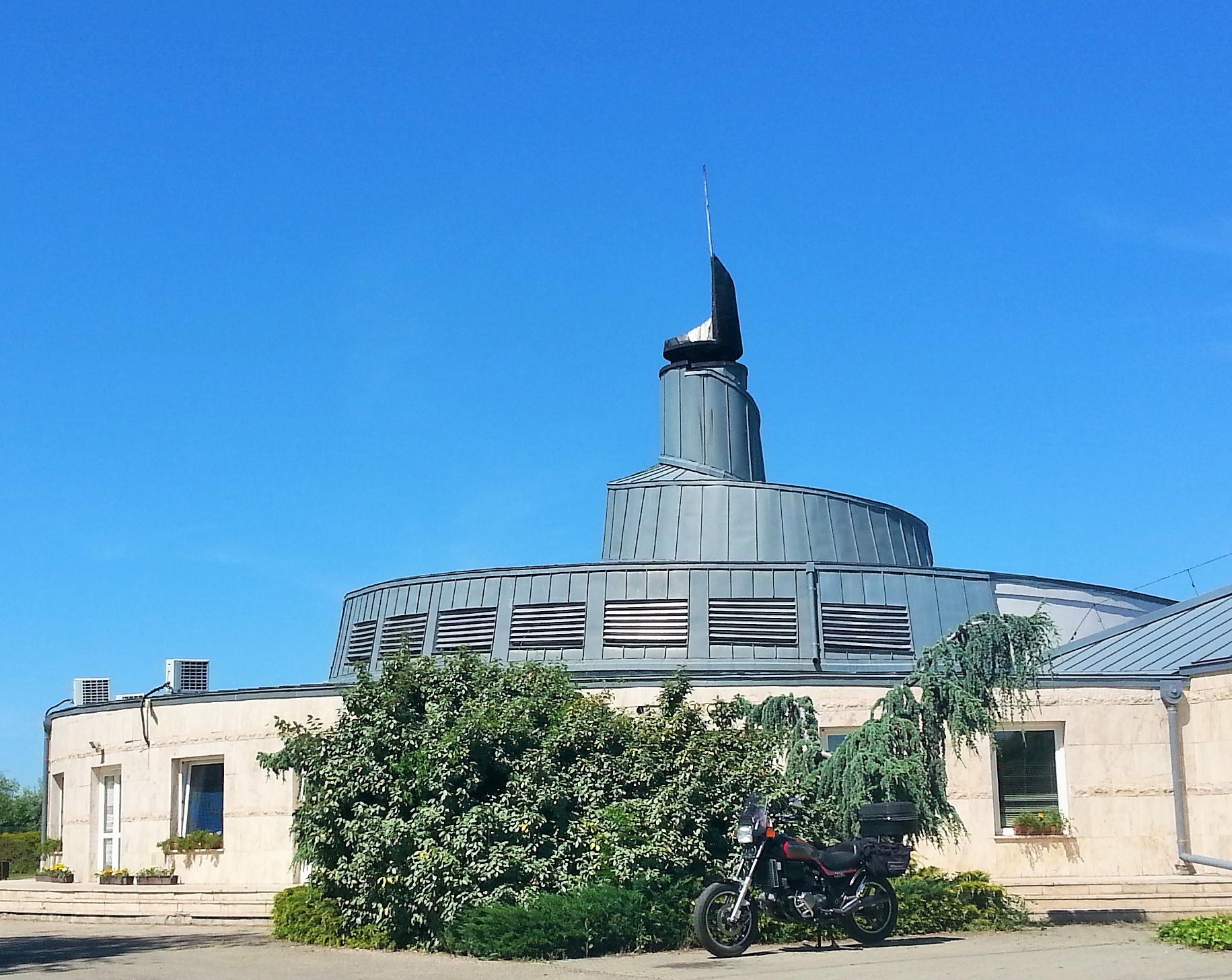
The Csömör Crematorium

== Other factory buildings ==
In addition to the above, there are a large number of small and large industrial buildings in the area of the cemeteries. Examples include guardhouses, custodians' apartments, offices, economic and cemetery buildings. The large pre-1920 building of the Egressy út site of the Capital Funeral Home is no longer visible, it was demolished in 2016.

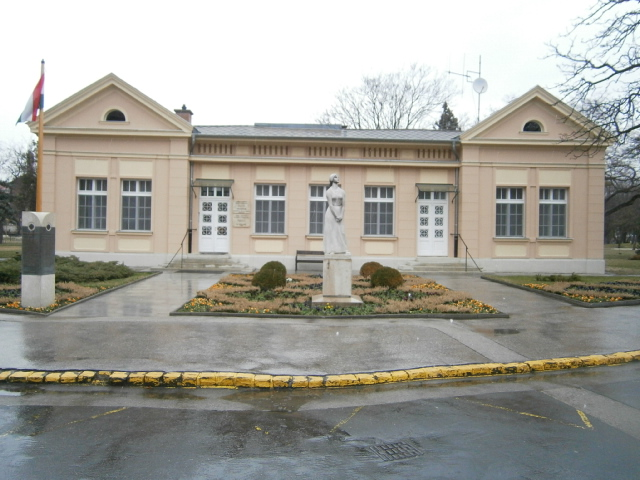
Administration building, Fiumei Úti Sírkert

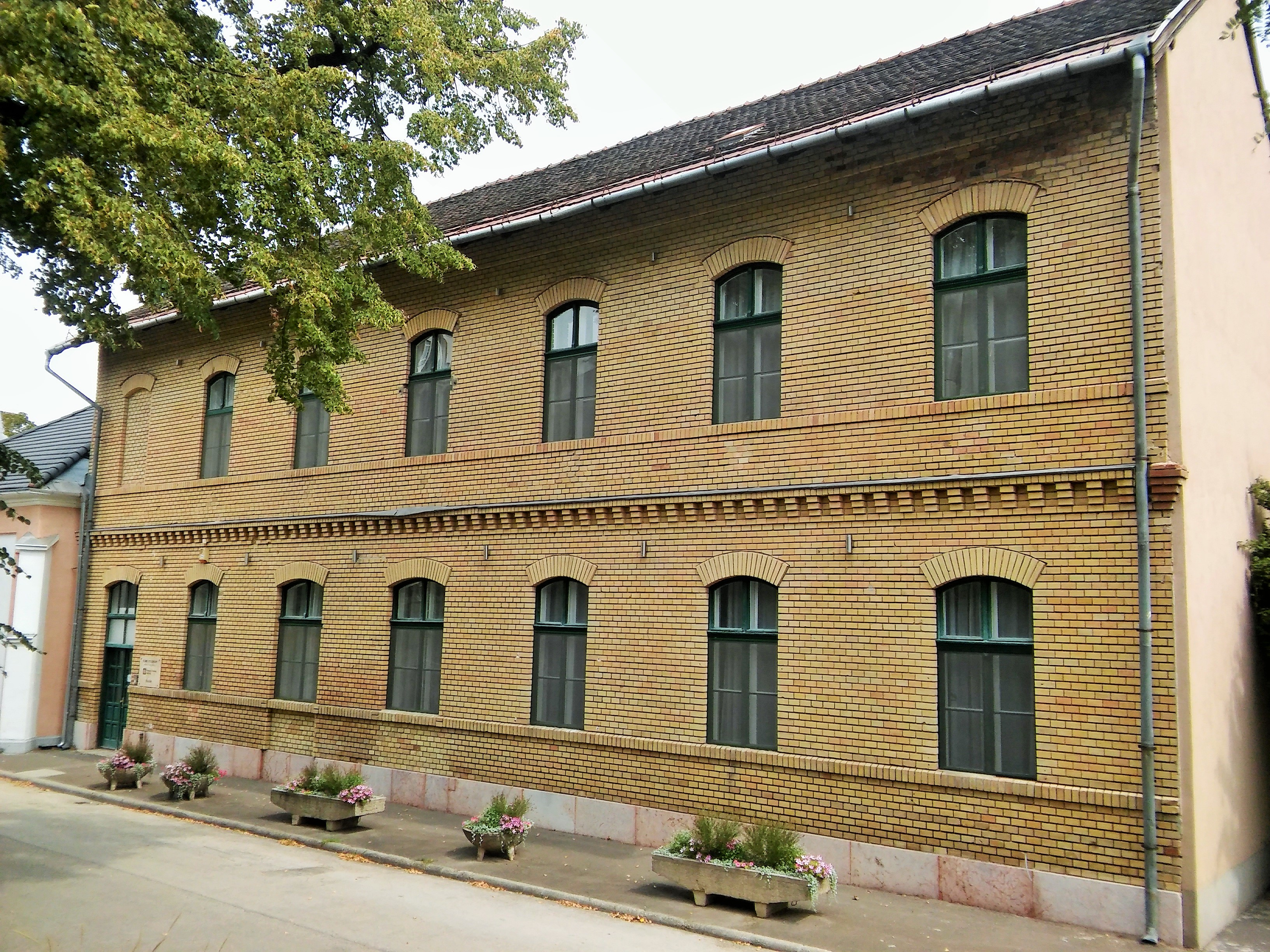
Building of the National Heritage Institute, Fiumei Uti Cemetery

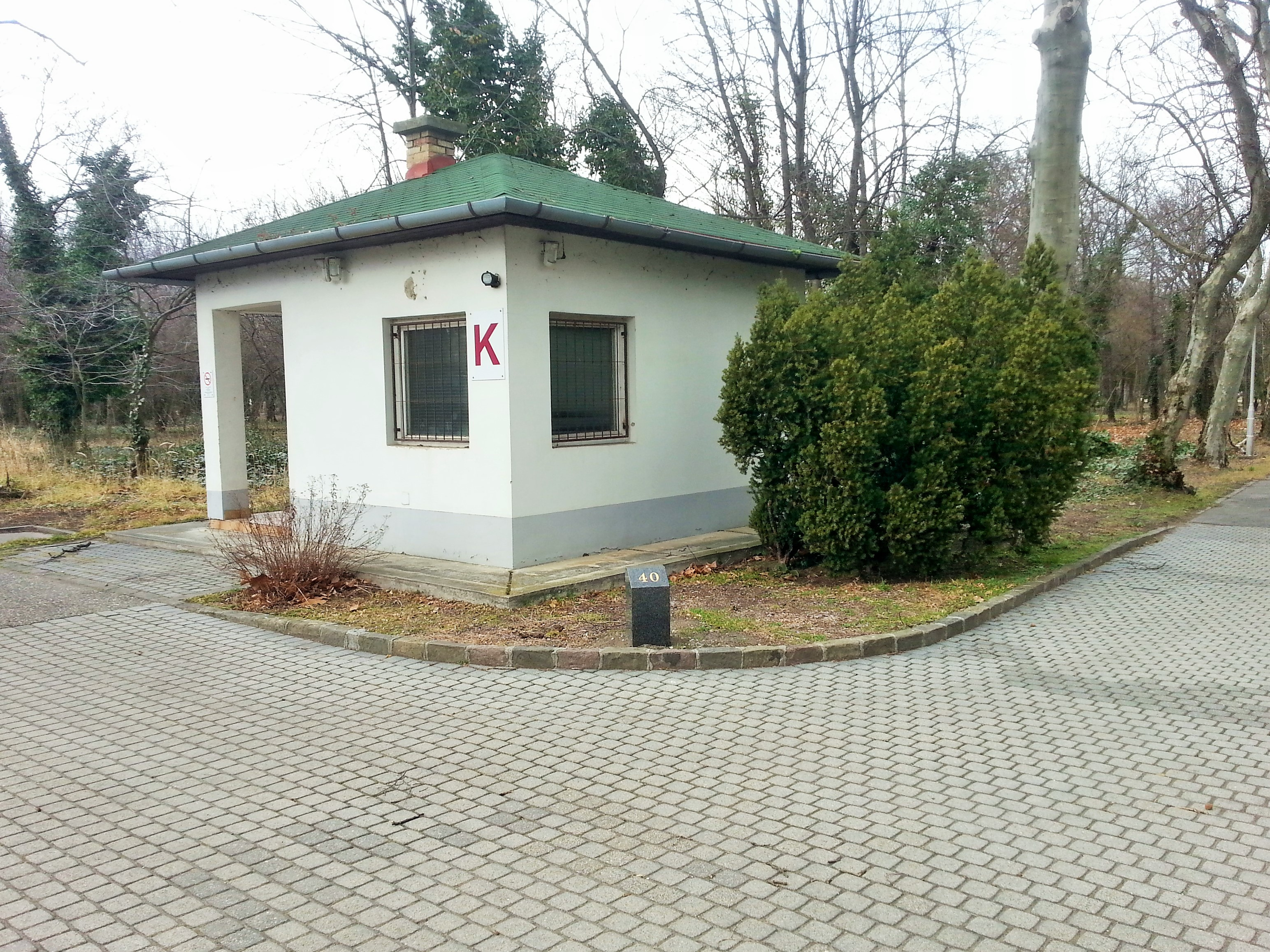
Guardhouse, Riumei Uti Cemetery

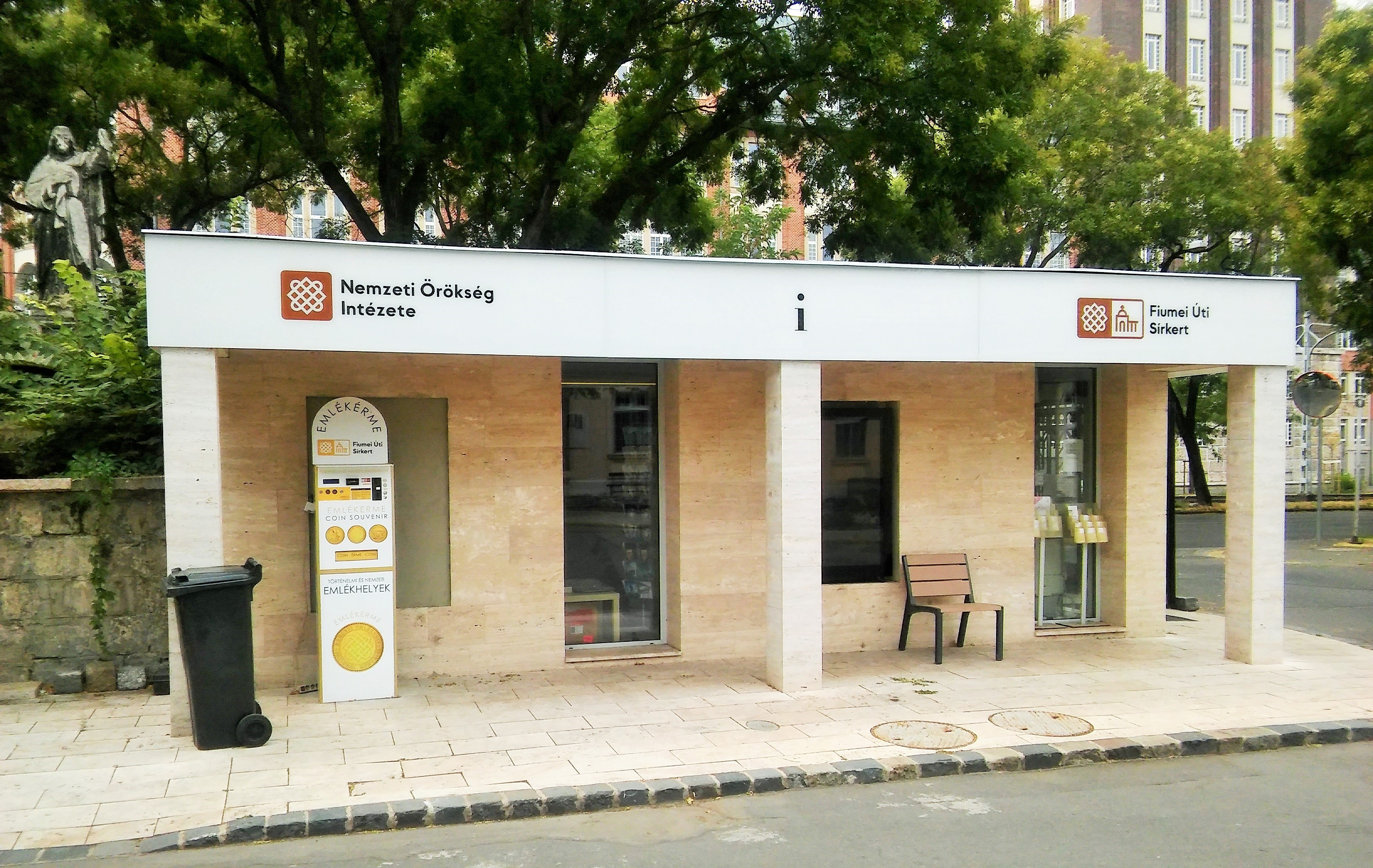
Gift shop, Fiumei Uti Cemetery

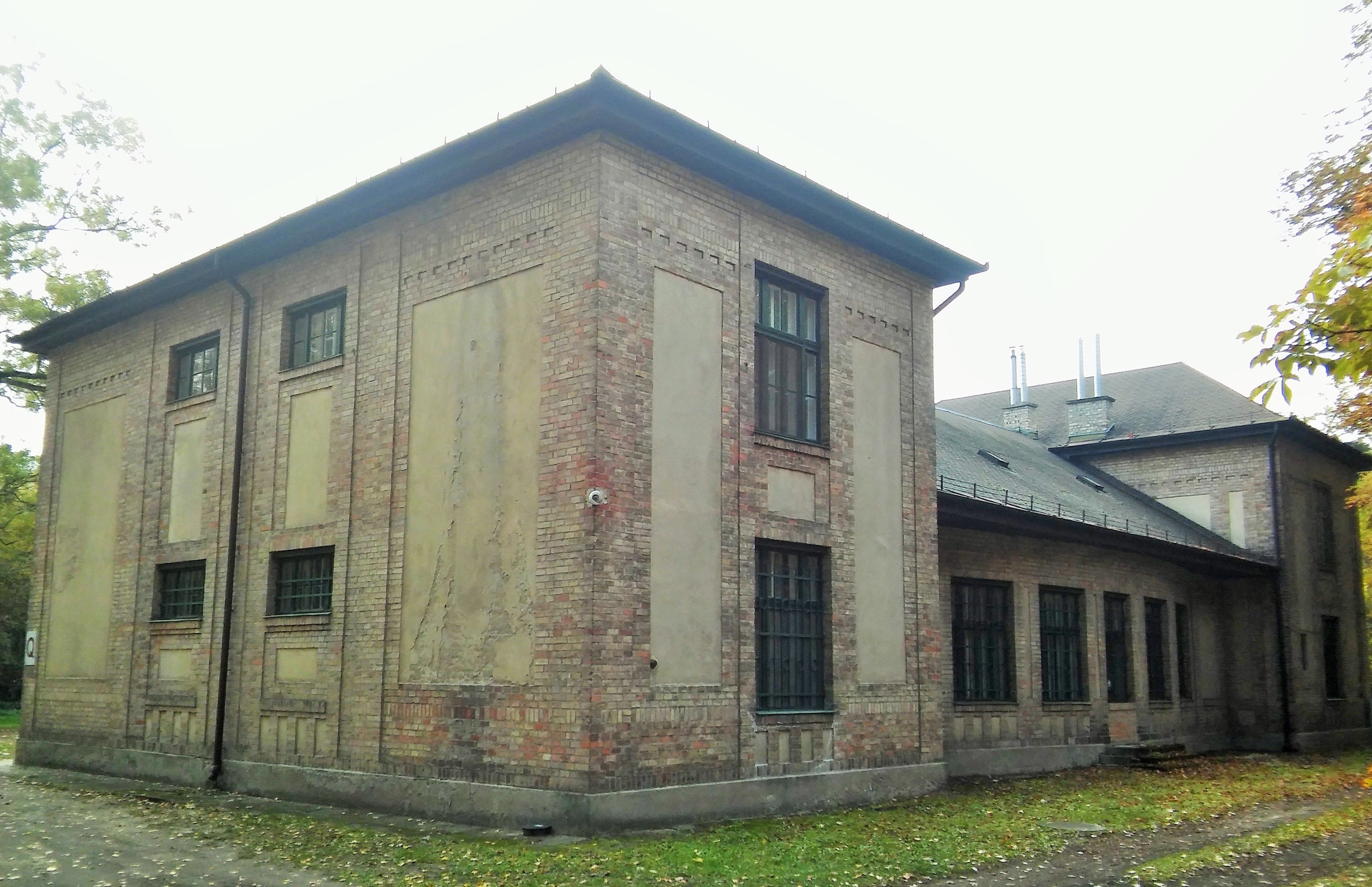
Industrial building, New public cemetery

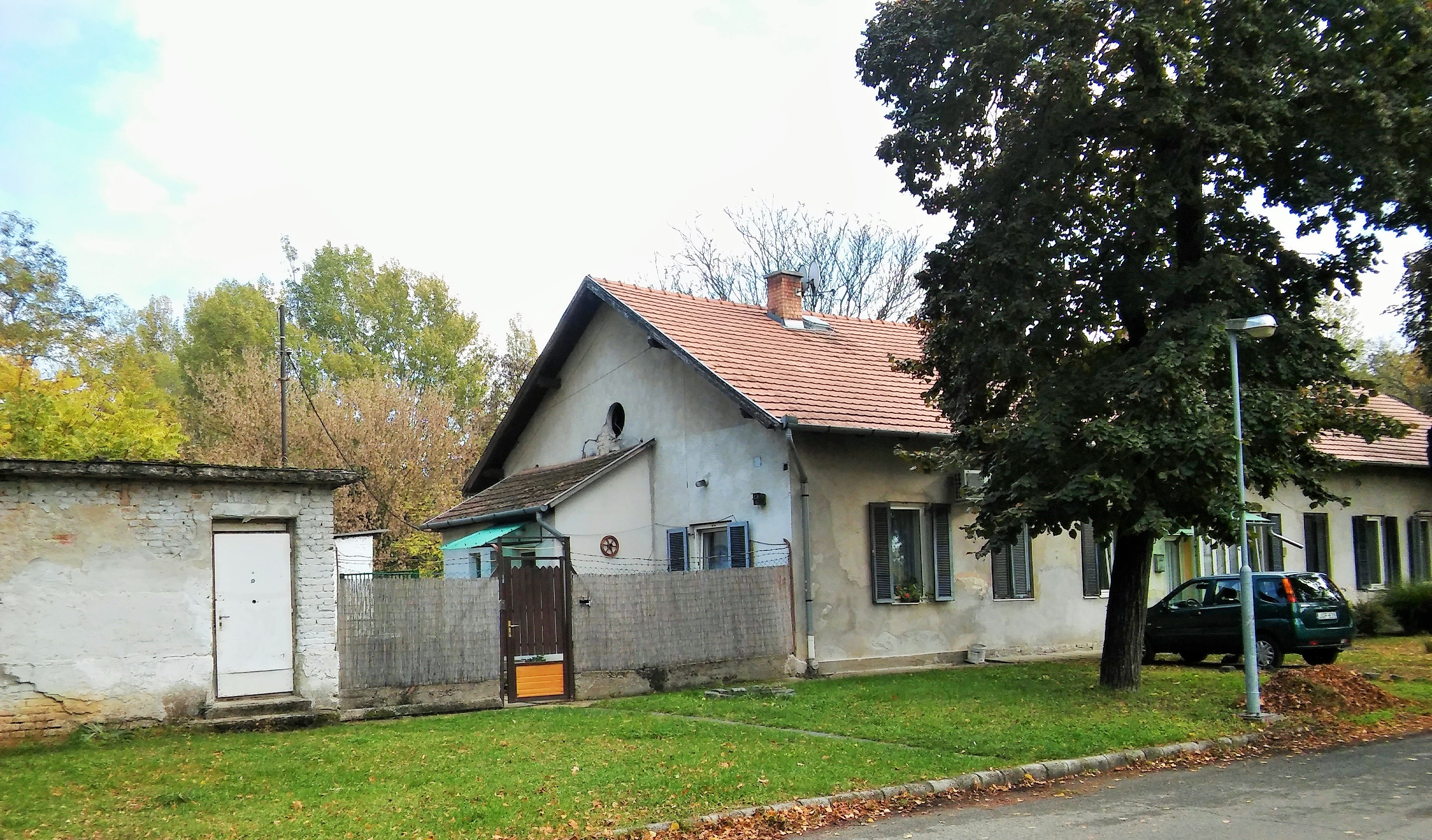
Industrial building, New public cemetery

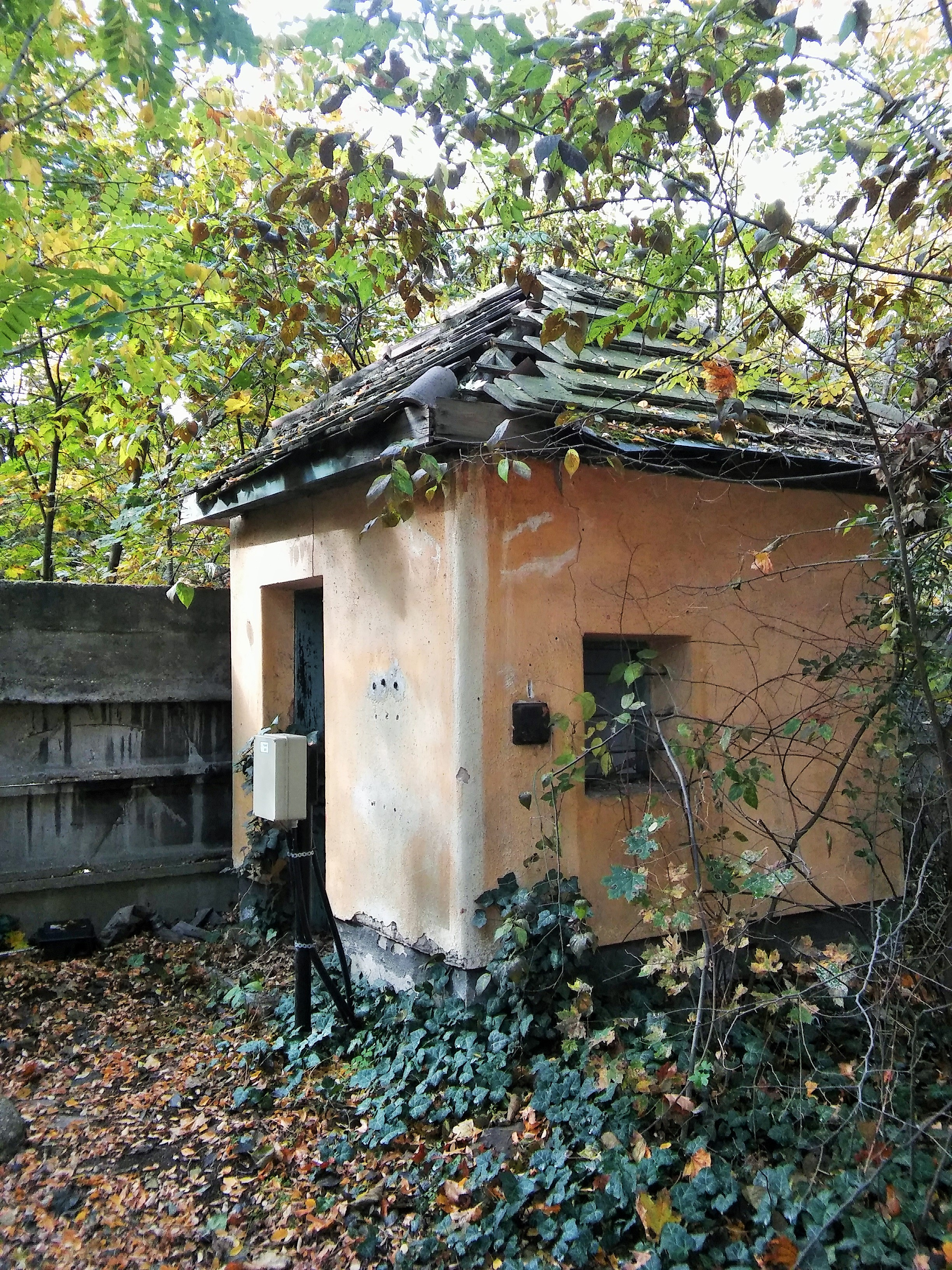
Ruined guard house, New public cemetery

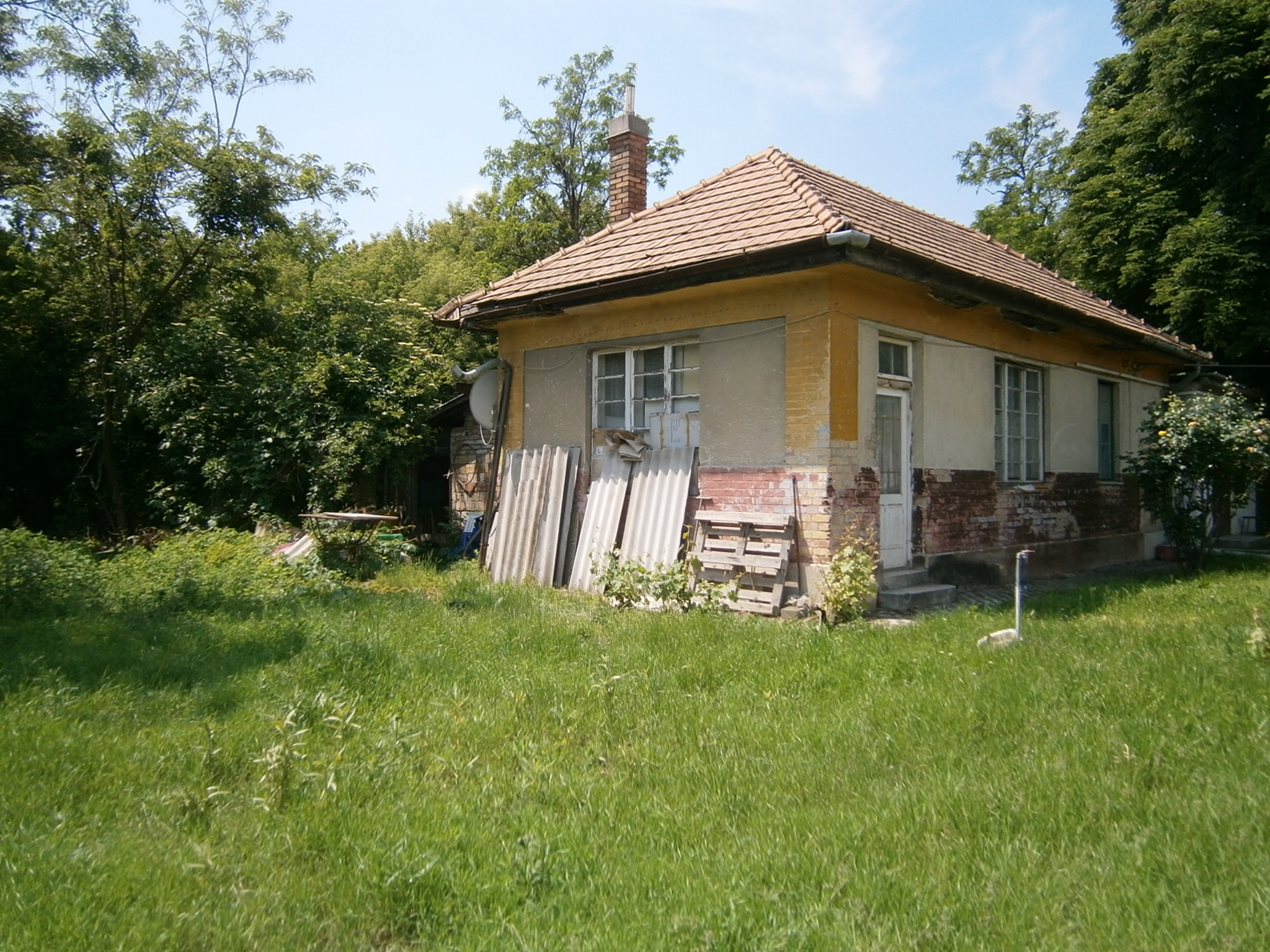
Factory building, Gránátos Street Israelite Cemetery

== Museum ==
There is only one burial history museum in Budapest. The Museum of National Remembrance, previously known as the Mercy Museum - Burial and Mercy Special Collection, is located in one of the buildings of the Cemetery on Fiumei Street.

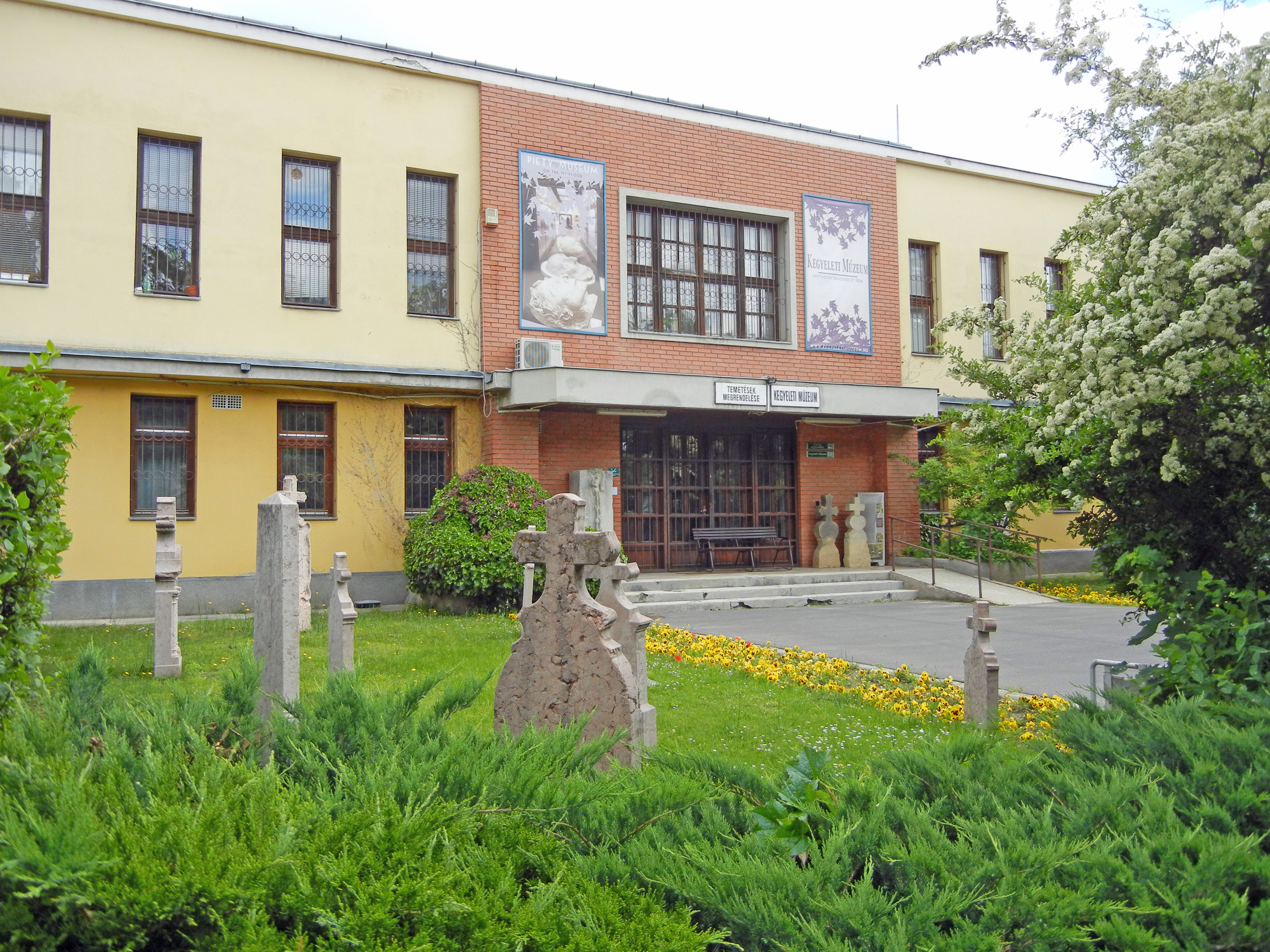
The museum

== Literature ==
- Tóth Vilmos: „Nemzeti nagylétünk nagy temetője”. A Fiumei úti sírkert és a Salgótarjáni utcai zsidó temető adattára, Nemzeti Örökség Intézete, Budapest, 2018, ISBN 978-615-80441-6-5
- Tóth Vilmos: Síremlékművészet, Budapest Főváros Önkormányzata Főpolgármesteri Hivatala, Budapest, 2006, ISBN 963-9669-00-8 (A mi Budapestünk-sorozat)
- Batthyány-mauzóleum. NÖRI-füzetek 6., Nemzeti Örökség Intézete, Budapest, é. n. [2010-es évek]
- Deák-mauzóleum. NÖRI-füzetek 7., Nemzeti Örökség Intézete, Budapest, é. n. [2010-es évek]
- Kossuth-mauzóleum. NÖRI-füzetek 8., Nemzeti Örökség Intézete, Budapest, é. n. [2010-es évek]
- Tóth Vilmos: Fiumei úti sírkert, Nemzeti Emlékhely és Kegyeleti Bizottság, Budapest, 2008, ISBN 978-963-06-4675-8
- Dr. Makoldy Sándor: Magyar panteon. Nemzetünk nagyjainak és kiválóságainak a Kerepesi-temetőben lévő sírjai és síriratai, Szerzői kiadás, Budapest, 1927
- Tóth Vilmos: A Salgótarjáni utcai zsidó temető, Nemzeti Örökség Intézete, Budapest, 2014, ISBN 9789630888325
- Fullér Andrea: Egyiptizáló síremlékek a budapesti zsidó temetőkben a 19–20. század fordulóján
- (szerk.) Dr. Fogarasi Katalin – Haraszti György: Zsidó síremlékek Budapesten, Nemzeti Kegyeleti Bizottság, Budapest, 2004, ISBN 963-214-895-9
- Az örökkévalóság háza. Ismeretterjesztő magazin a Salgótarjáni Utcai Zsidó Temetőről, Nemzeti Kegyeleti Bizottság, Budapest, 2017
- Székely Márton: Építészeti tervpályázatok Magyarországon 1891–1918 között (doktori értekezés), Budapesti Műszaki és Gazdaságtudományi Egyetem Építészettörténeti és Műemléki Tanszék, Budapest, 2019
- Gottdank Tibor: Vidor Emil, a műépítész, Balassi Kiadó Kft., Budapest, 2022, ISBN 9789634561248
- (szerk.) Rozsnyai József: Építőművészek Ybl és Lechner korában, Terc Kereskedelmi és Szolgáltató Kft., Budapest, 2015, ISBN 978-615-5445-12-5
- (szerk.) Rozsnyai József: Építőművészek a historizmustól a modernizmusig, Terc Kereskedelmi és Szolgáltató Kft., Budapest, 2018, ISBN 978-615-5445-52-1
- Vámos Ferenc: Lajta Béla, Akadémiai Kiadó, Budapest, 1970
- Gerle János – Kovács Attila – Makovecz Imre: A századforduló magyar építészete. Szépirodalmi Könyvkiadó, Budapest, 1990, ISBN 963-15-4278-5
- Zöldi Anna: A nekropoliszok aranykora – Art deco temetőművészet (epiteszforum.hu, 2018. márc. 9.)
