= Jagiellonian University =

Academic institution in Kraków, Poland

- Uniwersytet Jagielloński
- Latin: Universitas Iagellonica Cracoviensis
- Former names: Studium Generale (1364–1397); Collegium Regium (1397–1400); Collegium Maius (1400–c. late 1500s); Kraków Academy (c. late 1500s–1777); Principal School of the Realm (1777–1795); Principal School of Kraków (1795–1817)
- Motto: Plus ratio quam vis
- Motto in English: Let reason prevail over force
- Type: Public
- Established: 12 May 1364; 662 years ago
- Founder: King Casimir III the Great
- Affiliations: Coimbra Group; EAIE; Europaeum; EUA; Guild of European Research-Intensive Universities; IRUN; Una Europa; Utrecht Network
- Rector: Piotr Jedynak
- Faculty: 3,921 (2021)
- Students: 33,549 (12.2023)
- Undergraduates: 16,222 (2021)
- Postgraduates: 11,014 (2021)
- Doctoral students: 2,153 (2021)
- Location: Kraków, Poland; 50°03′42″N 19°56′02″E
- Campus: Urban
- Colours: Blue and gold
- Website: en.uj.edu.pl

UNESCO World Heritage Site
- Official name: Kraków Old Town and Jagiellonian University
- Type: Cultural
- Criteria: iv, vi
- Designated: 1978 (2nd session)
- Reference no.: 29
- Region: Europe and North America

Location of Jagiellonian University in Kraków within Poland

The Jagiellonian University (/ˌjɑːɡjəˈləʊ.ni.ən/; Polish: Uniwersytet Jagielloński, UJ) is a public research university in Kraków, Poland. Founded in 1364 by King Casimir III the Great, it is the oldest university in Poland and one of the oldest universities in continuous operation in the world. The university grounds form part of the Kraków Old Town, a UNESCO World Heritage Site. The university has been viewed as a vanguard of Polish culture as well as a significant contributor to the intellectual heritage of Europe.

The campus of the Jagiellonian University is centrally located within the city of Kraków. The university consists of thirteen main faculties, in addition to three faculties composing the Collegium Medicum. It employs roughly 4,000 academics and provides education to more than 35,000 students who study in 166 fields. The main language of instruction is Polish, although around 30 degrees are offered in English and some in German. The university library and Collegium Novium house a significant number of medieval and Renaissance art pieces and manuscripts, including the landmark De revolutionibus orbium coelestium by the university alumnus Nicolaus Copernicus.

In addition to Copernicus, the university's notable alumni include heads of state King John III Sobieski, Pope John Paul II, and Andrzej Duda; Polish prime ministers Beata Szydło and Józef Cyrankiewicz; renowned cultural figures Jan Kochanowski, Stanisław Lem, and Krzysztof Penderecki; and leading intellectuals and researchers such as Hugo Kołłątaj, Bronisław Malinowski, Carl Menger, Leo Sternbach, and Norman Davies. Four Nobel laureates have been affiliated with the university, all in literature: Ivo Andrić and Wisława Szymborska, who studied there, and Czesław Miłosz and Olga Tokarczuk, who taught there. Faculty and graduates of the university have been elected to the Polish Academy of Arts and Sciences, the Royal Society, the British Academy, the American Academy of Arts and Sciences, and other honorary societies.

== History ==
=== Founding the university ===
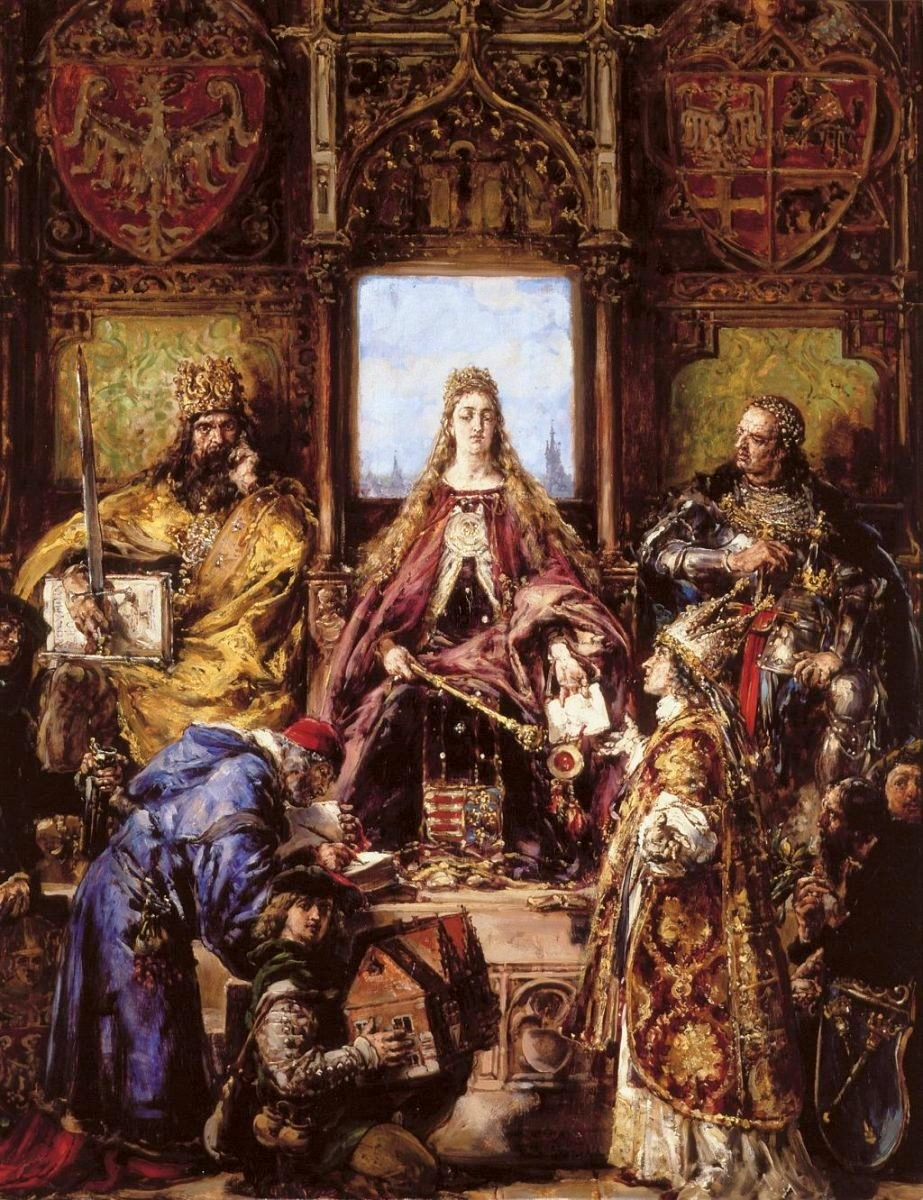
The founding of the university in 1364, painted by Jan Matejko (1838–1893)

In the mid-14th century, King Casimir III the Great realised that the nation needed a class of educated people, especially lawyers, who could arrange a better set of the country's laws and administer the courts and offices. His efforts to found an institution of higher learning in Poland were rewarded when Pope Urban V granted him permission to set up a university in Kraków. A royal charter of foundation was issued on 12 May 1364, and a simultaneous document was issued by the city council granting privileges to the Studium Generale.

Development of the University of Kraków stalled upon the death of Casimir III, and lectures were held in various places across the city, including, amongst others, in professors' houses, churches and in the cathedral school on the Wawel Hill. It is believed that the construction of a building to house the Studium Generale began on Plac Wolnica in what is today the district of Kazimierz.

After a period of low interest and lack of funds, the institution was restored in the 1390s by Jadwiga, king of Poland, the daughter of Louis the Great. The royal couple, Jadwiga and her husband Władysław II Jagiełło decided that, instead of building new premises for the university, it would be better to buy an existing edifice; it was thus that a building on Żydowska Street, which had previously been the property of the Pęcherz family, was acquired in 1399. The queen donated all of her personal jewellery to the university, allowing it to enroll 203 students.

Following Jadwiga's death in 1399, her husband of Lithuanian origin Władysław II Jagiełło became the sole monarch of the Kingdom of Poland who on 26 July 1400 had reformed the university based on the model of the Sorbonne University and the Faculty of Theology was established. In ~1400, a bourse of Lithuanian students (a shared accommodation, maintenance and education institution) was established and in the 15th-16th centuries more than 300 Lithuanian students studied in the university, including one of the creators of the Lithuanian language writing Abraomas Kulvietis and Stanislovas Rapalionis. In 1401, the Lithuanian duke Jonas Vaidutis, a grandson of the former Lithuanian monarch Kęstutis and a relative of Władysław II Jagiełło from the Gediminids dynasty, was elected as the second rector of the university.

The faculties of astronomy, law and theology attracted eminent scholars: for example, John Cantius, Stanisław of Skarbimierz, Paweł Włodkowic, Jan of Głogów, Sandivogius of Czechel and Albert Brudzewski, who from 1491 to 1495 was one of Nicolaus Copernicus' teachers. The university was the first university in Europe to establish independent chairs in Mathematics and Astronomy. This rapid expansion in the university's faculty necessitated the purchase of larger premises in which to house them; it was thus that the building known today as the Collegium Maius, with its quadrangle and beautiful arcade, came into being towards the beginning of the 15th century. The Collegium Maius' qualities, many of which directly contributed to the sheltered, academic atmosphere at the university, became widely respected, helping the university establish its reputation as a place of learning in Central Europe.

=== Golden age of the Renaissance ===
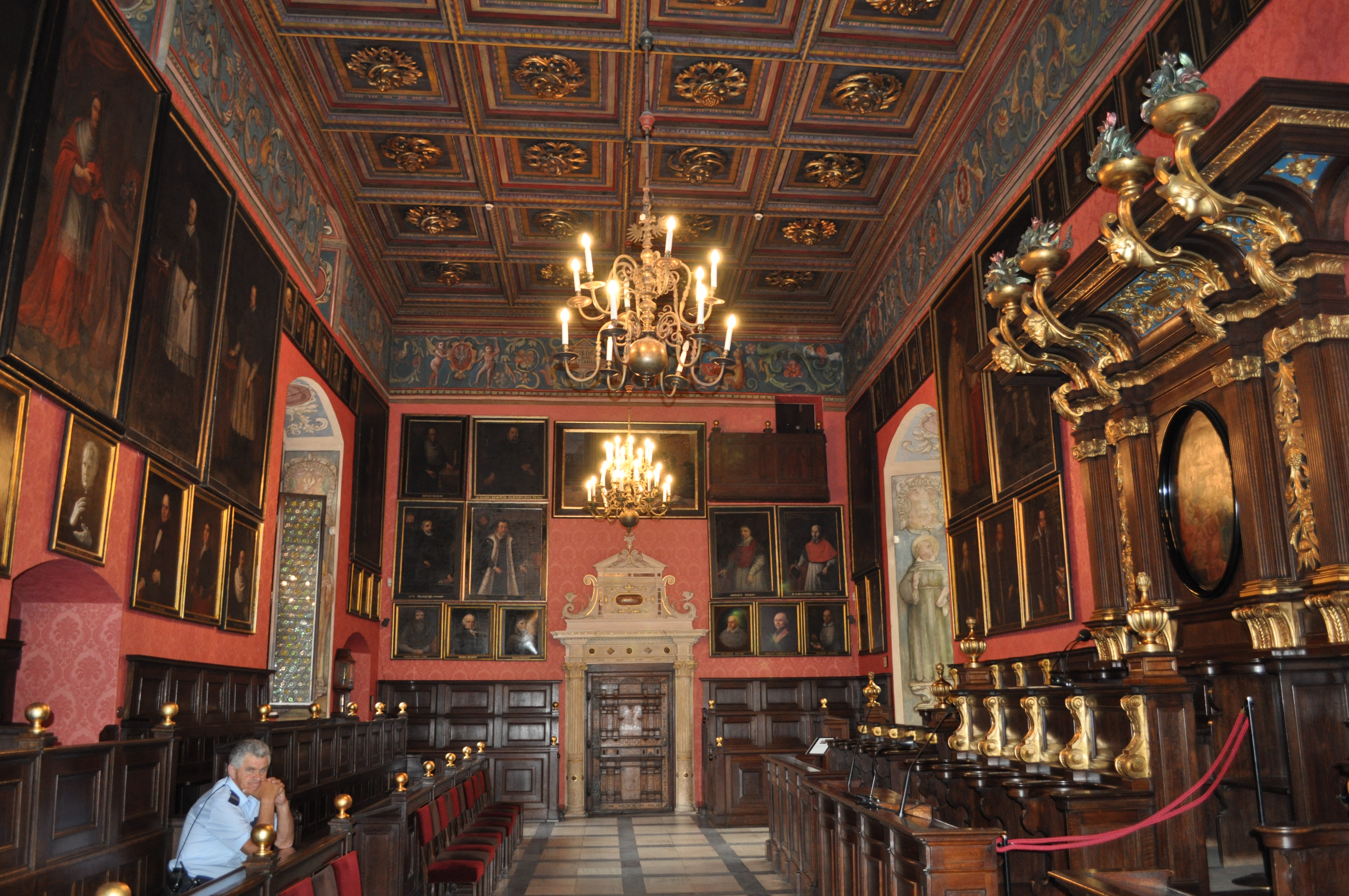
The main assembly hall of the university's Collegium Maius

For several centuries, almost the entire intellectual elite of Poland was educated at the university, where they enjoyed particular royal favors. While it was, and largely remains, Polish students who make up the majority of the university's students, it has, over its long history, educated thousands of foreign students from countries such as Lithuania, Russia, Hungary, Bohemia, Germany, and Spain. During the second half of the 15th century, over 40 percent of students came from the outside of the Kingdom of Poland.

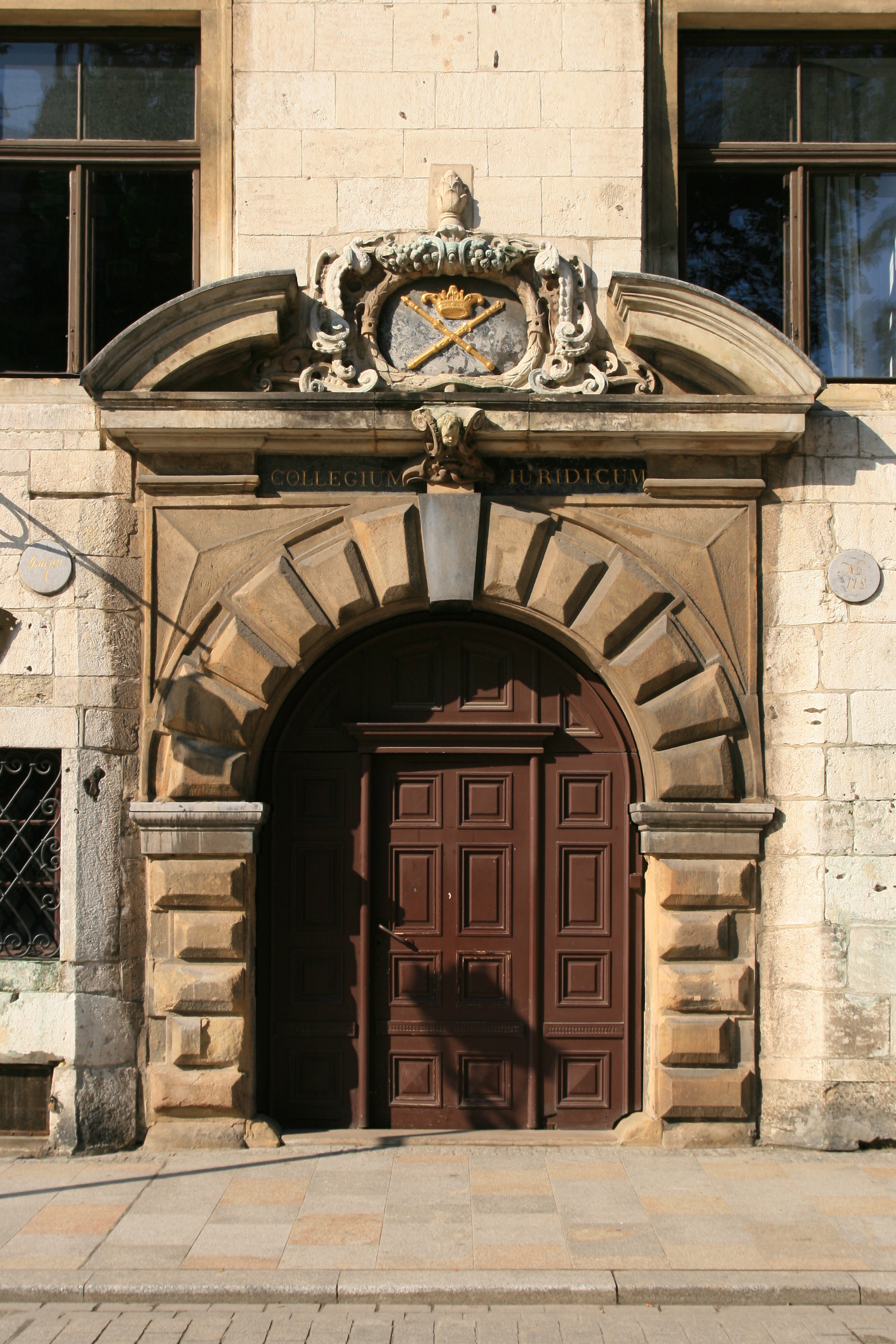
The main baroque entrance to the university's Collegium Iuridicum

The first chancellor of the university was Piotr Wysz, and the first professors were Czechs, Germans and Poles, most of them trained at the Charles University in Prague. By 1520 Greek philology was introduced by Constanzo Claretti and Wenzel von Hirschberg; Hebrew was also taught. At this time, the Collegium Maius consisted of seven reading rooms, six of which were named for the great ancient scholars: Aristotle, Socrates, Plato, Galen, Ptolemy, and Pythagoras. Furthermore, it was during this period that the faculties of Law, Medicine, Theology, and Philosophy were established in their own premises; two of these buildings, the Collegium Iuridicum and Collegium Minus, survive to this day. The golden era of the University of Kraków took place during the Polish Renaissance, between 1500 and 1535, when it was attended by 3,215 students in the first decade of the 16th century, and it was in these years that the foundations for the Jagiellonian Library were set, which allowed for the addition of a library floor to the Collegium Maius. The library's original rooms in which all books were chained to their cases in order to prevent theft are no longer used as such. However, they are still occasionally open to hosting visiting lecturers' talks.

As the university's popularity, along with that of the ever more provincial Kraków's, declined in later centuries, the number of students attending the university also fell and, as such, the attendance record set in the early 16th-century wasn't surpassed until the late 18th century. This phenomenon was recorded as part of a more general economic and political decline seen in the Polish–Lithuanian Commonwealth, which was suffering from the effects of poor governance and the policies of hostile neighbors at the time. In fact, despite a number of expansion projects during the late 18th century, many of the university's buildings had fallen into disrepair and were being used for a range of other purposes; in the university's archives, there is one entry which reads: 'Nobody lives in the building, nothing happens there. If the lecture halls underwent refurbishment they could be rented out to accommodate a laundry'. This period thus represents one of the darkest periods in the university's history and is almost certainly the one during which the closure of the institution seemed most imminent.

=== Turmoil and near closure after the partitions ===
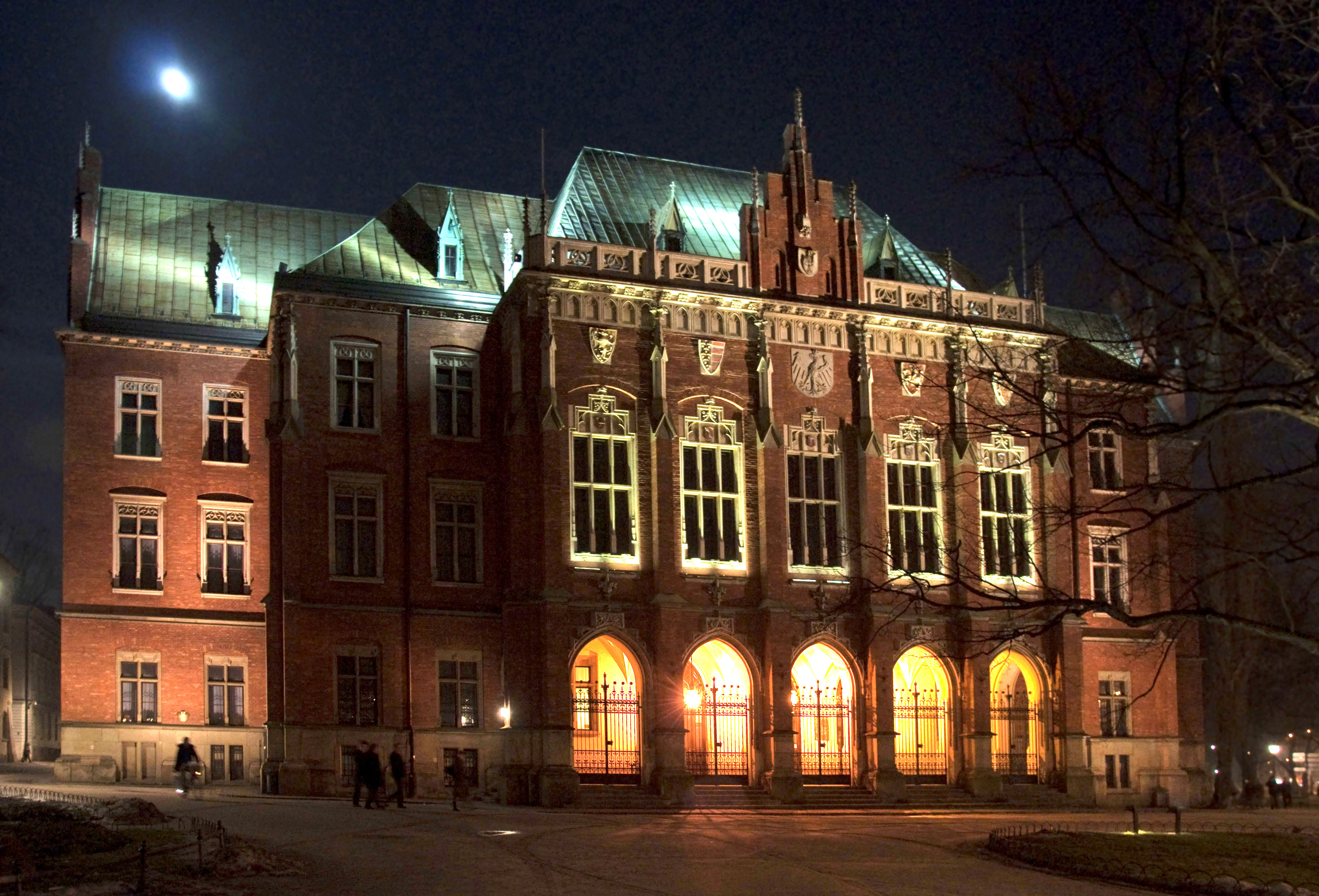
The Collegium Novum in the Old Town District

After the third partition of Poland in 1795 and the ensuing Napoleonic Wars, Kraków became a free city under the protection of the Austrian Empire; this, however, was not to last long. In 1846, after the Kraków Uprising, the city and its university became part of the Austrian Empire. The Austrians were in many ways hostile to the institution and, soon after their arrival, removed many of the furnishings from the Collegium Maius' Auditorium Maximum in order to convert it into a grain store. However, the threat of closure of the university was ultimately dissipated by Ferdinand I of Austria's decree to maintain it. By the 1870s the fortunes of the university had improved so greatly that many scholars had returned. The liquefaction of nitrogen and oxygen was successfully demonstrated by professors Zygmunt Wróblewski and Karol Olszewski in 1883. Thereafter the Austrian authorities took on a new role in the development of the university and provided funds for the construction of a number of new buildings, including the neo-gothic Collegium Novum, which opened in 1887. It was, conversely, from this building that in 1918 a large painting of Kaiser Franz Joseph I was removed and destroyed by Polish students advocating the reestablishment of an independent Polish state.

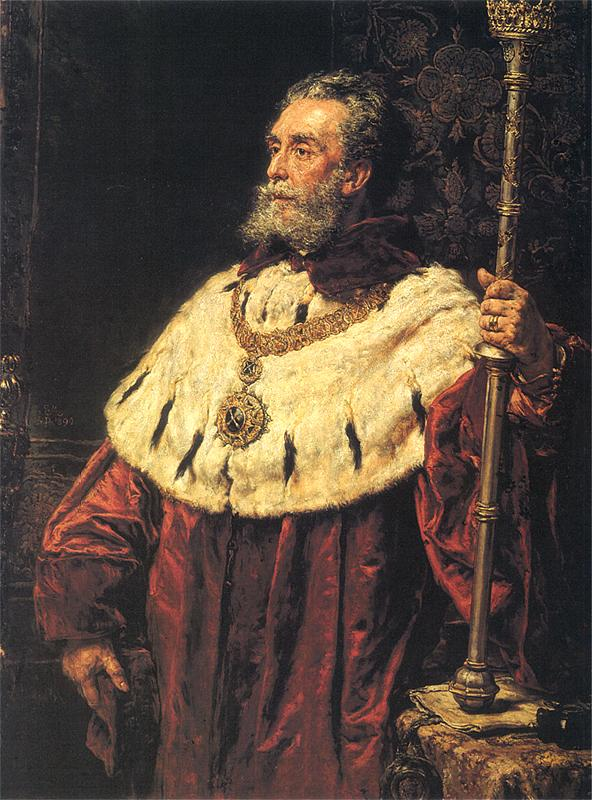
Count Stanisław Tarnowski was, between 1871 and 1909, twice rector of the university.

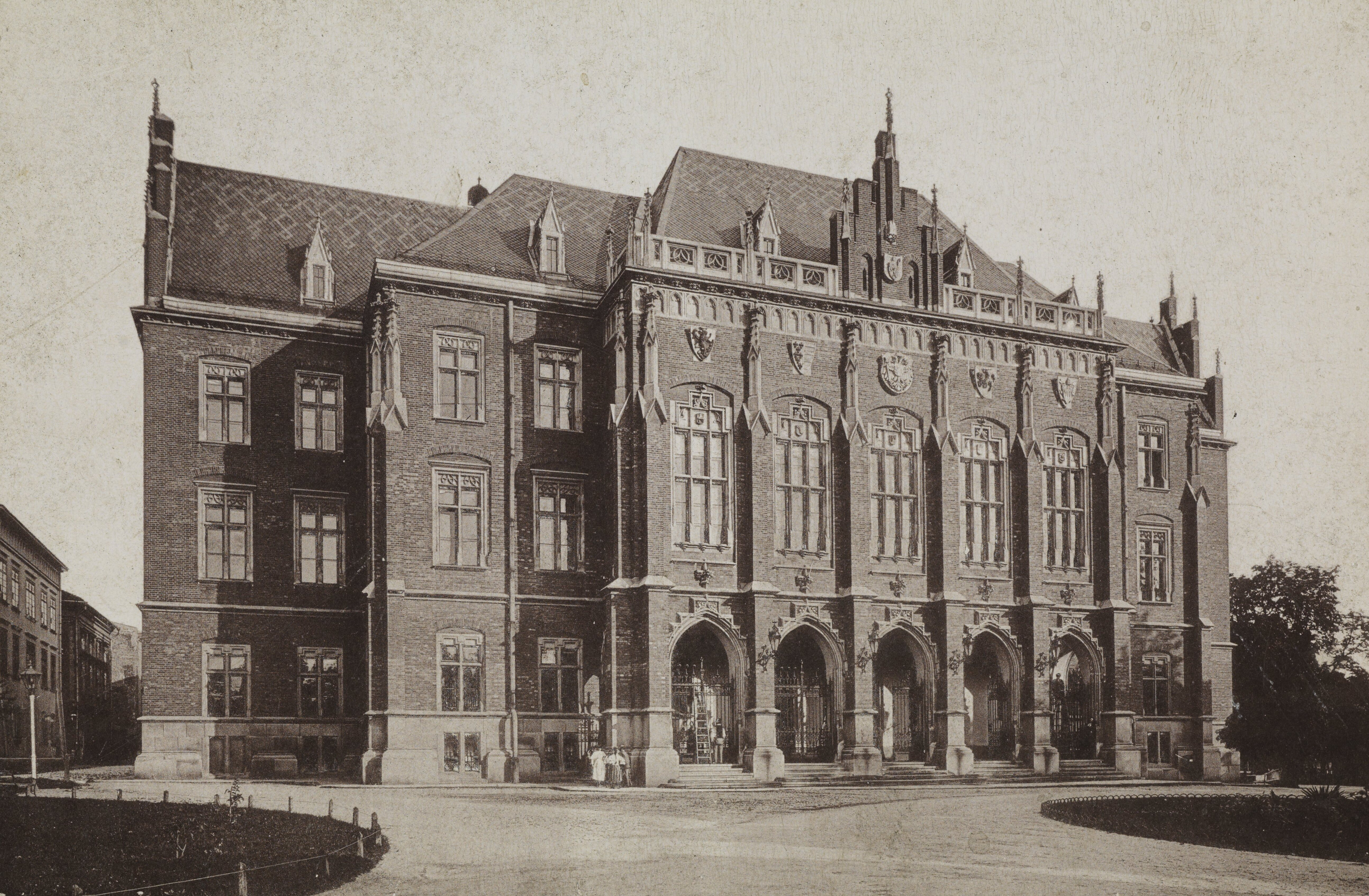
The university around 1900

For the 500th anniversary of the university's foundation, a monument to Copernicus was placed in the quadrangle of the Collegium Maius; this statue is now to be found in the direct vicinity of the Collegium Novum, outside the Collegium Witkowskiego, to where it was moved in 1953. Nevertheless, it was in the Grzegórzecka and the Kopernika areas that much of the university's expansion took place up to 1918; during this time the Collegium Medicum was relocated to a site just east of the centre, and was expanded with the addition of a number of modern teaching hospitals – this 'medical campus' remains to this day. By the late 1930s, the number of students at the university had increased dramatically to almost 6,000. Now a major centre for education in the independent Republic of Poland, the university attained government support for the purchase of building plots for new premises, as a result of which a number of residencies were built for students and professors alike. However, of all the projects begun during this era, the most important would have to be the creation of the Jagiellonian Library. The library's monumental building, construction of which began in 1931, was finally completed towards the end of the interwar period, which allowed the university's many varied literary collections to be relocated to their new home by the outbreak of war in 1939.

=== Modern era and renovation ===
On 6 November 1939, following the German invasion of Poland, 184 professors were arrested and deported to Sachsenhausen concentration camp during an operation codenamed Sonderaktion Krakau (Special Operation Krakow). The university, along with the rest of Poland's higher and secondary education, was closed for the remainder of World War II. Despite the university's reopening after the cessation of hostilities in 1945, the new government of Poland was hostile to the teachings of the pre-war university and the faculty was suppressed by the Communists in 1954. By 1957 the Polish government decided that it would invest in the establishment of new facilities near Jordan Park and expansion of other smaller existing facilities. Construction work proved slow and many of the stated goals were never achieved; it was this poor management that eventually led a number of scholars to openly criticise the government for its apparent lack of interest in educational development and disregard for the university's future. A number of new buildings, such as the Collegium Paderevianum, were built with funds from the legacy of Ignacy Paderewski.

By 1989, Poland had overthrown its Communist government. In that same year, the Jagiellonian University successfully completed the purchase of its first building plot in Pychowice, Kraków, where, from 2000, construction began of a new complex of university buildings, the so-called Third Campus. The new campus, officially named the '600th Anniversary Campus', was developed in conjunction with the new LifeScience Park, which is managed by the Jagiellonian Centre for Innovation, the university's research consortium. Public funds earmarked for the project amounted to 946.5 million zlotys, or 240 million euros. Poland's entry into the European Union in 2004 has proved instrumental in improving the fortunes of the Jagiellonian University, which has seen huge increases in funding from both central government and European authorities, allowing it to develop new departments, research centres, and better support the work of its students and academics.

=== International partnerships ===
The university's academic advancement in both Poland and abroad is illustrated by its widely recognized research achievements. The scientists and physicians from the Collegium Medicum carry out pioneer studies, e.g. in cardiac surgery, urology and neurology, often leading to the development of novel treatment methods. Their findings have been published in international journals such as European Journal of Cardio-Thoracic Medicine, The New England Journal of Medicine, and The Lancet. UJ archaeologists lead explorations of ancient sites in various parts of the world, including Egypt, Cyprus, Central America, South Asia, and Altay. The astronomers take part in major international projects, including H.E.S.S. and VIPERS. The work of UJ biotechnologists has been published in numerous journals, including Bioorganic & Medicinal Chemistry, Molecular Ecology Resources, and European Journal of Human Genetics.

In the English-speaking world, the Jagiellonian University has international partnerships with the University of Cambridge, University of Melbourne, University of Chicago, University of California, Los Angeles, London School of Economics, University of Rochester, University of California, Irvine, and Case Western Reserve University. In the French-speaking world, partner universities include the Sorbonne and the University of Montpellier. UJ also maintains strong academic partnership with Heidelberg University, Germany's oldest university. The Jagiellonian University offers specializations in German law, in conjunction with Heidelberg University and Johannes Gutenberg University of Mainz.

Other cooperation agreements exist with Charles University Prague, University of Vienna, University of Tokyo, Saint Petersburg State University, Technical University of Munich, and Free University of Berlin.

== Libraries ==
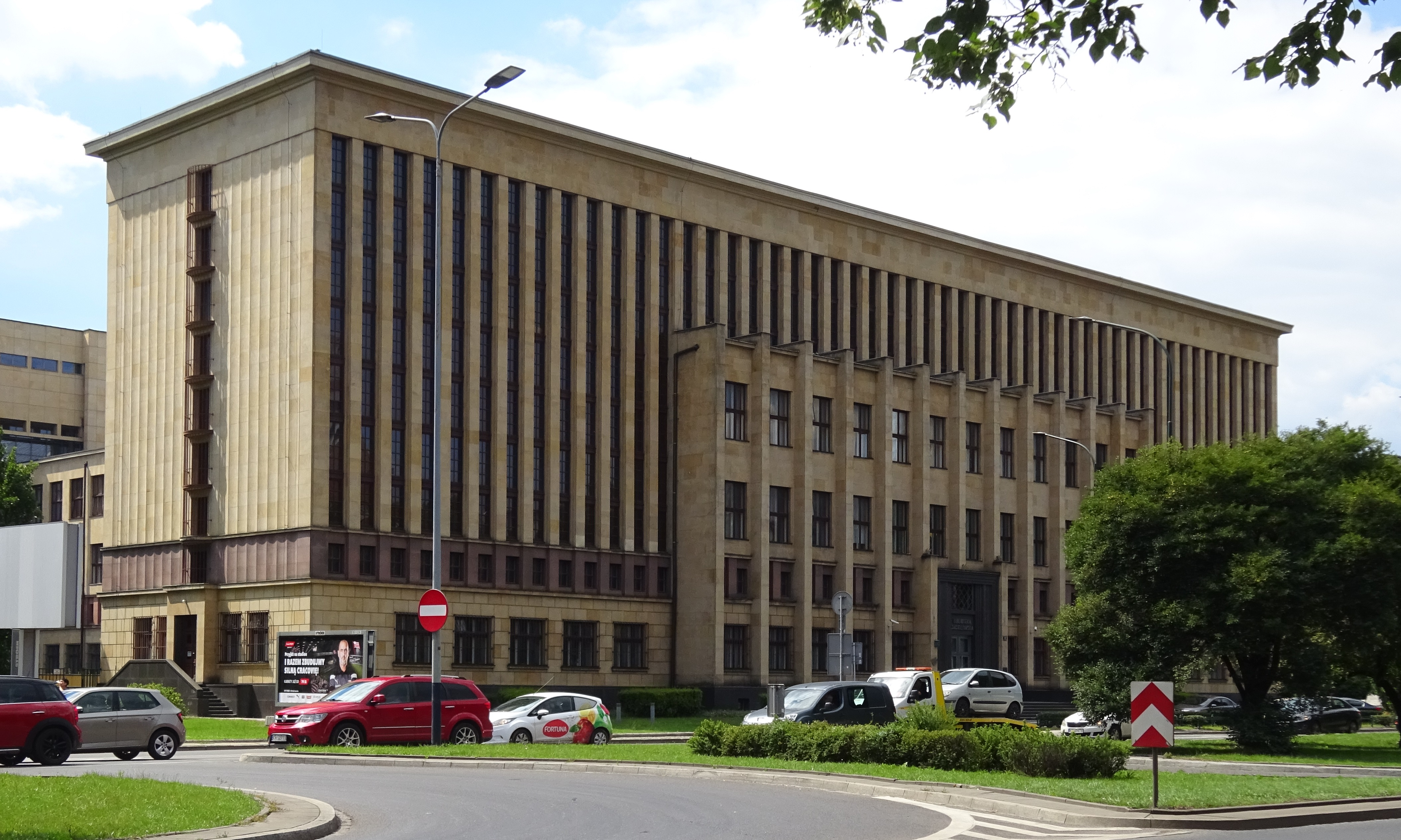
The Jagiellonian Library's main site

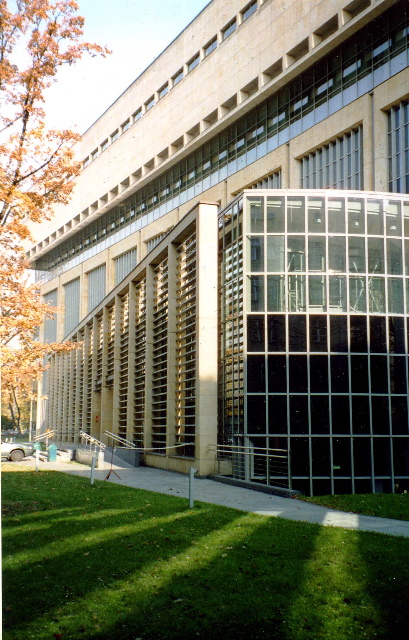
The Jagiellonian Library extension

The university's main library, the Jagiellonian Library (Biblioteka Jagiellońska), is one of Poland's largest, with almost 6.5 million volumes; it is a constituent of the Polish National Libraries system. It is home to a world-renowned collection of medieval manuscripts, which includes Copernicus' De Revolutionibus, the Balthasar Behem Codex and the Berlinka. The library also has an extensive collection of underground political literature (so-called drugi obieg or samizdat) from Poland's period of Communist rule between 1945 and 1989.

The beginning of the Jagiellonian Library is traditionally considered the same as that of the entire university – in 1364; however, instead of having one central library, it had several smaller branches in buildings of various departments (the largest collection was in Collegium Maius, where works related to theology and liberal arts were kept). After 1775, during the reforms of Komisja Edukacji Narodowej, which established the first Ministry of Education in the world, various small libraries of the university were formally centralised into one public collection in Collegium Maius. During the partitions of Poland, the library continued to grow, primarily owing to individuals such as Karol Józef Teofil Estreicher and Karol Estreicher, who dedicated significant effort and support to its expansion. Its collections were made public in 1812. Since 1932, it has been recognised as a legal deposit library, comparable to the Bodleian Library at the University of Oxford, Cambridge University Library at the University of Cambridge, or the Library of Trinity College Dublin at Trinity College Dublin, and thus has the right to receive a copy of any book issued by Polish publishers within Poland. In 1940, the library finally obtained a new building of its own, which has subsequently been expanded on two occasions, most recently in 1995–2001. During World War II, library workers cooperated with underground universities. Since the communist rule's end in Poland in the late 1980s and early 1990s, the library's collection has become increasingly digitised.

In addition to the Jagiellonian Library, the university maintains a large medical library (Biblioteka Medyczna) and many other subject-specialised libraries in its various faculties and institutes. Finally, the university libraries' collections are enriched by the presence of the university's archives, which date back to the university's own foundation and record the entire history of its development up to the present day.

== Rankings ==
University rankings

Global – Overall
- CWTS World: 253 (2022)
- QS World: =303 (2026)
- QS Employability: 201-250 (2022)
- USNWR Global: 320 (2022)

Regional – Overall
- QS Emerging Europe and Central Asia: 5 (2022)

National – Overall
- CWTS National: 1 (2022)
- CWUR National: 1 (2022)

== Faculties and departments ==
The university is divided into the following faculties, which have different organisational sub-structures partly reflecting their history and partly their operational needs. Teaching and research at UJ are organised by these faculties, including a number of additional institutes:

- Jagiellonian University Medical College
  - Medicine
  - Pharmacy
  - Health Care
- Law and Administration
- Philosophy
- History
- Philology
- Polish Language and Literature
- Physics, Astronomy and Applied Computer Science
- Mathematics and Computer Science
- Chemistry
- Biology
- Earth Sciences
- Management and Social Communication
- International and Political Studies
- Biochemistry, Biophysics and Biotechnology
- University Center of Veterinary Medicine (joint faculty with Agricultural University of Kraków)
- National Center of Synchrotron Radiation SOLARIS (off-departmental facility)

The Jagiellonian University Medical College owns the following hospitals and clinics:

- University Hospital in Krakow-Prokocim; the new seat of the University Hospital has been recently opened at Prokocim in 2019, as a result of more than 1.2 billion zloty investment projects; as 2022 the University Hospital in Krakow is the biggest supra-regional public hospital in Poland and comprises: 37 clinical departments, 12 diagnostic and research institutes, and 71 out-patient units.
- Children's University Hospital in Krakow
- University Hospital for Orthopedics and Rehabilitation in Zakopane
- Dental University Clinic in Krakow

It is also affiliated with the John Paul II's Specialist Hospital in Krakow,

== Publications ==
- Electrum, journal published since 1997 by the Department of Ancient History as a collection of papers and monographs

== Notable alumni ==
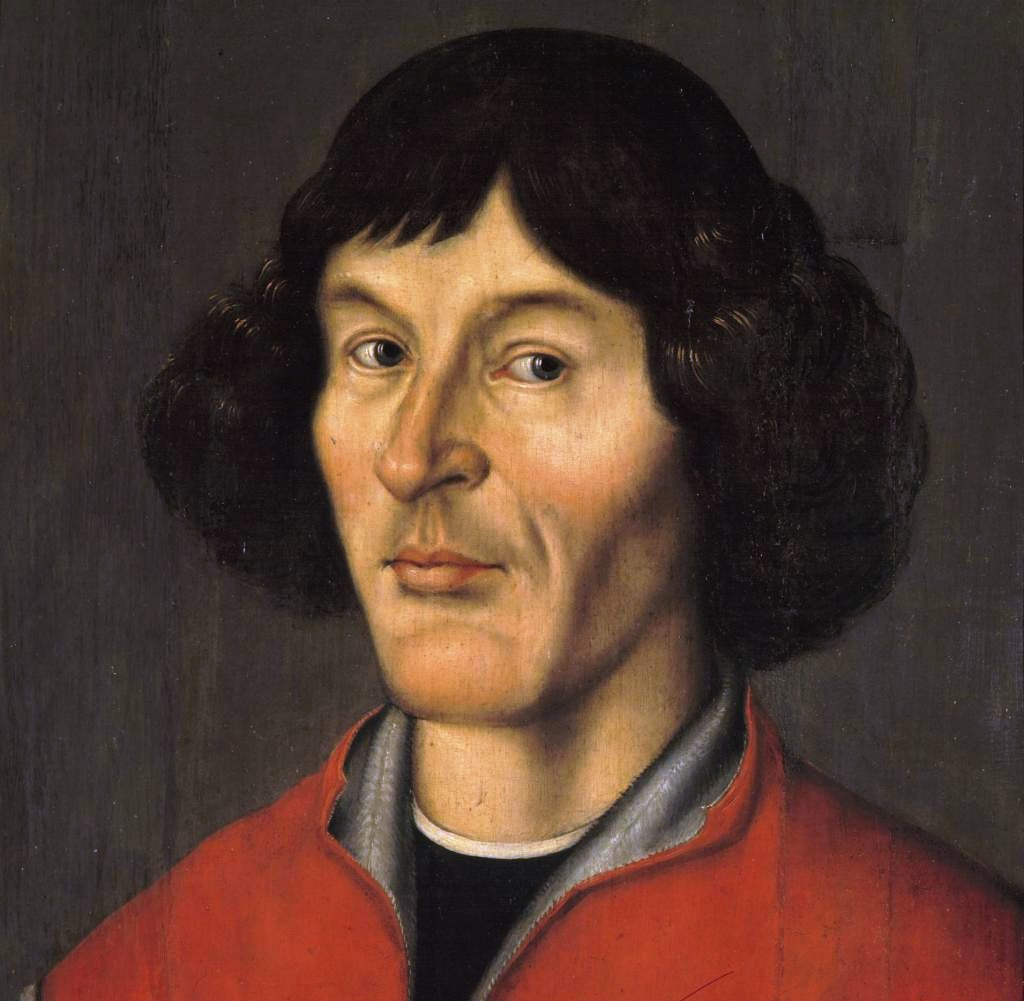
Nicolaus Copernicus, Renaissance polymath who formulated the theory of Heliocentrism

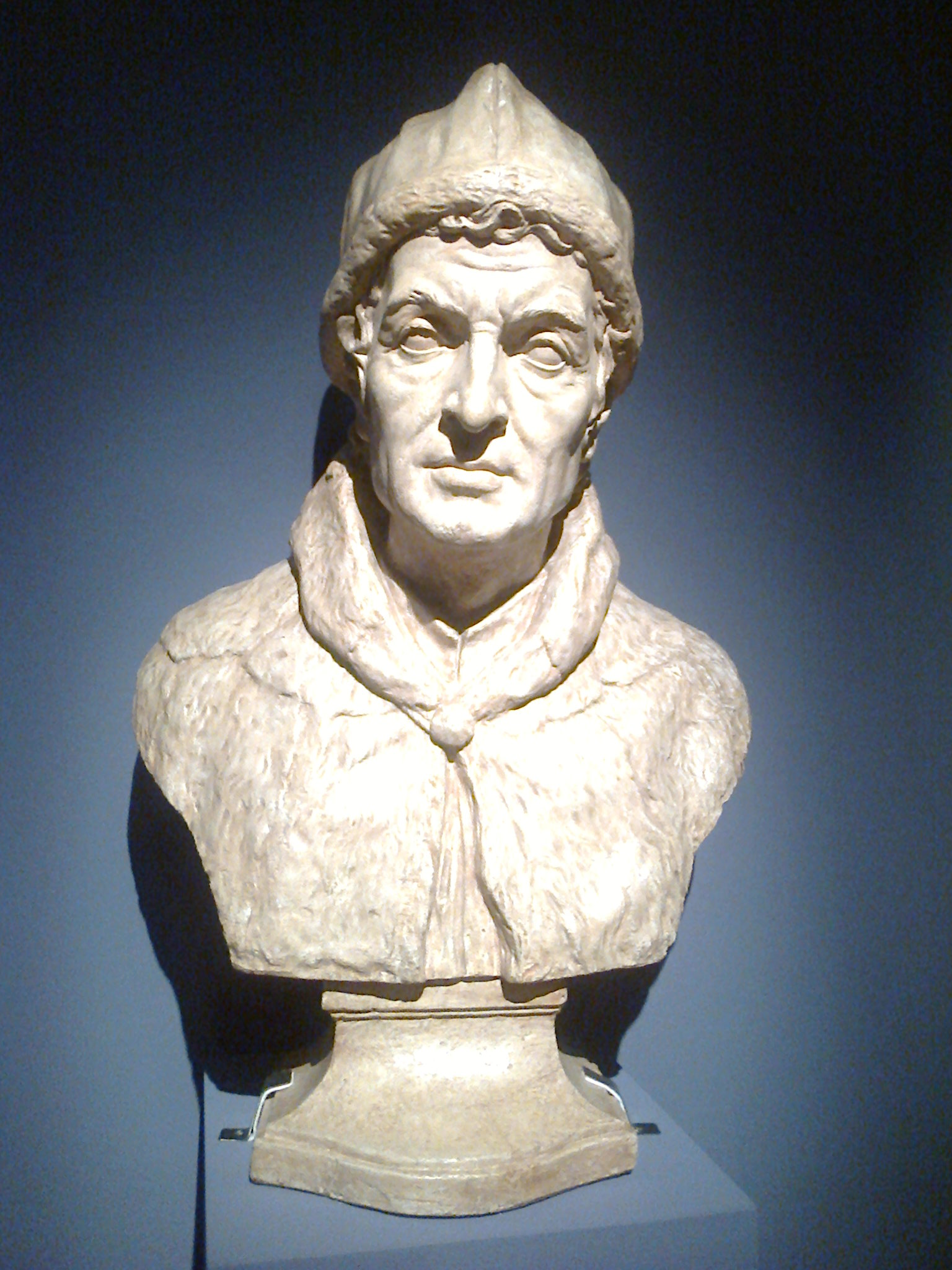
Jan Długosz, priest, chronicler and diplomat

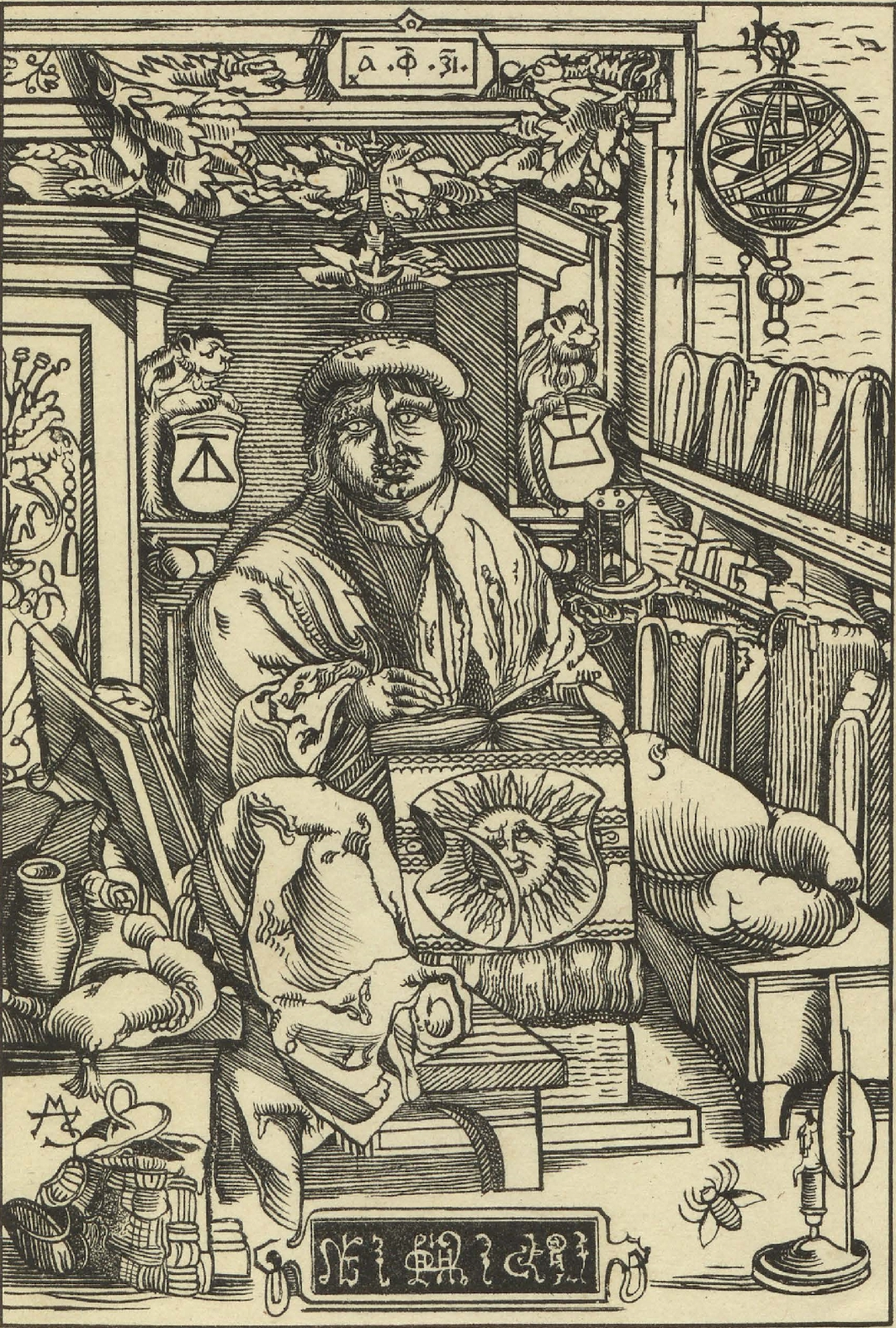
Francysk Skaryna, Belarusian humanist, physician, and translator

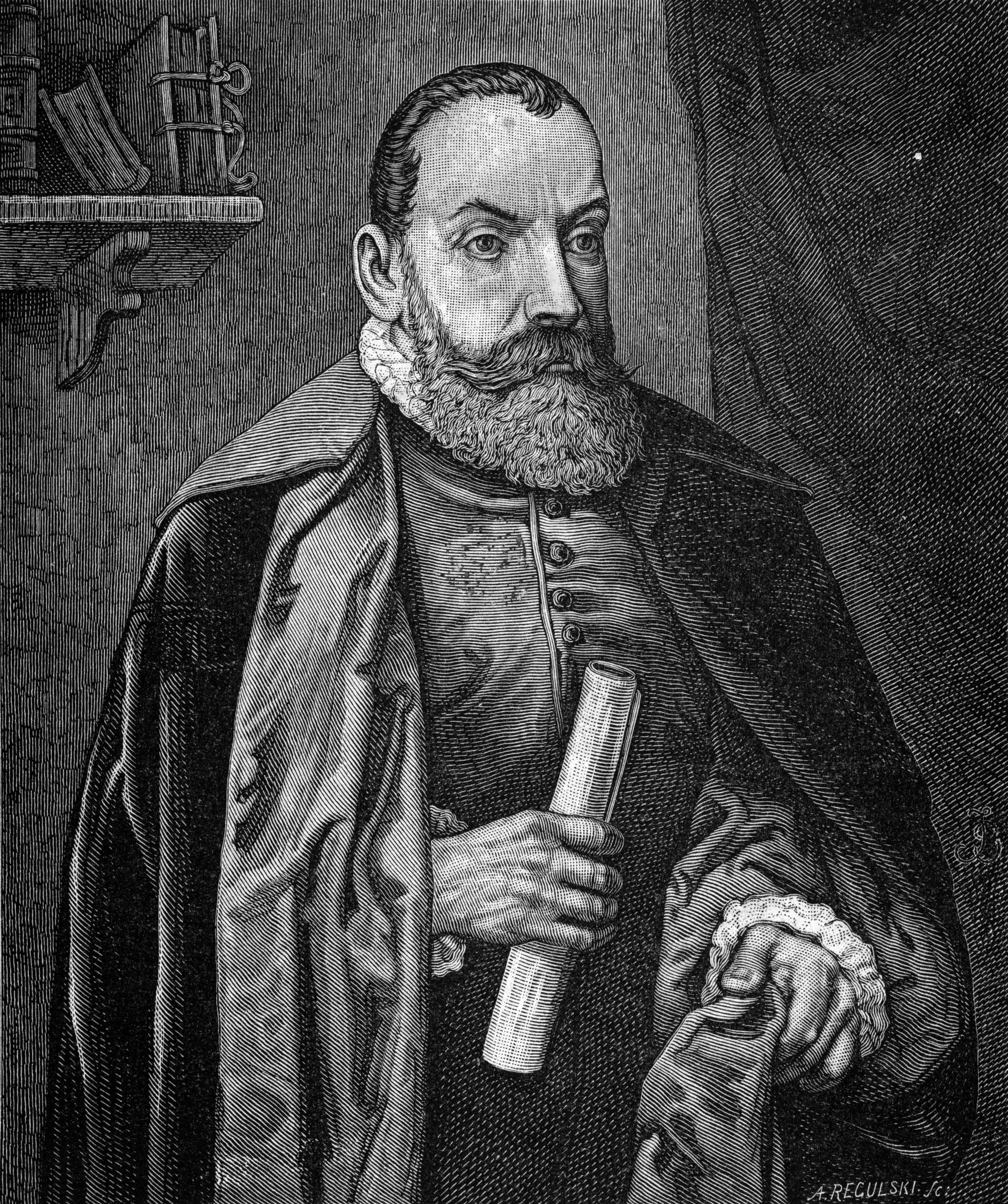
Jan Kochanowski, Renaissance poet who established poetic patterns that would become integral to the Polish literary language

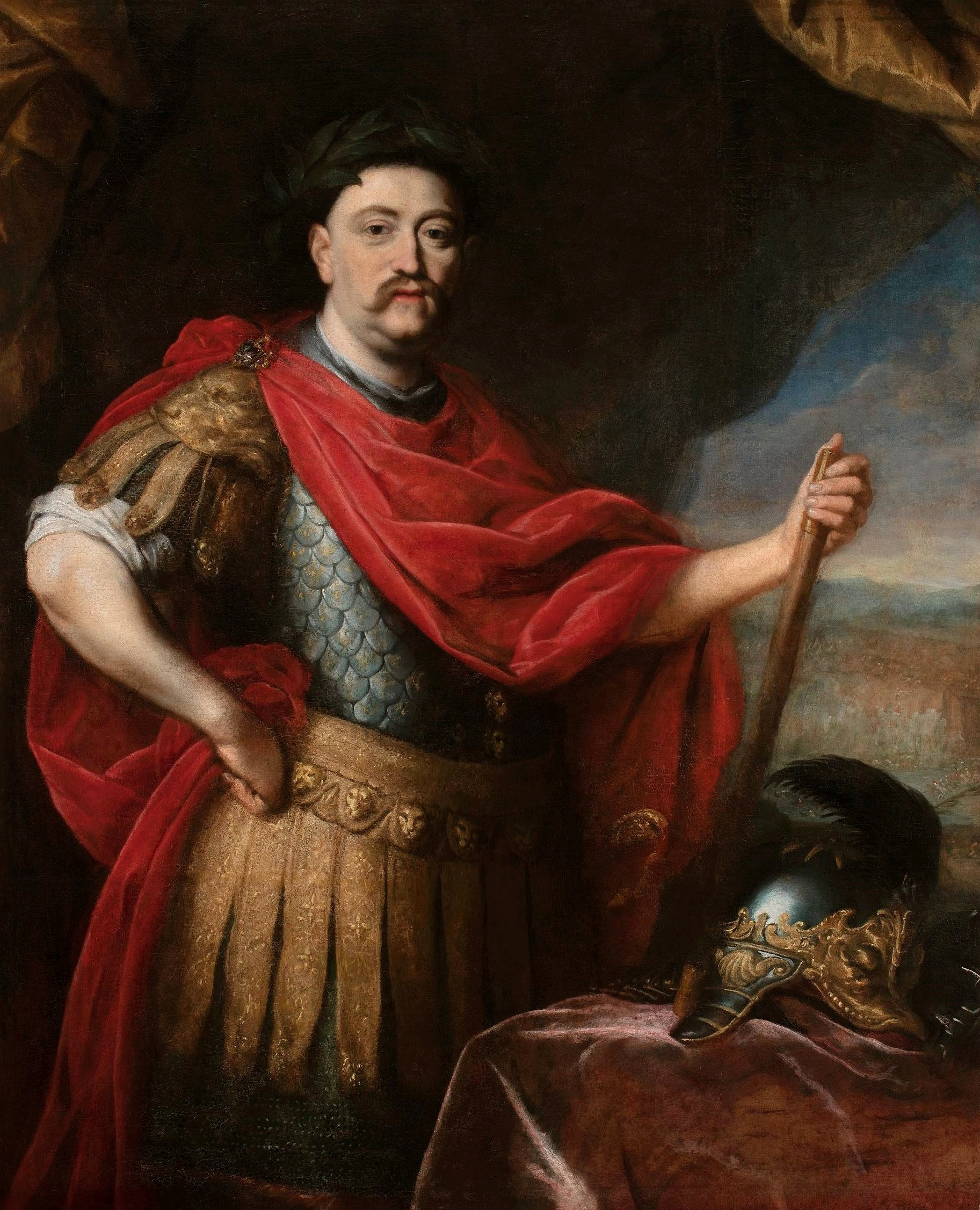
John III Sobieski, King of Poland

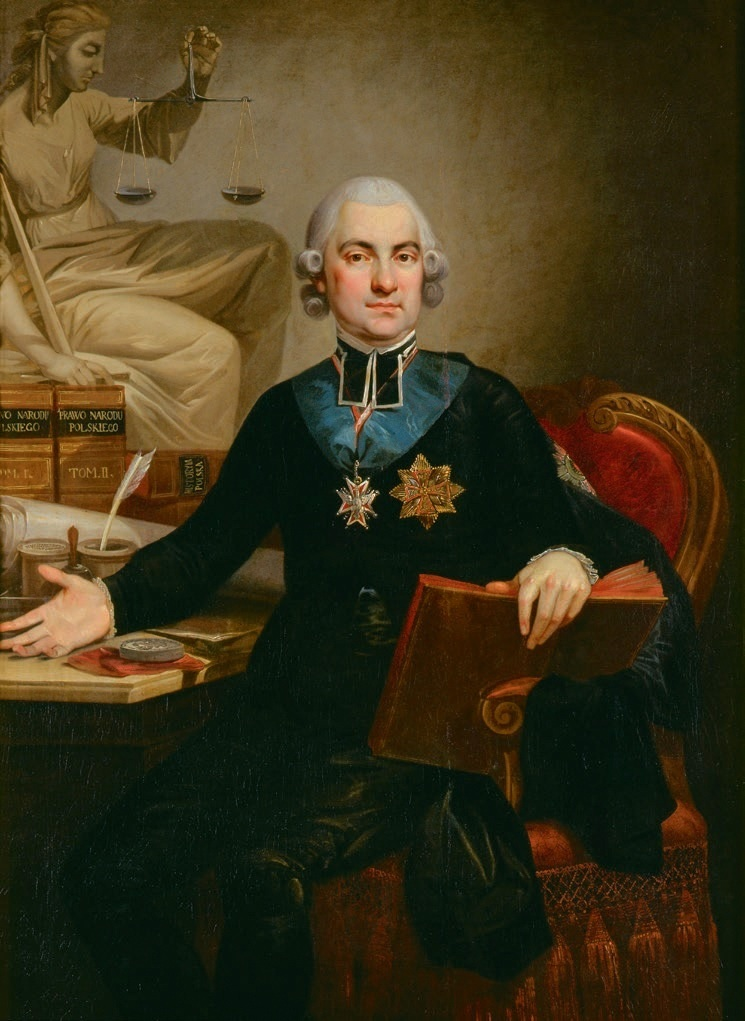
Hugo Kołłątaj, constitutional reformer and educationalist, one of the most prominent figures of the Polish Enlightenment

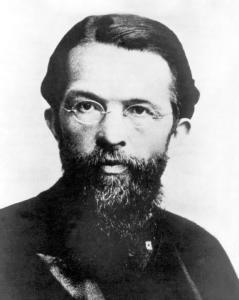
Carl Menger, Austrian economist and the founder of the Austrian School of economics

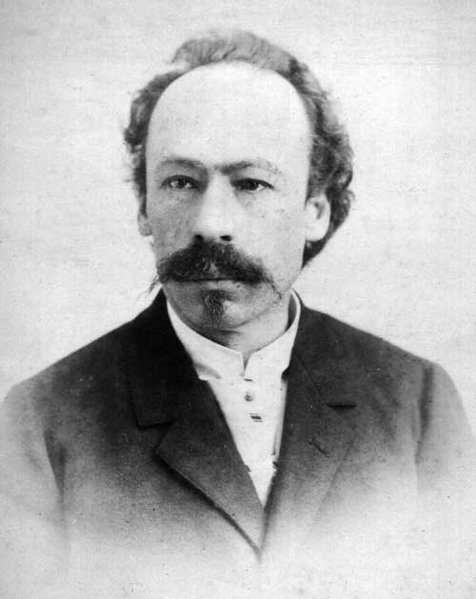
Karol Olszewski, chemist who became the first scientist to liquefy oxygen and nitrogen

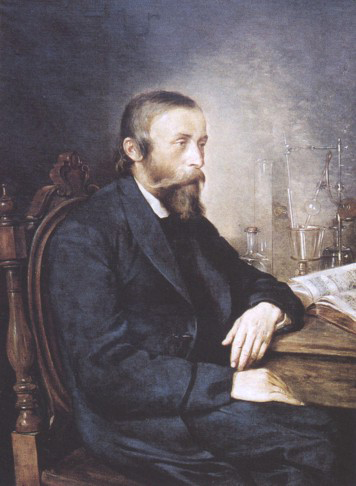
Ignacy Łukasiewicz, pharmacist, engineer, businessman, inventor, and philanthropist who built the world's first modern oil refinery

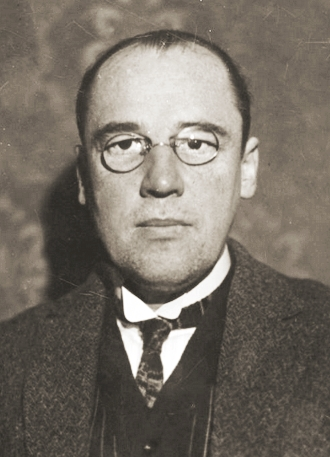
Wacław Sierpiński, mathematician known for contributions to set theory, number theory, theory of functions, and topology

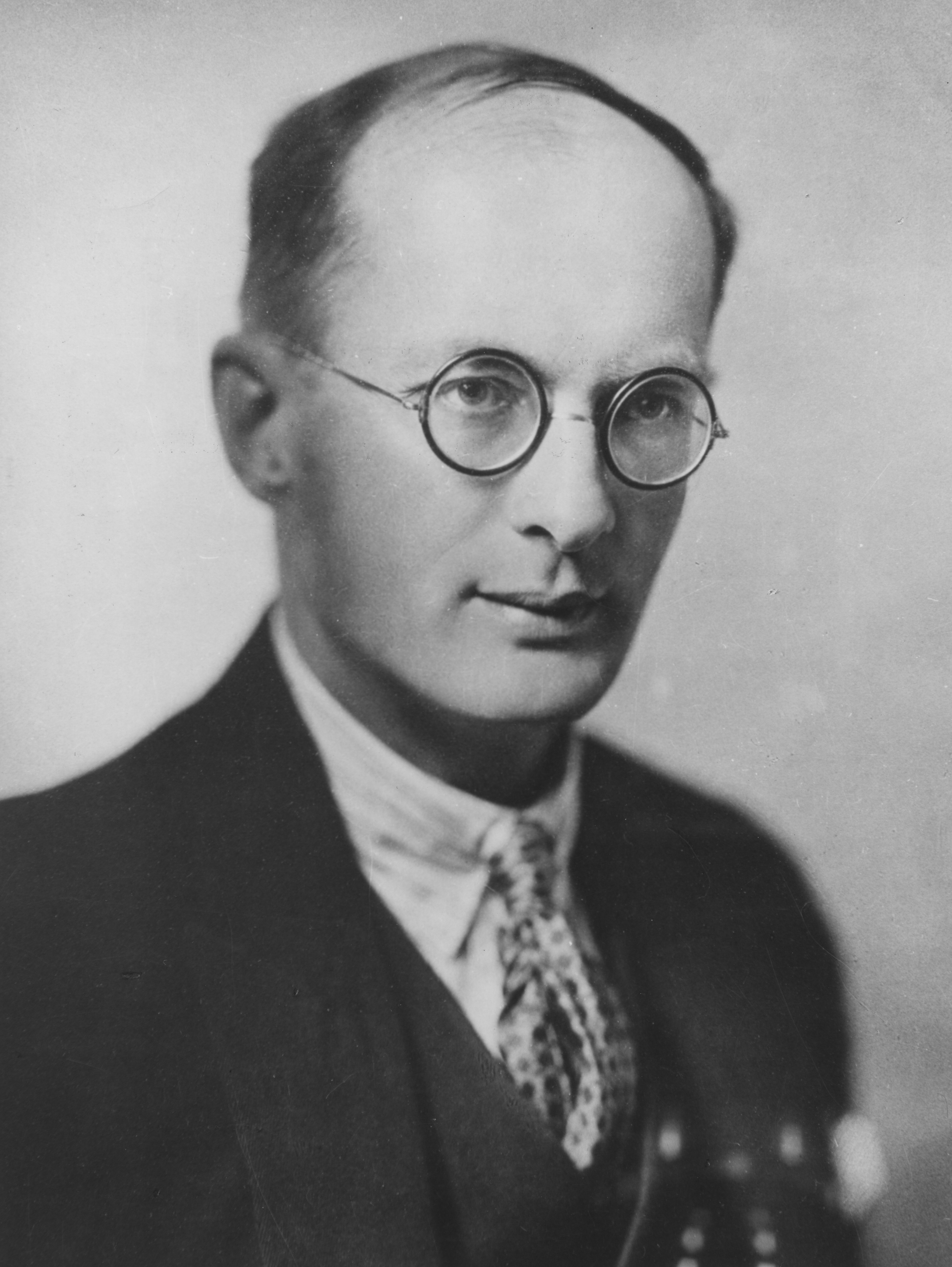
Bronisław Malinowski, one of the founders of social anthropology

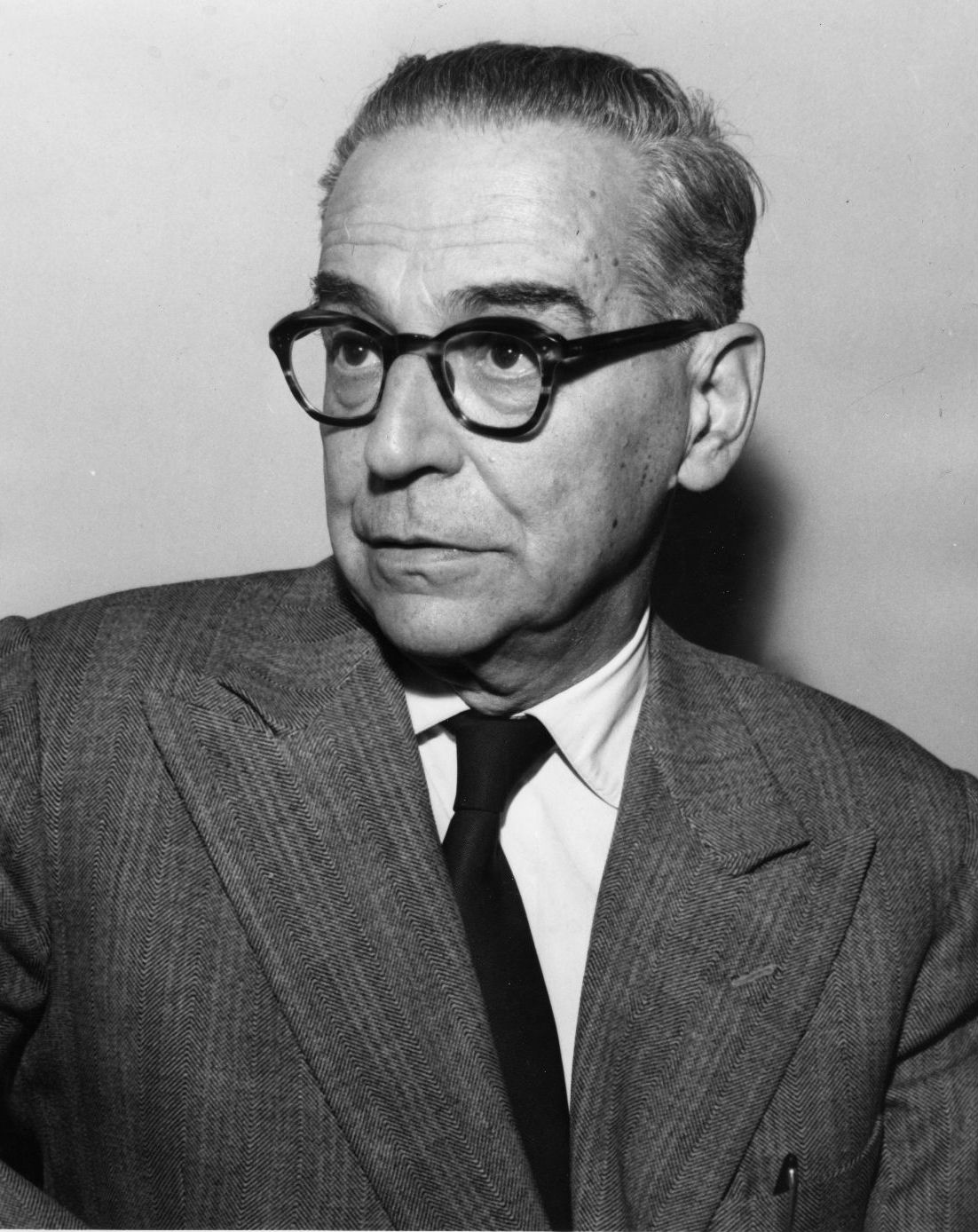
Ivo Andrić, Yugoslav novelist, poet and short story writer, winner of the 1961 Nobel Prize in Literature

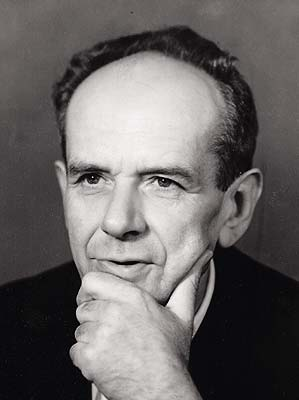
Antoni Kępiński, psychiatrist and philosopher

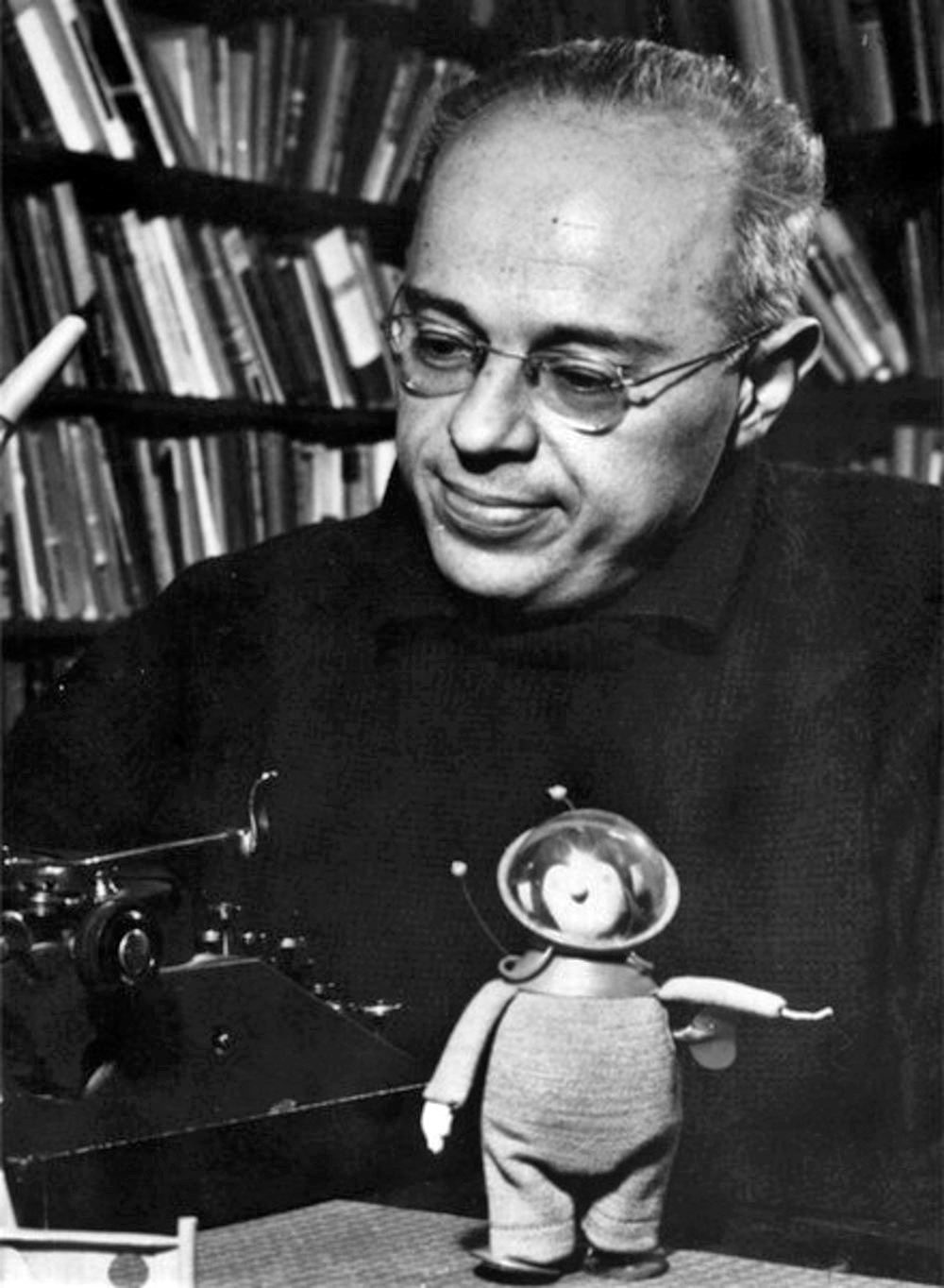
Stanisław Lem, writer of science fiction and essays on various subjects, including philosophy, futurology, and literary criticism

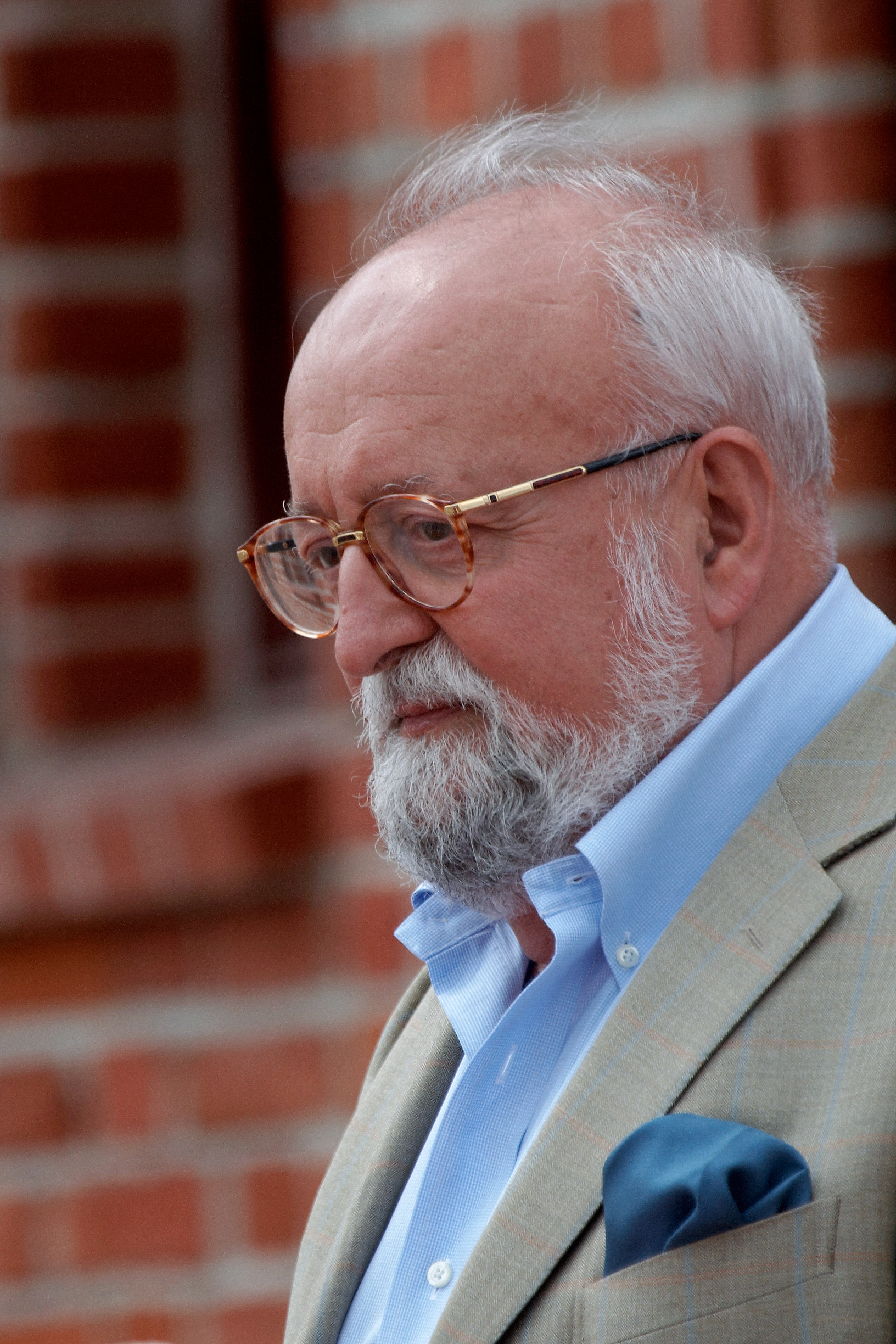
Krzysztof Penderecki, composer and conductor

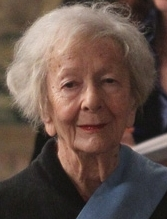
Wisława Szymborska, poet, essayist and translator, recipient of the 1996 Nobel Prize in Literature

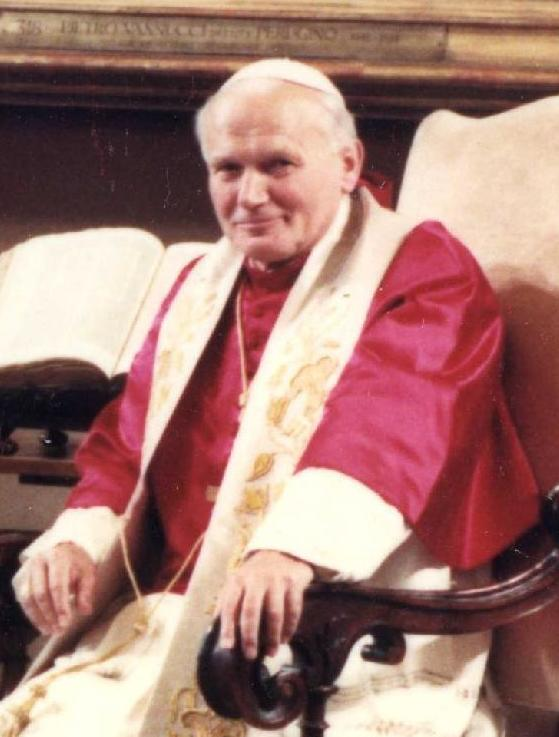
Pope John Paul II, head of the Catholic Church from 1978 until 2005

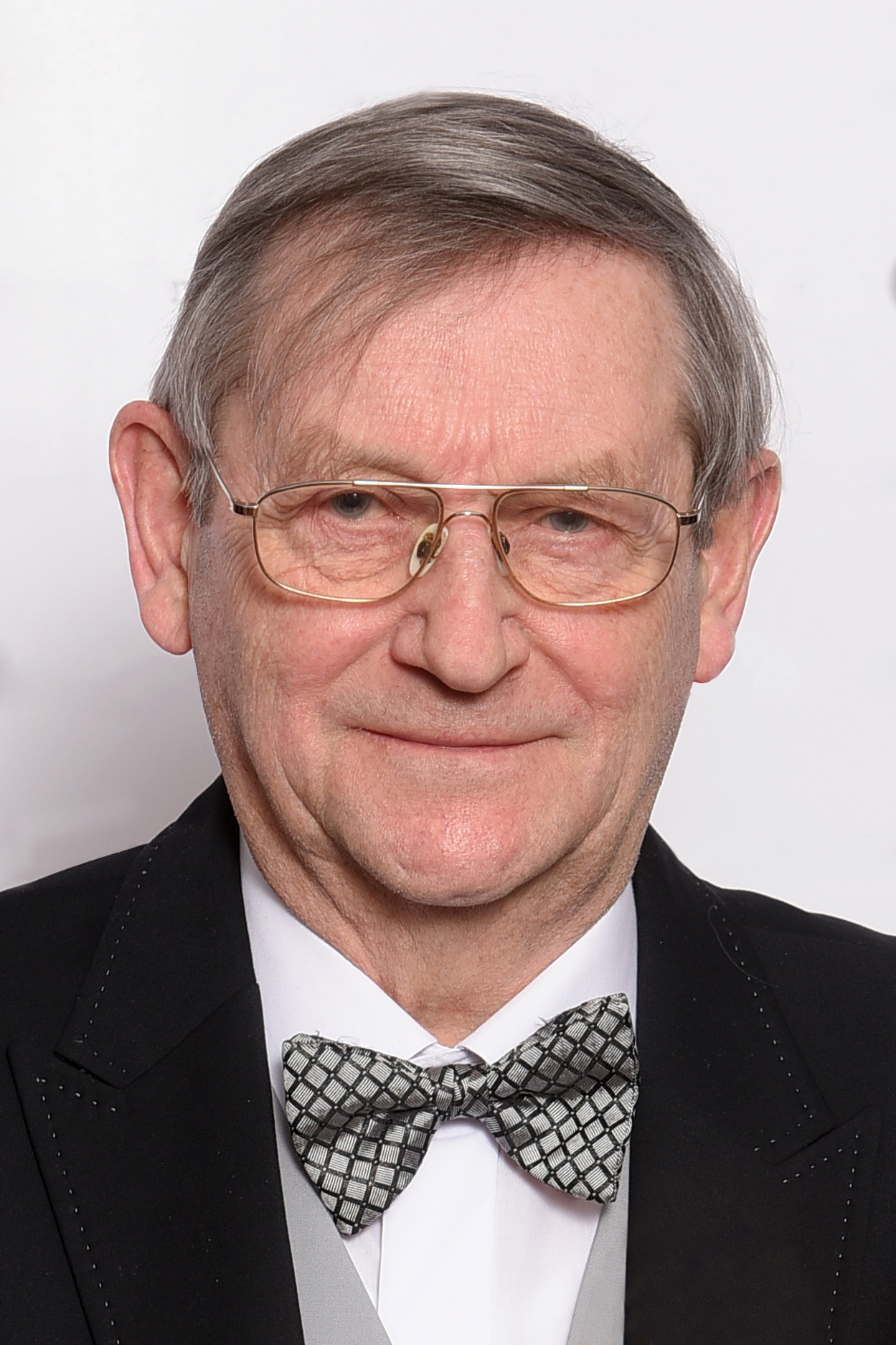
Norman Davies, British historian specializing in Central and Eastern Europe

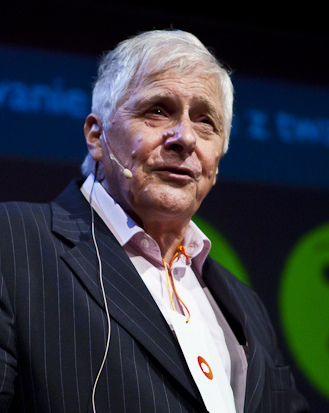
Jerzy Vetulani, neuroscientist, pharmacologist and biochemist

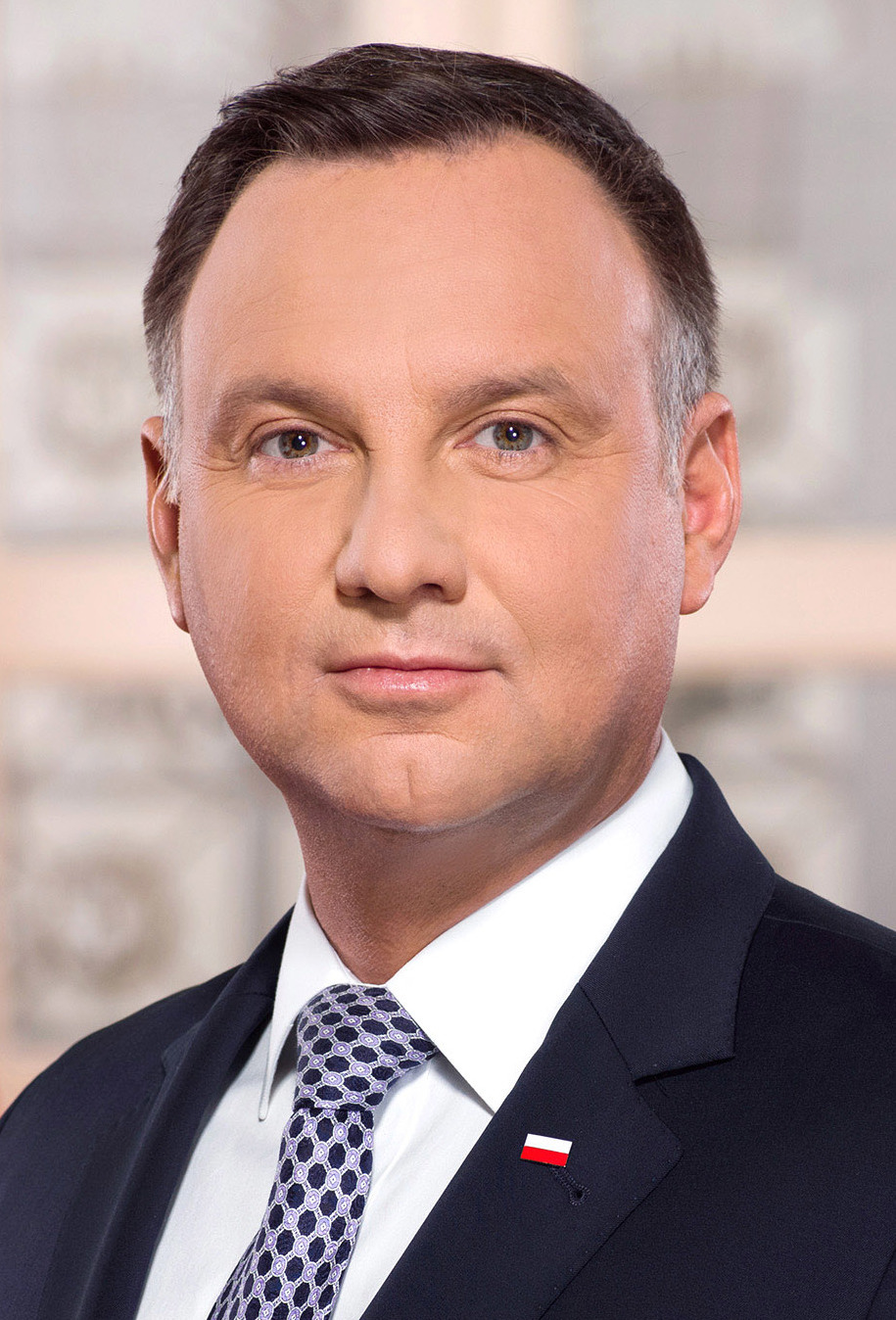
Andrzej Duda, 6th President of the Republic of Poland

== Notable faculty ==
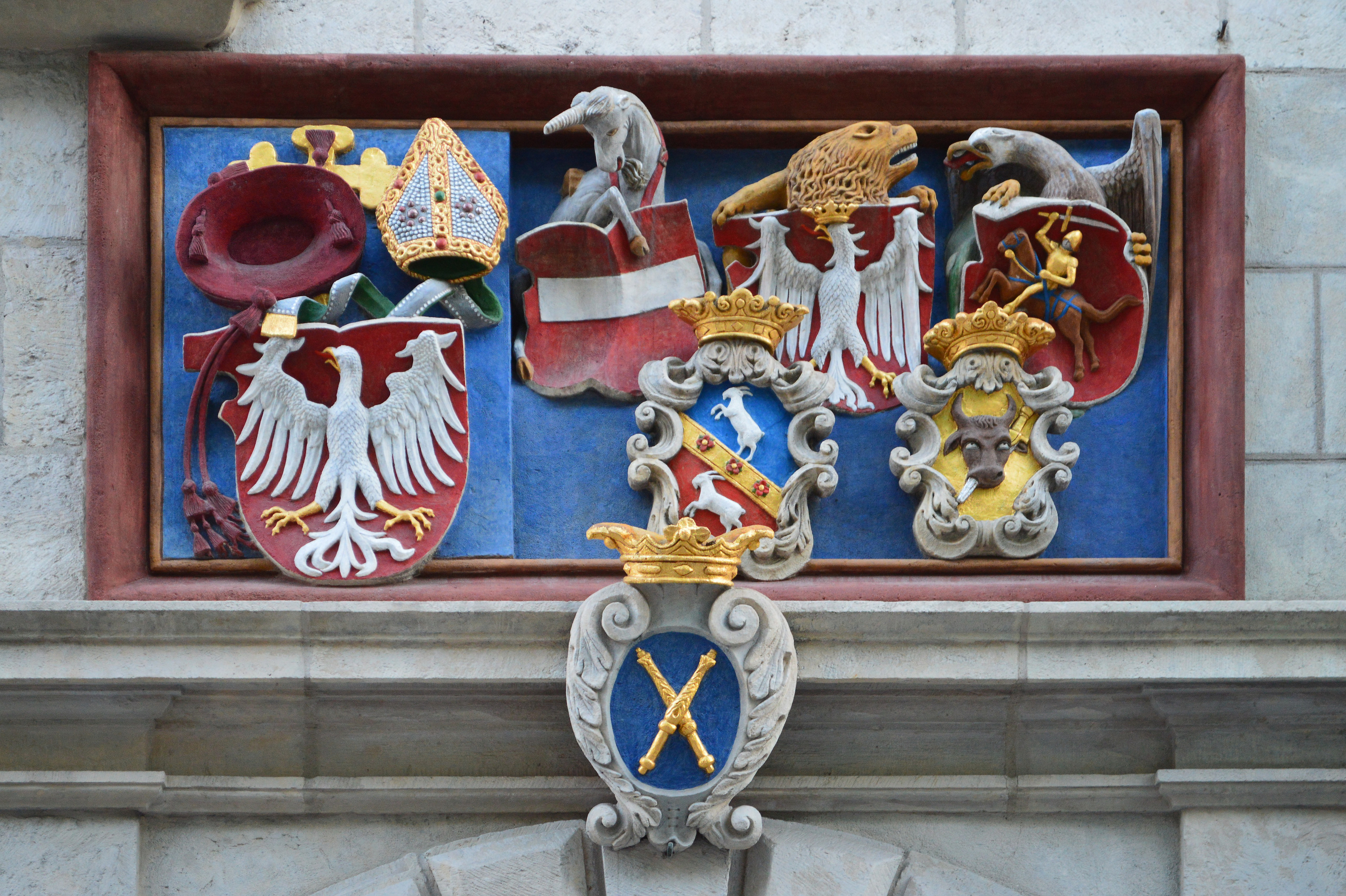
Heraldic frieze on the building of Collegium Maius depicting coats of arms of the Kraków bishops, chancellors, cardinals, as well as Elizabeth of Austria, Crown of the Kingdom of Poland, Grand Duchy of Lithuania, and the Kraków Academy

- Stanisław of Skarbimierz (1360–1431), rector, theologian, lawyer
- Paweł Włodkowic (1370–1435), lawyer, diplomat and politician, representative of Poland at the Council of Constance
- Albert Brudzewski (1445–1497), astronomer and mathematician
- Maciej Miechowita (1457–1523), historian, chronicler, geographer, medic
- Marcin Szlachciński (1511/1512–1600), scholar, translator, poet and philosopher
- Jan Brożek (1585–1652), mathematician, physician and astronomer
- Adam Bełcikowski (1839–1909), philosopher, historian of literature, poet
- Franz Mertens (1840–1927), mathematician
- Henryk Jordan (1842–1907), professor of obstetrics
- Walery Jaworski (1849–1924), gastroenterologist
- Ludwik Rydygier (1850–1920), general surgeon
- Albert Wojciech Adamkiewicz (1850–1921), pathologist, discovered the Artery of Adamkiewicz and the Adamkiewicz reaction
- Jan Śleszyński (1854–1931), mathematician
- Napoleon Cybulski (1854–1919), pioneer in endocrinology
- Edmund Załęski (1863–1932), agrotechnician and chemist
- Władysław Natanson (1864–1937), physicist
- Stanisław Estreicher (1869–1939), founder of the Jagiellonian University Museum
- Tadeusz Estreicher (1871–1952), pioneer in cryogenics
- Marian Smoluchowski (1872–1917), pioneer of statistical physics
- Bohdan Lepky (1872–1941), literature
- Franciszek Bujak (1875–1953), historian
- Stanisław Kutrzeba (1876–1946), rector, General Secretary of the Polish Academy of Learning
- Andrzej Gawroński (1885–1927), founder of the Polish Oriental Society, master of Sanskrit
- Stanisław Kot (1885–1975), historian and politician
- Jan Zawidzki (1886–1928), chemist and historian
- Tadeusz Sulimirski (1898–1983), historian and archaeologist, experts on the ancient Sarmatians
- Roman Grodecki (1889–1964), economic historian
- Stanisław Smreczyński (1899–1975), zoologist
- Henryk Niewodniczański (1900–1968), physicist
- Adam Vetulani (1901–1976), historian of medieval and canon law
- Maria Ludwika Bernhard (1908–1998), archaeologist
- Wisława Szymborska (1923–2012), poet, recipient of the 1996 Nobel Prize in Literature
- Bogdan Baranowski (1927–2014), chemist
- Zygmunt Szweykowski (1929–2023), musicologist
- Ryszard Gryglewski (1932–2023), pharmacologist and physician, a discoverer of prostacyclin
- Andrzej Szczeklik (1932–2012), physician
- Jan Woleński (born 1940), philosopher
- Piotr Sztompka (born 1944), sociologist
- Jan Potempa (born 1955), biologist, recipient of the 2011 Prize of the Foundation for Polish Science
- Sławomir Kołodziej (born 1961), mathematician
- Krzysztof Kościelniak (born 1965), historian

== Student associations ==
In 1851, the university's first student scientific association was founded. In 2021, over 70 student scientific associations exist at the Jagiellonian University, most of them affiliated with Collegium Medicum. Usually, their purpose is to promote students' scientific achievements by organizing lecture sessions, science excursions, and international student conferences, such as the International Workshop for Young Mathematicians, which is organized by the Zaremba Association of Mathematicians.

Selected locations around the city
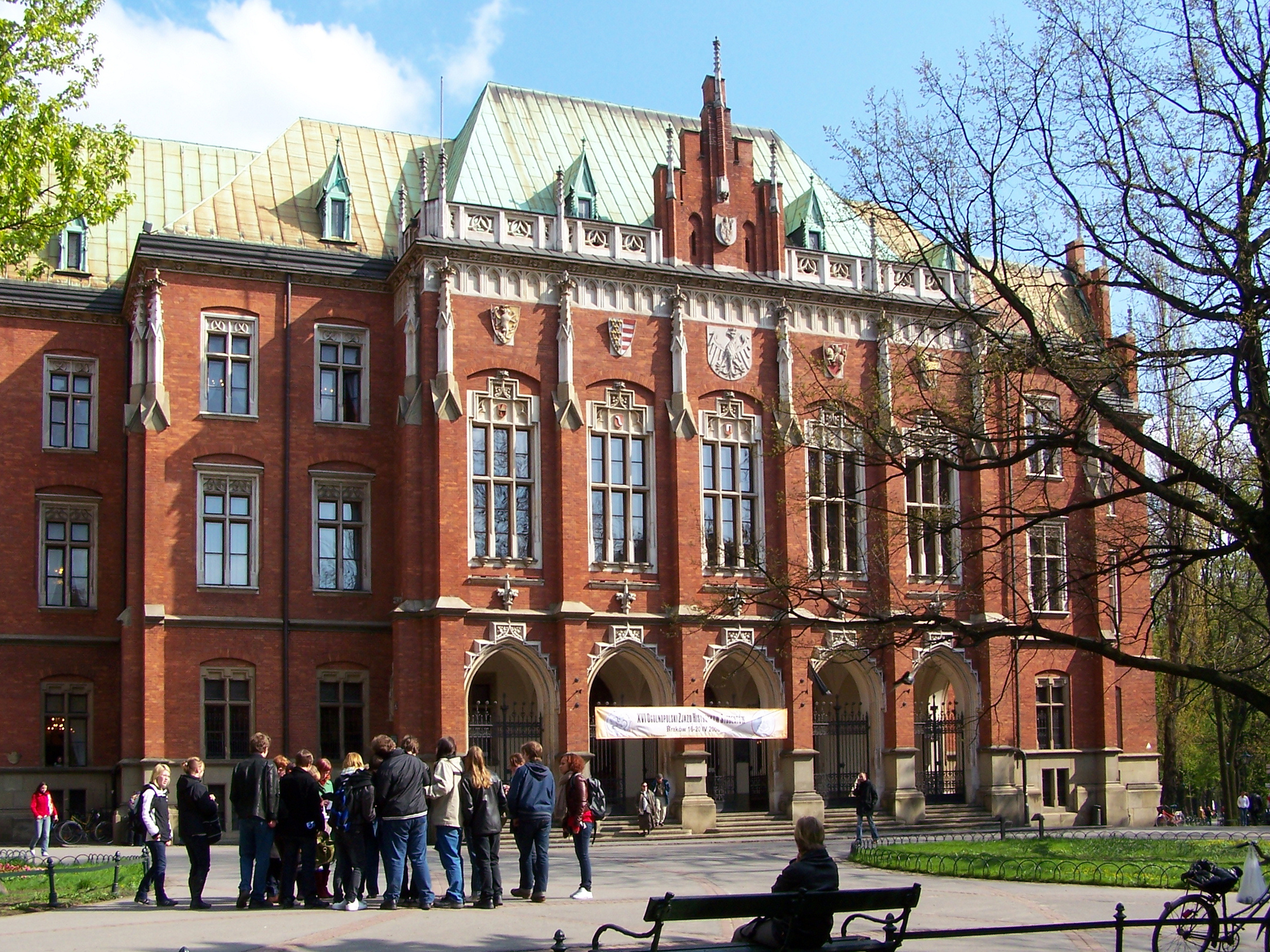
Collegium Novum

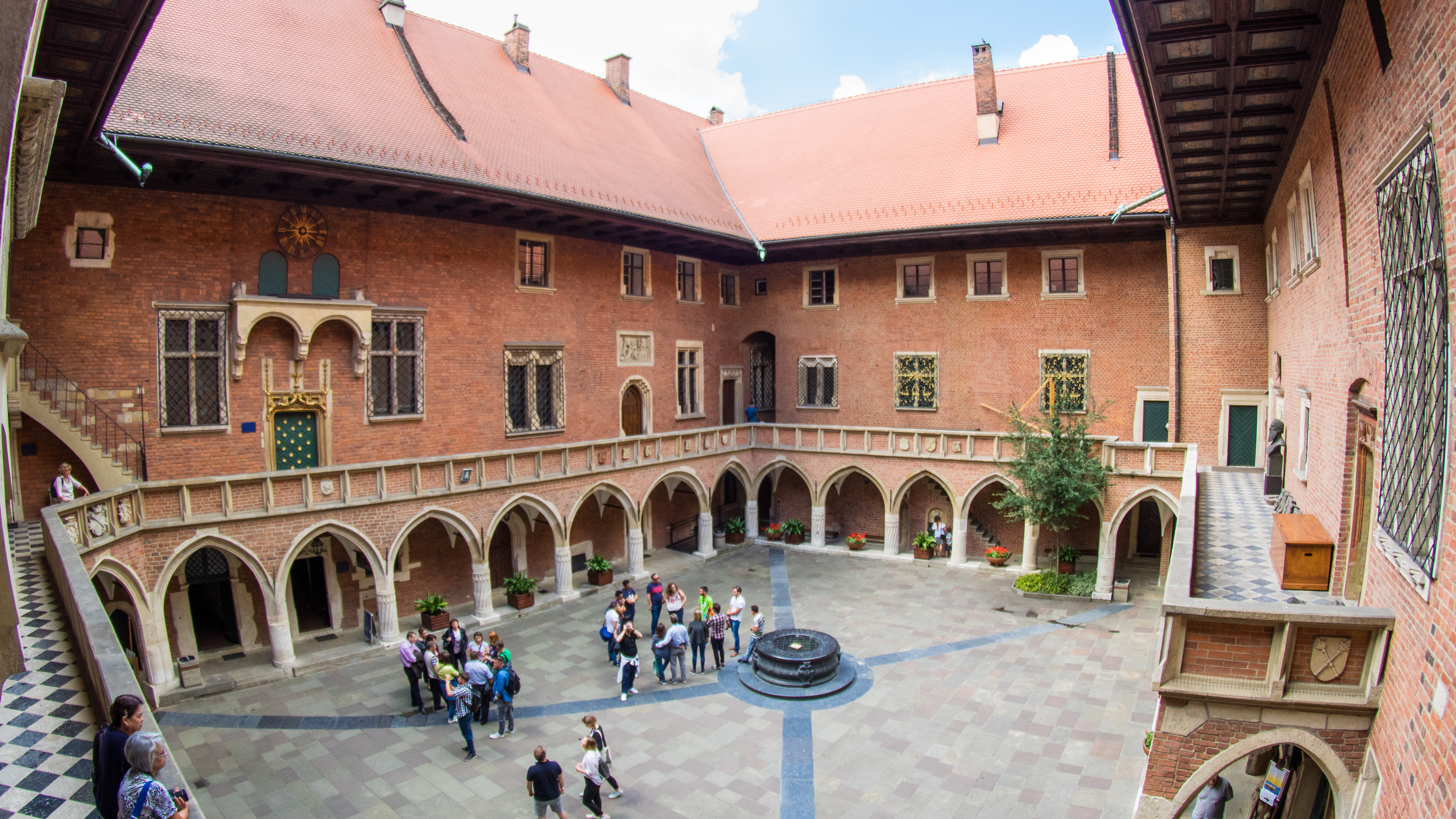
Collegium Maius, the oldest building of the university

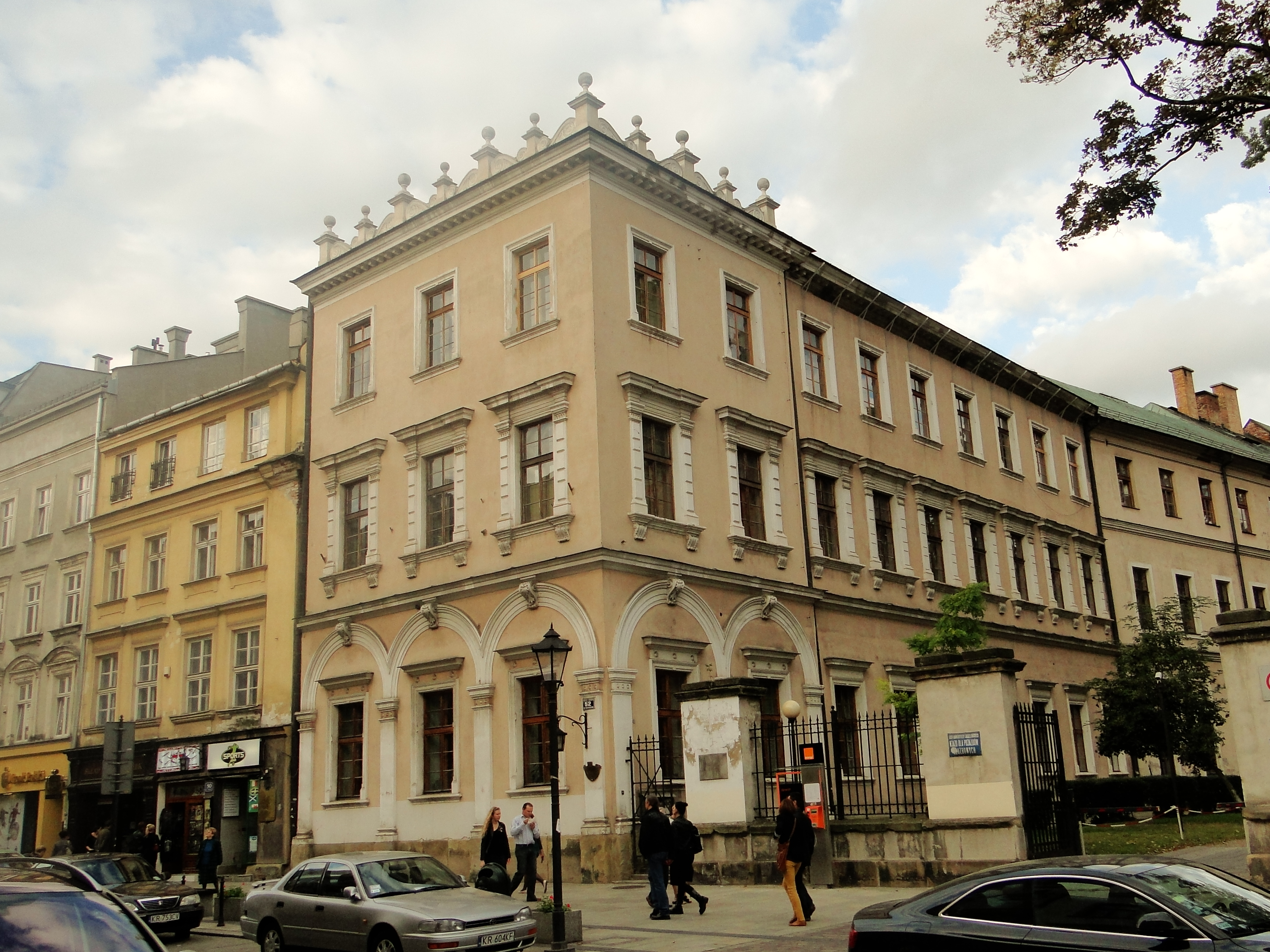
Collegium Broscianum on Grodzka Street

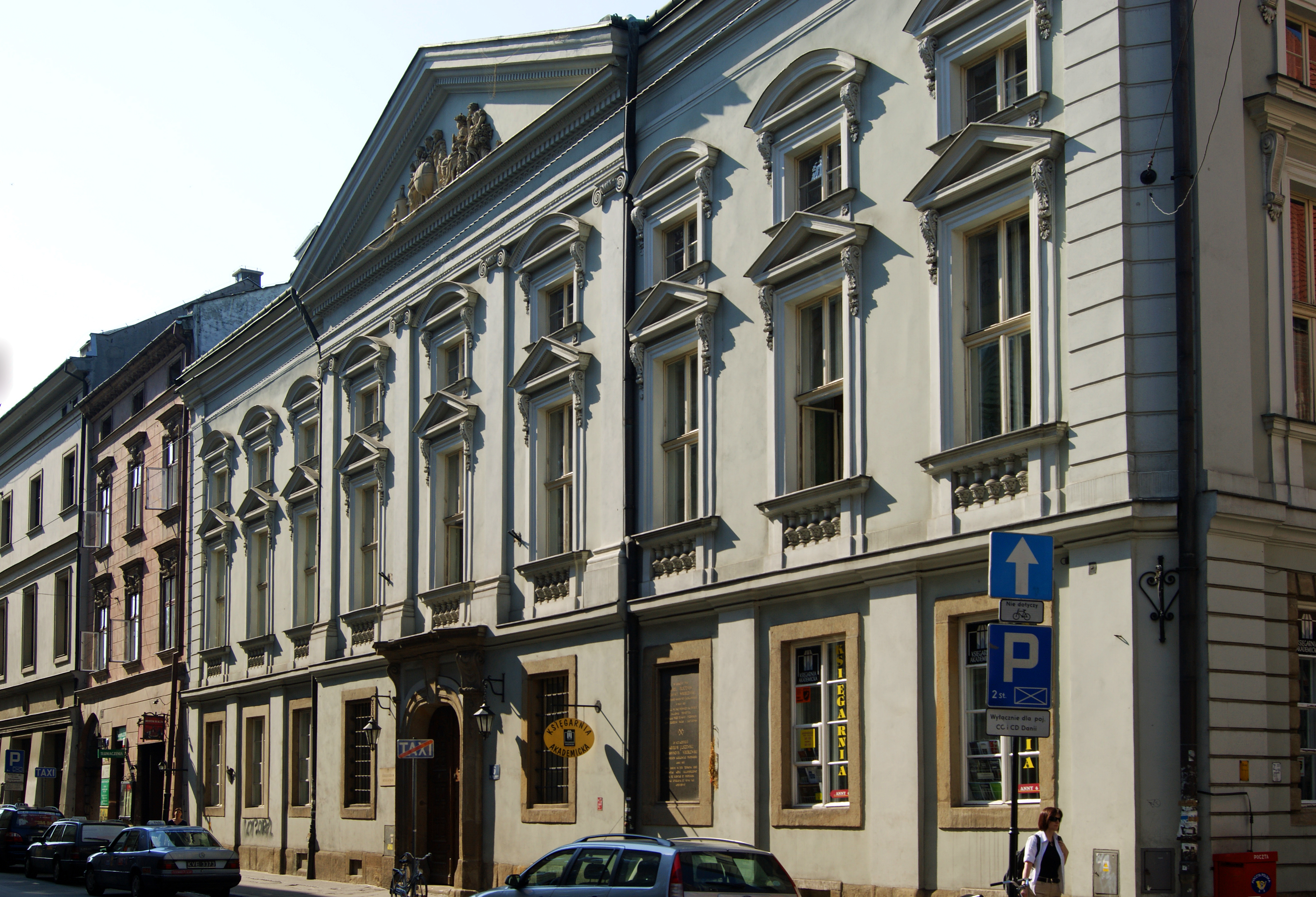
Collegium Physicum

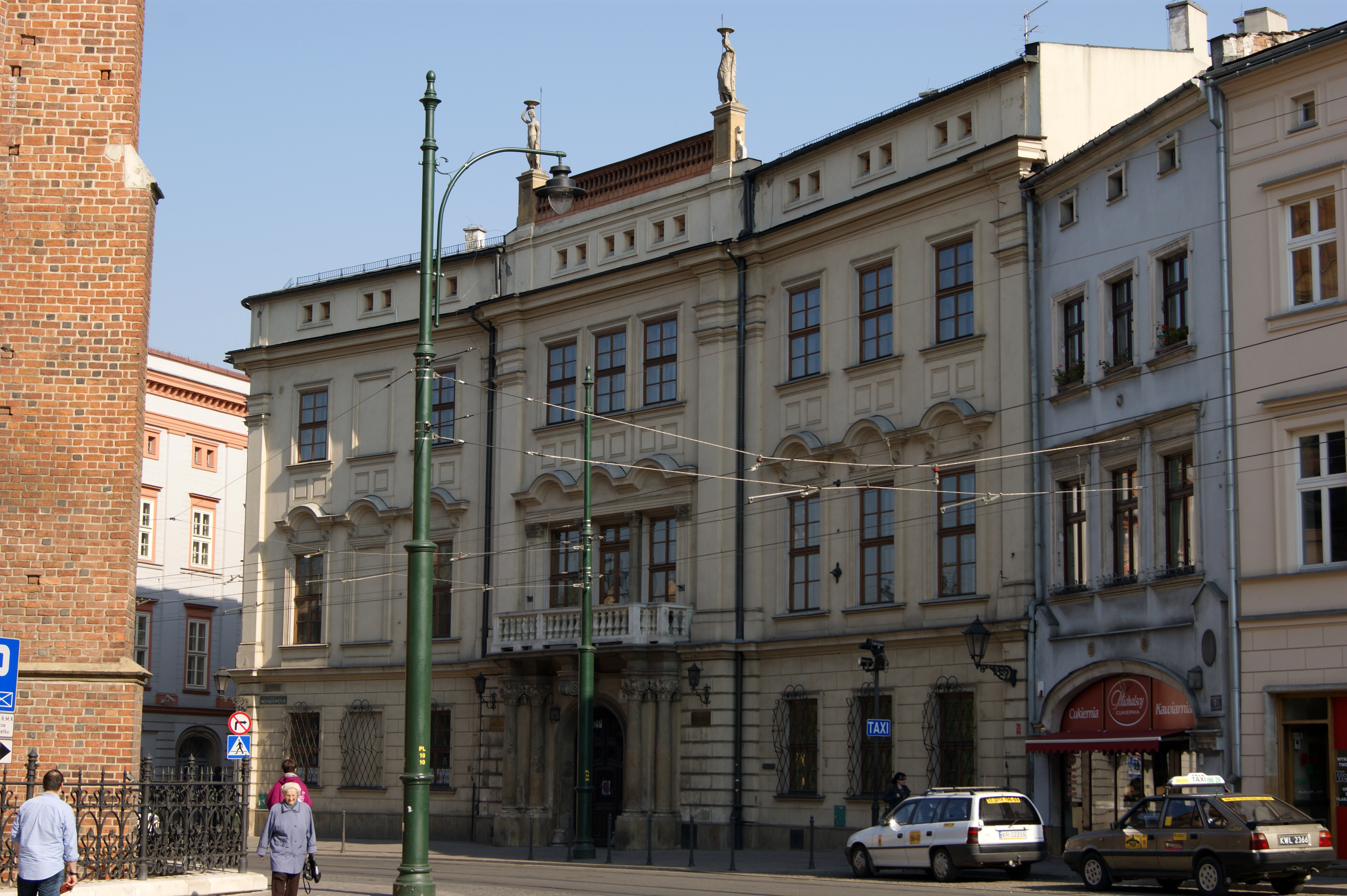
Larysz Palace, Faculty of Law and Administration

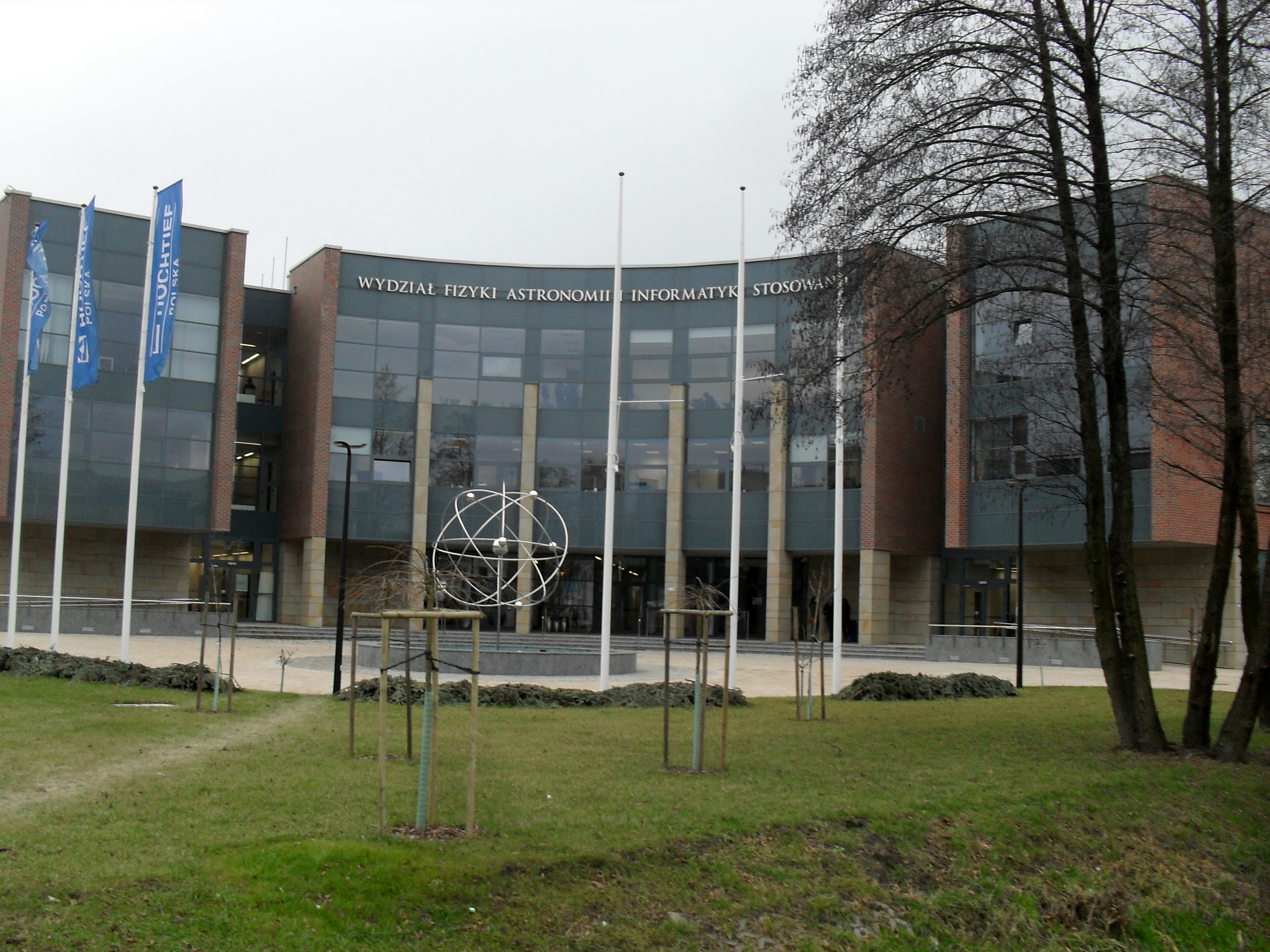
Faculty of Physics, Astronomy and Applied Computer Science

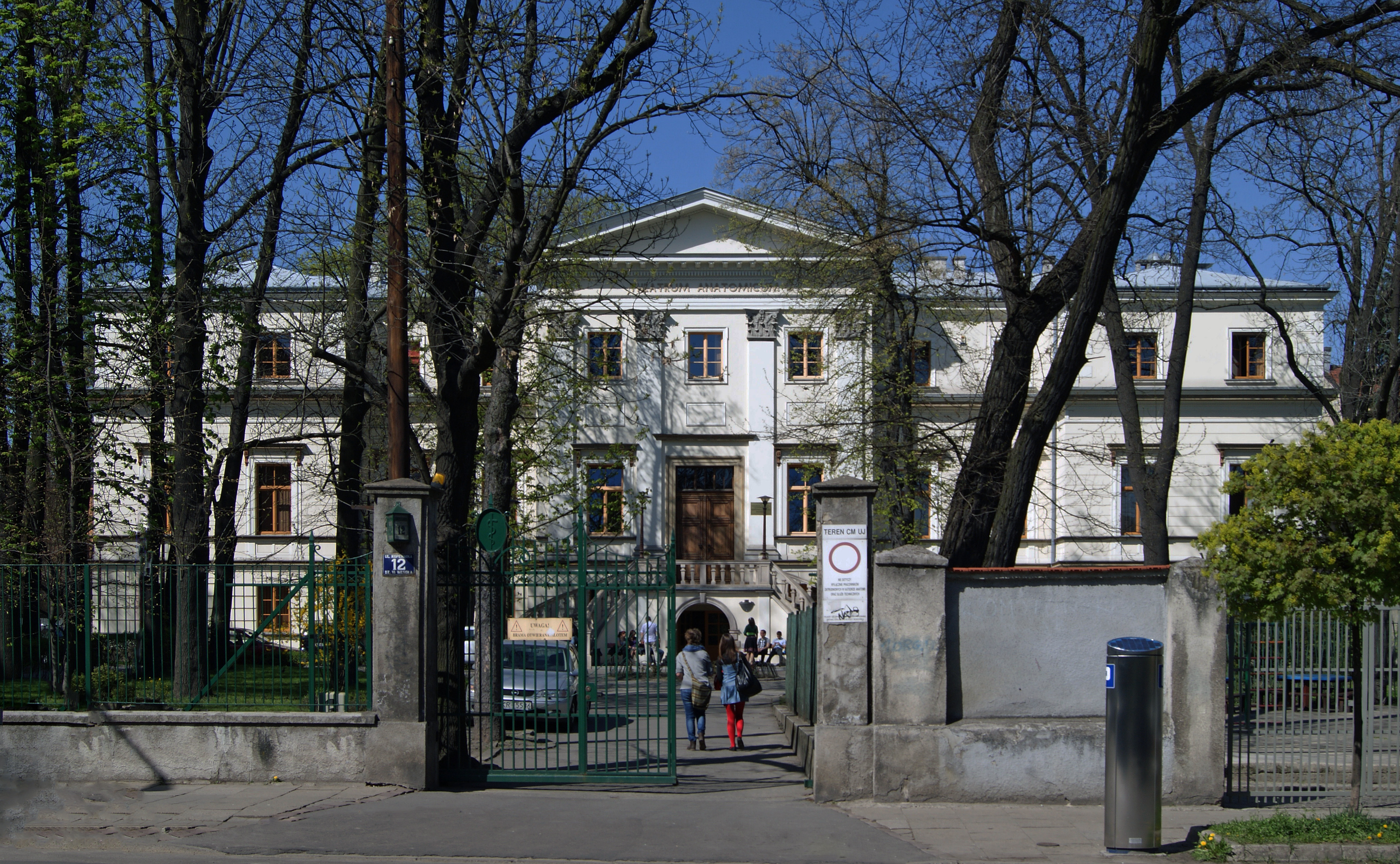
Theatrum Anatomicum of the Faculty of Medicine

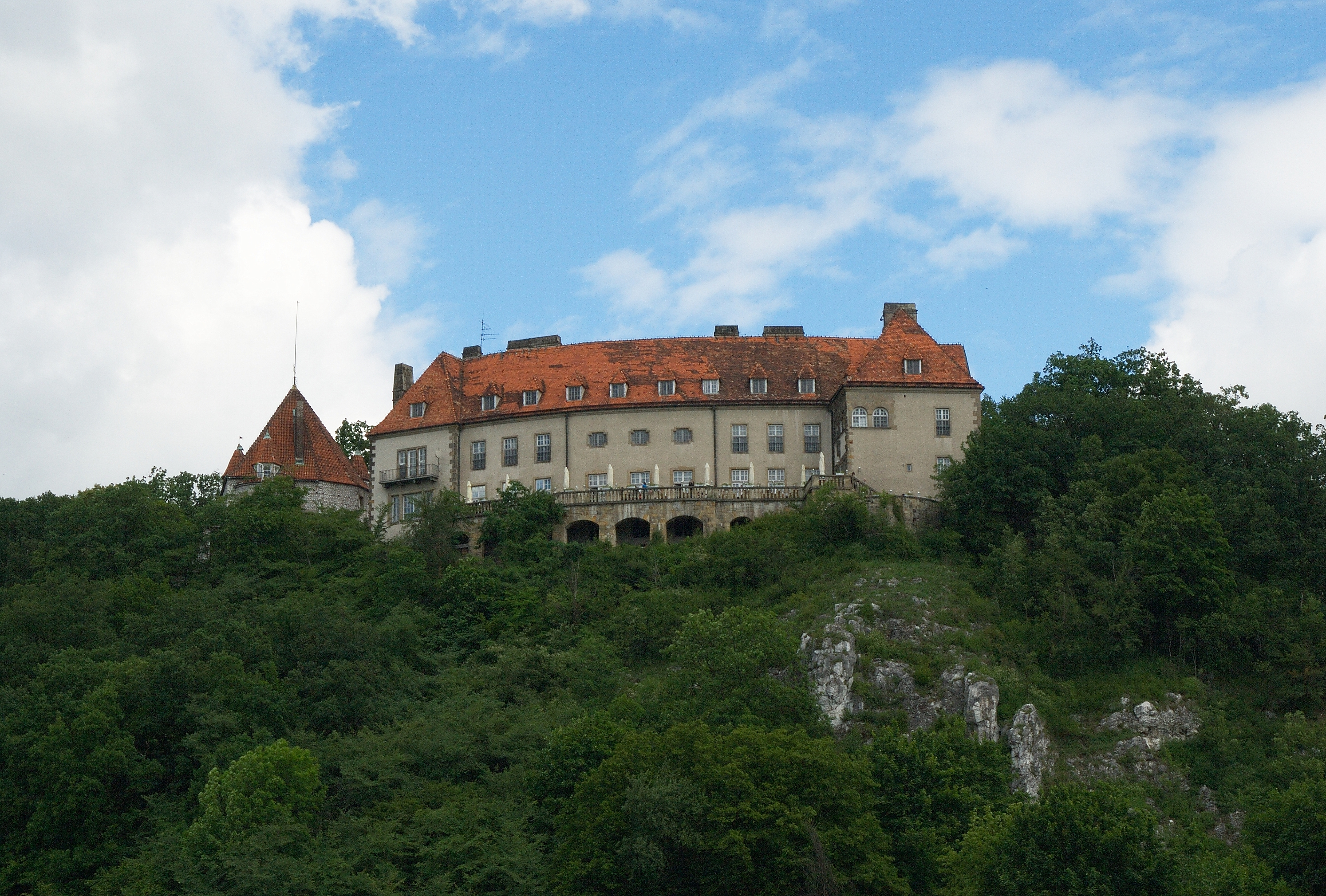
Przegorzały Castle, the seat of the Institute of European Studies

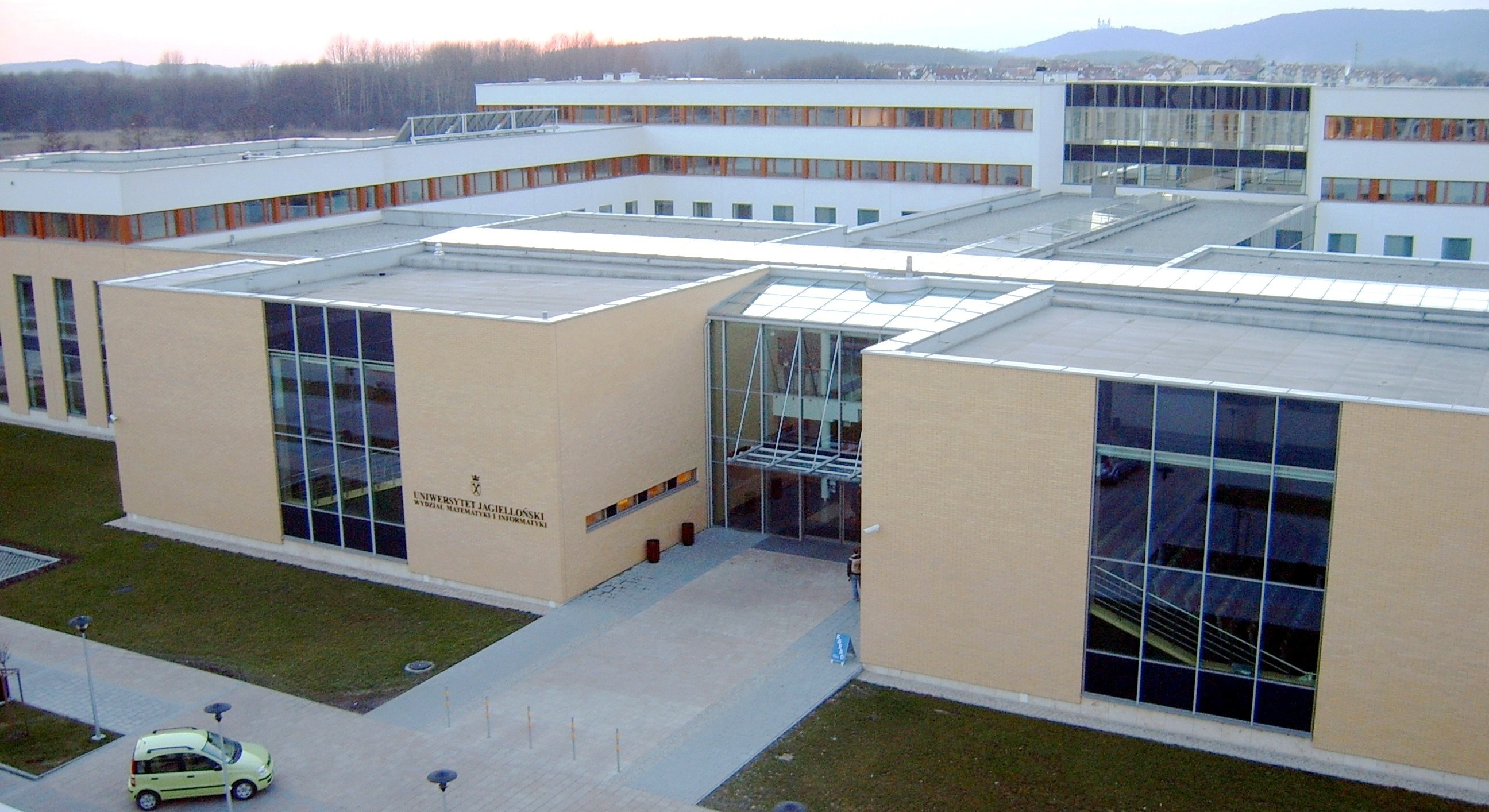
Campus of the 600th anniversary of University's Revival

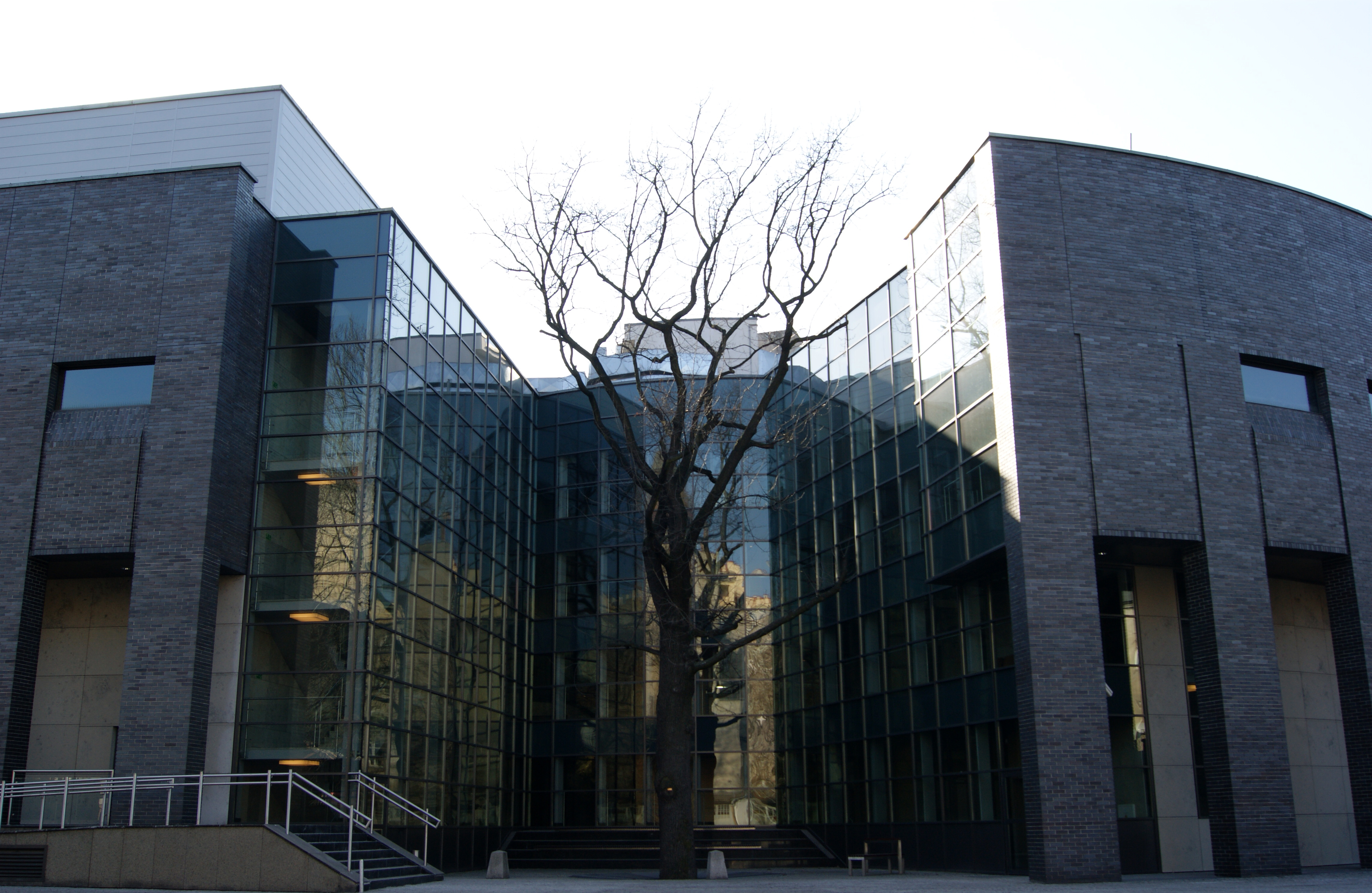
Auditorium Maximum with theatre stage seating 1,200

== See also ==
- List of medieval universities
- Nawojka, the university's legendary first female student from the 15th century
- Sonderaktion Krakau, a German operation against professors and academics from the University of Kraków
- Neuronus IBRO & IRUN Neuroscience Forum
