= Adam Bełcikowski =

Polish philosopher, historian of literature, poet and dramaturg

Adam Belcikowski
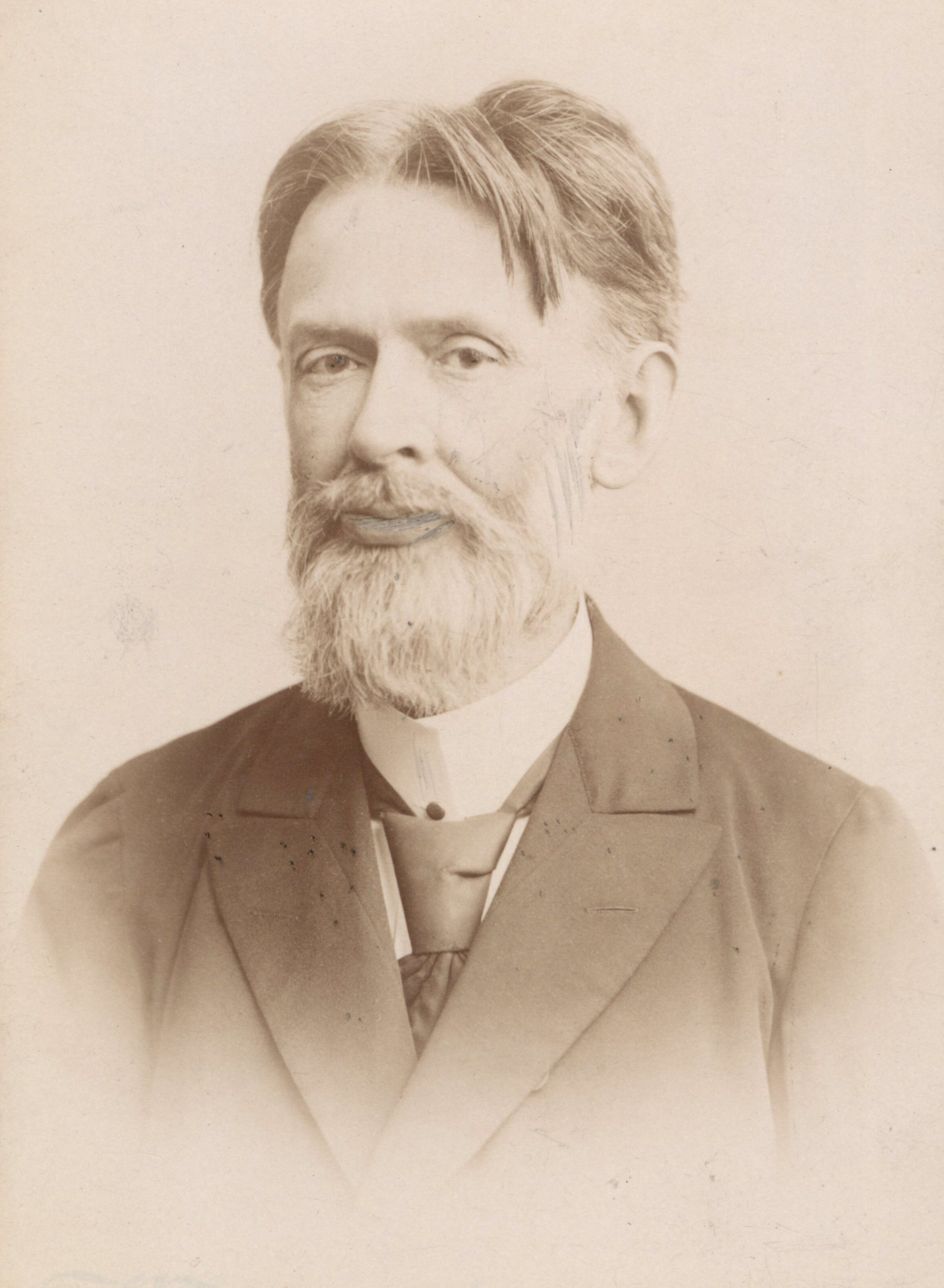
- Born: 24 December 1839; Free City of Kraków
- Died: 13 January 1909 (aged 69); Kraków, Austria-Hungary
- Occupations: Polish writer and academic

Adam Bełcikowski (Belcikowski) (24 December 1839 – 13 January 1909) was a Polish philosopher, historian of literature, poet and a dramaturg. He was born and died in Kraków.

== Education ==
Belcikowski attended Saint Barbe school and Saint Ann Highschool. In 1859, he enrolled at the Jagiellonian University in Kraków as a philosophy student and obtained his doctorate in philosophy in 1863.

== Career ==
In 1866, Belcikowski was appointed assistant in History of Polish Literature in Warsaw. In 1868, he left Warsaw and got back to Kraków. In 1869, he became professor in a junior high school in Lviv. In 1870 he was appointed professor of History of Polish Literature at the Jagiellonian University in Kraków alongside Stanisław Tarnowski. In 1876, he became "skryptor" of the Library of the Jagiellonian University, a title that would last till his death. There are two aspects in his works that are research and creation. He wrote novels, sort stories as well as dramas and comedies. Within a collective publication he published a series of critics and historical researches under the title "Ze stuyów nad literarurą polską". This publication was issued on the exact 25th year of his taking on writing. Adam Belcikowski was buried in Rakowicki Cemetery in Kraków.

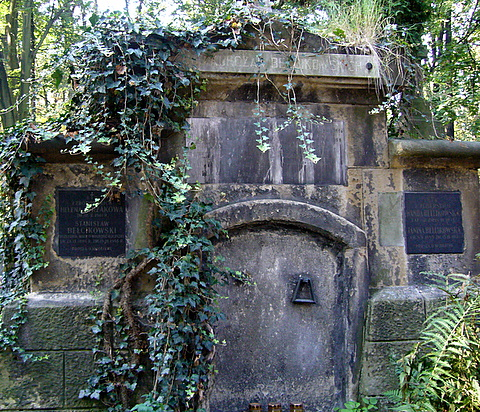
Tomb of the Belcikowski family in Kraków

== Bibliography ==
- Dramata i komedje (5 tomes, Kraków, 1898)
- Ze studiów nad literaturą polską (1886)
- Dług honorowy (1872)
- Patryarcha (1872)
- Domowe ognisko (1885)
- Stary kawaler (1885).
