= Stanisław Smreczyński =

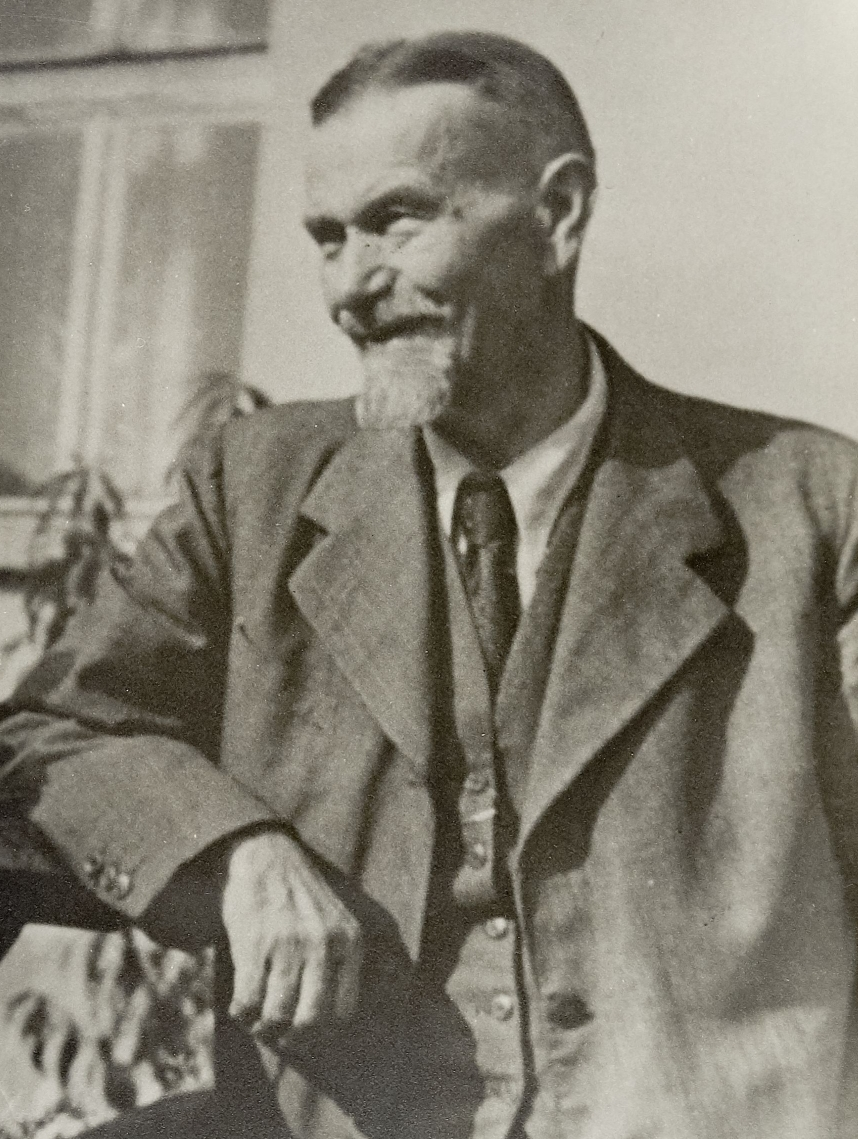
- Stanisław Smreczyński
- Born: 1899
- Died: 1975 (aged 75–76)
- Scientific career
- Fields: embryology
- Workplaces: Jagiellonian University

Stanisław Smreczyński (11 July 1899 – 6 April 1975) was the founding father of the Department of Systematic Zoology and Zoogeography of the Jagiellonian University. He was known for his contributions to contemporary understanding of early embryonic development of amphibians and insects as well as his expertise in Pleistocene and extant weevils (Curculionidae).
