= Gondwanenneboeus =

Scientific classification
- Domain: Eukaryota
- Kingdom: Animalia
- Phylum: Arthropoda
- Class: Insecta
- Order: Coleoptera
- Suborder: Polyphaga
- Infraorder: Cucujiformia
- Family: Archeocrypticidae
- Genus: Gondwanenneboeus; Kaszab, 1984
- Species: G. minutissimus

Binomial name
- Gondwanenneboeus minutissimus Kaszab, 1984

Synonyms
- Godwanenneboeus Auctt. (Missp.)

Genus of beetles

Gondwanenneboeus is a genus in the beetle family, Archeocrypticidae, first described in 1984 by Zoltán Kaszab. There is just one species in the genus, Gondwanenneboeus minutissimus. The genus is named for Gondwana Land, and is native to Australia.
