= International Congress for Finno-Ugric Studies =

International Congress for Finno-Ugric Studies (Congressus Internationalis Fenno-Ugristarum; CIFU) is the largest scientific meeting of scientists studying the culture and languages of Finno-Ugric peoples, held every five years. The first congress was organized in 1960 in Budapest. The last congress took place in 2025 in Tartu and the next congress is planned to be held in Budapest, Hungary in 2030.

== Congresses ==
- 1960 – CIFU I. Hungary, Budapest
- 1965 – CIFU II. Finland, Helsinki
- 1970 – CIFU III. USSR, Estonian SSR, Tallinn
- 1975 – CIFU IV. Hungary, Budapest
- 1980 – CIFU V. Finland, Turku
- 1985 – CIFU VI. USSR, Komi ASSR, Syktyvkar
- 1990 – CIFU VII. Hungary, Debrecen
- 1995 – CIFU VIII. Finland, Jyväskylä
- 2000 – CIFU IX. Estonia, Tartu
- 2005 – CIFU X. Russia, Republic of Mari El, Yoshkar-Ola
- 2010 – CIFU XI. Hungary, Piliscsaba
- 2015 – CIFU XII. Finland, Oulu
- 2022 – CIFU XIII. Austria, Vienna
- 2025 – CIFU XIV. Estonia, Tartu
- 2030 – CIFU XV. Hungary, Budapest

The decision on the date and venue of the congress and the scientific programme of the congress is made by the International Committee of the Finno-Ugric Congress (ICFUC).

According to the decision of the ICFUC, the 2010 Congress of Finno-Ugric Studies was organised by Hungary, where the Finno-Ugric Chair of the Pázmány Péter Catholic University (PPCU) was responsible for the event. The theme of the 11th International Congress of Finno-Ugric Studies (CIFU XI) was "Finno-Ugric Peoples and Languages in the 21st Century" and it took place in Piliscsaba from 9 to 14 August 2010. In 2015, the congress was held in Oulu, Finland and was organised by the University of Oulu. In 2022, the 13th CIFU was held in Vienna, Austria. In 2025, the XIV CIFU took place at the Institute of Estonian and General Linguistics of the University of Tartu, where a call was signed to recognize the South Estonian languages as indigenous regional languages and as everyday languages used in kindergartens and schools, as well as in public media. The XV CIFU will take place in 2030 at the Eötvös Loránd University in Budapest.
