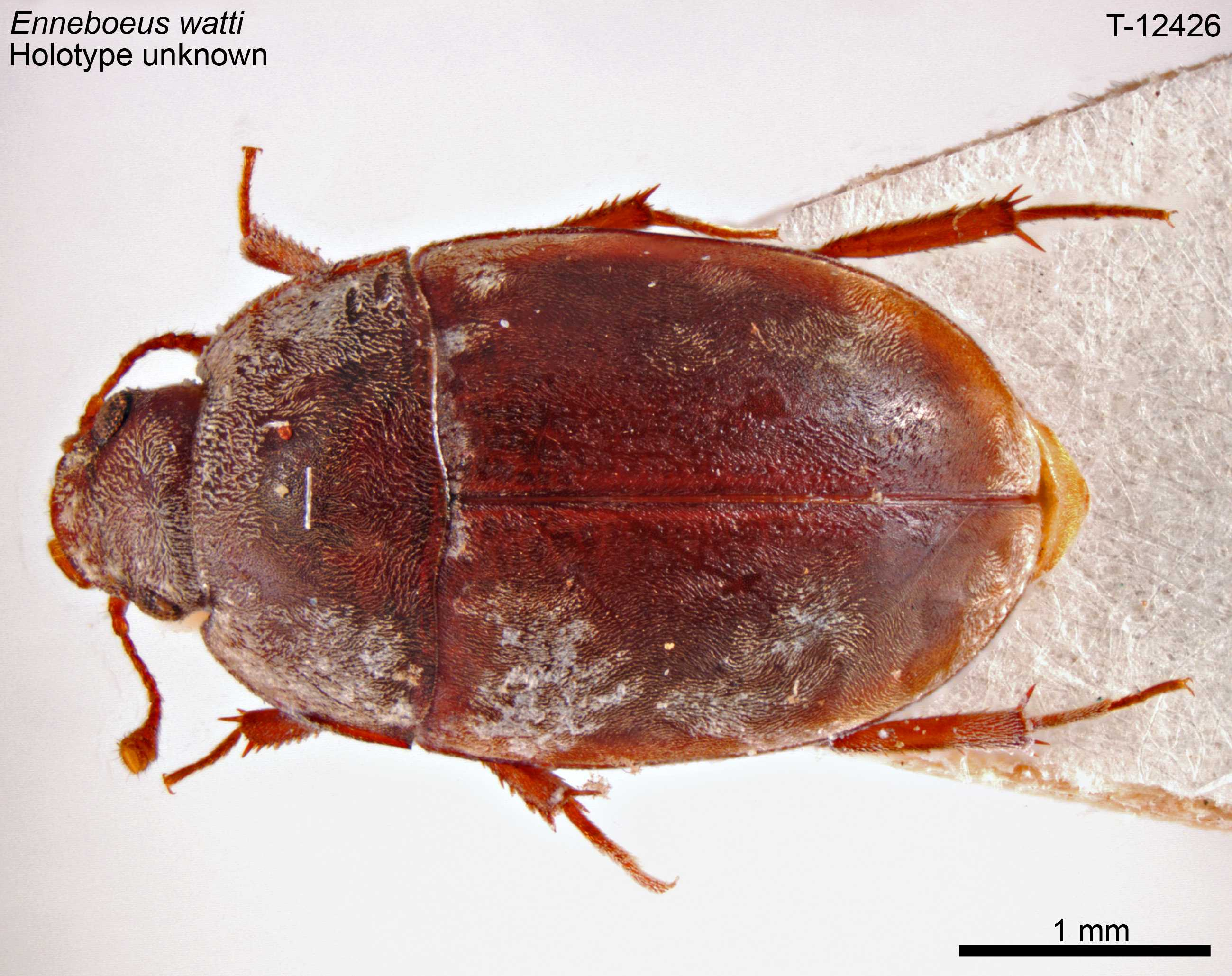
- Enneboeus watti

Scientific classification
- Domain: Eukaryota
- Kingdom: Animalia
- Phylum: Arthropoda
- Class: Insecta
- Order: Coleoptera
- Suborder: Polyphaga
- Infraorder: Cucujiformia
- Family: Archeocrypticidae
- Genus: Enneboeus; Waterhouse, 1878

= Enneboeus =

Genus of beetles

Enneboeus is a genus of cryptic fungus beetles, family Archeocrypticidae. There are at least two described species in Enneboeus. It is found in the Neotropics.

== Species ==
These two species belong to the genus Enneboeus:

- Enneboeus caseyi Kaszab, 1981^{i c g b}
- Enneboeus marmoratus Champion, 1893^{b}

Data sources: i = ITIS, c = Catalogue of Life, g = GBIF, b = Bugguide.net
