= Enneboeus caseyi =

Scientific classification
- Domain: Eukaryota
- Kingdom: Animalia
- Phylum: Arthropoda
- Class: Insecta
- Order: Coleoptera
- Suborder: Polyphaga
- Infraorder: Cucujiformia
- Family: Archeocrypticidae
- Genus: Enneboeus
- Species: E. caseyi

Binomial name
- Enneboeus caseyi Kaszab, 1981

Synonyms
- Enneboeus ovalis (Casey, 1889)

Species of beetle

Enneboeus caseyi is a species of cryptic fungus beetle in the family Archeocrypticidae. It is found in Central America and North America.
