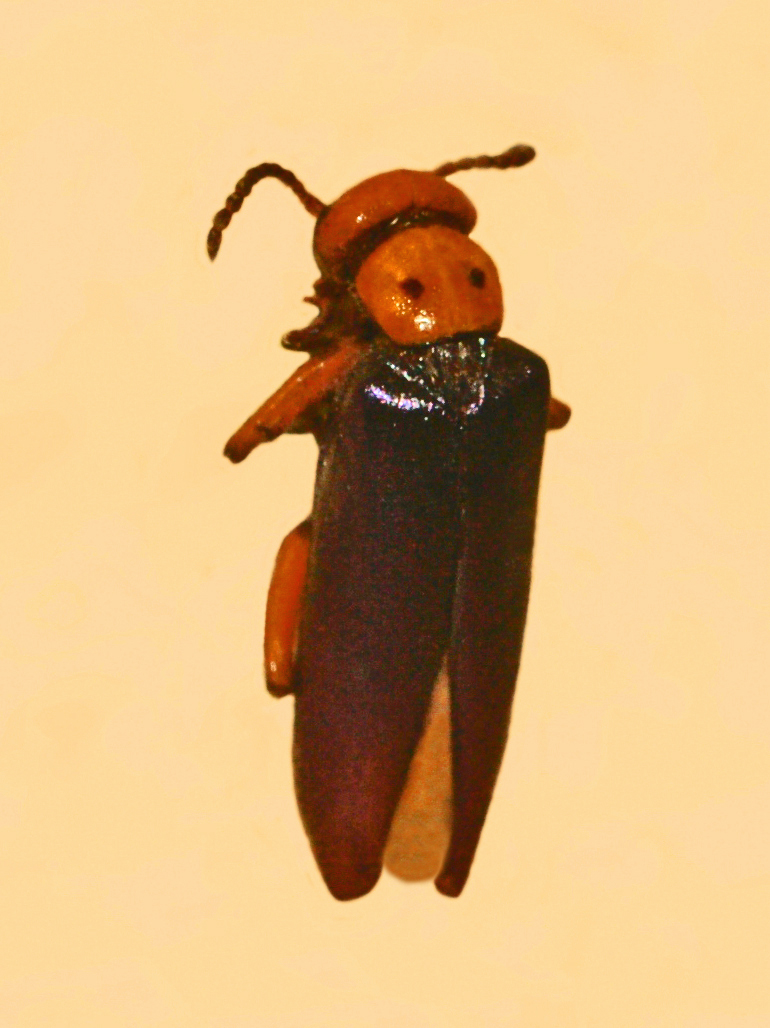
- Muzimes collaris

Scientific classification
- Domain: Eukaryota
- Kingdom: Animalia
- Phylum: Arthropoda
- Class: Insecta
- Order: Coleoptera
- Suborder: Polyphaga
- Infraorder: Cucujiformia
- Family: Meloidae
- Tribe: Lyttini
- Genus: Muzimes; Aksentjev, 1988

= Muzimes =

Genus of beetles

Muzimes is a genus of blister beetles belonging to the family Meloidae.

== Species ==
- Muzimes collaris (Fabricius, 1787)
- Muzimes dersimensis (Kaszab)
- Muzimes obenbergeri (Kaszab)
- Muzimes sterbai (Maran)
- Muzimes tauricus (Maran)
