= Neuronus IBRO & IRUN Neuroscience Forum =

Polish neuroscience conference

Neuronus Neuroscience Forum is an annual conference organized at the Jagiellonian University in Kraków, Poland for young researchers from diverse subdiscplines of neuroscience. Most of the topics cover neurobiology, cognitive and affective neuroscience, as well as clinical neuroscience and neurology.

== Organizers ==
Neuronus Forums are operated by a team of researchers from Kraków, supported by neurobiology, psychology, and medical students from the Jagiellonian University Students' Neuroscience Society "Neuronus" and the "Jagiellonian University Neurology Student Club".

Support is also provided by:

- International Brain Research Organization
- International Research Universities Network
- Bratniak Foundation of the Jagiellonian University Students and Graduates

== Structure and objectives ==
The conference consists of keynote lectures given by invited speakers, followed by parallel symposia dedicated to cognitive and biological aspects of neuroscience, a session with clinical neuroscience presentations, as well as numerous poster presentations. Usually, 1-2 lectures per conference edition are given by IBRO International Alumni.

As the emphasis during Neuronus Forums is mostly put on the development of young scientists, events are accompanied by sessions on career opportunities or academic writing and reviewing. A few travel grants for pre-doctoral attendees from Central and Eastern European countries are available each year.

== History ==
Since 2008, four editions of two separate events have been organized each year. The first one, "Students' Neuroconference", has been organized by the Neuronus Students' Society and was mostly devoted to molecular and biological neuroscience. The second one, "Krakow Workshop on Psychophysiology", covers a field of cognitive neuroscience and has been organized by the Psychophysiology Laboratory of the Jagiellonian University.

The idea of merging these two conferences in 2012 has given rise to the IBRO & IRUN - featured annual event, which has taken place every year from 2012 to 2016 and in 2018.

== Post-conference publications ==
To summarize the presentations given by the conference attendees, special issues have been published in scientific journals, such as the International Journal of Psychophysiology (2012) and Advances in Cognitive Psychology.
