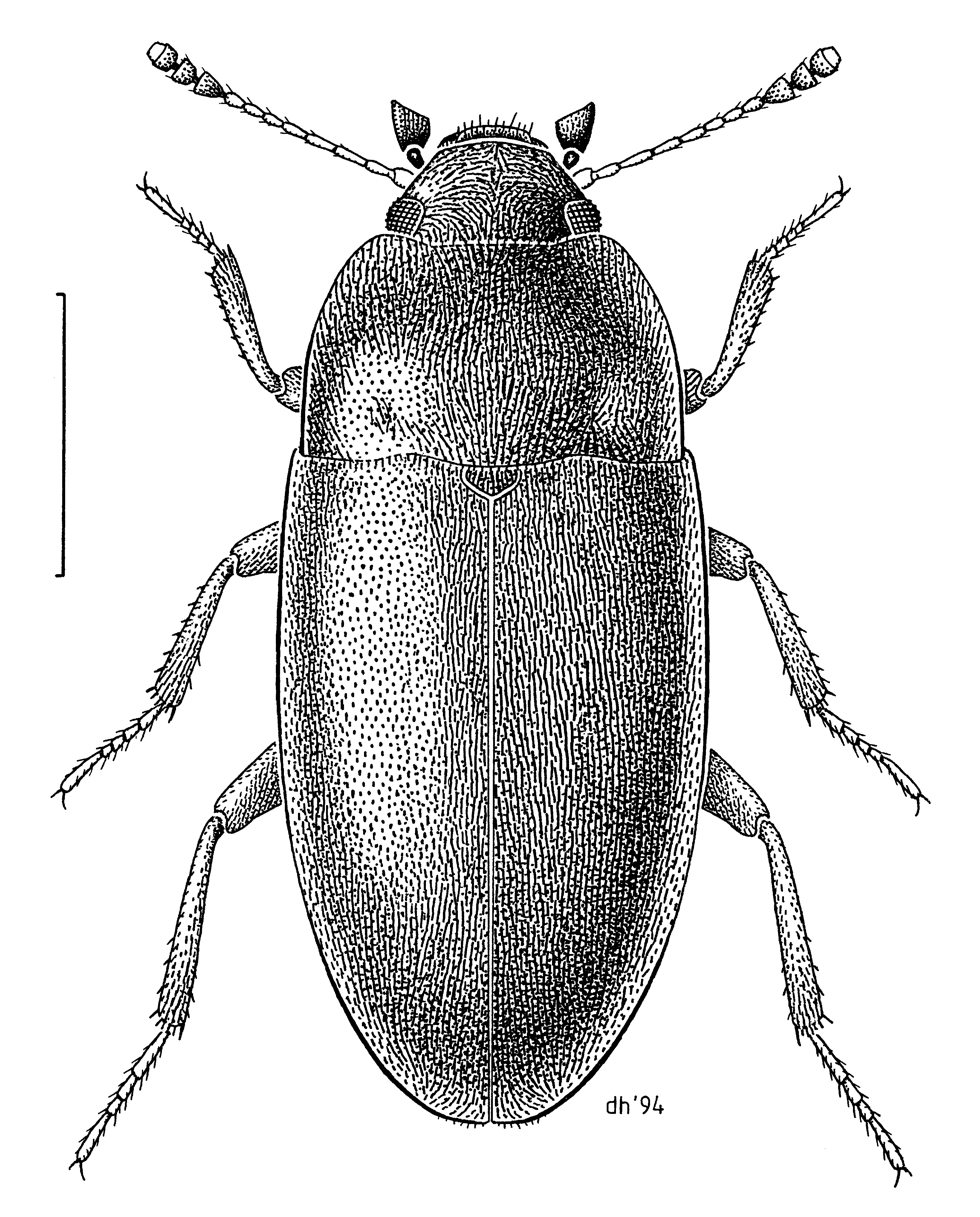

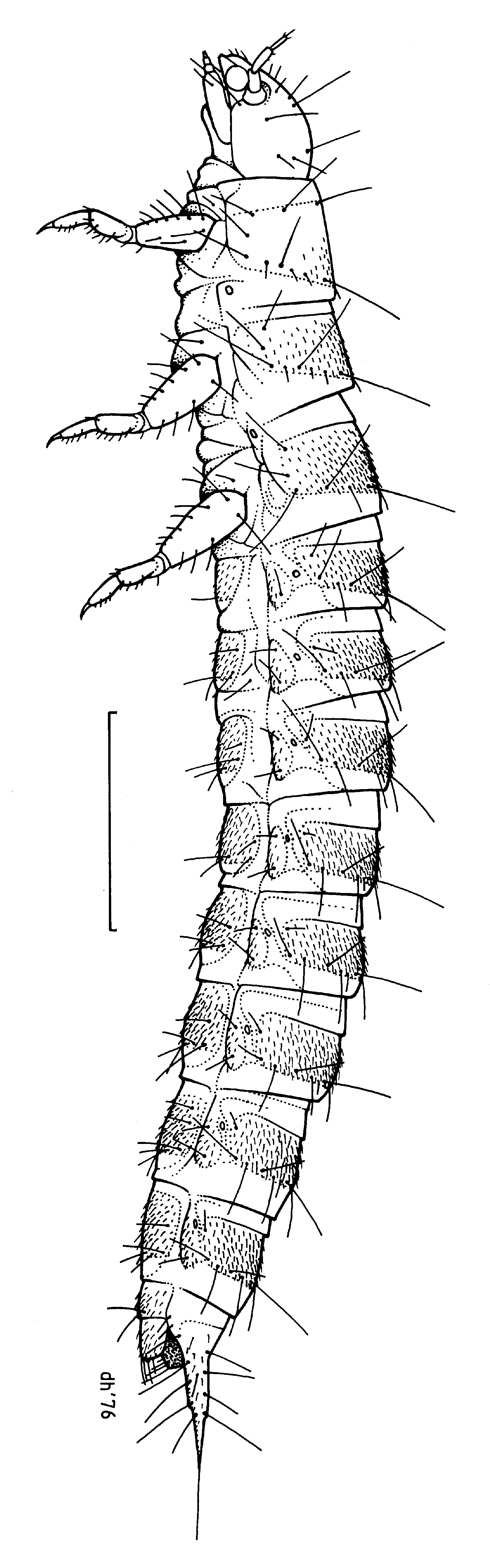
- Adult (top) and larvae (bottom) of Archeocrypticus topali

Scientific classification
- Kingdom: Animalia
- Phylum: Arthropoda
- Clade: Pancrustacea
- Class: Insecta
- Order: Coleoptera
- Suborder: Polyphaga
- Infraorder: Cucujiformia
- Superfamily: Tenebrionoidea
- Family: Archeocrypticidae; Kaszab, 1964

Genera
- See text

= Archeocrypticidae =

Family of beetles

The family Archeocrypticidae is a small group of beetles with no vernacular common name, though recent authors have coined the name cryptic fungus beetles. Adults and larvae seems to be saprophagous and are often found in plant litter. Worldwide, about 10 genera and 50 species are found, most species are pantropical. Enneboeus caseyi has been recorded from the American South, Central America, and Mexico. About 20 species are found in Australia, in the genera Enneboeus, Australenneboeus and Gondwanenneboeus, Archeocrypticus, Falsoplatydema, Nothenneboeus, Sivacrypticus and Wattianus. They are largely absent from the Palearctic and Nearctic regions.
