= Veľký Lapáš =

Village and municipality in Slovakia

Veľký Lapáš Nagylapás
- Municipality
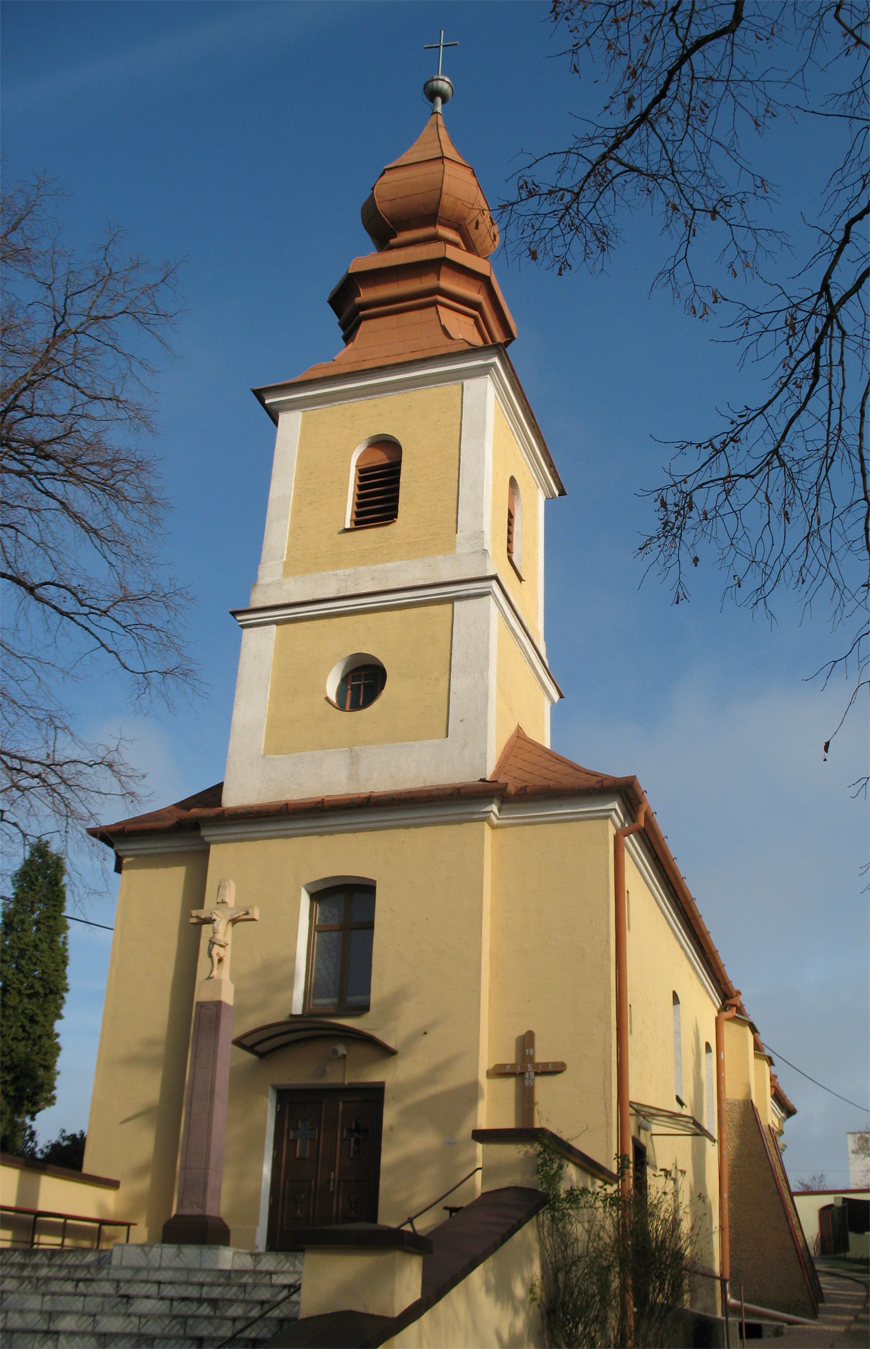

- Location of Veľký Lapáš in the Nitra Region Location of Veľký Lapáš in Slovakia
- Coordinates: 48.30°N 18.18°E
- Country: Slovakia
- Region: Nitra Region
- District: Nitra District
- First mentioned: 1113

Area
  - Total: 8.15 km^{2} (3.15 sq mi)
- Elevation: 160 m (520 ft)

Population (2025)
  - Total: 2,126
- Time zone: UTC+1 (CET)
  - Summer (DST): UTC+2 (CEST)
- Postal code: 951 04
- Area code: +421 37
- Vehicle registration plate (until 2022): NR
- Website: www.velkylapas.sk

Veľký Lapáš (Hungarian: Nagylapás) is a village and municipality in the Nitra District in western central Slovakia, in the Nitra Region.

== History ==
In historical records the village was first mentioned in 1113.

== Geography ==
The municipality lies at an altitude of 160 metres (520 ft) and covers an area of 8.15 km^{2} (3.15 sq mi) (2025).

== Population ==
Population statistic (10 years)
Year	1995	2005	2015	2025
Count	1109	1157	1291	2126
Difference		+4.32%	+11.58%	+64.67%

Population statistic
Year	2024	2025
Count	2101	2126
Difference		+1.18%

It has a population of 2126 people (31 December 2025).

=== Ethnicity ===
Census 2021 (1+ %)
Ethnicity	Number	Fraction
Slovak	1818	96.34%
Not found out	35	1.85%
Hungarian	35	1.85%
Total	1887	

In year 2021 was 1887 people by ethnicity 1818 as Slovak, 35 as Not found out, 35 as Hungarian, 14 as Czech, 8 as Other, 5 as Russian, 2 as Irish, 2 as Rusyn, 2 as Polish, 1 as Italian, 1 as Romani, 1 as Austrian, 1 as German, 1 as Croatian and 1 as Albanian.

Note on population: The difference values of population numbers in the table "Population statistic" and in the sections "Ethnicity" & "Religion" is caused by the use of various statistical methods.

=== Religion ===
Census 2021 (1+ %)
Religion	Number	Fraction
Roman Catholic Church	1366	72.39%
None	415	21.99%
Not found out	36	1.91%
Evangelical Church	21	1.11%
Total	1887	

In year 2021 was 1887 people by religion 1366 from Roman Catholic Church, 415 from None, 36 from Not found out, 21 from Evangelical Church, 12 from Greek Catholic Church, 10 from Christian Congregations in Slovakia, 9 from Other, 6 from Ad hoc movements, 4 from Apostolic Church, 2 from Calvinist Church, 2 from Eastern Orthodox Church, 2 from Buddhism, 1 from Old Catholic Church and 1 from United Methodist Church.

== Twin towns — sister cities ==
Veľký Lapáš is twinned with:

- Piliscsaba, Hungary (2004)
