= International Research Universities Network =

Network of research universities in Europe

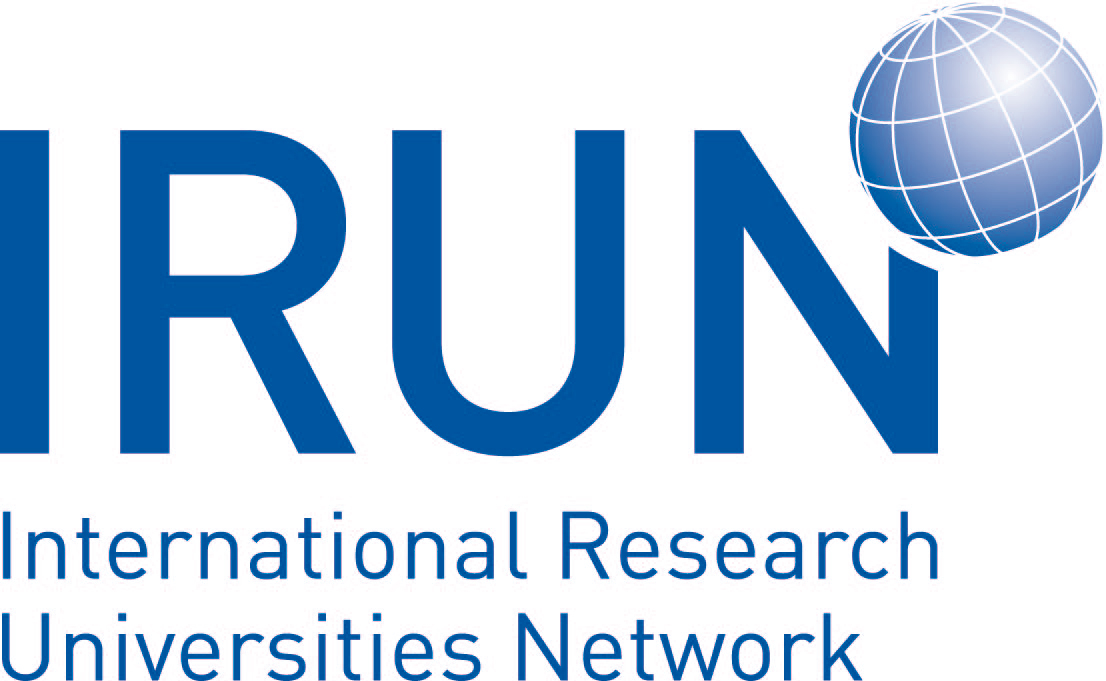

The International Research Universities Network (IRUN), initiated in 2006 by Radboud University Nijmegen in the Netherlands, was officially founded during a meeting in September 2007 in Nijmegen. Representatives from each of the network’s nine founding partner universities signed the IRUN Charter. IRUN currently represents eight European countries and is expected to grow in numbers of universities, countries and world regions represented. All universities currently in the network are research universities: their teaching efforts are predicated on the vigour and quality of their own research programmes and recent international scientific developments. It is the goal of IRUN that all research produced by the partners is pioneering and innovative.

IRUN aims to stimulate the internationalisation of higher education through exchanges and research collaboration. In other words, the partner universities are committed to increasing the international exchange of their excellent students and research staff, as well as to developing joint Master and PhD programmes between partners.

IRUN is guided by the core principle that international collaboration between high-quality research universities helps to reinforce the manifest international character of their educational programmes and offers new possibilities to encourage their development.

== IRUN Network of Female Professors ==
The IRUN Network of Female Professors was founded as a result of the 1st Conference Women in Science in March 2008. Main aim of the network is to foster the participation of women in science, starting at their own university. The second Conference of the IRUN Network of Female Professors was organised by the University of Münster on April 17 and 18, 2009. IRUN partners Duisburg-Essen, Glasgow, Kraków, Münster, Nijmegen and Siena participated. The third conference will be organised by the University of Siena in 2010.

== Members ==
France

- Université de Poitiers

Germany

- University of Münster

Hungary

- Pázmány Péter Catholic University, Budapest

Italy

- University of Siena

Netherlands

- Radboud University Nijmegen

Poland

- Jagiellonian University, Kraków

Spain

- University of Barcelona

United Kingdom

- University of Glasgow

== See also ==
- List of higher education associations and alliances
- Neuronus IBRO & IRUN Neuroscience Forum
- National Institutes of Technology – 31 leading public engineering universities in India
