= Imre Makovecz =

Hungarian architect (1935–2011)

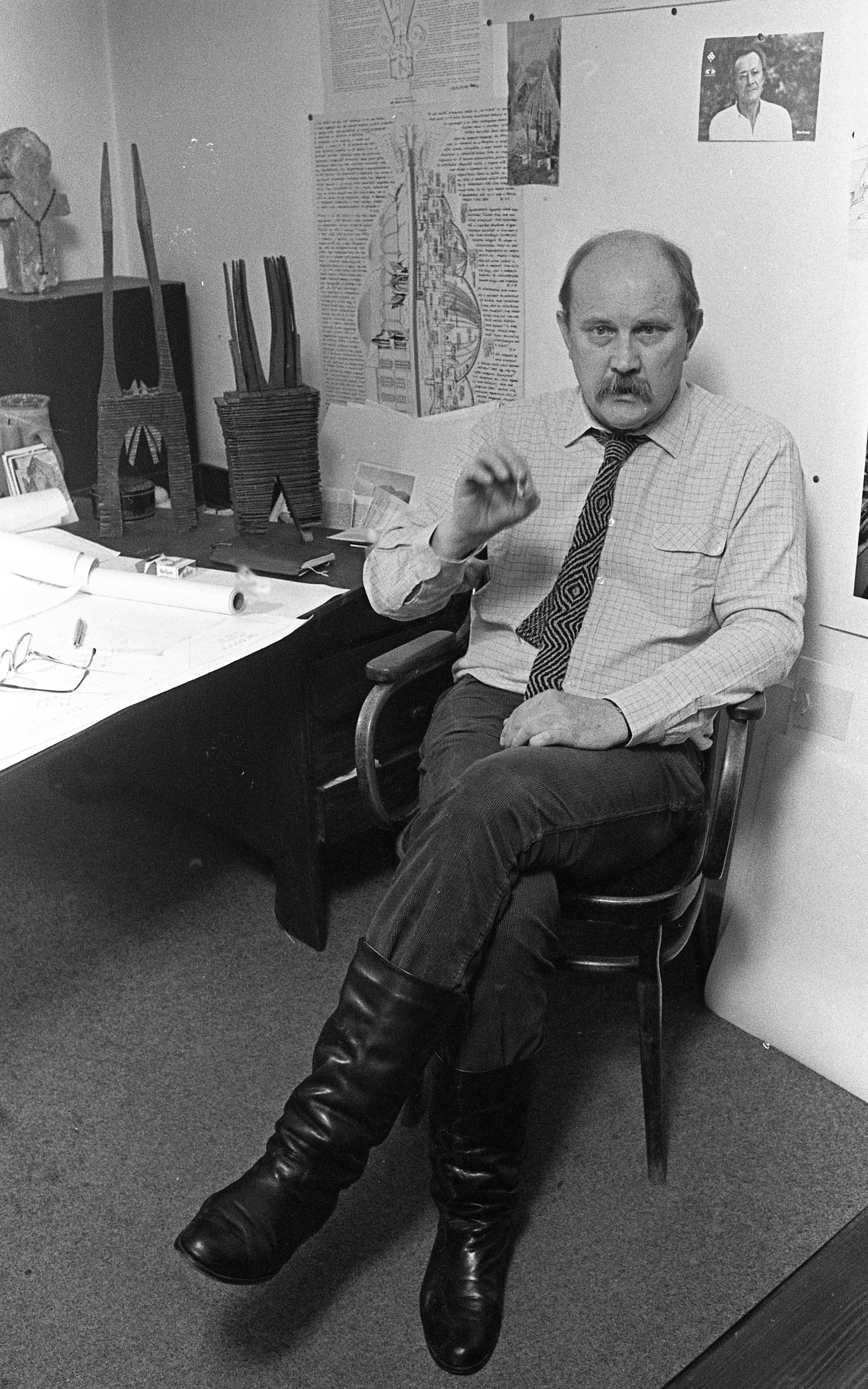
- Born: November 20, 1935; Budapest, Hungary
- Died: September 27, 2011 (aged 75); Budapest, Hungary
- Education: Technical University of Budapest
- Occupation: Architect
- Spouse: Marianne Szabó
- Children: 3

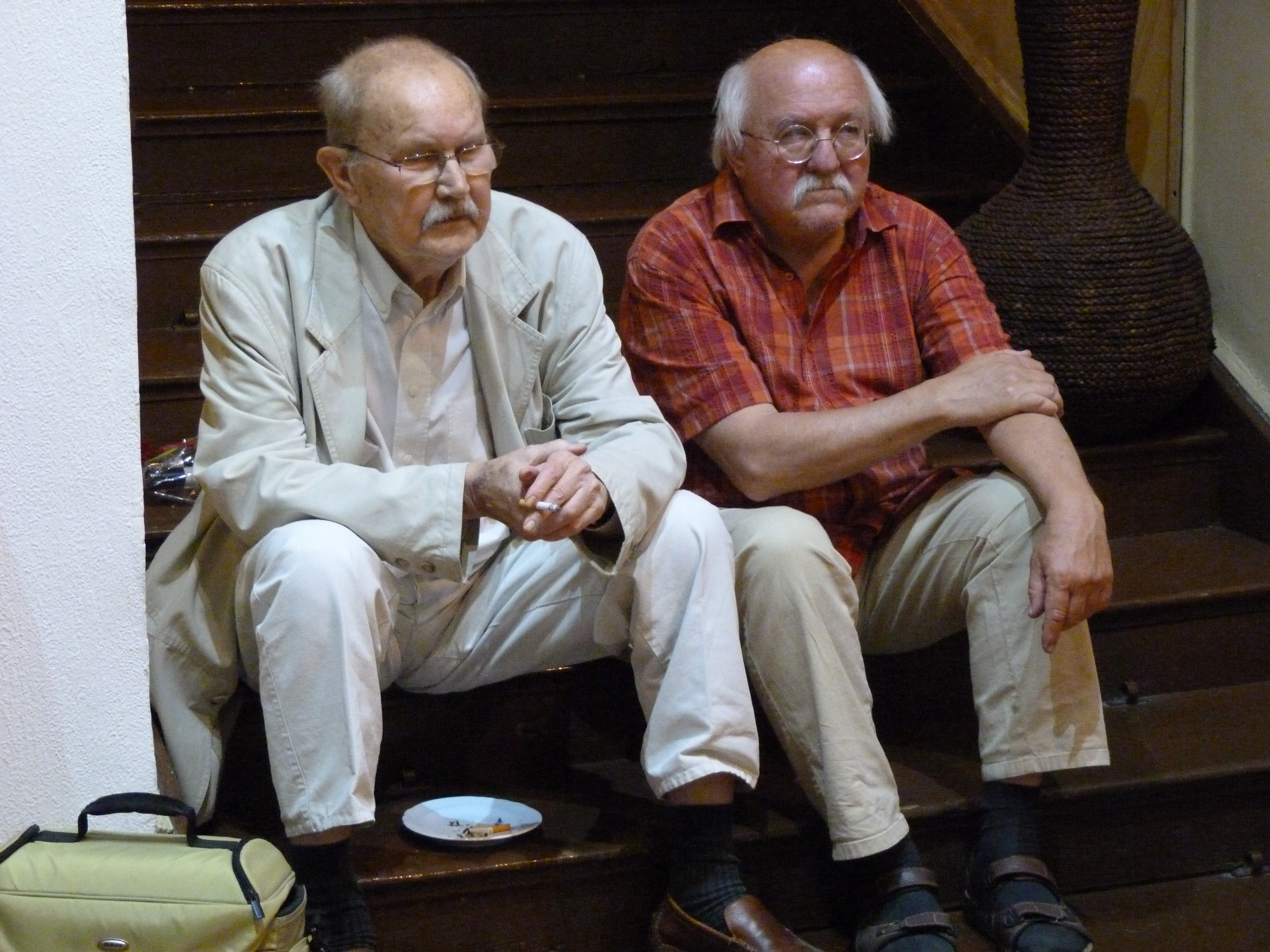
Imre Makovecz (left) in 2011

Imre Makovecz (November 20, 1935 – September 27, 2011) was a Hungarian architect active in Europe from the late 1950s onward.

Makovecz was born and died in Budapest. He attended the Technical University of Budapest. He was founder and "eternal and executive president" of the Hungarian Academy of Arts. He won the Ybl Prize ((hu) and the Kossuth Prize.

Makovecz was one of the most prominent proponents of organic architecture. As such, his buildings attempt to work with the natural surroundings rather than triumph over them. Frank Lloyd Wright and Rudolf Steiner are both strong influences, as is traditional Hungarian art.

His work began as a critique of communist ideology and the brutal uniformity of system building, but after the fall of the Communist regime in 1989, it became a comment on the nature of globalisation and corporate culture. In its attempts to refer to and build on Hungarian national archetypes, Makovecz was continuing the work and ideas of the architects of Hungarian Art Nouveau and National Romanticism. The first English language monograph on his work, Imre Makovecz: The Wings of the Soul, by Edwin Heathcote, was published in 1997. More recently, his work has been examined in the broader context of Hungarian culture to which also belongs organic cinema.

Makovecz was a devout Roman Catholic.

== Notable works ==
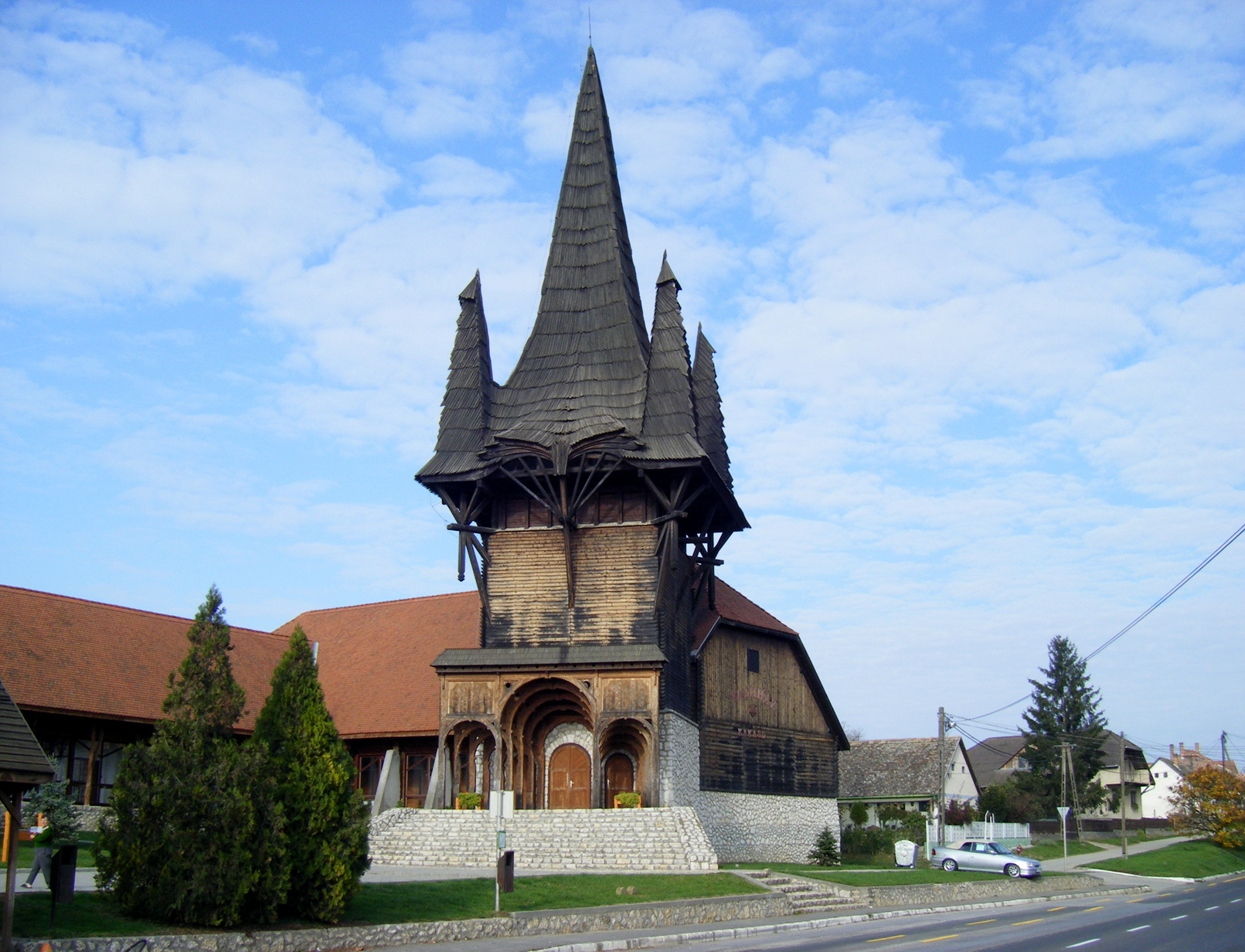
Kakasd Community Center (1996)

- His group designed the buildings of the Piliscsaba campus of Pázmány Péter Catholic University.
- The Hungarian pavilion at the Seville Expo '92 in Seville, Spain
- A secondary school in Sárospatak

== Gallery ==
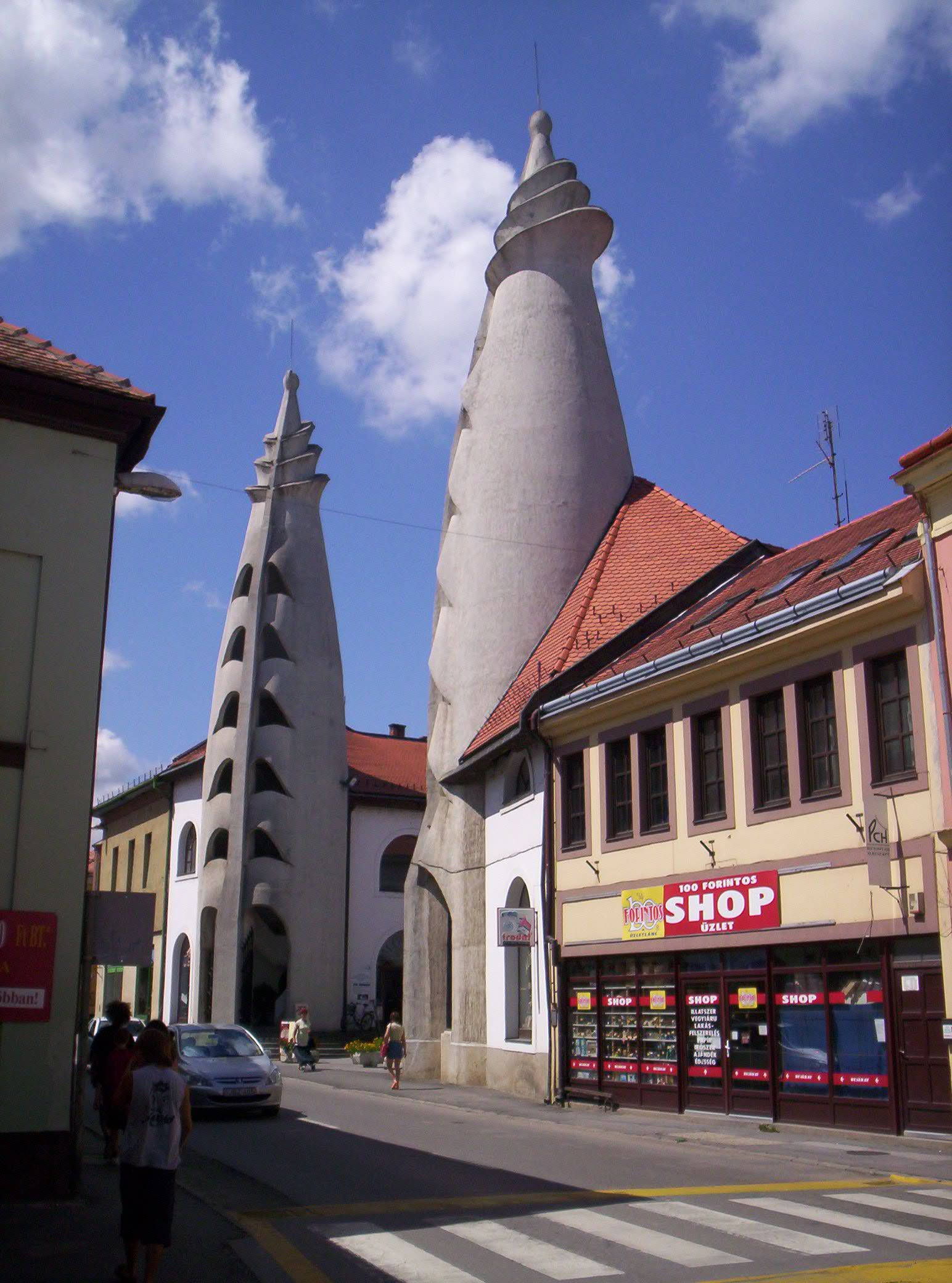
Cultural Centre, Szigetvár (1985)

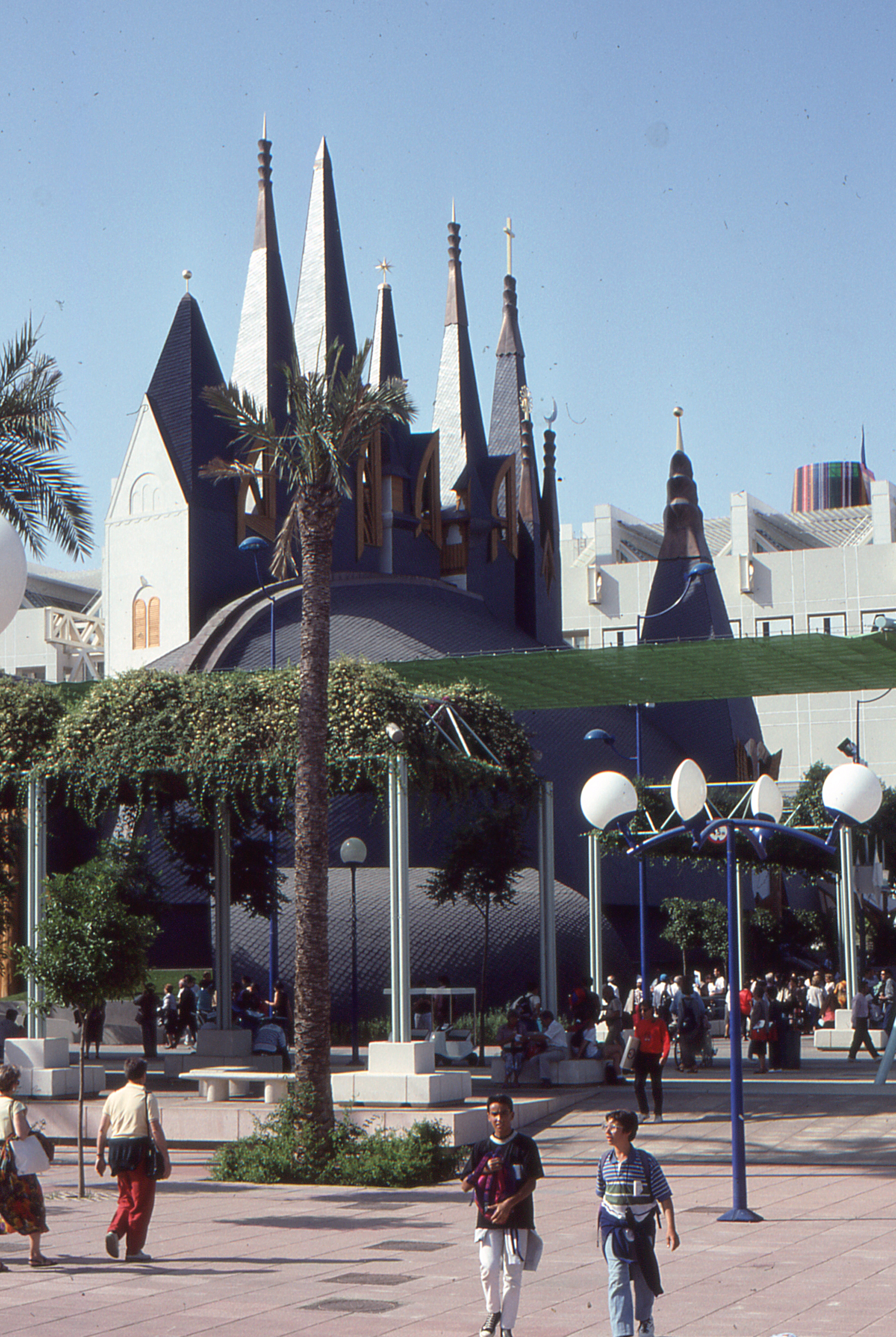
Hungarian Pavilion, Universal Exposition Sevilla 1992, Spain

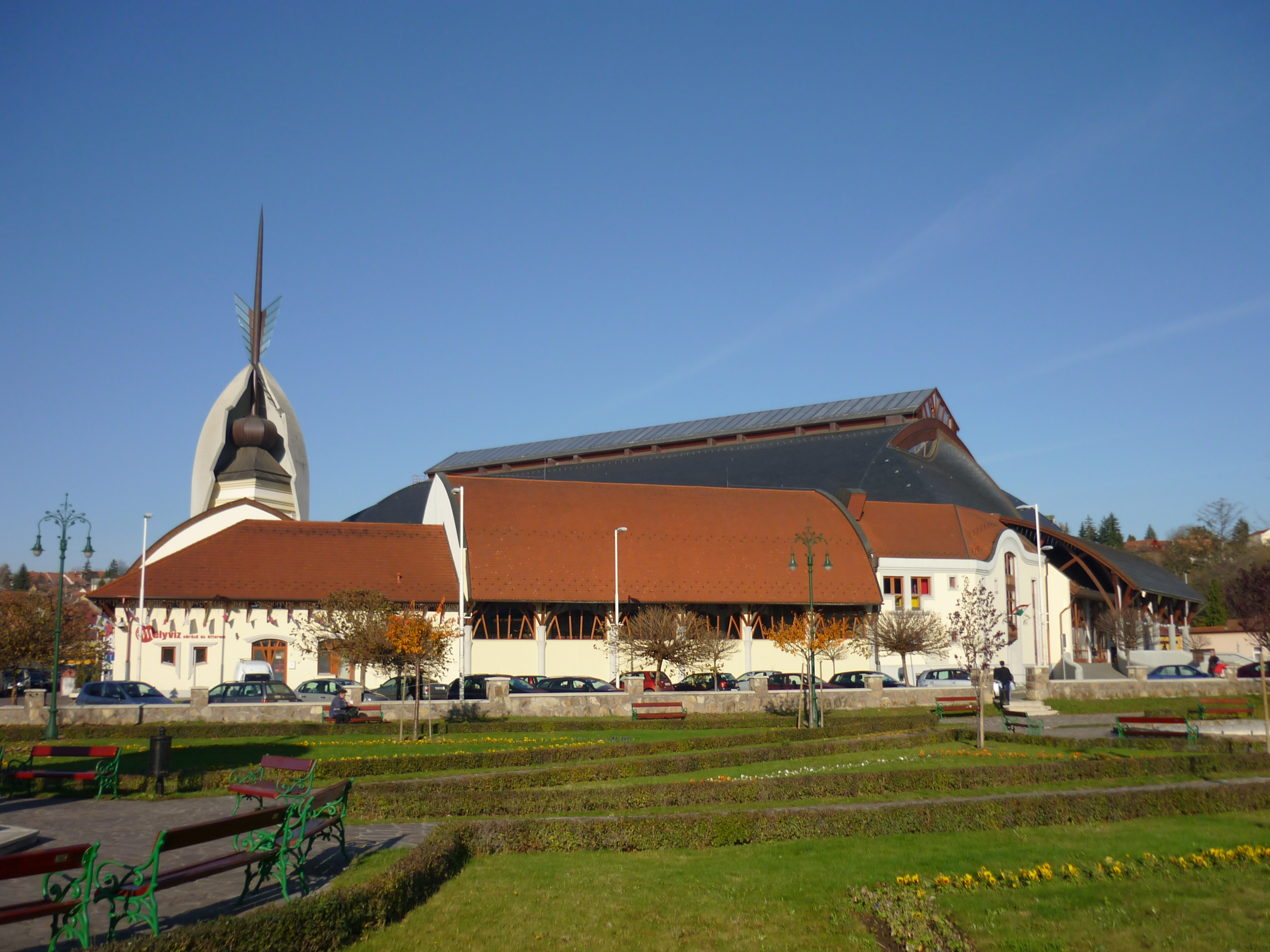
Swimming Pool, Eger (2000)

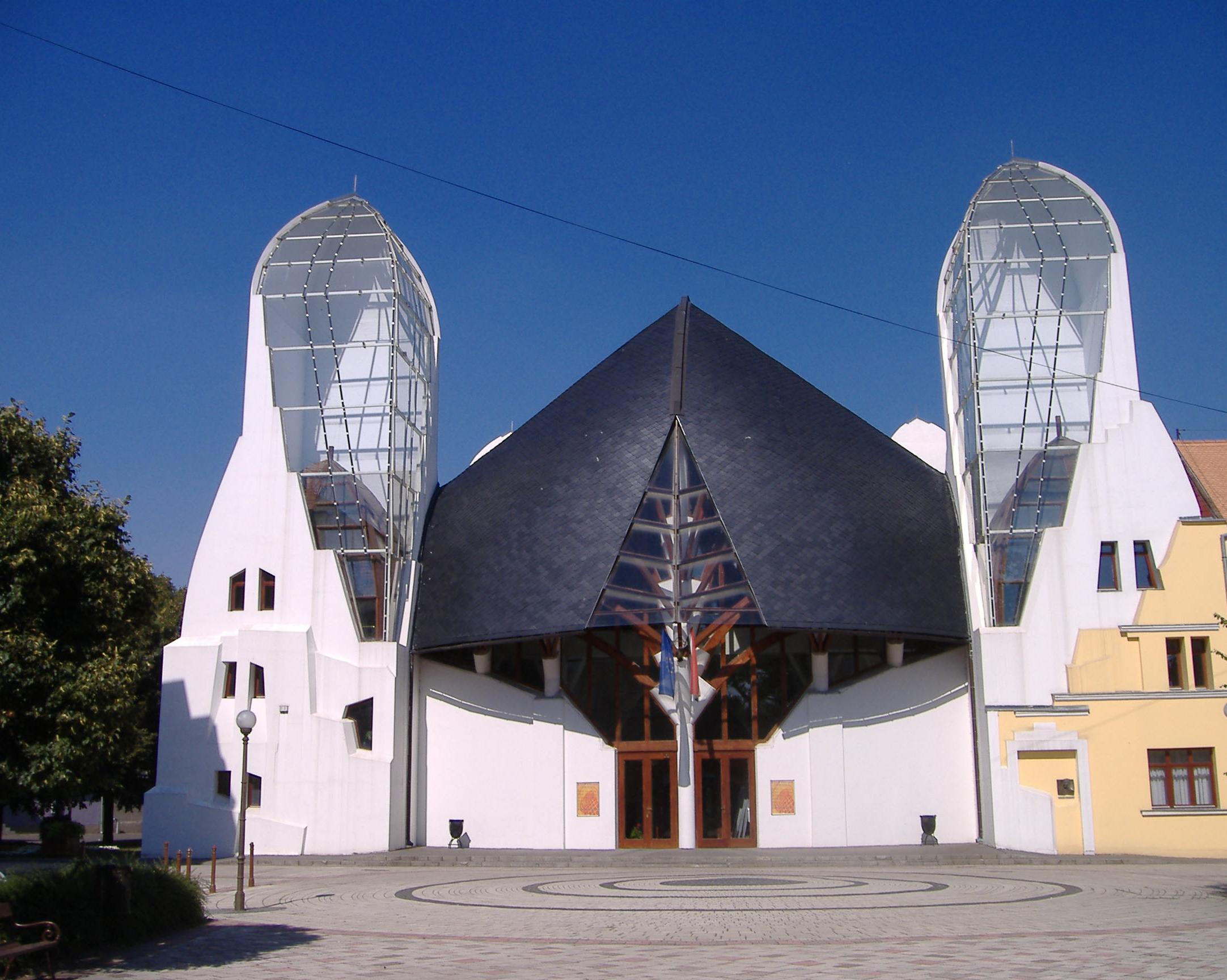
OnionHouse Theatre, Makó (1995)

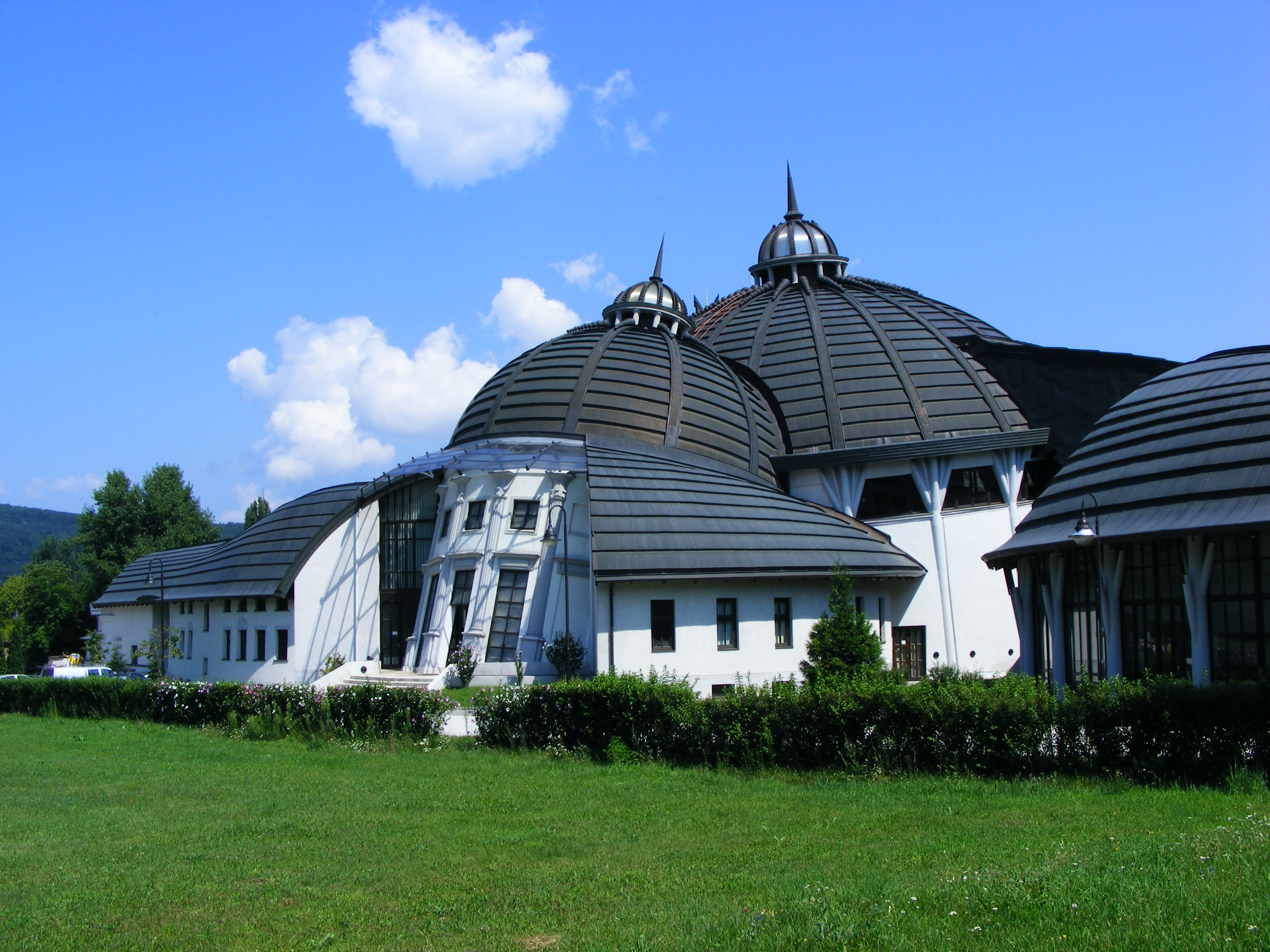
Stephaneum, Piliscsaba (1995)

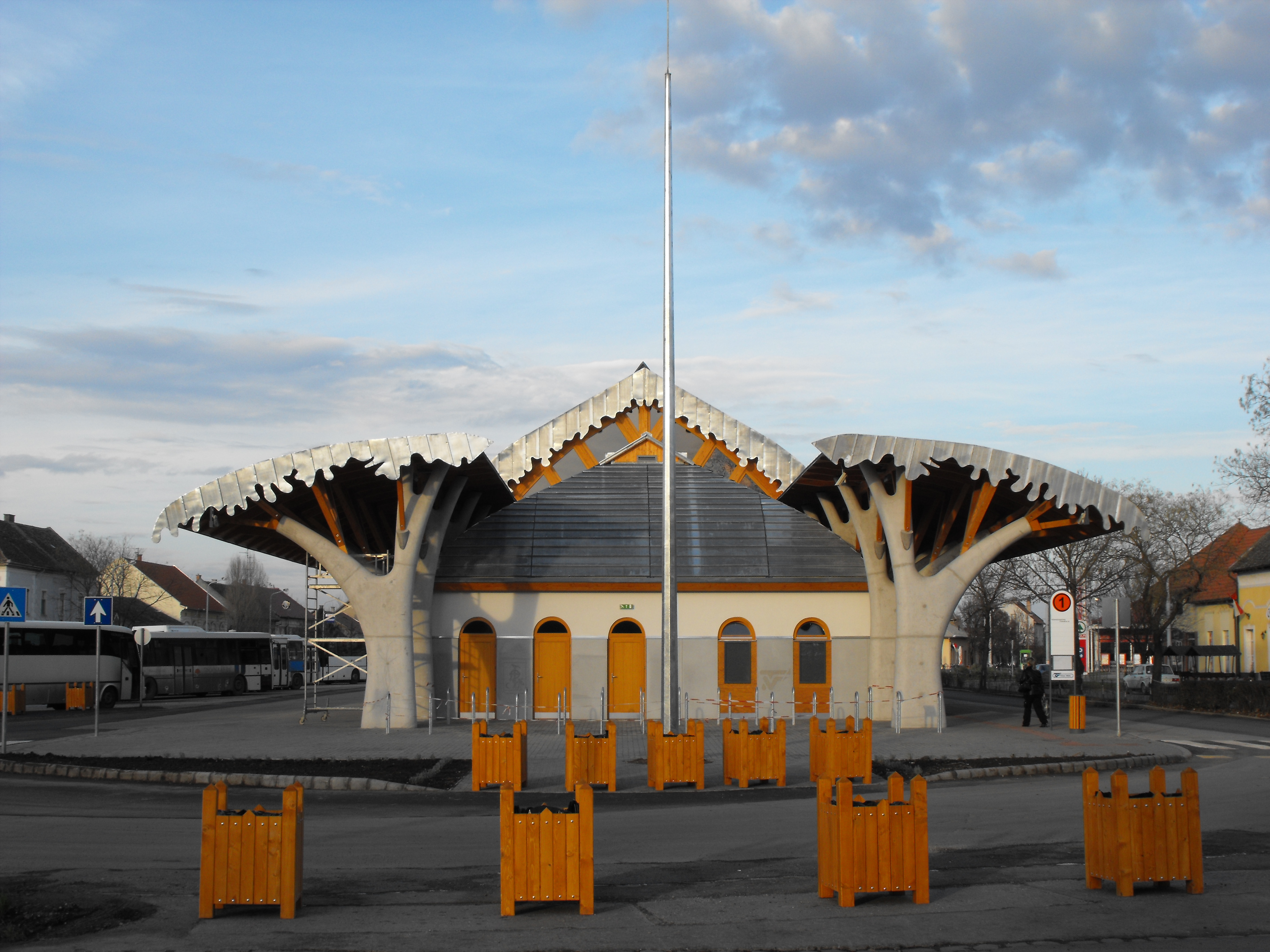
Bus terminal, Makó (2010)

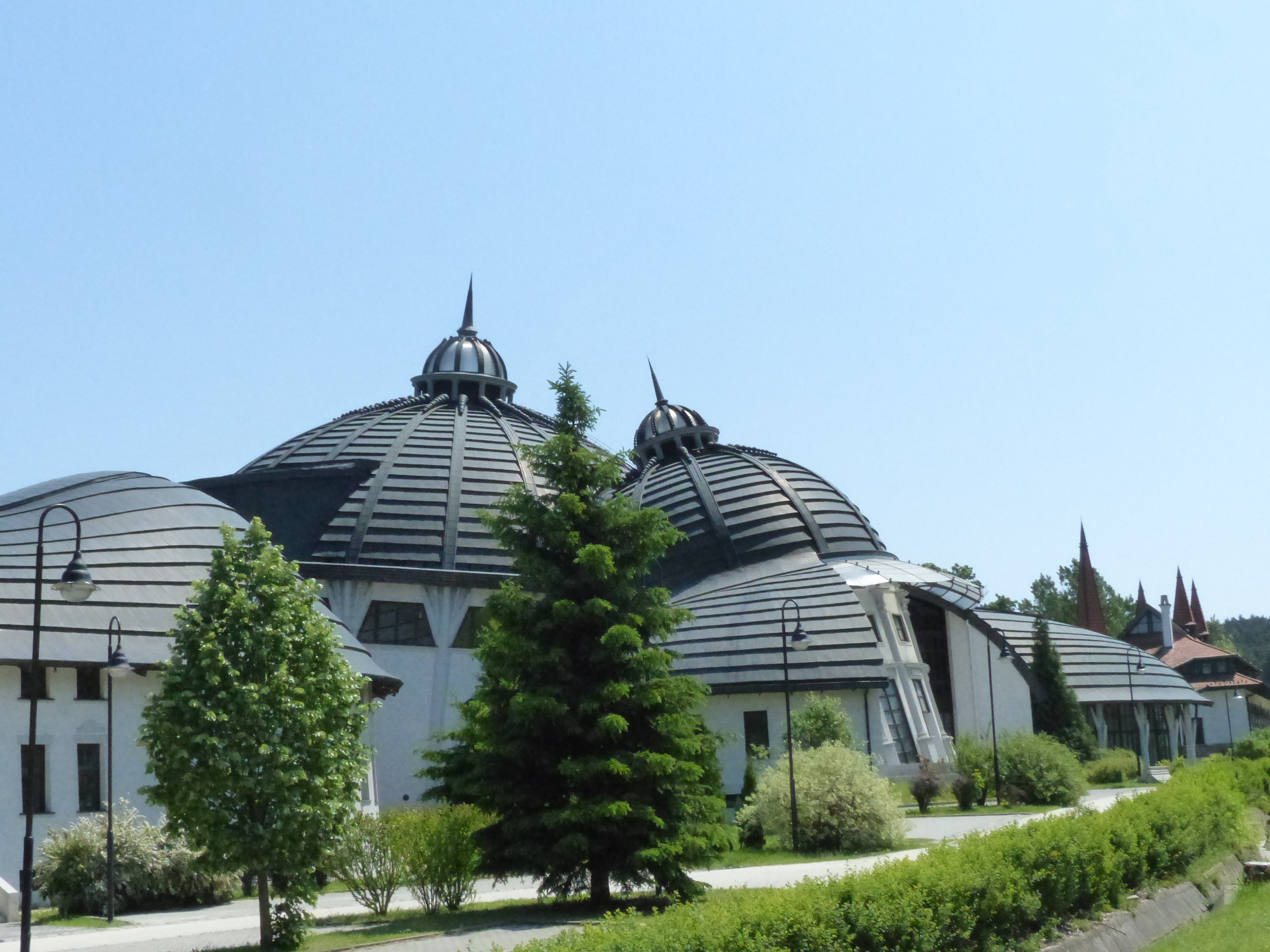
Stephaneum
