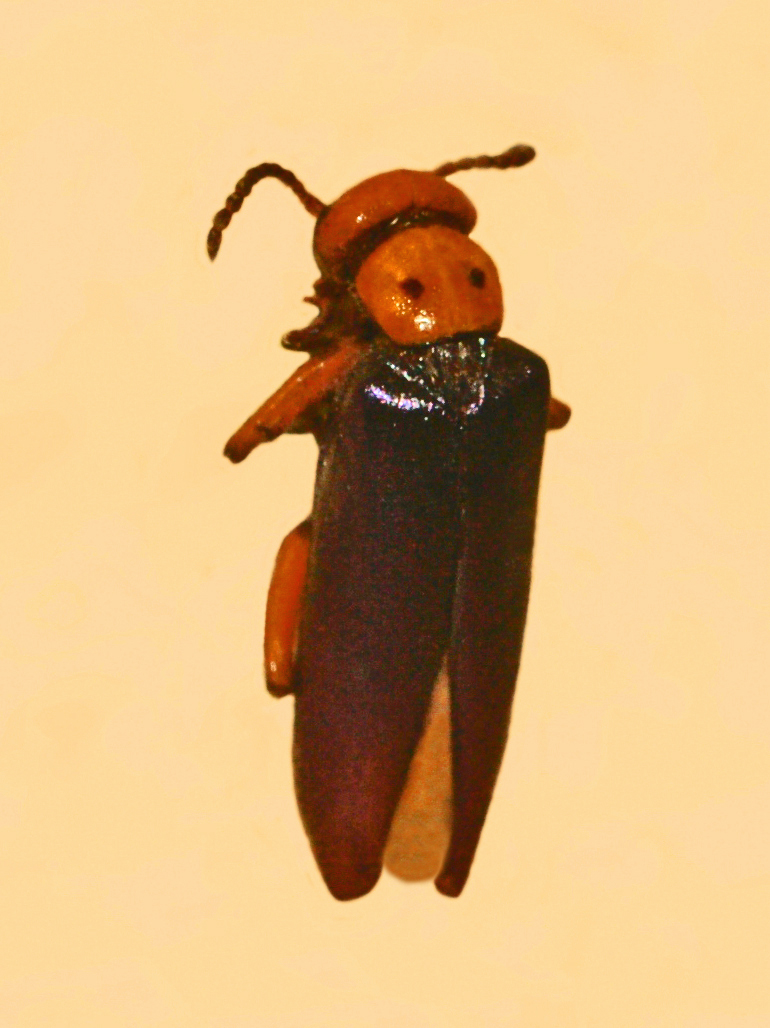
- Muzimes collaris from Iran. Museum specimen

Scientific classification
- Kingdom: Animalia
- Phylum: Arthropoda
- Clade: Pancrustacea
- Class: Insecta
- Order: Coleoptera
- Suborder: Polyphaga
- Infraorder: Cucujiformia
- Family: Meloidae
- Genus: Muzimes
- Species: M. collaris

Binomial name
- Muzimes collaris Fabricius, 1787

Synonyms
- Halosimus collaris; Alosimus collaris; Lytta collaris Fabricius, 1787; Micromerus collaris; Meloe erythrocynea Pallas, 1782

= Muzimes collaris =

Species of beetle

Muzimes collaris is a species of blister beetles belonging to the family Meloidae. This blister beetle can reach a length of about 40–50 millimetres (1.6–2.0 in). It is present in Bulgaria, Greece, Malta, North Macedonia, Republic of Moldova, Romania, Southern Russia and the Near East.
