= Árpád vezér grammar school =

Secondary school in Sárospatak

The Árpád Vezér Grammar School is a secondary school in Sárospatak, Hungary.

== Etymology ==
The school was named for Árpád vezér, who was a prominent figure in Hungarian history in the ninth century. He led the Settlement of the Magyars. The school's coat of arms recalls the period, depicting of trees from the settlement of Magyars. This tree of life symbolizes the tight and unbreakable relation between past and future, tradition and modernity.

The Arpád Vezér Grammar School is one of the youngest local secondary schools. Educational work started in 1993. The building was designed by Imre Makovecz.

The main objectives are:

- modern general education of students
- successful preparation of higher education institutions.

The school plays an important role in information technology, foreign language education, and talent management. Students perform successfully in national academic and sports competitions, graduate, and meet preliminary, ECDL exams and language requirements.

== Partner schools ==
The school became known within and outside Hungary's borders. Cooperation in European projects built a relationship with English, French, German and Romanian schools.

- Sándor Márai Hungarian - Language Grammar and Elementary School - Košice
- Grammar School of Veľké Kapušany - Veľké Kapušany
- Grammar School of Kráľovský Chlmec - Kráľovský Chlmec
- Béla Bartók High School - Timișoara
- Balázs Orbán Grammar School - Cristuru Secuiesc
