= Piliscsaba =

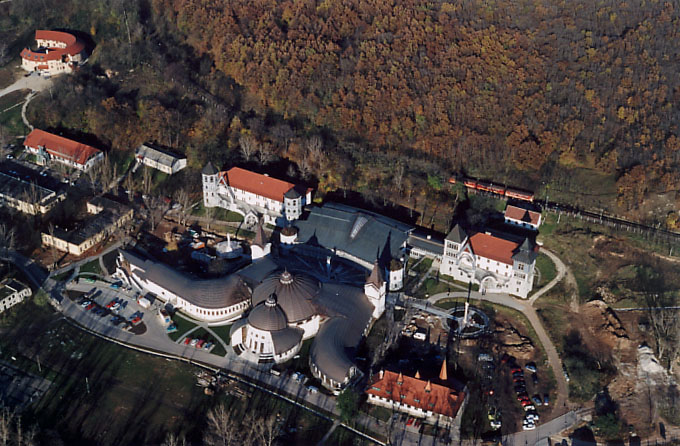
- Pázmány Péter Catholic University from above

- Flag Coat of arms

- Location within Hungary
- Coordinates: 47°37′N 18°50′E
- Country: Hungary
- County: Pest

Area
  - Total: 25.57 km^{2} (9.87 sq mi)

Population (2025)
  - Total: 8,533
  - Density: 320.45/km^{2} (830.0/sq mi)
- Time zone: UTC+1 (CET)
  - Summer (DST): UTC+2 (CEST)
- Postal code: 2081
- Area code: 26

Piliscsaba (Hungarian pronunciation: [ˈpiliʃt͡ʃɒbɒ]) is a town in Budapest metropolitan area, Hungary, located in northwestern Pest County, near the border of Komárom-Esztergom in a valley between the Buda and Pilis hills. It is accessible by Highway 10 and lies on the Budapest-Esztergom rail line, 24 km (15 mi) from the center of Budapest. The surrounding hills are 200–400 metres (660–1,310 ft) metres high.

Unemployment is about 4%, and a large proportion of the population commutes to Budapest (mostly for work or school).

The town is surrounded by forested hills: hills of the Pilis Mountains to the north and hills of the Budai Mountains to the south. Faculty of the Pázmány Péter Catholic University (at the Eastern gate of the city) is built on the site of former Soviet barracks (previously Hungarian barracks).

Imre Makovecz, a Hungarian architect designed a famous building called the Stephaneum in the city.

The 11th International Congress for Finno-Ugric Studies was held in Piliscsaba during 9–14 August 2010.

== Twin towns — sister cities ==
Piliscsaba is twinned with:

- Möckmühl, Germany (2004)
- Veľký Lapáš, Slovakia (2004)
- Cherasco, Italy (2005)
- Valea Seacă, Romania

== See also ==
- Csaba
