= Pázmány Péter Catholic University =

Private university in Budapest, Hungary

- Pázmány Péter Katolikus Egyetem
- Type: Private
- Established: 12 May 1950; 76 years ago
- Affiliations: IRUN; IFCU/FIUC; FUCE; CEECU; IAU; DRC; REVACERN; ELC; EAIE
- Rector: Géza Kuminetz
- Great Chancellor: Péter Erdő
- Academic staff: 546 (2013/14)
- Students: 7,910 (2013/14)
- Location: Budapest, Piliscsaba, Esztergom, Hungary; 47°29′30″N 19°03′58″E
- Campus: Suburban: 52 acre
- Website: www.ppke.hu

University rankings

Regional – Overall
- QS Emerging Europe and Central Asia: 231-240 (2022)

Pázmány Péter Catholic University (PPKE) (Hungarian: Pázmány Péter Katolikus Egyetem (PPKE)) is a private university in and near Budapest, Hungary, belonging to the Catholic Church and recognized by the state. While PPKE takes its name after an institution founded in 1635, it forms a modern, split-off limb from one of Hungary's oldest and most prestigious institutions of higher education, that has expanded further in the second half of the 20th century.

The Faculty of Theology was established by archbishop Péter Pázmány, as part of a new university, in Nagyszombat, the Kingdom of Hungary (today Trnava, Slovakia) in 1635 (the original university church is now the Cathedral of Trnava). This university was transferred to the present-day Budapest in 1777 and named after Pázmány in 1921. In 1950, the university was renamed to Eötvös Loránd University, but in the same year, the government split the Faculty of Theology off the university to form the independent Theological Academy as an anti-Church measure. After the fall of Communism, the Theological Academy was expanded with a faculty of humanities to form the Pázmány Péter Catholic University, which was accredited by the state in 1993.

The university is located in two cities: the Rectors' Office, the Faculty of Theology, the Faculty of Law, the Faculty of Information Technology, and the Postgraduate Institute of Canon-Law are located in Budapest. The campus of the Vitéz János Faculty of Teaching is in Esztergom, just across the Esztergom Basilica. The Faculty of Humanities operated a campus in Piliscsaba, in the vicinity of Budapest from 1994 until end-2020, after which it relocated its departments and courses to Budapest.

The university has several research groups and institutes. One of the most important international research programmes of the university is the Syro-Hungarian Archeological Mission, which does the restoration of Margat's crusader fortress.

Nearly 8.000 students attend the university, enrolled in several Bachelor, Master, and PhD programmes.

International cooperations include the Erasmus programme and bilateral agreements. It was named in 2009 as one of the most active members of the Erasmus programme. It is a co-establisher of the International Research Universities Network and has strong connections with Radboud University Nijmegen, Catholic University of Leuven, Pontificia Universidad Javeriana in Bogota, Saint Louis University and University of Notre Dame.

== Rectors ==
- 1992–1998 Msgr. Dr. Ferenc Gál
- 1998–2003 Msgr. Prof. Dr. Péter Erdő
- 2003–2011 Msgr. Prof. Dr. György Fodor
- 2011–2019 Msgr. Prof. Dr. Szabolcs Anzelm Szuromi O.Praem
- since 2019 Géza Kuminetz

== Great chancellors ==
- 1992–2005 Most rev. Dr. István Seregély, Archbishop of Eger
- 2005– Most rev. Em. Card. Prof. Dr. Péter Erdő DSc, Primate of Hungary, Archbishop of Esztergom-Budapest

== Academics ==
=== Faculties ===
The university has five faculties and two institutes.

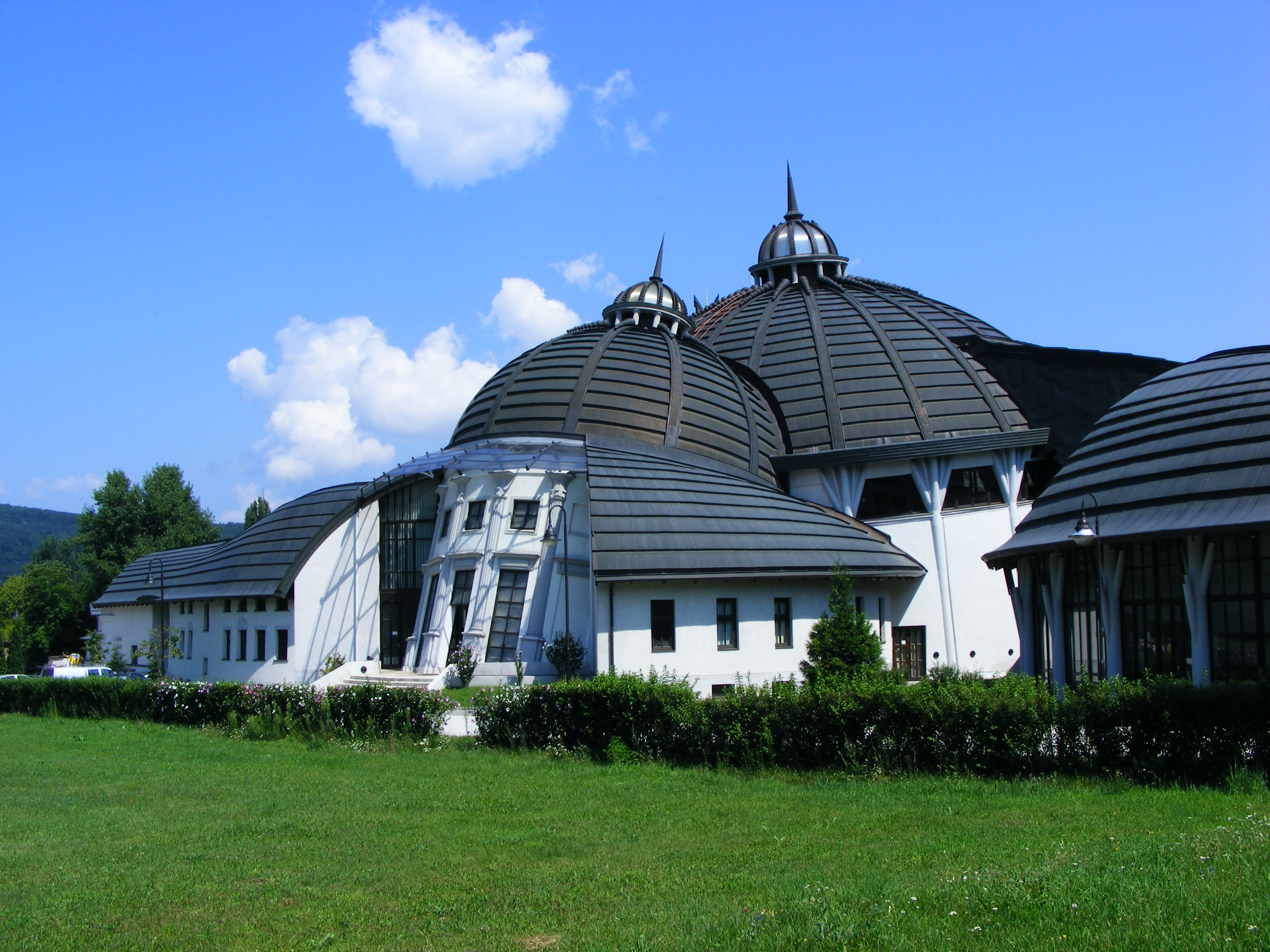
Stephaneum, the main building of the Faculty of Humanities

==== Faculty of Humanities ====
The Faculty of Humanities was established by the Hungarian Catholic Bishops' Conference on 30 January 1992. The government of Hungary accepted it on 25 May 1993. It has two locations in Budapest. It was located in the town of Piliscsaba from 1994 to 2020 after which the premises were handed to the state under a barter agreement. The campus was created from a Soviet barrack, on 220,000 m². As it is situated in a nature reserve, only pavilion-like buildings were allowed to be built which did not interfere with the landscape's harmony. Its buildings were designed by the group of Imre Makovecz and it has become an architectural landmark. The now-abandoned campus has a train station (since 1995) and a bus stop (since 1996); it is accessible from Budapest centre in less than an hour. Most of its students commuted on a daily basis, but it also had dormitories.

==== Faculty of Theology ====
Cardinal Pázmány established the university in Nagyszombat on 12 May 1635. It was approved by Emperor Ferdinand II on 8 October in the same year the inauguration ceremony took place on 13 November 1635. The theological faculty is now located at Veres Pálné u. 24, Budapest H-1053.

Because of its Jesuit links, the newly opened university was based on the Official Plan for Jesuit Education, or Ratio studiorum, which had been laid down on 8 January 1599. Pázmány was also influenced by Roman and Austrian structures of higher education.

The Faculty of Theology first moved to Buda and then to Pest. It was separated from the rest of the Pázmány Péter Science University in 1950 by the state and was able to continue her mission under the name of Roman Catholic Central Theological Academy. The authorization of the institute to give an academic degree in Sacred Theology (baccalaureatus, licentiatus, laureatus [doctoratus]) in the name of the Holy See during this time remained, while the diploma was also recognized by the state.

The classical five (baccalaureatus) plus two (licentiatus) plus one (doctoratus) years (the last two together is recognized as a PhD instruction by the state) Sacred Theology teaching program which is recognized by the Holy See is built on twelve departments:

- Department of Fundamental Theology;
- Department of Systematic Christian Philosophy;
- Department of History of Philosophy;
- Department of Old Testament Studies;
- Department of New Testament Studies;
- Department of Dogmatic Theology;
- Department of Moral Theology;
- Department of Liturgy and Pastoral Theology;
- Department of Patristic History and Literature;
- Department of Medieval and Modern Ecclesiastical History;
- Department of Canon Law;
- Department of Biblical Languages.

The departments do research work as part of the Theological Doctorate School. They also do teaching activity within the fields of mission of the Catholic Church. Serving this purpose, the Faculty has Bachelor programs to form Managers of Catholic Communities, Catechetic and Pastoral Assistants; there are also Master programs to form teachers of religion and Catholic Canon lawyers.

When political change happened in Hungary in 1990, the name of the faculty was changed to Pázmány Péter Roman Catholic Theological Academy as an independent university. It became a basis for the new Catholic university of Budapest which has today five flourishing faculties and one institute with faculty rights (i.e. Canon Law Institute). Every educational program of this ancient Theological Faculty of the Pázmány Péter Catholic University has received official state accreditation by the Hungarian Higher Educational Accreditation Committee, which has already accredited the entire university, including the Faculty of Theology, twice, most recently in 2010.

==== Institute of Canon Law ====
The Institute of Canon Law "ad instar facultatis" (Institute with faculty rights) was established by the Holy See on 30 November 1996. Canon law means the internal own law of the Catholic Church that applies to everyone baptized in the Catholic Church as well as to those who have joined the community of the Church. According to the ecclesiastical authorization the institute can issue baccalaureate, licenciate and doctorate academic degree in canon law.

The Hungarian State acknowledges the baccalaureate degree in canon law – based on the Bologna-System – as an MA degree, as well as the doctorate in canon law as a PhD The team of professors – Anzelm Szabolcs Szuromi O.Praem., Géza Kuminetz, Péter Szabó, Catherine Hársfai, George Lefkánits, Blazio Schanda, Csaba Szilágyi, and Philippe Gudenus – organize courses in canonical fields in Hungarian and in other languages (Italian, German, English).

The Institute of Canon Law "ad instar facultatis" undertakes scholarly research. To fulfill this aim the institute organizes a yearly international colloquia every February. It publishes an international canon law review Folia Canonica in the main western European languages (from 1998, from 2012: Folia Theologica et Canonica), but also a Hungarian review, i.e. Kánonjog (from 1999); furthermore, a book series, i.e. Bibliotheca Instituti Postgradualis Iuris Canonici Universitatis Catholicae de Petro Pázmány nominatae, which includes four sub-series.

In 2001 the institute organized the "Eleventh International Congress of the Consociatio Internationalis Studio Iuris Canonici Promovendo and the Fifteenth of the Società per il Diritto delle Chiese Orientali. Also the university Institute of Canon Law hosted the XIIIth International Congress of Medieval Canon Law, which took place in the St. Adalbert Teaching and Research Center of Esztergom in 2008.

The research fields of the faculty are ecclesiastical law; theology of canon law; general norms of canon law; constitutional law of the Church; liturgical law; Catholic marriage law; canonical norms of sacraments and sacramentals; canonical process law; canonical penal law; canon law of Eastern Churches; Medieval ius commune and canon law history.

The institute was decorated with the title of "Doctor Honoris Causa" Urbano Navarrete Cortes S.J. on 2 May 2000, one of the most significant 20th century canon lawyer, who worked for the renewal of the canonical knowledge in Hungary in the Eighties and died on 22 November 2010. The Canon Law Institute was enriched on 5 May 2011 with two new honorary doctors, i.e. José Tomás Martin de Agar and Bronisław Wenanty Zubert OFM.

==== Faculty of Information Technology and Bionics ====
The Faculty of Information Technology was established by the Hungarian Catholic Bishops' Conference on 24 June 1998. The government of Hungary accepted it on 20 July 2001. It was renamed to Faculty of Information Technology and Bionics on 1 May 2013, effective as of 1 September 2013. It's located in Budapest.

==== Faculty of Law and Political Sciences ====
The Faculty of Law and Political Sciences was established on 3 April 1995. It is located in Budapest.

==== Vitéz János Faculty of Teaching ====
The Vitéz János Teaching College was founded on 3 November 1842, and integrated in the Pázmány Péter Catholic University as Vitéz János Faculty on 1 January 2008. It is in the city of Esztergom. The campus is around the Esztergom Basilica. Its Practicing School has been working since 31 August 1893.

=== Collegium Hungaricum ===
The Collegium Hungaricum (officially Collegium Hungaricum Lovaniense, the former Home Cardinal Mindszenty) is a house for Hungarian university students, researchers and teachers in the city of Leuven (25 km from Brussel), at the Blijde Inkomstraat 18. The owner of the building is the Hungarian Province of the Jesuit Order, but the maintainer is the Pázmány Péter Catholic University.

=== Research ===
==== Hungarian Bionic Vision Center ====
The goal of the Hungarian Bionic Vision Center is to restore vision of visually impaired patients to the maximum extent and to improve the quality of their lives through using medical and technological aids. They run programmes to study medical and engineering technologies.
Homepage: lataskozpont.itk.ppke.hu

==== Robot Lab ====
The RobotLab is to apply ideas inspired by Biology using Information Technologies. How is it possible to design better prosthesis? Can neurobiology help to develop new remote control robots for helicopters? Can a biped be taught to walk in a similar way as we learned our balancing and moving patterns? What is the functional connection between visual and tactile sensing? These are some questions which are addressed by the Rotob Lab.
Homepage: robotlab.itk.ppke.hu

==== Ányos Jedlik Research and Development Laboratory ====
The Jedlik Laboratories is a science-education-technology center where the advantages of multidisciplinary work is emphasized in emerging fields of science and technology. In the beginning the key areas were info-bionics and sensor-computing, telepresence and language technologies. Nano–bio technology, VLSI IC design are other areas of research.

Other topics of the center's research are life sciences, in particular the neurosciences, genetics and immunology as well as the field of nanoscale engineering and molecular bionics, nanoscale technologies, sensor-computing, telepresence, integrated communication and ad-hoc mobile networks, bio-compatible interfaces, as well as "smart" energ0y saving devices and integrated nano–micro systems.

The Jedlik Laboratories is organized within the Faculty of Information Technology in cooperation with the institutes of the Hungarian Academy of Sciences (HAS), namely the Computer and Automation Research Institute, the Research Institute for Experimental Medicine, the Neurobiology Research Unit at the Semmelweis University of Medicine of the HAS, the Research Institute of Technical Physics and Material Science, the Research Institute of Psychology, the Institute of Enzymology of the Biology Research Center of the HAS, the Richter Gedeon Co., the Ericsson Hungary Ltd., and a few SMEs. The cooperating international research laboratories are listed in the International relations section.
Homepage: Jedlik Laboratories

==== Biomicrofluidics Research Group ====
The Biomicrofluidics Research group works on the development of point-of-care (POC) diagnostic devices, optofluidic and digital microfluidic (DMF) platforms. This includes theory, numerical modeling, design, fabrication, test and different applications. Their main area of focus is microfluidic devices for biomedical applications.

The point-of-care diagnostic project focuses on the continuous observation and monitoring of biological liquids, e.g., veterinary or human blood samples.

The integration and interplay between optical and fluidic functionalities defines the emerging field of optofluidics. Microfluidics enables the realization of lab-on-a-chip (LOC) devices in connection with CNN-UM based camera systems. Thus, the obtained biomedical liquid analyzer can recognize cells and particles in the sample flow in real-time.

The Research Group's digital microfluidic (DMF) platform is based the electrowetting-on-dielectrics (EWOD) phenomenon; they are working on clinical applications of this. The biological fluid droplets can be moved by electric field on a superhydrophobic surface. Droplet mainulations allow for parallel and multi-reagent analysis.
Homepage: en.ufluidics.bionics.hu/

==== Research Centre for Competitive Law ====
It was established in 2006, at the Faculty of Law and Political Sciences. Its fields are organizing scientific conferences, publishing scientific papers, to spread the culture of competition.
Homepage (Hungarian): www.versenyjog.com

==== Syro-Hungarian archeological mission: margat excavations ====
The Syro-Hungarian Archeological mission is a research programme of the Pázmány Péter Catholic University. Its objective is to restore the Fortress of Margat, which is the largest crusader fortress of the Middle East, and to put under discussion the era of the crusades in the Middle East. The head of the mission is archeologist Balázs Major. The huge, 5.2-acre fortress is related to Hungary not only because of this expedition. In 1218 King Andrew II of Hungary visited the fortress protected by the Johannite Order and contributed an annual sum of 1000 silver marks for its upkeep. According to Balázs Major, "the most sensational discovery must be the mural found in the chapel." This is the largest crusader mural unearthed in the Holy Land, and it is unique from an iconographical aspect, as well.

==== Avicenna Institute of Middle Eastern Studies ====
The Avicenna Institute is a non-profit research center with the objectives of promoting scholarship in the field of Middle Eastern studies. In this framework, several senior and junior researchers and fellows are assuming and pursuing those aims. Among the projects are organizing public and international scientific workshops and conferences, publishing scientific monographs, conferences' proceedings, granting scholarship for junior researches. It has connections with Hungarian and international research centres, such as Pazmany Peter Catholic University, Saint Joseph University, Beirut and Università degli Studi di Napoli "L'Orientale".

The institute was founded to conduct research for an understanding of Arabic, Persian and Turkish cultures; to advise decision-makers, media-actors and businessmen interested in Middle-East issues; to disseminate knowledge on current topics in on-going public debates to avoid misunderstandings in intercultural dialogue.

The institute works on several projects:

- study the factors of continuity and discontinuity in Islamic legacy in the perspective of understanding the current development in the Islamic world, mainly in philosophy, theology, political sciences and literature, classical and modern,
- organizing public and international scientific workshops and conferences to disseminate knowledge,
- publishing scientific monographs, conferences' proceedings,
- granting scholarship for junior researches in PhD or post-doctoral dissertations.

== Notable people ==
=== Honorary doctors ===
- Max van der Stoel, the first High Commissioner on National Minorities of the Organization for Security and Co-operation in Europe (24 November 1999)
- Urbano Navarrete SJ, cardinal, professor of Canon Law and former rector of the Pontifical Gregorian University (2.May 2000))
- Paul Poupard, cardinal, former president of the Pontifical Council for Culture and also of the Pontifical Council for Interreligious Dialogue (1 March 2001)
- Bartholomew I, archbishop of Constantinople, Ecumenical Patriarch (25 April 2001)
- Franciszek Macharski, cardinal, former Archbishop of Kraków (22. September 2002.)
- Alfred Bayer, President of the Hanns Seidel Foundation (22. September 2002.)
- Astrik L. Gabriel O.Praem., Director of the Medieval Institute at the University of Notre Dame from 1952 to 1975 (2003.)
- Stephen Privett SJ, President of the University of San Francisco (2004.)
- James Crawford, Whewell Professor of International Law, Chair of the Faculty of Law at the University of Cambridge (21. January 2005.)
- Lorenzo Ornaghi, Rector of the Università Cattolica del Sacro Cuore (15. November 2005.)
- Gerardo Marín, Professor, Associate Provost of the University of San Francisco (2005.)
- László Szabó SJ, Professor Emeritus of the Saint Joseph University (2005.)
- John Lukacs, Professor of history (10 June 2009.)
- Oscar Andrés Rodríguez Maradiaga S.D.B., cardinal, Archbishop of Tegucigalpa, President of Caritas Internationalis (23. November 2009.)
- Zenon Grocholewski, cardinal, Prefect of the Congregation for Catholic Education and Great Chancellor of the Pontifical Gregorian University (12. May 2010.)
- Miklós Vető, Historian of Philosophy, Professor Emeritus of the University of Poitiers (15. December 2010.)
- José Tomás Martin de Agar, Professor of Canon Law at the Pontifical University of the Holy Cross (5. May 2011.)
- Bronisław Wenanty Zubert OFM, Professor of Canon Law at the John Paul II Catholic University of Lublin (5. May 2011.)
- Shenouda III, Pope of the Coptic Orthodox Church of Alexandria (19. August 2011.)
- Jean-Luc Marion, Professor, Head of the Department of Philosophy at the University of Paris IV (Sorbonne) (27. September 2011.)
- Wolfgang Waldstein, Professor of legal history, University of Innsbruck, member of the Pontifical Academy for Life (29. March 2012.)

=== Faculty and staff ===
- Kathleen E. Dubs, Old and Middle English, medieval literature scholar; her lectures on Tolkien revived interest in him in academic circles
- Tamás Freund, academician, neurobiologist, The Brain Prize laureate
- Ida Fröhlich, historian, made the first translation of the corpus of the Dead Sea Scrolls into Hungarian
- Rózsa Hoffmann, Secretary of State for Education
- András Jakab, Constitutional lawyer, Schumpeter Fellow at the Max Planck Institute for Comparative Public Law and International Law, fellow researcher at Centro de Estudios Políticos y Constitucionales (2008–2010)
- István Jelenits Sch.P., theologian, writer, Széchenyi Prize laureate
- János Lackfi, poet, writer, literary translator
- John Lukacs, historian, author of "Five Days in London", "May 1940" and "A New Republic"
- Balázs Major, Arabist, archeologist, historian, head of the Syro-Hungarian Archeological Mission, and the excavation of the Crusader Fortress of Margat
- Miklós Maróth, classical philologist, Arabist, academician, vice-president of the Hungarian Academy of Sciences, honorary president of the Union Académique Internationale
- Balázs Mezei, academician, philosopher, literary critic
- Thomas Molnar, philosopher, historian, political theorist, author of "Utopia, The Perennial Heresy" and "The Decline of the Intellectual"
- Péter Polt, Chief Prosecutor (2000–2006, 2010–)
- Gábor Proszéky, linguist, mathematician, CEO of MorphoLogic, International Dennis Gabor Award and Széchenyi Prize laureate
- András Radetzky, Deputy executive officer, Hungarian Catholic Radio (2011–)
- Tamás Roska GCSG, academician, co-founder of the Cellular neural network. He wrote more than 200 publications and four books, number of his references are about 3000.
- László Sólyom, President of Hungary (2005–2010), president of the Constitutional Court of Hungary (1990–1998)
- Szabolcs Szuromi, President of the Canon Law Institute "ad instar facultatis" (2006-2014), member of the Hungarian Higher Accreditation Committee's Plenum (2006-2011), doctor of the Hungarian Academy of Sciences, Rector of PPKE (2011-), President of the International Canon Law History Research Center (Budapest, 2013-), international highly recognized in the canon law history science
- Béla Weissmahr SJ, philosopher, theologian

=== Alumni ===
Pázmány alumni number 26,000.

- Tibor Benedek (2005) – Olympic, European and World champion waterpolo player
- Miklós Both (2008) – musician, composer, ethnographist
- Andrew (Andor) Fabinyi, Hungarian-born Australian publisher
- Gergely Gulyás (2004) – MP, deputy chairman, Committee for Human rights, Minorities, Civic and Religious Affairs of the Hungarian Parliament
- Péter Harrach (1995) – former deputy speaker of the Hungarian Parliament
- Edith Farkas (1921-1993), Hungarian-born New Zealand meteorologist who measured ozone levels
- Eszter Vitályos (1979-), Hungarian politician and lawyer, spokesperson of the Hungarian government
- Máté Kocsis (2004) – mayor, 8. District of Budapest
- András Koltay (2002) – member of the Media Council
- Karolina Kosztrihán – radio-host, ClassFM
- Tamás Gergely Kucsera (2000) – former presidential chief-adviser, Hungarian Academy of Sciences
- István Madarász – film director, "Hungary – World of Potentials"
- Péter Magyar (2004) – Prime Minister of Hungary (2026-), president of the Tisza Party
- László Mécs – alpinist, member of the first Hungarian team which managed to arrive on the top of the Mount Everest
- Tibor Méray – author, journalist
- György Pásztor – pharmacist, ice hockey player, and sports administrator
- Bence Rétvári (2003) – MP, Secretary of State, Ministry of Public Administration and Justice
- Atala Schöck (1998) – opera singer
- Zsolt Semjén (1997) – Deputy Prime Minister, Minister without portfolio
- Ádám Steinmetz (2006) – Olympic champion waterpolo player
- Barnabás Steinmetz (2005) – Olympic champion waterpolo player
- András Stumpf (2004) – journalist, Heti Válasz
- Gergő Süveges – anchorman, MTV
- Anett Szabó (2004) – anchorwoman, HírTV
- László Szollás (1907–1980) – world champion and Olympic medalist pair skater.
- László Székely-Mádai – ice-hockey player, FTC
- Ferenc Török – film director, "Moszkva tér"
