= Zoltán Kaszab =

Hungarian entomologist

Zoltán Kaszab (23 September 1915 – 4 April 1986) was a Hungarian entomologist and a specialist on the Tenebrionidae and Meloidae beetle families. He worked in the Hungarian Museum from 1950 and retired as its director.

Kaszab was born in Farmos and took an interest in nature early and after his secondary school he went to Pázmány Péter University, Budapest and studied chemistry. In 1937 he completed his doctorate in zoology-geology-mineralogy and worked with Endre Dudich and joined the Hungarian Museum as a volunteer working there until 1941. He then worked as a paid trainee until 1950 and became the head of the Coleoptera department in 1955 and General Director in 1970, retiring in 1986. He specialized in the Tenebrionidae and Meloidae and produced numerous descriptions and contributed to eight volumes on beetles in the Fauna of Hungary publications series. He also went on collection trips, particularly to Mongolia, heading six expeditions from 1963 to 1968. His collections made the Hungarian Museum one of the most important repositories for beetles in several groups. Apart from beetles he also collected numerous other taxa including reptiles and small mammals. Many genera and species (nearly 500 taxa in all) are named after him.

Kaszab described nearly 2800 species. His zoological author abbreviation is Kaszab.
