= List of private schools in Washington =

This lists private schools in the U.S. state of Washington. For a list of private schools in the U.S. capital Washington, D.C., see List of parochial and private schools in Washington, D.C.

This is a list of private schools in Washington. As of the 2011-2012 school year, there were 517 approved private schools in the state of Washington.

== Adams County ==
Othello

- Saddle Mountain School

Warden

- Warden Hutterian School

== Asotin County ==
Clarkston

- Holy Family School

== Benton County ==
Kennewick

- Bethlehem Lutheran School
- Calvary Christian School
- Northwest Education Academy
- Skylar Education Academy
- St. Joseph's School

Richland

- Children's Garden Montessori
- Christ the King School
- Liberty Christian School
- Sagebrush Elementary School

== Chelan County ==
Leavenworth

- Upper Valley Christian School

Wenatchee

- Cascade Christian Academy
- Garden City Academy
- Joyful Scholars Montessori School
- St. Joseph's School
- St. Paul's Lutheran School
- The River Academy

== Clallam County ==
Port Angeles

- Joyce Hope Academy
- Olympic Christian School
- Queen of Angels School

Sequim

- Five Acre School
- Peninsula Adventist Elementary School

== Clark County ==
Battle Ground

- Columbia Adventist Academy
- Cornerstone Christian Academy for Learning and Leadership
- Firm Foundation Christian School
- Meadow Glade Adventist School

Camas

- Pacific Crest Academy
- Spanish with Sarah
- Bright Futures Christian School

Ridgefield

- Cedar Tree Classical Christian School
- Mountain View Christian School

Vancouver

- Cascadia School
- Cornerstone Christian School
- Gardner School of Arts and Sciences
- Hosanna Christian School
- King's Way Christian School
- Our Lady of Lourdes School
- Seton Catholic College Preparatory High School
- Skinner Elementary Montessori School (formerly Skinner Montessori School) (2009)
- Slavic Christian Academy-Vancouver
- St. Joseph School

Washougal

- Riverside Christian School

== Cowlitz County ==
Kelso

- Family House Academy
- Kelso Longview Adventist School
- Three Rivers Christian School

Longview

- St. Rose School
- Three Rivers Christian School-Longview Elem

== Franklin County ==
Pasco

- Country Haven Academy
- Kingspoint Christian School
- St. Patrick School
- Tri-Cities Prep
- Tri-City Junior Academy

== Grant County ==
Ephrata

- New Life Christian School
- St. Rose of Lima School

Moses Lake

- Crestview Christian School
- Moses Lake Christian Academy

Quincy

- Quincy Valley School

Warden

- Marlin Hutterite School

== Grays Harbor County ==
Aberdeen

- St. Mary School

Montesano

- Grays Harbor Adventist Christian School

== Island County ==
Clinton

- Whidbey Island Waldorf School

Langley

- Island Christian Academy

Oak Harbor

- Der Kinderhuis Montessori
- Doodlebugs Academy
- North Whidbey Christian High
- Oak Harbor Christian School

== Jefferson County ==
Port Hadlock

- Cedarbrook Adventist Christian
- Sunfield Waldorf School

Port Townsend

- Jefferson Community School
- Swan School

== King County ==
Auburn

- Spring Academy
- Auburn Adventist Academy
- Buena Vista SDA School
- Green River Montessori School
- Holy Family School
- Rainier Christian Middle School
- Rainier Christian Elementary-Kent View
- Rainier Christian Preschool-Little People
- Valley Christian School
- Overcomer Academy

Bellevue

- Academic Institute
- America's Child Montessori
- Bellevue Children's Academy
- Bellevue Children's Academy 2nd Location
- Bellevue Montessori School
- Bel-Red Bilingual Academy
- BK Play Academy for Gifted Children
- Brightmont Academy
- Cedar Park Christian School
- Chestnut Hill Academy South Campus
- Dartmoor School
- Eastside Academy
- Eastside Christian School
- Eastside Learning Community
- Emerald Heights Academy
- Eton School
- Forest Ridge School of Sacred Heart
- French Immersion School of Washington
- Hillside Student Community School
- Jewish Day School
- Living Montessori Academy
- Newport Children's School
- Open Window School
- Shamrock Montessori
- St. Louise School
- St. Madeleine Sophie School
- The Eastside Montessori School
- The Little School
- Three Cedars Waldorf School

Bothell

- Cedar Park Christian School
- Evergreen Academy
- Heritage Christian Academy
- St. Brendan School
- The Clearwater School
- UCiC School
- Whole Earth Montessori School
- Woodinville Montessori School

Burien

- Glendale Lutheran School
- John F. Kennedy Catholic High School
- Praise Christian Academy
- St. Francis of Assisi School
- Three Tree Montessori

Clyde Hill

- Bellevue Christian School
- Sacred Heart School

Covington

- Kentwood Christian Academy
- Rainier Christian High School

Des Moines

- Evergreen Lutheran High School
- Holy Trinity Lutheran School
- Legacy Classical Christian Academy
- St. Philomena School

Duvall

- Hillside Academy

Enumclaw

- Cascade Independent High School
- Cedar River Academy

Federal Way

- Brooklake Christian School
- Christian Faith School
- Holy Innocents School of NW
- Spring Valley Montessori
- St. Vincent De Paul School

Issaquah

- Cougar Mountain Academy
- Dartmoor School—Issaquah
- Pacific Learning Academy
- Sammamish Christian School & Noah's Ark
- Snoqualmie Springs School
- St. Joseph Catholic School of Issaquah

Kenmore

- Veritas Academy

Kirkland

- Cedar Crest Academy
- Countryside Montessori School
- Eastside Preparatory School
- Holy Family Parish School
- Kirkland SDA School
- Puget Sound Adventist Academy

Lake Forest Park

- Sno-King Academy

Maple Valley

- Blossoming Hill Montessori

Medina

- Saint Thomas School
- Three Points Elementary

Mercer Island

- American Academy
- Child School
- ETC Preparatory Academy
- French American School of Puget Sound
- Northwest Yeshiva High School
- Privett Academy
- St. Monica School

North Bend

- North Bend Montessori Inc
- Spanish Academy
- Summit Classical Christian School

Redmond

- Cascadia Montessori School
- Faith Lutheran School of Redmond
- Medina Academy
- Montessori Children's House
- Overlake School
- Spectrum Academy
- The Bear Creek School
- The Sammamish Montessori School

Renton

- Cedar River Montessori School
- New Horizon School
- Northwest Free School
- Rainier Christian Schools-Maple Valley Elementary
- Rainier Christian Schools-Maple Valley Preschool
- Renton Christian School
- St. Anthony School

Sammamish

- Brightmont Academy
- Eastside Catholic School
- Eastside Montessori Education Foundation dba Arbor Schools
- TLC Academy

Seattle

- Academy for Precision Learning
- Alcuin School
- Amazing Grace Christian School
- Assumption St. Bridget
- Bertschi School
- Billings Middle School
- Bishop Blanchet High School
- Bright Water School
- Brightmont Academy
- Christ the King School
- Cristo Rey Jesuit Seattle High School
- Concordia Christian Academy
- Dartmoor School—Seattle
- Epiphany School
- Explorer West Middle School
- Fairview Christian School
- Family Academy/Academy NW
- First Place
- Giddens School
- Hamlin Robinson School
- Holy Family School
- Holy Names Academy
- Holy Rosary Elementary
- Hope Lutheran School
- Islamic School of Seattle
- Kapka Cooperative School
- Koinonia Learning Academy
- Lake Forest Park Montessori
- Lake WA Girls Middle School
- Lakeside School
- Laurel Academy
- Matheia School
- Meridian School
- MMSC Day School
- Morningside Academy
- Northwest Montessori
- Northwest School
- O'Dea High School
- Our Lady of Fatima School
- Our Lady of Guadalupe School
- Our Lady Of The Lake School
- Pacific Crest Schools
- Perkins School
- Puget Sound Community School
- Seattle Academy of Arts/Sciences
- Seattle Area German American School
- Seattle Christian School
- Seattle Country Day School
- Seattle Girls' School
- Seattle Hebrew Academy
- Seattle Jewish Community School
- Seattle Lutheran High School
- Seattle Prep/Matteo Ricci College
- Seattle Urban Academy
- Seattle Waldorf School
- Shoreline Christian School
- Shorewood Christian School
- Sound View Education
- Spring Academy
- Spruce Street School
- St. Alphonsus School
- St. Anne School
- St. Benedict School
- St. Bernadette School
- St. Catherine School
- St. Christopher Academy
- St. Edwards School
- St. George School
- St. John School
- St. Joseph School
- St. Matthew School
- St. Paul School
- St. Therese School
- The Bush School
- The Lake and Park School
- Tilden School
- Torah Day School of Seattle
- University Child Development School
- University Cooperative School
- University Preparatory
- Valley School
- Villa Academy
- West Seattle Montessori School
- Westside School
- Work It Out
- Zion Preparatory Academy

Shoreline

- The Evergreen School
- Horizon School
- King's Schools
- Living Wisdom School of Seattle
- Northwest School For Hearing Impaired
- Pacific Learning Center NW
- St. Luke School
- St. Mark School

Tukwila

- Academy Schools/Children’s Academy

Vashon

- Carpe Diem Primary School, Inc.
- Harbor School

Woodinville

- Bellevue Christian Mack Elementary
- Brock's Academy
- Chesterton Academy of St. Michael
- Chrysalis School
- Dartmoor School
- Dolan Academy & Learning Center
- Northwest Liberty School

== Kitsap County ==
Bainbridge Island

- Bellevue Christian Mack Elementary
- Brock's Academy
- Chrysalis School
- Dartmoor School
- Dolan Academy & Learning Center
- Northwest Liberty School

Bremerton

- Alta Vista School
- Christ the King Lutheran School
- Crosspoint Academy
- Discovery Depot Montessori
- Kitsap Adventist Christian School
- Our Lady Star of the Sea School
- Peace Lutheran School

Port Orchard

- Bethany Lutheran Elementary
- Burley Christian School
- Discovery Montessori
- South Kitsap Christian School

Poulsbo

- Gateway Christian Schools
- Martha & Mary Children's Learning Center
- Poulsbo SDA School
- Silverwood School
- West Sound Academy

== Kittitas County ==
Ellensburg

- Ellensburg Christian School

White Salmon

- Little Oak Montessori School

== Klickitat County ==
Goldendale

- Goldendale Christian School

== Lewis County ==
Centralia

- Cedar Valley Academy
- Centralia Christian
- Evergreen Academy of Arts & Sciences

Chehalis

- Lewis County Adventist School
- St. Joseph School

== Lincoln County ==
Edwall

- Christian Heritage School

Odessa

- Rock Creek Hutterite
- Stahlville School

Reardan

- Deep Creek Hutterian School

Spokane

- Countryside SDA Elementary

== Mason County ==
Shelton

- Mason County Christian School
- Mt. Olive Lutheran School
- Shelton Valley Christian School

== Okanogan County ==
Omak

- Hearts Gathered Waterfall School (Okanagan: ʔaluspuʔús skʷant sənm̓aʔm̓áyaʔtən)
- Omak Adventist Christian School

Oroville

- North Country Christian School

Riverside

- Log Church Christian School

Tonasket

- Peaceful Valley Christian School

Winthrop

- Methow Valley Community School

== Pierce County ==
Edgewood

- Skys The Limit Montessori
- Slavic Christian Academy

Fife

- All Saints School

Gig Harbor

- Gig Harbor Academy
- Harbor Christian Schools
- Harbor Montessori School
- Lighthouse Christian School
- St. Nicholas School

Graham

- Freedom Academy
- South Sound Christian Schools-New Hope Campus

Lakewood

- Lakewood Lutheran School
- St. Frances Cabrini School
- St. Mary's Episcopal School

Puyallup

- All Saints School
- Cascade Christian Junior High and High School
- Cascade Christian Schools
- Northwest Christian School

Tacoma

- Annie Wright Schools
- Bellarmine Preparatory School
- Cascade Christian Schools-Fredrickson Elementary
- Cascade Christian Schools-Tacoma Elementary
- Community Montessori
- Concordia Christian Academy
- Covenant High School
- Faith Lutheran School
- First Presbyterian Church School
- Holy Rosary School
- Imagination School of Education
- Life Christian School
- Mt. Rainier Lutheran High School
- Parkland Lutheran School
- Puget Sound Christian School
- Seabury School
- Seabury School—Middle School Campus
- Slavic Christian Academy—Tacoma
- South Sound Christian Schools-Tacoma Baptist Campus
- St. Charles Borromeo School
- St. Mary's Academy
- St. Patrick School
- Tacoma Waldorf School
- Visitation School

University Place

- Charles Wright Academy
- Heritage Christian School

== San Juan County ==
Eastsound

- Orcas Christian School
- Salmonberry School

Friday Harbor

- Spring Street International School
- Stillpoint School

== Skagit County ==
Burlington

- Skagit Adventist Academy

Mount Vernon

- Immaculate Conception Regional School
- Mount Vernon Christian School
- Foothills Christian School

== Snohomish County ==
Arlington

- Academy NW/Family Academy
- Arlington Christian School
- Highland Christian Schools

Bothell

- Light of Faith Christian Academy

Edmonds

- Crescendo Artistic Environment
- Holy Rosary
- Solomon Christian School
- Stella Maris Academy

Everett

- Archbishop Thomas J. Murphy High School
- Calvary Christian Academy
- Cedar Park Christian School
- Everett Christian School
- Forest Park Adventist School
- Greater Trinity Christian Learning Academy
- Immaculate Conception/Our Lady of Perpetual Help
- Montessori Schools of Snohomish Co.
- Northshore Christian Academy
- St. Mary Magdalen School

Lake Stevens

- Hillcrest Academy
- Zion Lutheran School

Lynnwood

- Brighton School
- Cedar Park Christian School
- Cypress Adventist School
- Providence Classical Christian School
- Redemption Lutheran School (K-8)
- The Soundview School
- St. Thomas More School

Marysville

- Grace Academy

Monroe

- Cornerstone Academy
- Monroe Christian School
- Monroe Montessori School
- Theresa and Elizabeths School

Mountlake Terrace

- Cedar Park Christian School
- St. Pius X School

Mukilteo

- Mukilteo Academy
- Providence Christian School

Snohomish

- Lakeview Academy
- Peaceful Glen Christian School
- St. Michael Catholic School

Stanwood

- Cedarhome Adventist Christian School
- Summit Academy

== Spokane County ==
Colbert

- Northwest Christian School

Mead

- Faith Christian School

Newman Lake

- Shamrock Educational Academy

Spangle

- Upper Columbia Academy
- Upper Columbia Academy Elementary

Spokane

- All Saints Catholic School
- Assumption School
- Calvary Chapel Christian School
- Can Learn Academy
- Cataldo School
- Cornerstone Christian Academy
- First Presbyterian Christian School
- Gonzaga Preparatory School
- North Wall Elementary
- Northwest Christian School
- Palisades Christian Academy
- River Day School
- Saint George's School
- Slavic Christian Academy—Spokane
- Southside Christian School
- Spokane Christian Academy
- St. Aloysius Catholic School
- St. Charles School
- St. Matthew Lutheran School
- Saint Michael's Academy
- St. Patrick Catholic School
- St. Thomas More School
- Trinity Catholic School
- Westgate Christian School

Spokane Valley

- Pioneer School
- Prism School
- Spokane Valley Adventist School
- St. John Vianney School
- St. Mary's Catholic School
- The Oaks Classical Christian Academy
- Valley Christian School

== Stevens County ==
Colville

- Colville Valley Junior Academy
- Johnson Christian School

== Thurston County ==
Lacey

- Community Christian Academy
- Faith Lutheran School
- Holy Family School
- Northwest Christian High School
- Pope John Paul II High School

Olympia

- Cornerstone Christian School
- Evergreen Christian School
- Gospel Outreach
- Nova School
- Olympia Christian School
- Olympia Community School
- Olympia Waldorf School
- Rising Tide School
- St. Michael School
- Sunrise Beach School
- The Children's Inn Academy

Tumwater

- Serendipity Academy at the Lodge

Yelm

- Eagle View Christian School

== Walla Walla County ==
College Place

- Rogers Adventist School
- Walla Walla Valley Academy

Walla Walla

- Assumption Grade School
- DeSales Catholic School
- Liberty Christian School
- St. Basil Academy of Classical Studies

== Whatcom County ==
Bellingham

- Assumption Catholic School
- Baker View Christian School
- Bellingham Christian School
- Bridgeway Christian Academy
- Cascades Montessori Middle School
- Cedar Tree Montessori
- Explorations Academy/Global Community Institute
- Gardenview Montessori
- Home Port Learning Center
- Khalsa Academy
- Lynden Christian Schools - Evergreen campus
- Montessori at Samish Woods
- St. Paul's Academy
- WellSpring Community School
- Whatcom Day Academy
- Whatcom Hills Waldorf

Ferndale

- Pioneer Meadows Montessori School
- Providence Christian School Northwest

Lynden

- Cornerstone Christian School
- Covenant Christian School
- Ebenezer Christian School
- Lynden Christian Schools

Sedro-Wooley

- Alger Learning Center

== Whitman County ==
Colton

- Guardian Angel St. Boniface School

Pullman

- Pullman Christian School
- Royal Garrison School

== Yakima County ==
Grandview

- Grandview Adventist Junior Academy

Harrah

- Harrah Community Christian School

Naches

- Nile Christian School/Hope Academy

Selah

- Selah Covenant Christian School

Sunnyside

- Sunnyside Christian School
- Trinity Reformed Christian School

Union Gap

- La Salle High School

Yakima

- Grace Lutheran School
- Green Pastures Learning Center
- Montessori School of Yakima
- Oakridge Ranch - Montessori Farm School
- Riverside Christian School
- St. John of Kronstadt Orthodox Christian School
- St. Joseph Marquette Middle School
- Saint Paul Cathedral School
- Westpark Christian Academy
- Yakima Adventist Christian School

Zillah

- Christian Worship Center Elementary
