= Saint Thomas School =

St. Thomas School
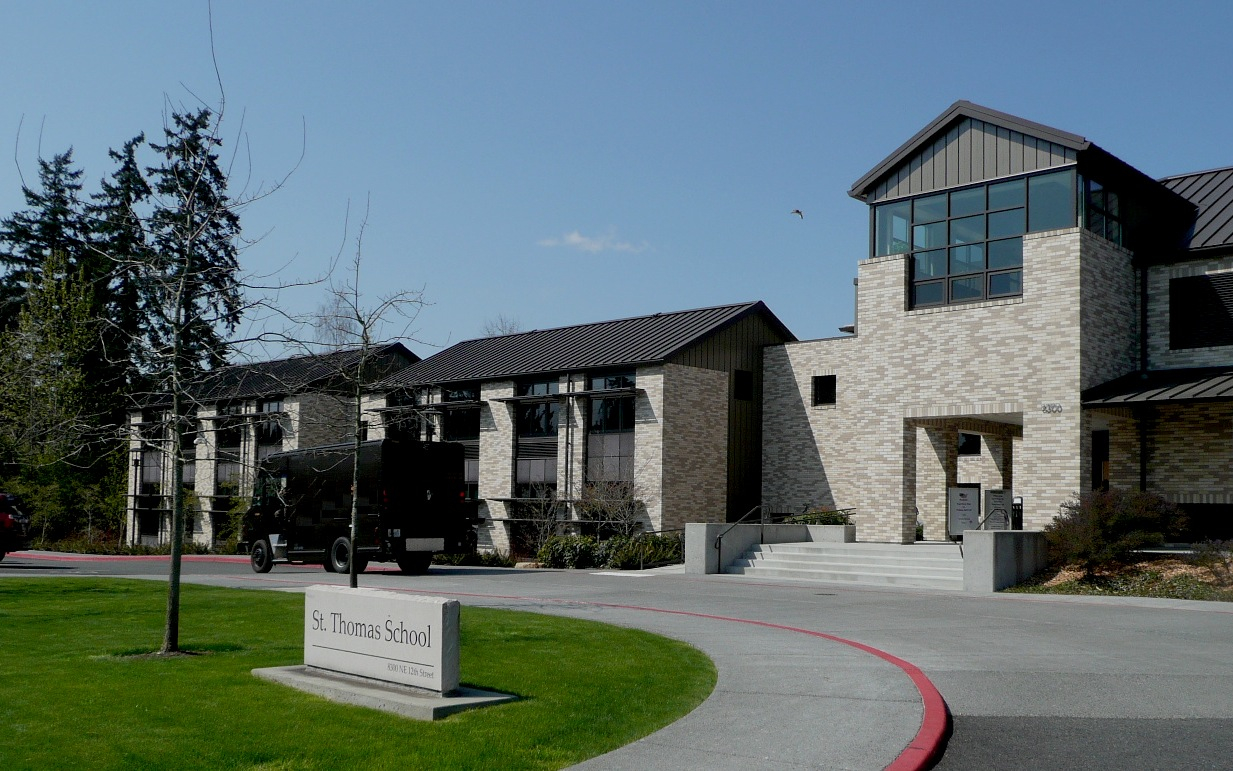

Location
- 8300 NE 12th Street; Medina, Washington; United States; 47°37′18″N 122°13′48″W

Information
- Type: Independent school
- Motto: Where Young Minds Grow
- Established: 1951
- Principal: Peter Lutkoski
- Grades: pre-school – eighth grade
- Enrollment: 360 (As of 2019)
- Campus: Suburban
- Colors: Dark Green and White
- Mascot: falcon
- Website: stthomasschool.org

St. Thomas School is an independent school in Medina, an Eastside suburb of Seattle, Washington, United States.

== Description ==
St. Thomas School provides early childhood, pre-primary, and primary education for students from 2 ½ years of age through to the eighth grade. It has a close relationship with, but is independent from, the adjacent St. Thomas Episcopal Church and is a member of the National Association of Episcopal Schools, the National Association of Independent Schools the Northwest Accreditation Commission, the Pacific Northwest Association of Independent Schools and the Washington Federation of Independent Schools.

== Programs ==
- Athletics
- Chapel and Character
- Clubs
- Early Learning Center
- Elementary Center
- Extended Day
- Falcon's Ledge
- Fine Arts
- Foreign Language
- Library and Media Center
- Middle School
- Service Learning
- Technology

== History ==
St. Thomas School began in 1951 as St. Thomas Day School, a parish school of St. Thomas (Episcopal) Church, and was located across the street from the church. In 1954, the first permanent school buildings were constructed on the current site. In 1968, the school became fully independent of the church. Various expansions occurred until 2008 when the school buildings were demolished and replaced with a new facility designed by Bassetti Architects.

== Facilities ==
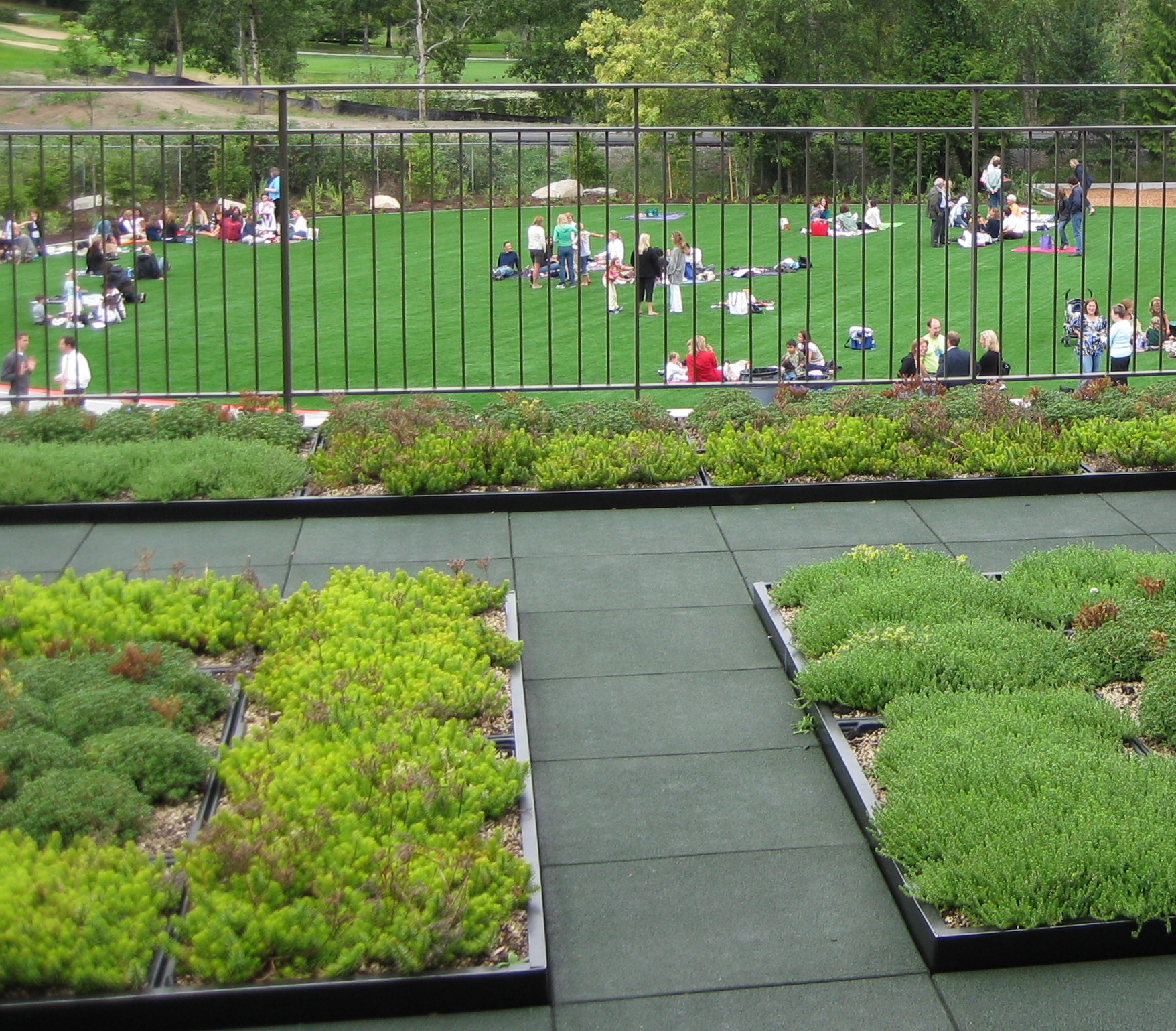
Planted balcony, accessible to teachers and students, with school's private playground in background

The school shares a campus with St. Thomas Episcopal Church. The two facilities are adjacent but not connected. The public facades of the school are designed to reflect the more formal, rectangular, stone-clad character of the adjacent church. The facades that face the playground are more informal, free-form, and brightly colored.

Three of the school's four wings (two each on two floors) are for a different age group, with classrooms opening off of common activity areas for group learning, tutoring, project-based learning, and individual instruction. The fourth wing houses the library and specialist classrooms (music, art, Spanish, etc.). The building includes a science lab, technology center, media publishing lab, library/multi-media center, a dedicated foreign language classroom, music room, and exterior covered plazas for play and outdoor learning.

== Sustainable Features ==
The school facilities are notable for their sustainable features.

LEED Gold: The new building was Washington State's first to receive Gold certification by the US Green Building Council's Leadership in Energy and Environmental Design program under the LEED for Schools Rating System.

Energy Star: The facility received an Energy Star design rating that indicates 30 percent less energy usage than a typical school of this size. Carbon dioxide emissions are reduced by approximately 130 tons per year.

Due to the successful efforts of students to introduce food recycling and reduce food waste (with use of composting), STS has been certified as a Washington Area Green School.
