= Eastside Catholic School =

Location
- 232 228th Avenue SE; Sammamish, Washington; United States; 47°36′25″N 122°01′33″W

Information
- Type: Private, coeducational secondary school
- Religious affiliation: Roman Catholic
- Established: 1980
- CEEB code: 480067
- President: Gil Picciotto
- Dean: Keri Greenheck, Dominic Daste
- Principal: Soonja Larsen (High School); Ashley Hylton (Middle School)
- Teaching staff: 74.5 (FTE) (2019–20)
- Grades: 6–12
- Enrollment: 862 (2019–20)
- Average class size: 19
- Student to teacher ratio: 11.6 (2019–20)
- Campus size: 50 acres (20 ha)
- Campus type: Suburban
- Colors: Orange, Navy Blue
- Fight song: Catch the Spirit; Eastside Catholic (Mighty Oregon)
- Athletics: WIAA
- Athletics conference: Metro 3A
- Sports: Football, Volleyball, Baseball, Track and Field, Flag Football, Cross Country, Fastpitch, Basketball, Lacrosse, Swimming, Wrestling, Special Olympics Bowling and Tennis.
- Mascot: Crusader
- Nickname: "EC" "Eastside Catholic"
- Team name: Crusaders
- Rival: O'Dea High School
- Accreditation: Northwest Association of Independent Schools, Northwest Accreditation Commission,
- Newspaper: Eastside Catholic School Newspaper
- Tuition: $32,750
- Affiliation: National Association of Independent Schools (NAIS), National Catholic Educational Association (NCEA), Northwest Association of Independent Schools (NWAIS), Office of the Superintendent of Public Instruction (OSPI), Washington Federation of Independent Schools (WFIS)
- Alumni: 4,600+
- Website: eastsidecatholic.org

Eastside Catholic School is a private Roman Catholic secondary school located in Sammamish, Washington, a suburb east of Seattle within the Archdiocese of Seattle. It has a faith-based educational program for students in grades 6 through 12.

== Description ==
Founded by parents in 1980, the school is governed by an elected board of trustees. It is accredited by the state of Washington, the Northwest Association of Independent Schools. It is a member of the National Catholic Educational Association and the Washington Federation of Independent Schools (WFIS). Eastside Catholic consists of a middle school, grades 6–8, with 235 students, and a high school, grades 9–12, with approximately 800 students. The athletics mascot is the Crusader and the school colors are orange and navy blue. Eastside Catholic also offers an integrated special education program for high school students, the Options Program.

== History ==
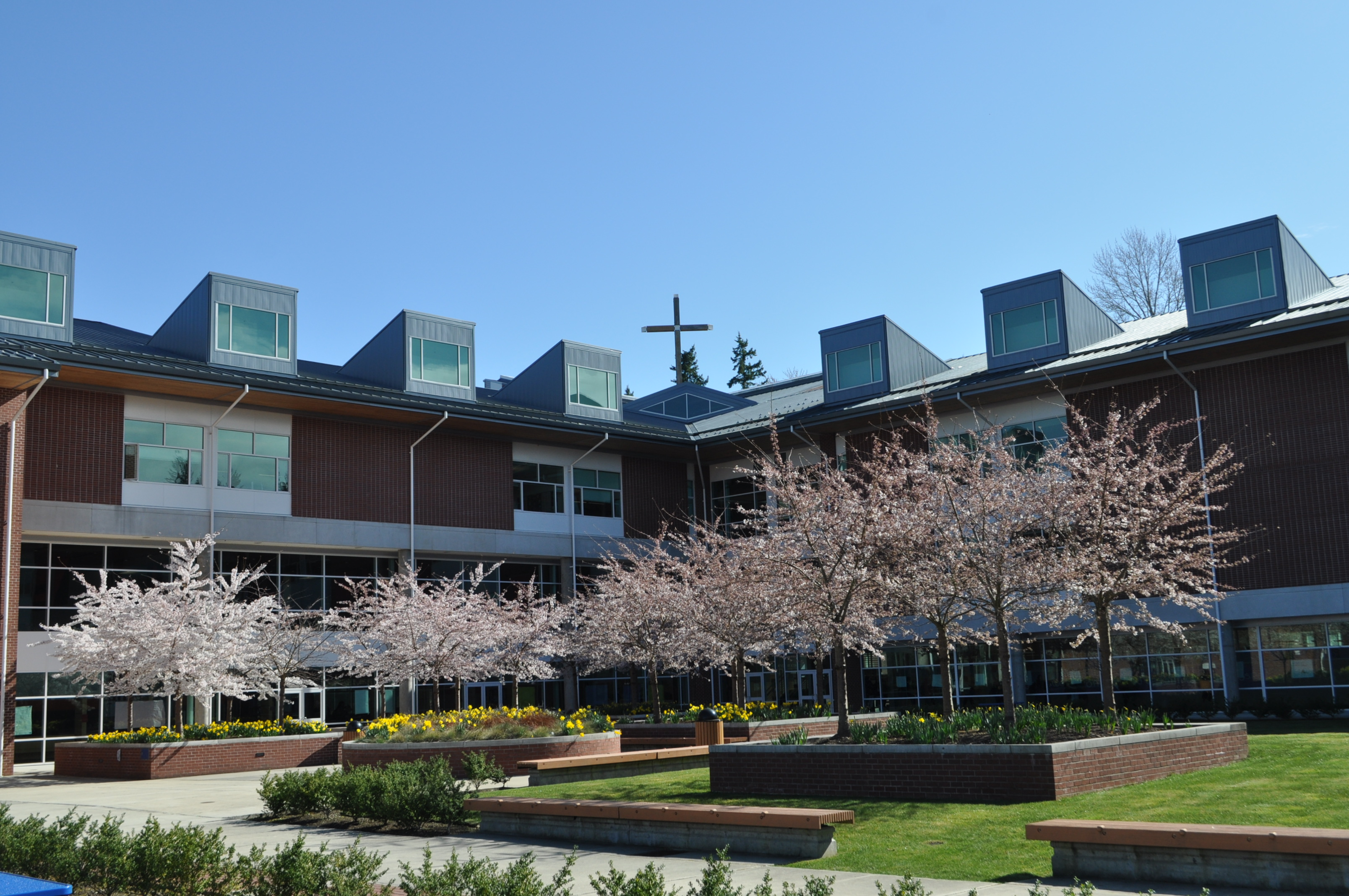
Eastside Catholic campus in spring

For the first nine years, the campus was south of the Bellevue Square mall, at the former Bellevue Junior High School (old Bellevue High), which is now the Downtown Park.

The next campus was also rented from the Bellevue School District at the former Ringdall Junior High (1970–87) at 11650 SE 60th Street in Newport Hills. Classes were held at that campus from 1981 to June 2008. In August 2008, Eastside Catholic opened a new $42 million campus in the city of Sammamish. The school also included an expansion to include grades 6–8. The Sammamish campus features a chapel and 2,000 seat athletics stadium.

== Scandals ==
The school made headlines when the resignation of vice-principal Mark Zmuda was announced in December 2013. Zmuda said he had been fired. Media reports said he was asked to resign because of his same-sex marriage in summer 2013. Over 400 students conducted a sit-in protest in his support, with many teachers supporting the protest as well. The school stated in a letter to parents that "Mark's same-sex marriage over the summer violated his employment contract with the school" and that the school had been "directed to comply with the teachings of the church". Though many at the school advocated retaining Zmuda, the Archdiocese of Seattle maintained that Zmuda either needed to be terminated or the school would lose its credential as a Catholic institution.

In response to the student protest, the school administration stated that students would be sent home for any additional campus protests. This failed to quell the controversy, and on January 22, 2014, the president of the school, Sister Mary Tracy, resigned. The school board of trustees accepted her resignation, saying, "For Sister Mary it was a difficult but necessary decision so that a new leader can be brought in to ensure the entire Eastside Catholic community is on a positive path forward."

In August 2017, the school underwent another major disruption of its leadership. The overall principal of the school and the principal of the middle school were both dismissed, and 13 other faculty members resigned in response. Amid the dispute, an online petition was established that collected more than 400 signatures, calling for the dismissals to be reversed. The school's interim president, Father William Heric, and the two co-chairs of the board of trustees were reported to have fired the principals without the permission of the rest of the board of trustees. The two trustees who were blamed for the action then resigned and the board of trustees removed Heric from the position of interim president. Heric was also removed from his position as school chaplain and relocated to another Catholic church in the Seattle area. However, the school's baseball field still bears his name. The dismissed principals and other faculty members were invited to return. The turmoil resulted in the school being unable to open on time for its fall session, so the start of classes was delayed by a week.

=== Sporting Championships ===
Eastside Catholic has won eleven state titles from 1984 to 2018: The cheerleading team has won various UCA national and world titles.

- 1984: Girls Cross Country
- 2010: Division II Girls Lacrosse
- 2014: 3A Football
- 2015: 3A Football
- 2016: Cheerleading Non-Tumbling
- 2016: Girls' Lacrosse
- 2017: Cheerleading Non-Tumbling
- 2017: Girls' Lacrosse
- 2017: Boys' Lacrosse – Private School
- 2018: 3A Football
- 2018: Cheerleading Non-Tumbling
- 2019: 3A Football
- 2019: Cheerleading Non-Tumbling
- 2024: 3A Basketball

== Notable alumni ==
- Justin Armbruester, pitcher in the New York Mets organization
- Matt Boyd, MLB pitcher for the Chicago Cubs
- Hunter Bryant, NFL player formerly for the Detroit Lions
- Nolan Hickman, NBA G League player for the Capital City Go-Go
- Sophia Hutchins, American socialite
- Ethan O'Brien, professional soccer player
- Josh O'Brien, professional soccer player
- DJ Rogers, college football tight end for the TCU Horned Frogs
- Gee Scott Jr., UFL tight end for the Columbus Aviators, played college football at Ohio State.
- Cal Towey, MLB player formerly for the Miami Marlins.
- Matisse Thybulle, NBA player for the Portland Trail Blazers
- JT Tuimoloau, NFL defensive end for the Indianapolis Colts
