= Sage Ridge School =

Location
- 2515 Crossbow Court; Reno, Nevada 89511; United States; 39.40909°N 119.79953°W

Information
- School type: Private; independent; college-preparatory; day
- Motto: "Ask Our Graduates" and "Join Us"
- Religious affiliation: Nonsectarian
- Established: 1998; 28 years ago
- CEEB code: 290176
- NCES School ID: A9902792
- Headmaster: Bill Delbrugge
- Faculty: 30.5
- Grades: 1-12
- Gender: Co-educational
- Enrollment: 224 (2023–2024)
- Student to teacher ratio: 7.3:1
- Campus size: 40 acres (0 km^{2})
- Campus type: Suburban
- Colors: Maroon; Black; White
- Nickname: Scorpions
- Newspaper: The Ridge
- Affiliations: NAIS
- Website: sageridge.org

Sage Ridge School is a private, co-educational, college-preparatory school located in Reno, Nevada. Founded in 1998, the school serves students from Kindergarten through grade 12.

The school emphasizes small class sizes, a rigorous curriculum, and an educational framework including five core pillars: Scholarship, Respect, Integrity, Courage, and Community. Academic and extracurricular offerings include outdoor education programs, the arts, athletics, and a senior capstone thesis project with an internship component.

== History ==
=== Founding ===
Sage Ridge School was conceived in 1996 by a group of families in the Reno–Tahoe area who sought to establish an independent school as an alternative to boarding school options elsewhere.

The school was established in 1998 on a 40-acre campus in the Mount Rose foothills of the Sierra Nevada mountains, on land donated by the Nell J. Redfield Foundation.

Sage Ridge School is accredited by the Northwest Association of Independent Schools (NWAIS), an independent school accrediting body in the western United States.

=== Expansion ===
The school initially offered grades 6 through 8, then gradually added grades: grade 5 in 2005, grade 4 in 2016, grade 3 in 2019, and grades 1 and 2 in 2026. The school is organized into three divisions: Lower School, Middle School, and Upper School.

In 2023, the school opened the 24,000-square-foot E.L. Wiegand Student Activity Center.

In 2026, the school added grades 1 and 2.

== Academics ==
=== Curriculum ===
The curriculum follows a college-preparatory liberal arts program covering humanities, mathematics, sciences, world languages, engineering, and the arts.

Upper School students may take honors and advanced courses across multiple disciplines and choose from a range of electives, including computer science, engineering, literature, economics, environmental science, and the performing arts.

=== Classics ===
Sage Ridge includes a Classics program in its curriculum. Latin instruction is required for all students and includes grammar, translation, Roman history, rhetoric, and literature. At the upper levels, students study Ancient Greek and read classical texts such as Virgil's Aeneid in the original Latin. Students may also participate in the National Junior Classical League (NJCL).

=== Outdoor education ===
The school operates an outdoor education program drawing on the geography of the Sierra Nevada and the Great Basin. Students participate in week-long, grade-level trips that may include backpacking, hiking, rock climbing, kayaking, and ecological field study.

=== Test scores ===
Students at Sage Ridge participate in standardized testing including the SAT and ACT. The Class of 2026's average combined SAT score was 1356, and its average combined ACT score was 30.8.

=== Grade levels ===
Sage Ridge serves students in Kindergarten up to grade 12, through its Lower School (grades 1–5), Middle School (grades 6–8), and Upper School (grades 9–12) divisions. The school reports a student-to-teacher ratio of 7:1.

== Campus and facilities ==
Sage Ridge School sits on over 40 acres of land, about 1,000 feet above Reno's valley floor, directly south of the city. Three buildings—the Webster Building, the Crossbow Building, and the E.L. Wiegand Student Activity Center—and a learning cottage comprise the main campus, along with a multipurpose field behind the school.

The first phase of a multi-phase campus expansion, the 24,000-square-foot E.L. Wiegand Student Activity Center with the 13,000-square-foot Ernest J. Primm Gymnasium at its core, opened for the 2023–2024 winter sports season. Planned future phases include an innovation center and a performing arts theater.

== Athletics ==
The school competes in the 1A-3A divisions of the Northern Region NIAA. The school offers a variety of sports, including volleyball, cross country, swimming, golf, basketball, and track and field.

The boys' cross-country team won the 2A state championships in 2004, 2006, and 2007, and was runner-up in 2003, 2005, and 2011. The girls' cross-country team won the 2A state championships in 2007 and 2008, and was runner-up in 2006 and 2009.

In 2007, student Nathan Chellman set a state record in the 800-meter event at the Nevada NIAA Outdoor State Championships.

== Extracurricular activities ==
=== Theater ===
The drama department has presented plays and musicals including The Mousetrap, Guys and Dolls, A Streetcar Named Desire, Chekhov's The Boor and The Seagull, Little Shop of Horrors, Macbeth, Oliver!, Romeo and Juliet, The Crucible, The Taming of the Shrew and Battle Born. The school's theatre club performed an original play, Nevada: It Ain't Just About Vegas, Baby!, co-written by students and staff, at the Edinburgh Festival Fringe in 2014.

=== Speech and debate ===
Students compete in local tournaments hosted by the National Speech and Debate Association.

=== Junior Classical League ===
Sage Ridge is a chapter of the Nevada Junior Classical League, along with three other schools in Nevada; membership is open to students in grades 7–12 enrolled in a full-year Latin or Greek course.

=== Clubs ===
Every student must participate in at least one club each year. Clubs include Yearbook, Junior Classical League, Debate, FIRST Robotics, American Mathematics Competitions, Bridge, Art, She's the First, Astronomy, and Military History.

== Student organizations ==
Student organizations interact with one another and communicate with Sage Ridge students to create school policies.

- Prefecture — a teacher-elected group of students that maintains communication between students and faculty
- Honor Council — an organization consisting of a teacher-nominated, student-elected body
- Student Government — student-elected representatives

== Publications ==
- Vestigia — yearbook
