= The Soundview School =

Coordinates: 47°49′19″N 122°19′19″W

Soundview School
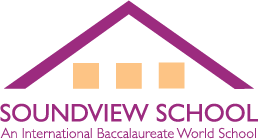

Location
- 6515 196th Street SW; Lynnwood, Washington 98036; United States

Information
- Type: Independent, Day school
- Established: 1996
- Head of School: Chrissy Sinclair
- Faculty: 29
- Grades: Preschool - 8th Grade
- Enrollment: approximately 85 students
- Campus: Suburban
- Campus size: 3+ acres
- Color: purple gold
- Mascot: Dolphin
- Information: (425) 778-8572
- Website: http://www.soundview.org/

Soundview School is an independent school in Snohomish County, Washington serving children from Preschool through 8th grade. Soundview School is located on a 3+-acre campus in suburban Lynnwood, Washington, just north of Edmonds College. Soundview offers the International Baccalaureate (IB) Middle Years Programme and is a candidate for the IB Primary Years Programme.

== History ==
=== 1996-2012 ===
In 1996, Inae Piercy founded Soundview School to provide education for her young son and other children in the community. The previous school (The Stein School) had closed, and Ms. Piercy took to rebuilding a new school with a new campus. Ms. Piercy built and ran Soundview School for seventeen years.

A sample of achievements:

- In 1997, the lower school campus was developed on a new parcel of land.
- In 1998, the Performing Arts Center was built as the school's centerpiece to support art and music.
- In 2002, Soundview School was converted to a 501c3 nonprofit independent school to encourage community support and a long future.
- In 2007, Soundview School adopted the International Baccalaureate curriculum, a rigorous world-recognized standard in education.
- In 2009, Soundview's Middle School was authorized by the International Baccalaureate Organization (IBO) to be an International Baccalaureate (IB) World School.
- In 2009-10, the Positive Discipline Model was incorporated into the school's curricular framework to support the IB Programme.
- In 2010-11, the Critical Thinking Model was incorporated into the school's curricular framework to further support the mission of the IB Programme.
- In 2013, Chris Watson took over as head of school and continues in the effort to make Soundview as great of a school as it can be.

== Students ==
Students that have graduated from Soundview School have gone to high schools such as Edmonds Woodway, Eastside Preparatory School, University Prep, Meadowdale, Lynnwood High School, Archbishop Murphy High School, Lakeside, and Kamiak. After high school Soundview students have gone on to study architecture, music, engineering, journalism, basic army training, art, language, etc.

The student teacher ratio is between 18:1 and 4:1 depending on the class. The number of students in preschool has decreased over the years, but the number of grades has increased. The junior kindergarten through 3rd grade usually has somewhere between 10 and 30 students every year.

== Sustainability ==
Soundview School started being more environmentally sustainable about 4 to 5 years ago. The school has taken actions such as composting food with worms, using Google docs instead of wasting paper, and having a special lunch program. The school is partnering with Full Circle Farms to provide a healthy lunch.

The 4th and 5th grade focus on environments and energy with a visit to IslandWood, the 6th, 7th, and 8th grade attends the North Cascades Mountain School in Diablo. The school also has a garden for growing food and units of inquiry focused on the systems in place for growing, processing, and transporting food around the world.

== Accreditation ==
Soundview School is:

- An International Baccalaureate World School, authorized to offer the Primary and Middle Years Programmes
- An NWAIS Candidate School
- Approved by the Washington State Board of Education
