= Eastside Preparatory School =

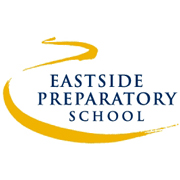

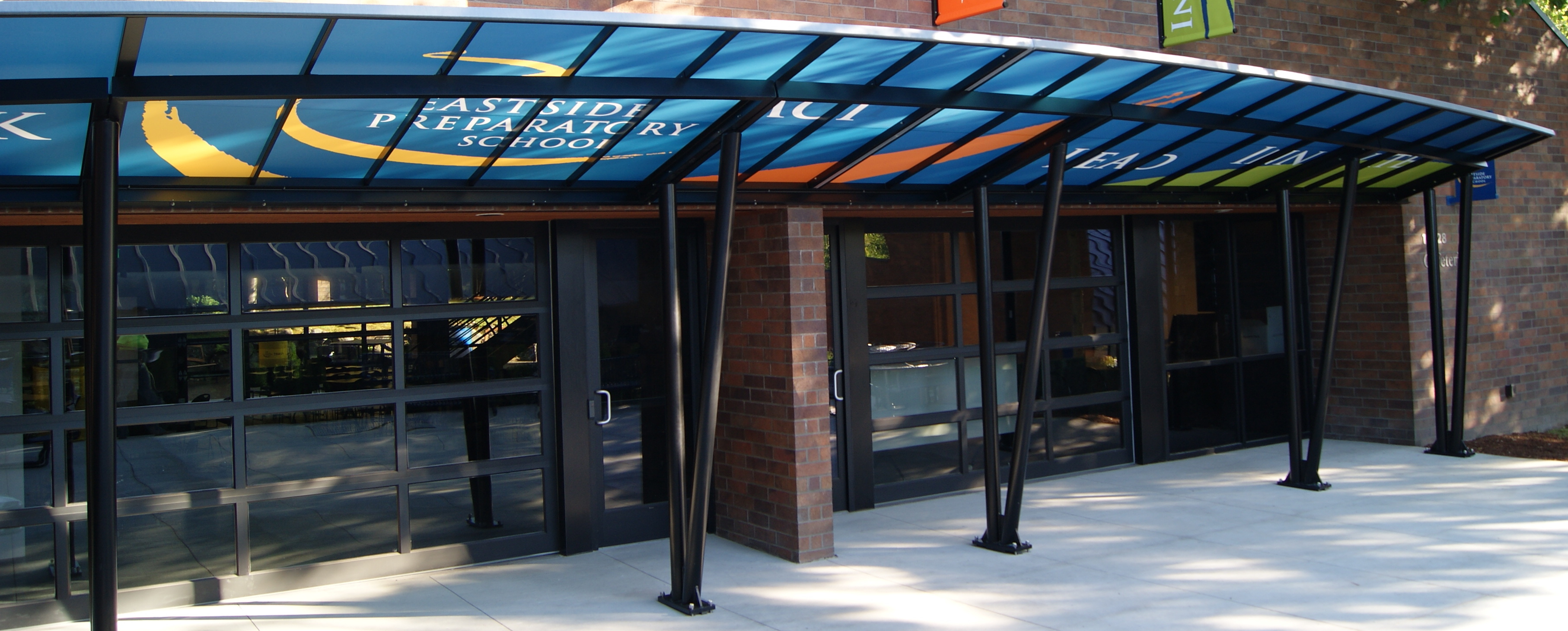

Location
- 10613 NE 38th Place; Kirkland, Washington 98033; United States; 47°38′36″N 122°11′54″W

Information
- Type: Independent college-preparatory school
- Motto: Think critically. Act responsibly. Lead compassionately. Innovate wisely.
- Founded: 2002; 24 years ago
- Head of school: Sam Uzwack
- Faculty: 63; 49.8 (FTE) (2017–18)
- Grades: 5–12
- Gender: Coed
- Average class size: 16
- Student to teacher ratio: 8.7:1 (2017–18)
- Hours in school day: 8:30–3:00
- Campus type: Suburban
- Colors: Gold; Navy blue
- Mascot: Edgar the Eagle
- Nickname: EPS
- Team name: Eastside Prep Eagles
- Accreditation: NWAIS, NAIS, State of Washington OSPI
- Website: www.eastsideprep.org

Eastside Preparatory School is an independent school for upper and middle school students. It is located in Kirkland, Washington, US. It is a secular, coed, college-preparatory school for grades 5–12. The Head of School is Mr. Sam Uzwack.

== History ==
Eastside Prep was founded in May 2002 by a group of parents and educators seeking more school choice, with a focus on interdisciplinary work and strategic thinking. Dr. Terry Macaluso, previously Head of School at Lakeside School, was a consultant to the founders and subsequently became the Head of School at Eastside Prep. The school opened its doors in September 2003 with 16 students in grades 6 and 7, along with 3 full-time and 1 part-time faculty. Eastside Prep graduated its first class of students in 2009.

In fall of 2015, Eastside Prep expanded, completing the construction of a new 4 story building (The Macaluso Academic Collaborative) that includes a gym, science labs, a design lab, an amphitheater and several multi-purpose classrooms. In fall of 2018 TALI Hall opened; a 50,000 square foot building housing a 500+-seat theatre, art studios, a set shop, instrumental and choral music rooms, science labs, general purpose classrooms and administrative offices.

== Academics ==
Eastside Preparatory School is accredited by the Northwest Association of Independent Schools, (NWAIS, formerly PNAIS). It is also a member of the National Association of Independent Schools and recognized by the Washington State Office of Superintendent of Public Instruction.

In addition to all courses required by the Washington State Graduation Requirements, Eastside Prep offers a multi-year Spanish curriculum, numerous core options and electives in the English, History, Social Sciences, Fine and Performing Arts, Mathematics, Sciences, Environmental Practices, Technology, Information Literacy and Media.

Afternoon activities at Eastside prep include teams for Math, Debate and FIRST Tech Challenge Robotics, as well as over twenty-five other student-driven clubs.

Eastside Prep dedicates multiple days every year to Service Learning.

== Robotics ==
Eastside Preparatory School has multiple robotics teams, in two separate leagues: FIRST Lego League Challenge for middle school students, and FIRST Tech Challenge (FTC) for students in 7th grade or higher. They have three FTC teams, a varsity team named Void Robotics, a varsity team named Null Robotics, and a junior varsity team named Undefined Robotics.

Null Robotics has won multiple awards. During the 2017–2018 season they most notably won the PTC Design Award. They won Tesla Interleague in 2018.

All three teams design and machine their own parts through methods such as 3D Printing and CNC Machining in the Sanders Design Lab, the schools dedicated makerspace.

== Athletics ==
In addition to Physical Education courses, Eastside Prep offers a number of afternoon sports. In 2012 the Eastside Prep Eagles opted up to the Emerald City League 1A athletic conference competing against other prep schools. In their league are The Bush School, The Overlake School, Seattle Academy of Arts and Sciences, University Prep, Northwest School, the Annie Wright School and the Forest Ridge School of the Sacred Heart.

Fall sports offered include Coed Crew (7th–12th), MS Boys Soccer (5th-8th), MS Girls Soccer (5th–8th), MS Coed Cross Country, MS Girls Volleyball, US Girls Volleyball, US Boys Ultimate Frisbee.

Winter sports offered include 5th Grade Coed Basketball, MS Boys Basketball (6th–8th), MS Girls Basketball (6th–8th), US Boys Basketball, US Girls Basketball, Seasonal Ski Bus.

Spring sports include Coed Crew (7th–12th), MS Co-Ed Track and Field, MS Coed Ultimate Frisbee, MS Coed Tennis, US Co-Ed Track and Field, US Girls Ultimate Frisbee, US Boys Soccer.
