= George Hofstetter =

American entrepreneur (born 2000)

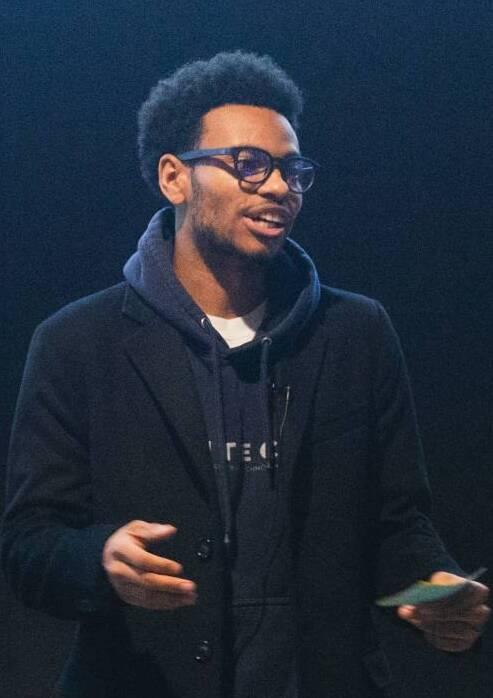
- Hofstetter lecturing at North Carolina A&T.
- Born: George Emmett Coates-Hofstetter; April 16, 2000 (age 26); Los Angeles County, California, U.S.
- Education: Menlo College | Hasso Plattner Institute of Design | University of Cambridge | Columbia University
- Occupation: Computer programmer | human rights activist | tech entrepreneur
- Known for: Hacktivism
- Title: Founder, chief executive officer, and executive chairman of GHTech Inc.
- Board member of: Kingmakers of Oakland | GHTech Inc.
- Awards: Social Justice Award: The Equal Justice Society, James Cole Jr. Award: Entrepreneurs of Tomorrow
- Website: Official website

George Hofstetter is an American computer programmer, tech entrepreneur, and campaigner for Black rights who has been active since 2013. He went on to found GHTech Inc., a software and curriculum development company that builds at the intersection of technology and social justice. He is the current chief executive officer and executive chairman of GHTech Inc.

== Career ==
In 2013, aged 13, Hofstetter competed in the Qeyno Labs Hackathon in Oakland, California, where he and his group developed a social network called "Connect the Dots," creating a space for Black students in private predominantly white schools to share their experiences with one another. His team finished third at the hackathon.

The following year's Qeyno Labs Hackathon was sponsored by ESSENCE and Qeyno Labs in New Orleans and was after the launch of YesWeCode, an initiative started by Prince and Van Jones after the killing of Trayvon Martin with the goal of helping 100,000 young women and men from underrepresented backgrounds to be successful in the tech sector. He and his team developed an app called CopStop to address issues of police violence in Oakland.

After the hackathon and his graduation from The Hidden Genius Project, Hofstetter received a two-year internship in the office of Oakland mayor Libby Schaaf.

Hofstetter founded his company at age 16 with the goal of helping other kids of color gain entry into the world of technology as innovators. He worked on a project for Capital One DevExchange to create a free mobile online curriculum, UpToCode Academy. In the fall of 2017, He was honored by the Equal Justice Society during their annual gala in San Francisco, CA for his work through GHTech Inc.

Hofstetter was included in Google's Black History Month Pay it Forward Challenge in March 2019.

In October 2019, he spoke at a TEDxYouth event at the Seattle Academy of Arts and Sciences. His talk was entitled "How technology redefined can be a social justice super power."

Hofstetter's most recent projects/events include the launch of a social networking app designed for education for a California-based non-profit Kingmakers of Oakland, being featured in the documentary, ‘Use of Force: The policing of Black America’ alongside Alicia Garza and Chuck D.

After a viral incident that became international news where Hofstetter was the target of a racist digital attack during his studies at the University of Cambridge. He wrote an opinion piece for the University of Oxford's student paper, The Oxford Blue.

In 2026, Hofstetter graduated from Columbia University with a Bachelor of Arts in Political Science and began a Master of Philosophy in Knowledge, Power and Politics at St. Catharine's College, University of Cambridge, where he also co-founded The Technology Research Institute for Qualitative Change (TRIQC), a global research initiative dedicated to reimagining how technology serves humanity.
