= Open Window School =

Coordinates: 47.5477°N 122.1146°W

- Bellevue, Washington; United States

Information
- Type: Independent
- Established: 1985
- Locale: Suburban
- Head of School: Elaine Christensen
- Grades: K-8
- Enrollment: 360
- Colors: Crimson and Cream
- Religious Affiliation: None
- Website: www.openwindowschool.org

Open Window School is an independent K-8 school for students who have been formally identified as intellectually gifted. Open Window School is located in Bellevue, Washington on Cougar Mountain, which is on the outer edge of the city. Open Window School is a member of the Northwest Association of Independent Schools (NWAIS), the National Association of Independent Schools, and the Washington Federation of Independent Schools (WFIS).

== Achievements ==
Open Window School's use of technology extends from Innovation and Technology Labs to the school's use of social media. Innovation and Technology Director Adrienne Gifford was named Northwest Council for Computer Education (NCCE) Technology Leader of the Year in 2016. In early 2014, a group of five seventh graders won the highest honor, "Best in Nation", in the second Verizon Innovative App Challenge for the app they created. In January 2015, a project by a sixth grader won first prize in the Future Engineers 3D Printing Space Challenge. This pupil designed a Space Planter to be 3D printed on the International Space Station. A group of five middle school students won the 2016 Verizon App Challenge Best in Region Award, designing an app to serve patients with neurological diseases. Open Window School also has what is perceived by some, not all to be an extremely strong debate program, and they consistently have displayed in data to be among the highest-ranking teams in every debate tournament.

During the 2015–16 school year, Open Window was one of 22 schools in the United States and Canada invited to participate in the Student Spaceflight Experiments Program. Working in teams, fourth through eighth-grade students designed microgravity experiments and an outside panel of researchers chose one of the seventh-grade experiments to be conducted on the International Space Station.

In the 2020–2021 school year, two fifth graders (Jacob Park and Julia Stewart) won first place nationally in the ExploraVision competition, with their solar-powered "Coagulation Filtration System" which utilizes Ideonella sakaiensis microbes to break down microplastics for drinking water.

In the 2023-2024 school year, three fifth graders (Julian Kotsis, Brody Cho, and Chase Carlson) won first place in the nationwide ExploraVision. ExploraVision is a competition in which students participate to develop drafts for ideas that will benefit or solve a specific problem. Their idea was called PetConnect, designed to help pets who lack owners. It uses Artificial intelligence to gather data on pets' behaviors and speech to connect with owners, overall reducing the number of pets killed inhumanely due to lack of and owner.

Other achievements of the school include honorable mentions also stemming from the nationwide Explora Vision program. Kyren Metzmaker and Rishab Mitra won an honorable mention for their technology concept "BirdBound" which uses a certain type of glass that birds can see to prevent bird deaths relating to crashing into windows unintentionally.

== Debate program ==
The Open Window debate program helps students, "learn to build a clear argument and support it with evidence. They practice public speaking, listen closely to opposing ideas, and respond with composure". The debate team has also won several local competitions, with Kyren Metzmaker, Ricky Rui, and William Pan placing first in their division (Novice-E) with a total of 796 speaker points. They won all three rounds and had zero losses.

== Athletics & extra-curricular programs ==
The school's athletic programs currently include cross country, golf, tennis, basketball, soccer, Ultimate Frisbee, track and field, parkour, and volleyball. The girls' volleyball team completed an undefeated season in 2014. The school mascot is Rufus the Bobcat, who eighth graders may portray in costume at various school events. In addition to athletics, the school offers students the opportunity to compete in after-school activities including chess, debate, Model United Nations, and robotics.

== Gallery ==
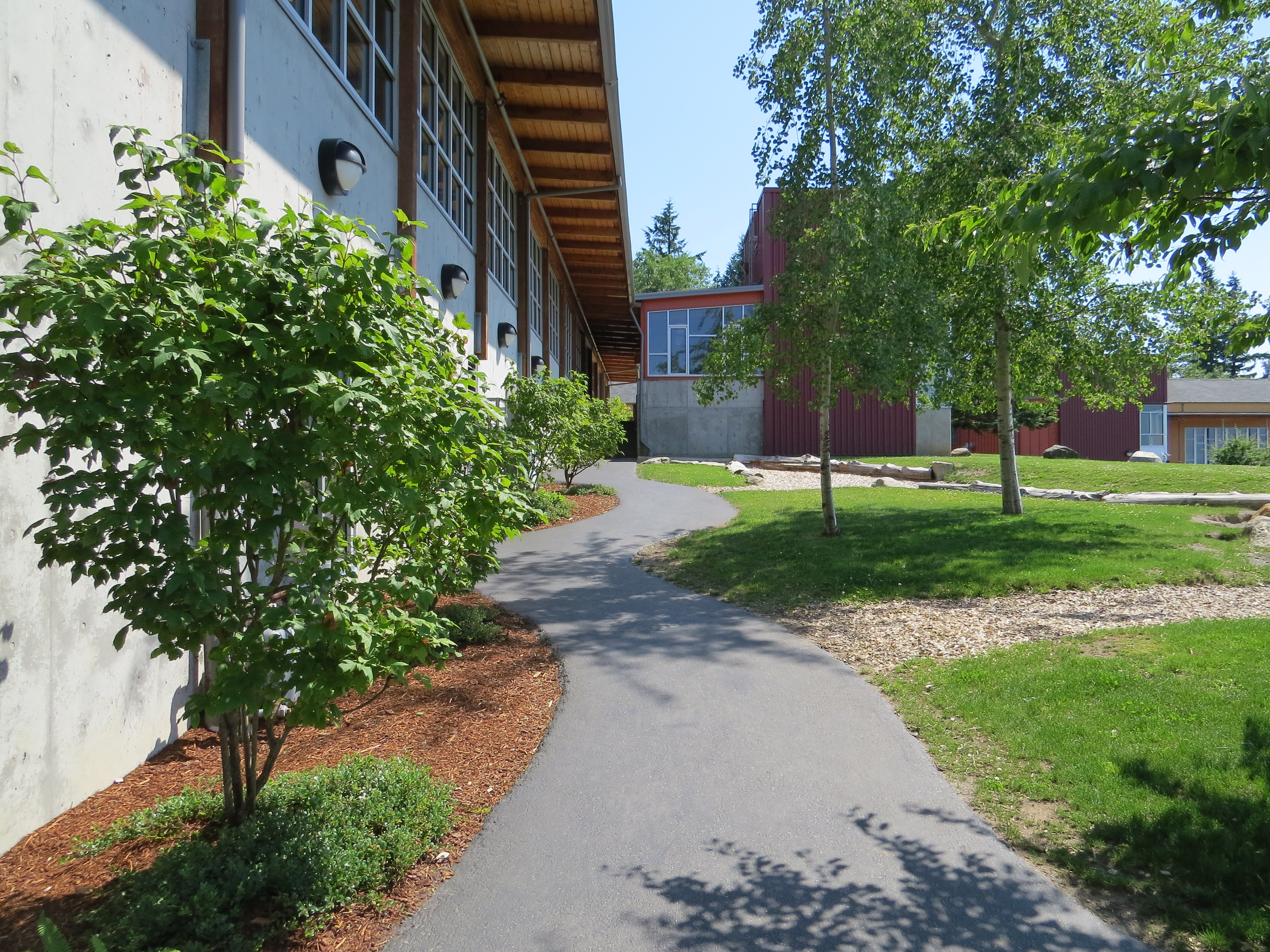
Heckerman Hall, the building for grades K-4

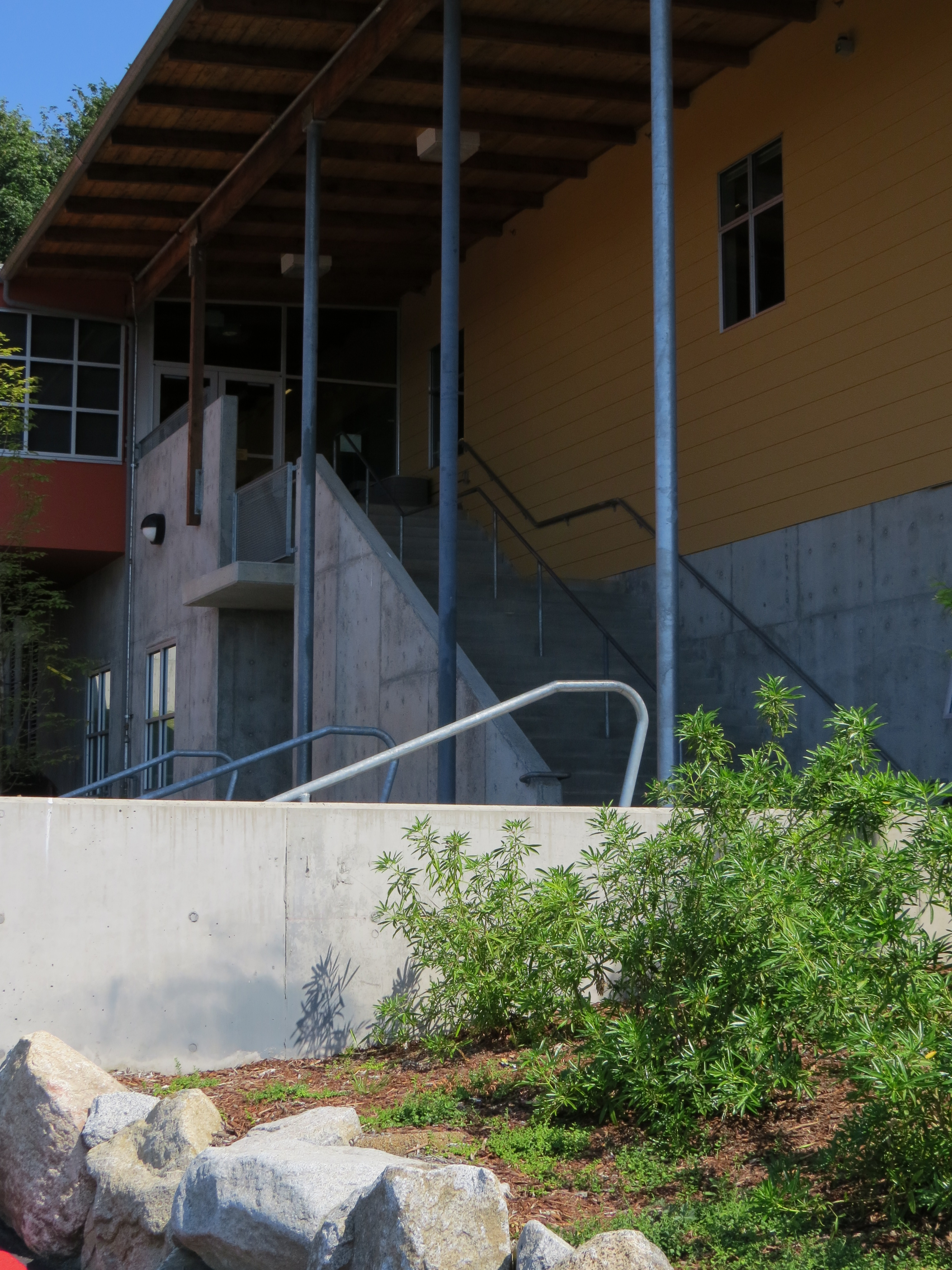
Robinson Hall, the building for grades 5-8

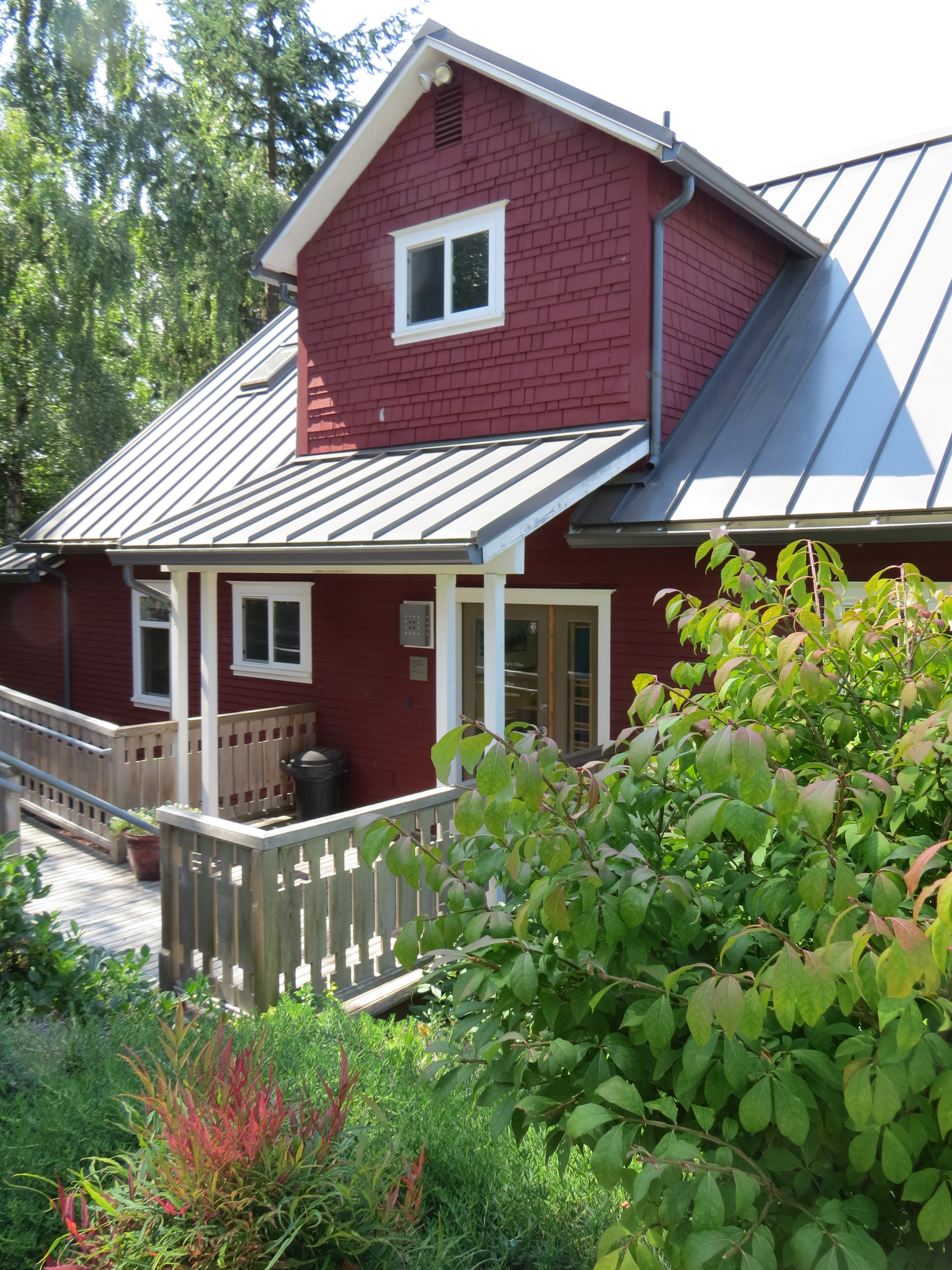
The Farmhouse, the operations building

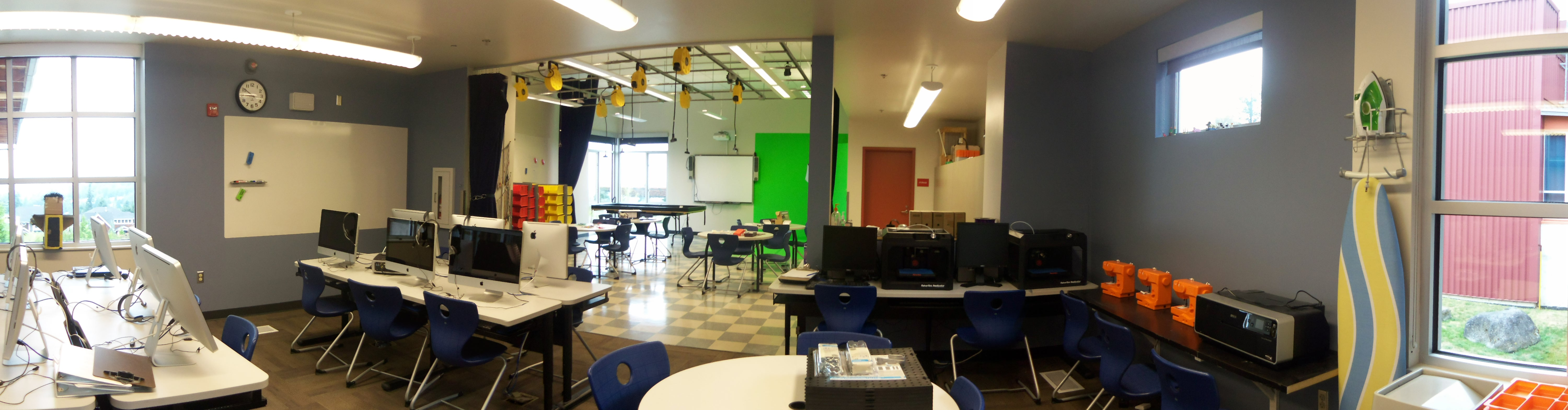
The Middle School Innovation & Technology lab

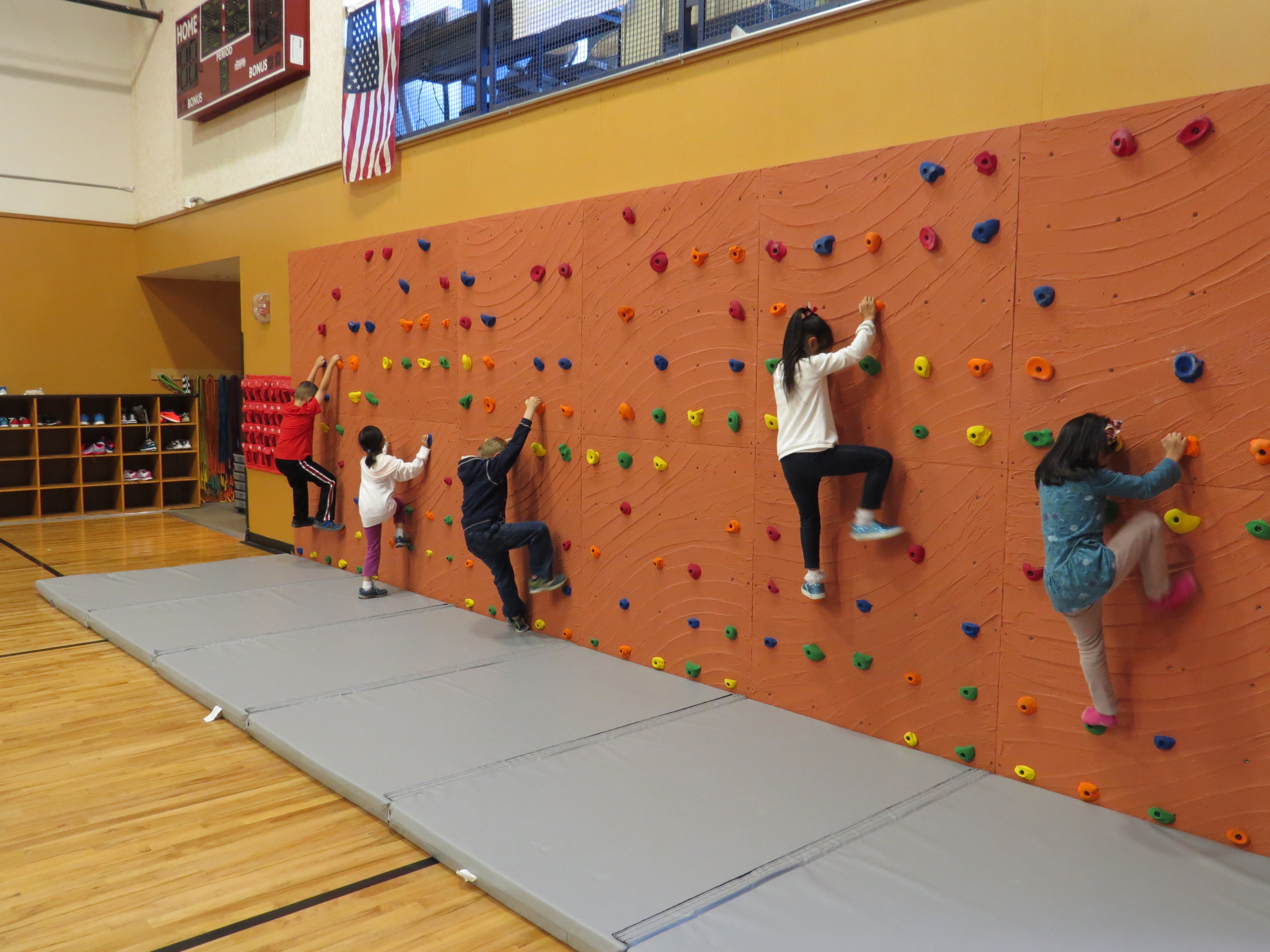
The climbing wall in the Roper Gym

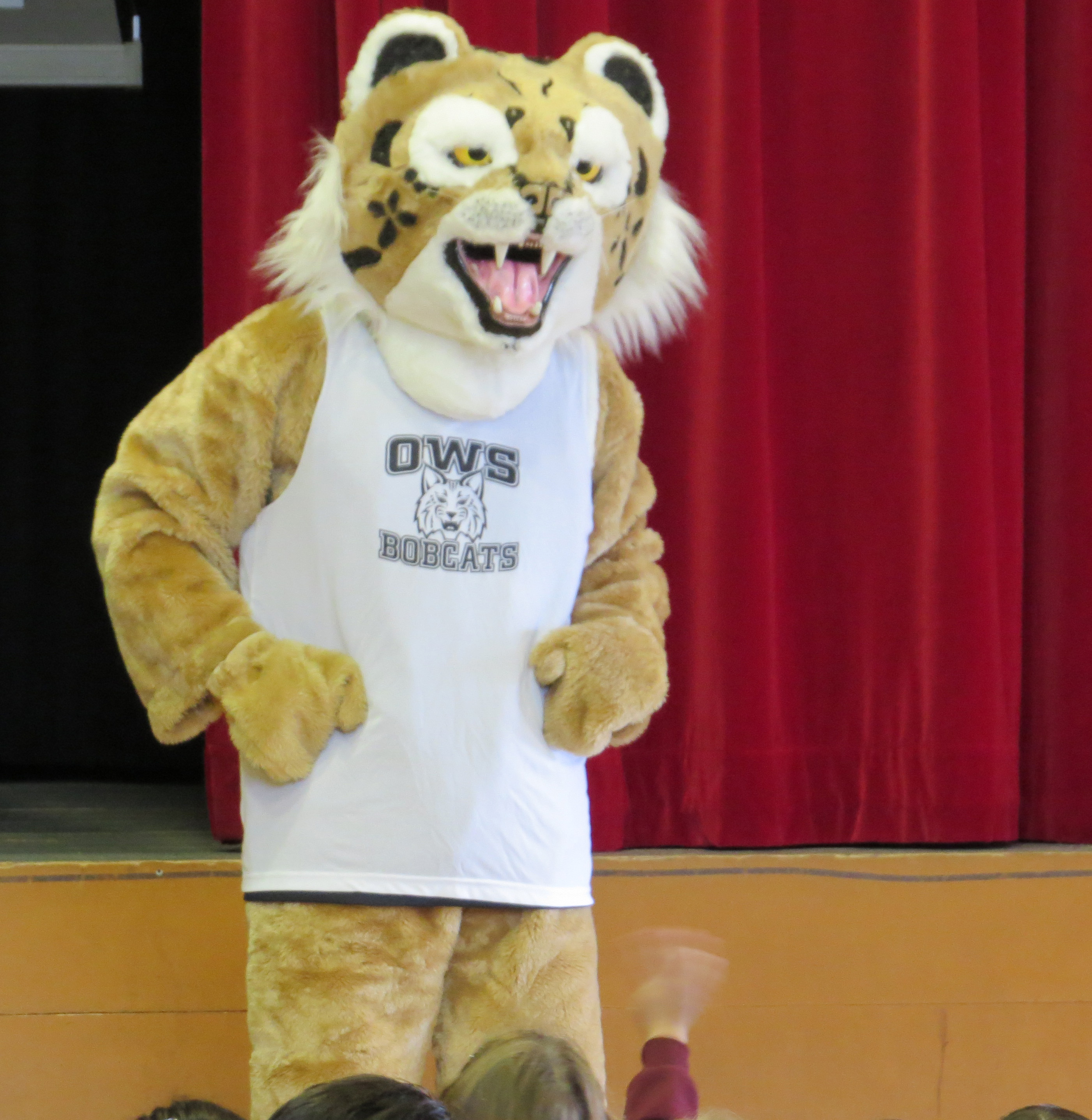
Rufus the Bobcat, the school mascot
