= SCDS =

SCDS may refer to:

- Superior canal dehiscence syndrome, a medical condition of the inner ear leading to hearing and balance disorders
- Sequential compression devices
- Sacramento Country Day School
- Savannah Country Day School
- Seattle Country Day School
- SimCity DS - a simulation/city building computer game
- Sonoma Country Day School
