= French International School of Oregon =

- L'école Française Internationale de l'Oregon
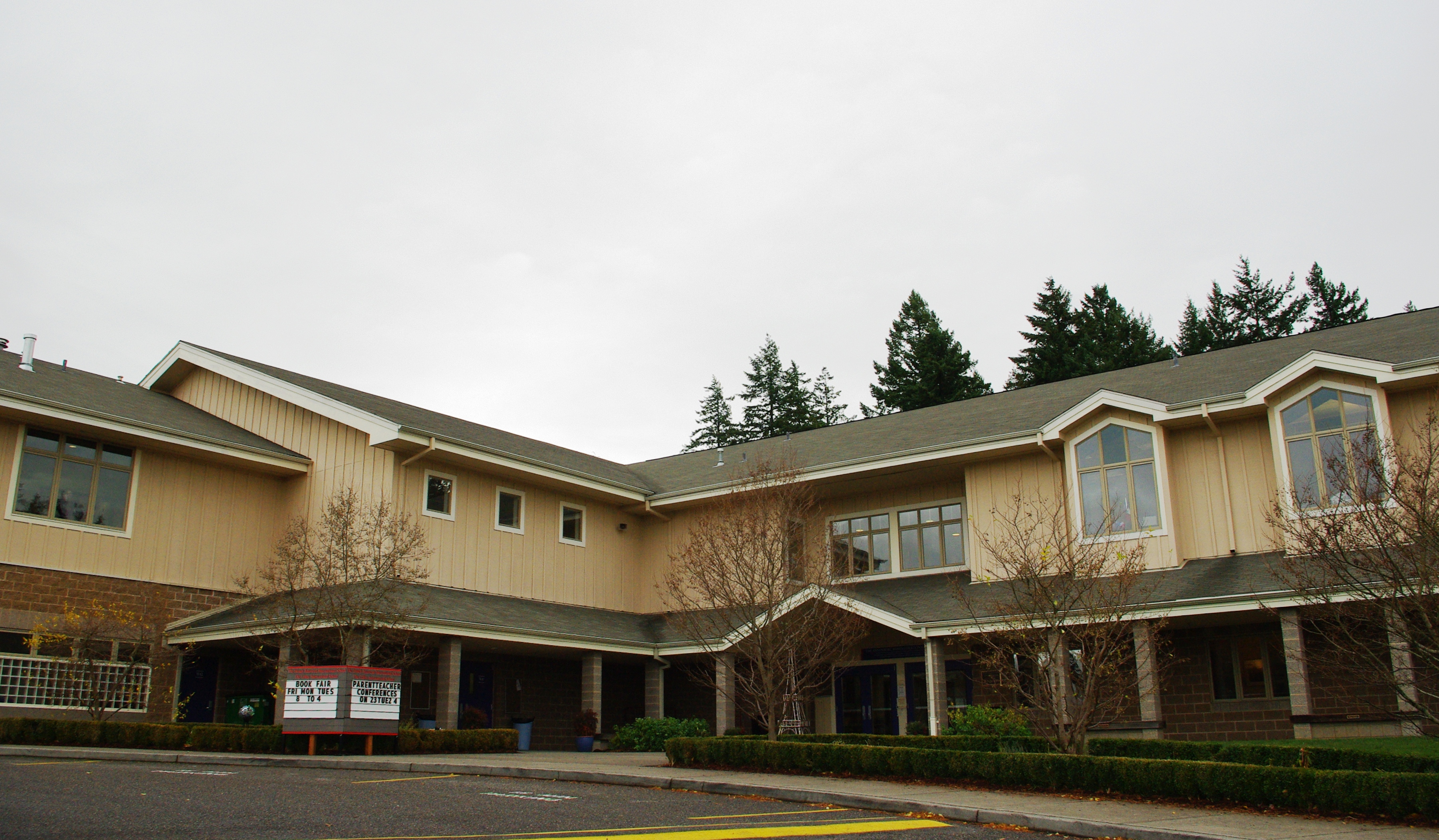

Location
- 8500 NW Johnson Street; Portland, Oregon 97229; United States; 45.528661°N 122.765058°W

Information
- Other name: French International
- Type: Private
- Opened: 1979; 47 years ago
- Founder: Jean-Claude and Maarja Paris
- Principal: Gabrielle Esbeck, Maternelle Division Head Aurore Molerus, Lower School Division Head Estelle Hughes, Middle School Division Head
- Head of school: Scott Hardister
- Teaching staff: K–8: 64.9 (2019–20)
- Grades: Age 2.5-Eighth Grade
- Enrollment: 580 (2025-26)
- Student to teacher ratio: K-8: 7.3 (2019–20)
- Accreditation: French Ministry of National Education; Northwest Association of Independent Schools (NWAIS)
- Newspaper: La Gazette
- Website: https://www.frenchintl.org

The French International School of Oregon (French: L'école Française Internationale de l'Oregon) is a French and English language private school in Portland, Oregon, United States.

The school was founded by Jean Claude and Maarja Paris in 1979. It has been running since then. It has an annual operating budget of over $7 million. Approximately 92 percent of operating revenue is generated by tuition, with other operations and fundraising activities accounting for the remaining 8 percent.

A partner school, the German American School, is located in Portland and serves grades K-5. Its graduates may elect to attend middle school at French International, in order to receive German-language instruction in language arts and social studies.

Community participation is emphasized at the French International School of Oregon. In 2012, three high school women who learned French at French International assisted with a World War II translation project about "a B-17 crash in the Alps near the French-Italian border." A cookbook by the Families and Friends of French International, Livre de Cuisine : A Compendium of World Recipes, has been favorably reviewed for its use of local food and focus on bringing young people into the kitchen to cook. The school has received Audubon Society certification for "removal of invasive weeds and practicing wildlife stewardship," and a City Commissioner complimented its students for providing "sophisticated ideas and articulate comments" on the 2010 Portland Plan.

== See also ==
- Agency for French Education Abroad
- Education in France
- American School of Paris - An American international school in France
