= Hamlin Robinson School =

Location
- 1701 20th Ave S Seattle, Washington 98144; United States; 47°36′48″N 122°18′34″W

Information
- Type: Private
- Established: 1983
- Head of school: Stacy Turner
- Staff: 33 (instructional)
- Grades: 1-8
- Enrollment: about 400
- Campus: Urban
- Accreditation: Northwest Association of Independent Schools
- Tuition: $23,450 - $25,650 (2019-20)
- Website: www.hamlinrobinson.org

The Hamlin Robinson School, located in Seattle, Washington, United States is an independent private school for students who have dyslexia and other language-based learning differences, from Grade 1 through Grade 8.

== History ==
The Hamlin Robinson School is a non-profit school in Washington that specializes in a program specifically for children with dyslexia and other language-related learning issues. In 1991 HRS was accredited by the Pacific Northwest Association of Independent Schools.

The school was founded in 1983 by the Slingerland Institute for Literacy and the Robinson family, in memory of Hamlin Robinson, the first board chair of the Slingerland Institute.

On May 5, 2010, the Seattle School Board approved the lease of the T.T. Minor building to the Hamlin Robinson School.

On October 8, 2012, the school announced that it would be moving to a permanent location, and on September 23, 2013, announced that the site would be in the North Beacon Hill neighborhood. The school moved to its permanent home on June 15, 2015. A middle school building was added in 2022.

== School details ==
The school has around 385 pupils in grades 1 to 8. The average class size is 13-15 students.

It is approved by the State of Washington as an independent, not-for-profit, coeducational day school for primary to high school-aged students. It is accredited by the Northwest Association of Independent Schools and the National Association of Independent Schools.
