= Oak Hill School =

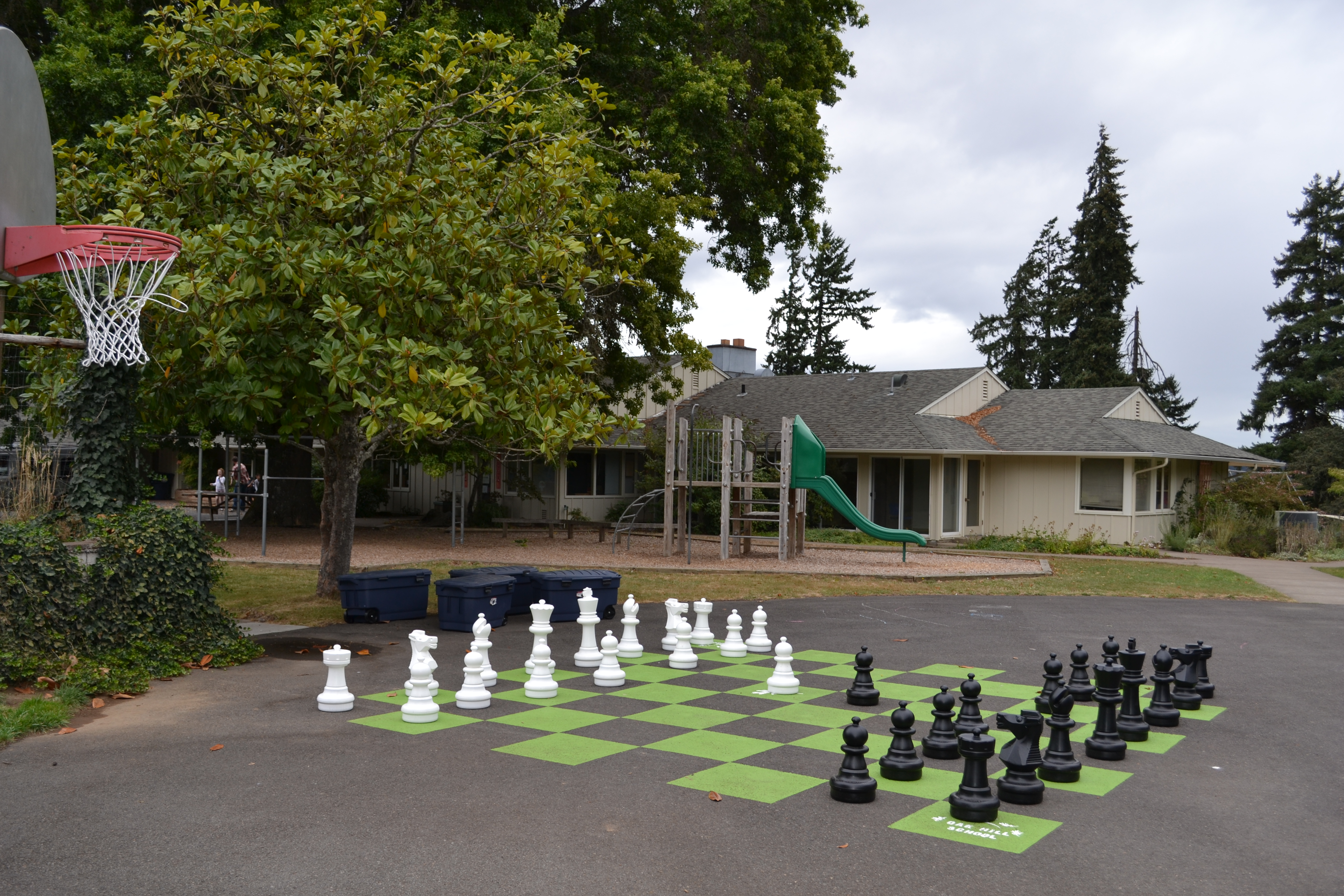

Location
- 86397 Eldon Schafer Drive; Eugene, Lane County, Oregon 97405; United States; 44.007858°N 123.026442°W

Information
- Type: Private
- Opened: 1994
- Principal: Pete Moore
- Grades: Pre-K to 8th Grade
- Enrollment: 158
- Colors: green and white
- Athletics conference: OSAA Mountain West League 1A-3
- Mascot: Falcons
- Accreditation: NWAIS (Northwest Association of Independent Schools)
- Website: www.oakhillschool.net

Oak Hill School (OHS) is a pre-Kindergarten through eighth grade independent school in Eugene, Oregon, United States.

== Offerings and costs ==
Founded in 1994 by Ed King of King Estate Winery, Oak Hill School provides a college preparatory program for students and instructs pre-Kindergarten through eighth grade students. Oak Hill School is accredited by the Northwest Association of Independent Schools. The campus sits on 72 acres (29 ha) of former ranch and forestland overlooking the South Eugene Hills.

K–8 students at OHS can learn Mandarin Chinese and Spanish languages.

According to the 2022–2023 school year student tuition and fee schedule, pre-Kindergarten services are US$8,000 annually, Kindergarten through fifth grade services are US$18,500 annually, and sixth through eighth grade services are US$19,000.

== Dropping of high school program ==
In May 2022, the school's board decided to shut down its high school program (ninth through twelfth grades) to refocus on K–8 students. The board's decision was heavily influenced by the COVID-19 pandemic, since the board members believed that distance learning will become a standard in secondary education.

== Bobcat incident ==
On October 15, 2019, a bobcat kitten wandered onto OHS's campus. School administrators reportedly trapped it inside an office so that authorities can remove it once they arrive. An Oregon State trooper and an Oregon Department of Fish and Wildlife (ODFW) biologist decided to kill the bobcat with "blunt force trauma to the head" after capturing it, believing that the bobcat acted with "abnormal" behavior, according to Eugene Weekly. The cited behavior was that the bobcat entered a building on OHS's campus. Oregon State Police (OSP) issued a statement saying that a swift blow to the bobcat's head rendered it deceased "instantly".

Oregon veterinarians questioned the euthanization via blunt force trauma by OSP. The President of the Oregon Veterinary Medical Association, Constance N. White, inquired about the incident in a letter to the superintendent of OSP. White called for an audit of the incident through OSP and ODFW. 62 other veterinarians from across Oregon signed a letter asking Oregon governor Kate Brown to use state resources to investigate the incident.

Oregon lawmakers, including Representative Brad Witt, conducted a hearing through the Oregon House Interim Committee on Natural Resources to investigate the euthanization, since some wildlife protection groups like Humane Society of the United States and Eugene-based Predator Defense did not have all inquiries answered (for example, Predator Defense and several news media outlets asked OSP what was used to inflict the blunt force trauma to the bobcat's head, which went unanswered).

A second bobcat, potentially a sibling, was found near OHS's campus (but not in a building) on October 16, 2019. It was released to the wild by ODFW authorities.
