= Jackson Hole Community School =

School in Wyoming, United States

Coordinates: 43°27′31.08″N 110°47′58.54″W

Jackson Hole Community School is a small, college preparatory high school in Jackson, Wyoming, United States. It was founded in 2004 by Scott "Profe" Hirschfield and has around 100 students as of 2026. The school will be expanding to include a middle school serving Grades 6–8 in addition to its high school beginning in the 2026–27 school year. It is accredited by the Northwest Association of Independent Schools.
