= Bright Water School =

Coordinates: 47°37′58″N 122°19′14″W

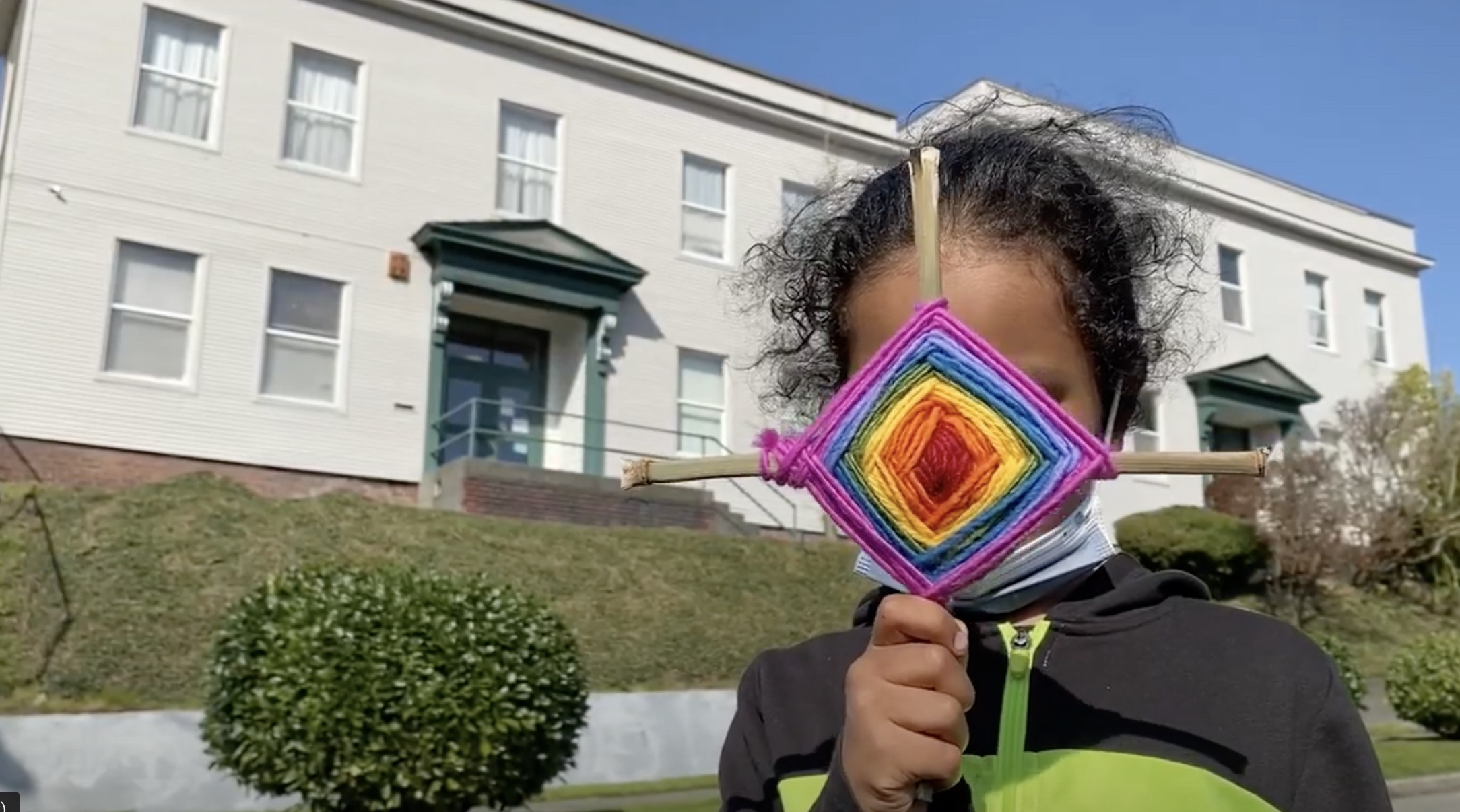
Bright Water Waldorf School is located within the historic Japanese Community Cultural Center of Washington (JCCCW) in Seattle's International District

Bright Water Waldorf School is a Preschool through Grade Eight Waldorf School in Seattle, Washington, located in the Japanese Community Cultural Center of Washington in Seattle's International District; Its grade school program includes Japanese, Spanish, Handwork, Woodworking, Aikido, Orchestra, and Band.

Bright Water Waldorf School was founded in 1998 and is a Candidate Member of the Northwest Association of Independent Schools and a Developing School in the Association of Waldorf Schools of North America (AWSNA).

== See also ==
- Waldorf education
- Curriculum of the Waldorf schools
