= French Immersion School of Washington =

School in Washington, United States

Location
- 4211 W Lake Sammamish Pkwy; Bellevue, King County, Washington 98008-5936; United States; 47°34′11″N 122°06′06″W

Information
- Religious affiliation: Nonsectarian
- Established: 1999
- Status: Open
- Oversight: Agency for French Education Abroad
- NCES School ID: A0110124
- Head of school: Yvan Tabellion
- Faculty: 14 (on an FTE basis)
- Grades: PK-5
- Gender: Coed
- Enrollment: 201 (2021-2022)
  - Pre-kindergarten: 66
  - Kindergarten: 31
  - Grade 1: 26
  - Grade 2: 29
  - Grade 3: 16
  - Grade 4: 21
  - Grade 5: 12
- Student to teacher ratio: 9.6:1
- Language: French
- Hours in school day: 7.2
- Campus type: Midsize city
- Annual tuition: $23,850
- Website: www.fisw.org

The French Immersion School of Washington is a bilingual day school for children ages 2½ to 11 years old in Bellevue, Washington, United States. The school adheres to the curriculum of the French Ministry of Education. Founded in 1999, the French Immersion School of Washington is one of only approximately 54 French-American bilingual schools in the United States and is a member of the Northwest Association of Independent Schools.
