= DJ Rogers =

American football player (born 2001)

Profile
- Position: Tight end

Personal information
- Born: October 10, 2001 (age 25); Kingston, Jamaica
- Listed height: 6 ft 4 in (1.93 m)
- Listed weight: 245 lb (111 kg)

Career information
- High school: Eastside Catholic (Sammamish, Washington)
- College: TCU (2021–2025)
- NFL draft: 2026: undrafted

Career history
- Dallas Cowboys (2026)*
- * Offseason or practice squad member only
- Stats at Pro Football Reference

D'Andre "DJ" Rogers (born November 10, 2001) is an American professional football tight end. He played college football for the TCU Horned Frogs.

== Early life ==
Rogers attended Eastside Catholic School in Sammamish, Washington. Coming out of high school, he was rated as a four-star recruit and the 7th overall tight end in the class of 2021, where he held offers from schools such as Miami, Penn State, LSU, Georgia, West Virginia, Oregon, Washington State, USC, California, and Arizona State. Initially, Rogers committed to play college football for the California Golden Bears. However, Rogers later flipped his commitment and signed to play for the TCU Horned Frogs.

== College career ==
In his first two seasons from 2021 through 2022, Rogers played in 16 total games, while also utilizing a redshirt. During the 2023 season, he notched seven receptions for 78 yards and a touchdown. In the 2024 season, Rogers totaled 12 catches for 142 yards and two touchdowns. He entered the 2025 season, as the team's starting tight end after the graduation of Jared Wiley and Drake Dabney. In week one of the 2025 season, Rogers hauled in five passes for 43 yards and a touchdown in a victory over North Carolina. For his performance during the 2025 season, Rogers accepted an invite to participate in the 2026 Senior Bowl.

== Professional career ==
Pre-draft measurables
Height	Weight	Arm length	Hand span	Wingspan	40-yard dash	10-yard split	20-yard split	20-yard shuttle	Three-cone drill	Vertical jump	Broad jump	Bench press
6 ft 3 7/8 in (1.93 m)	258 lb (117 kg)	33 5/8 in (0.85 m)	9 1/2 in (0.24 m)	6 ft 10 1/4 in (2.09 m)	4.66 s	1.70 s	2.77 s	4.33 s	7.03 s	31.5 in (0.80 m)	10 ft 0 in (3.05 m)	15 reps
All values from NFL Combine/Pro Day

After not being selected in the 2026 NFL draft, Rogers was signed by the Dallas Cowboys as an undrafted free agent. He was waived/injured by the team on August 30, 2026. On October 27, Rogers was waived with an injury settlement.
