= Seattle Waldorf School =

Private school in Seattle, Washington, USA

Coordinates: 47°42′06″N 122°17′51″W

Logo

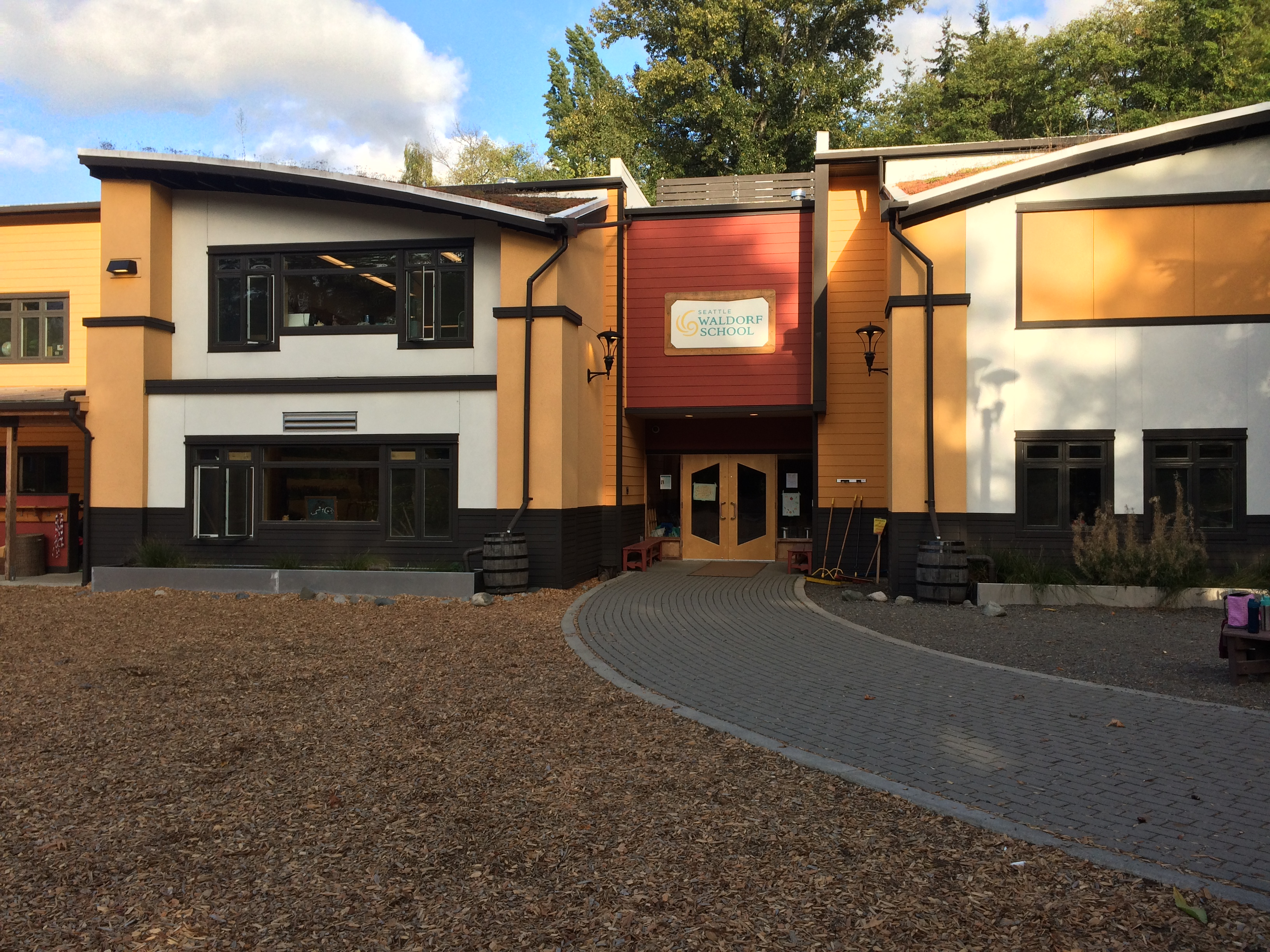
Meadowbrook campus of the Seattle Waldorf School

Seattle Waldorf School is a private, Waldorf school serving grades preschool through grade 8 with an enrollment of 200 students. It was founded in 1980 and absorbed Hazel Wolf High School in 2007. The high school was located in Magnuson Park in Seattle's Sand Point neighborhood; two of the kindergarten classes are held in Wallingford; and the other kindergarten class, preschool, grades 1–8, and the administration are located in Meadowbrook.

Seattle Waldorf School is a Candidate Member School of the Pacific Northwest Association of Independent Schools (PNAIS) and a Member School of the Association of Waldorf Schools of North America (AWSNA).

== Controversy ==
A news article published by the Seattle Times, based in data from the 2011–2012 school year, revealed that the Seattle Waldorf School held the highest vaccination exemption rate for schools in the Greater Seattle Area of 39.8 percent. 128 out of 130 exemptions were submitted by parents of students for non- medical or religious justifications.

== See also ==
- Waldorf education
- Curriculum of the Waldorf schools
