= Seattle Jewish Community School =

Coordinates: 47.680874°N 122.325202°W

- Seattle, Washington; United States

Information
- Type: Private, K - 5
- Religious affiliations: Judaism, Egalitarian
- Established: 1991
- Head of School: David Zimand
- Faculty: 12
- Enrollment: 51
- Student to teacher ratio: 9:1
- Campus: Green Lake
- Colors: Turquoise and Cranberry
- Website: http://www.sjcs.net

Seattle Jewish Community School, (SJCS), is an independent, egalitarian Jewish day school from kindergarten through 5th grade, located in North Seattle, Washington, USA. The school is accredited by NWAIS (Northwest Association of Independent Schools), a member of the Washington Federation of Independent Schools, and a member of PRIZMAH Center for Jewish Day Schools.

== History ==
Established in 1991 as Seattle Jewish Primary School, the school later expanded to 5th grade and changed its name to SJCS. SJCS was located at Congregation Beth Shalom, then Temple Beth Am, and the school purchased its current building on October 24, 2008.

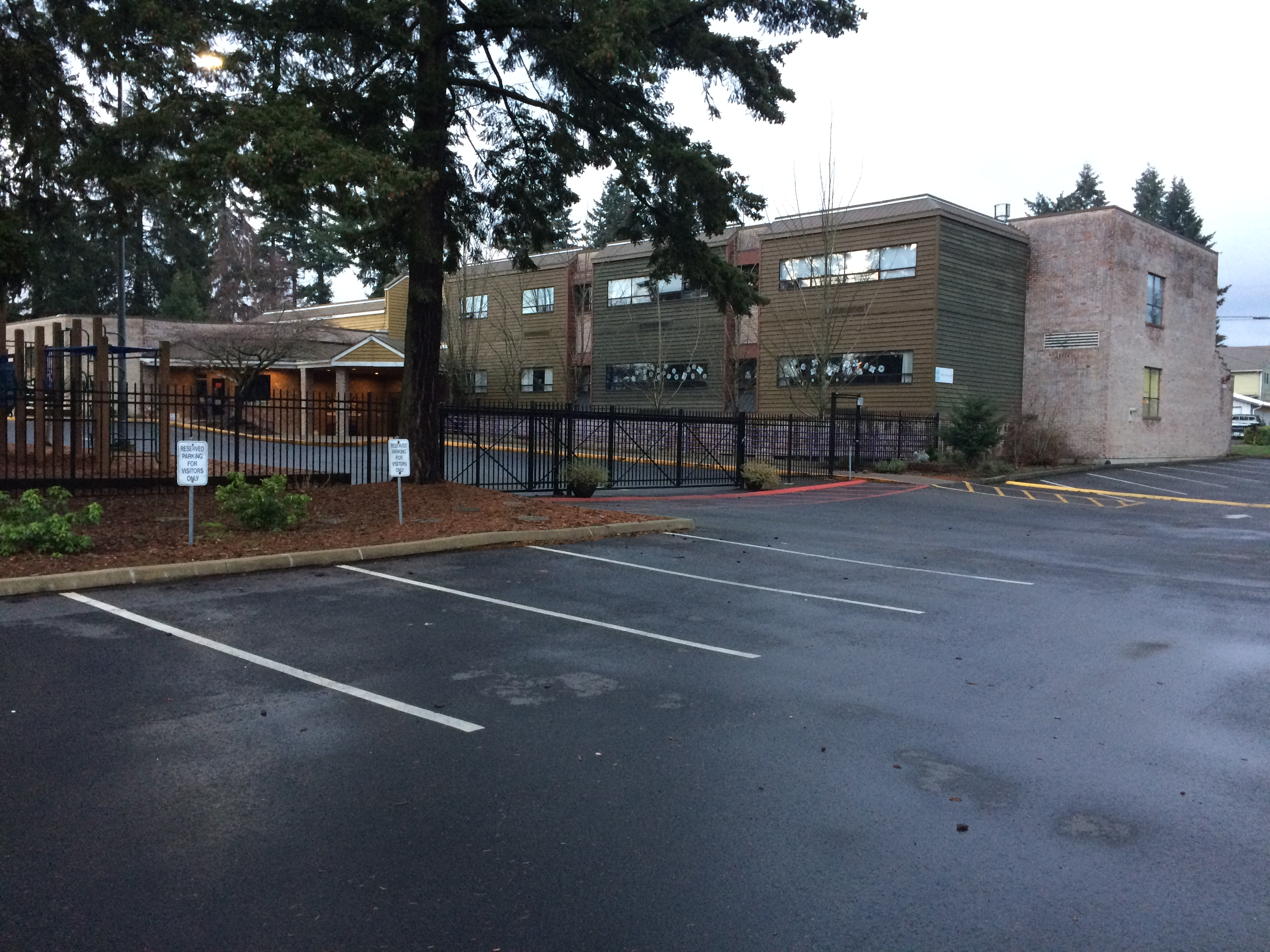
Seattle Jewish Community School campus

SJCS has had four Heads of School in its 19-year history. Debra J.G. Butler was the founding principal and served until 1995, establishing the school's primary division. Joyce Shane was head for a decade, and expanded the school into 5th grade. Upon Shane's retirement, Butler returned to SJCS to lead the transition to SJCS' Northgate-area campus. From 2010 to 2018, Shoshana K. Bilavsky was Head of School. Ron Waldman became Head of School in the summer of 2018.

SJCS opened a new campus in the Green Lake neighborhood on Woodlawn Ave N.E.in the building formerly occupied by Billings Middle School.

In addition to tuition, SJCS receives funding from individual and institutional donors including the Jewish Federation of Greater Seattle and the Samis Foundation.

== Academics and student life ==
SJCS enrollment is open to students from Seattle and its suburbs and who speak English, Hebrew, and Russian as first languages in their homes. According to NWAIS, the accrediting body for the school, it enrolls families that are both affiliated and unaffiliated with a synagogue or havurah.

Among some of its services and specialty curricula, the school lists art, before- and after-school enrichment, creative dance/movement, music, physical education, science, learning specialist, a library, and a school counselor.
