= Seattle Girls' School =

Coordinates: 47°35′57″N 122°17′49″W

- 1700 24th Ave S Seattle, Washington 98144

Information
- Type: Private girls' middle school
- Established: Fall 2001
- Head of school: Brenda Leaks
- Staff: 12 staff
- Faculty: 18
- Grades: 5-8
- Color: Purple
- Mascot: Bees
- Website: www.seattlegirlsschool.org

Seattle Girls' School is an all-girls middle school located in the central district of Seattle at South Massachusetts and 24th Ave South. Seattle Girls' School (also known as SGS) is an accredited member of the Northwest Association of Independent Schools and a full member of the National Association of Independent Schools.

In the 2011–2012 academic year, SGS enrolled 105 students. The student-teacher ratio is currently about 10:1, and the average class size 15. Tuition was $2,389 a school month in 2011-2012 totaling $21,500 for the school year.

== History ==
Seattle Girls' School was founded by the board of trustees, a group of Seattle residents, in fall 2001. The school's original location at the corner of S. Jackson Street and MLK Way S was not completely finished when students for that year were being admitted, and the first open house was held in a gymnasium.

From the founding in 2001 to 2005 SGS accepted students through 6th and 7th grade. In the 2005-2006 year 5th grade and 8th grade was added.

In 2022, the school moved to its current location on the corner of South Massachusetts and 24th Ave South. The school is currently building a gymnasium, it is slated to be completed in 2025.
