= Seattle Country Day School =

Coordinates: 47°38′37″N 122°21′02″W

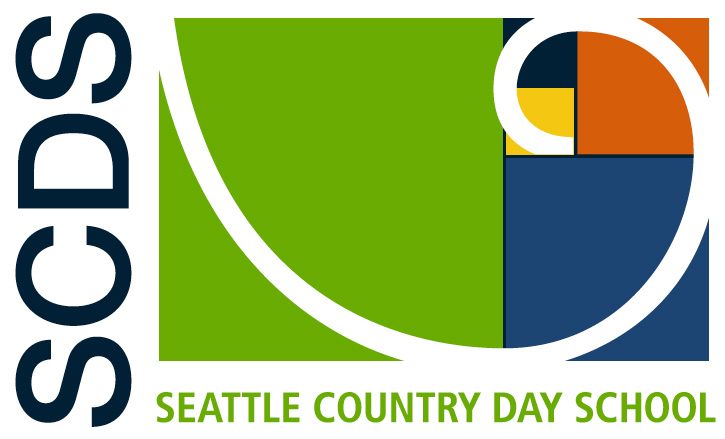
- Seattle, Washington; United States

Information
- Type: Private/Independent
- Established: 1964
- Faculty: 75
- Grades: K-8
- Enrollment: 420
- Colors: Blue and Green
- Mascot: Wildcats
- Religious Affiliation: None
- Website: http://www.seattlecountryday.org

Seattle Country Day School (SCDS) is a private/independent kindergarten–grade 8 school in Seattle, Washington. The school was founded in 1962 by a small group of parents dedicated to seeking an educational program for their children. In 1964 the school was officially incorporated as Seattle Country Day School under the directorship of Lucile G. Beckman. SCDS's curriculum is inquiry-based and integrates social emotional learning components into the core curriculum and advisory blocks. The school's campus is on the north side of the Queen Anne Hill neighborhood, near the Washington State Route 99 Aurora Bridge.

== Membership and Accreditation ==
Seattle Country Day School is a member of the following organizations:

- National Association of Independent Schools (NAIS)
- Northwest Association of Independent Schools (NWAIS)
- Educational Records Bureau (ERB)
- Washington Association of Educators of the Talented and Gifted (WAETAG)
- Washington Federation of Independent Schools (WFIS)
- Washington Green Schools

== History ==
Originally housed in St. Elizabeth's church basement in Burien and conceived as an educational alternative during the Sputnik era of the late 1950s, SCDS developed through two interim organizations, Adastra ("to the stars") and Phoenix ("rising from the ashes"), before becoming incorporated as Seattle Country Day School in 1964. For over 20 years, the leadership of its founding director, Lucile Beckman, guided the school. Following Heads of School include: Dr. Jayasri Ghosh 1986-2001, Chris Massi 2001-2003, Michael Murphy 2004–2018, and Kimberly Zaidberg 2018–present. In 1972, the school moved from its founding location to the old Forest Ridge Academy on north Capitol Hill, followed by a second move in 1974 to the Temple De Hirsch school building at 15th and Madison. In 1975 the present facilities on Queen Anne Hill were purchased.

== Academics ==
Seattle Country Day School's 425 students span kindergarten through eighth grade. There are 64 faculty and administrative members.

== Athletics ==
Athletics are an integral part of the SCDS school program, with the purpose of providing educational experiences beyond the classroom curriculum. During the winter all student participate in Winterim, a 30-year tradition that spans six consecutive Fridays in January and February where students, faculty, and often parents hit the slopes or the ice rink. Students engage in Nordic instruction at Snoqualmie Pass, alpine skiing at Crystal Mountain, and a hybrid skating and service learning program in Seattle.

The Seattle Country Day School Athletic Department offers a variety of after-school athletic opportunities throughout the school year. Soccer, cross country, tennis and basketball take place in the fall while volleyball, track & field and Ultimate take place in the spring. Students in grades K-5 participate in the Catholic Youth Organization CYO. Middle School students compete in the Cascade Middle School League (CMSL), and Disc NW Youth Ultimate League.

== Extracurricular Activities ==
Seattle Country Day School students participate in a variety of after school and extracurricular activities including: chess club, computer programming, Destination Imagination, sewing, yoga, and drama. Of note, SCDS students were 2014 National K-3 U800 Chess Champions. Other notable mentions include a first-place team finish in the 2014 PAC-NW Debate League, and a 3rd place student individual finish at the U.S.A. Archery Indoor National Championships in 2014.

== Notable alumni ==
- Sally Jewell '66, 51st United States Secretary of the Interior
- Alexis Denisof '79, Actor
- Corbin Carroll '15, Major League Baseball player for the Arizona Diamondbacks
