= Evergreen School (Shoreline, Washington) =

School in Washington, United States

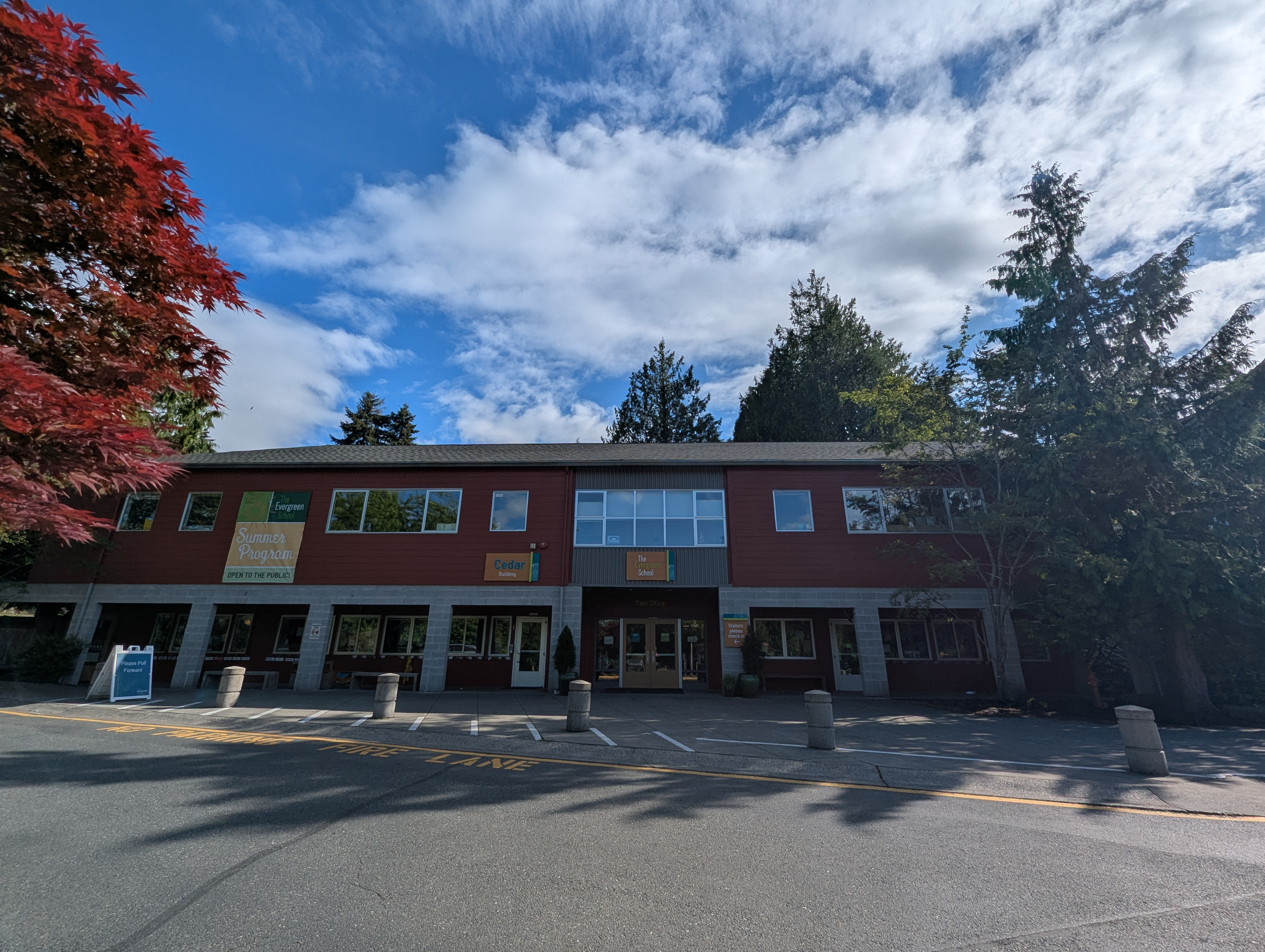

Location
- 15201 Meridian Ave. N Shoreline, Washington, United States; 47°44′19″N 122°20′07″W

Information
- Type: Independent school
- Motto: Where learning is an exciting journey
- Established: 1963
- Head of school: Halsey Bell
- Grades: preschool – eighth grade
- Enrollment: 495 (As of 2022)
- Campus: Suburban
- Color: white teal black
- Mascot: Falcon
- Website: http://www.evergreenschool.org

The Evergreen School (formerly known as The Evergreen School for Gifted Children) is an independent school in Shoreline, Washington, a northern suburb of Seattle, Washington, United States. Evergreen is an elementary-middle school that serves highly capable students from preschool to eighth grade.

The school was founded in 1963 by Edith Christensen, with an initial enrollment of six children. Enrollment as of September 2005 was 392 students, with an average of 16 students per classroom. The Evergreen School is accredited by the Pacific Northwest Association of Independent Schools (PNAIS) and the Northwest Association of Schools & Universities (NASCU).

== Sports ==
Evergreen offers soccer, cross country, volleyball, basketball, tennis, and ultimate frisbee. The Evergreen School physical education program also offers fitness tests which consist of the jump roping, pushups, sit-ups, and the pacer.

== Clubs and programs ==
Evergreen offers over 50 after-school clubs and enrichment classes. The two major clubs are the chess and math clubs. Enrichment classes include:

- Art
- Drama
- Fencing
- Handicrafts
- Music
- Science
- Technology
- World Languages
- Cooking food
- Programming
- Geography
- Lab
- Debate
- Magic The Gathering
- Audio Visual (AV) Club

== Notable achievements ==
In 1967, the Evergreen School became the first school in North America to have created a certified school habitat, sponsored by World Wildlife Fund.

In 2003, the school's kindergarten-through-third-grade chess team won the National Elementary Chess Championship in Nashville, Tennessee.

In 2005, King County awarded the school the Green Globe Award for being a community environmental leader with its food composting and worm bin programs.

In 2009, the Evergreen School's kindergarten-through-fifth-grade placed seventh at the National Elementary Chess Championship in Georgia.

The school is responsible for reviving neighboring wetlands and nearby Meridian Creek, which flows into Thornton Creek.

In 2010 Evergreen was named one of the top 10 Washington schools for 2009 by the Johns Hopkins University Center for Talented Youth Search.

In 2013, Evergreen celebrated its 50th birthday.

In 2015, Evergreen finished remodeling the campus.
