= Northwest Association of Independent Schools =

Northwest Association of Independent Schools (NWAIS)
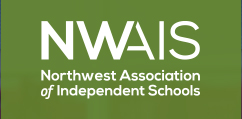
- Type: Non-profit organization
- Headquarters: Seattle, Washington
- Website: www.nwais.org

The Northwest Association of Independent Schools (NWAIS) is a nonprofit membership association that provides accreditation, professional development and support services to over 110 elementary, middle, and secondary independent schools in Alaska, British Columbia, Idaho, Montana, Nevada, Oregon, Utah, Washington and Wyoming.

NWAIS is one of two major agencies that accredit private schools in the Pacific Northwest of the United States and Canada. The other is Cognia.

== Background ==
Formerly the Pacific Northwest Association of Independent Schools (PNAIS), the NWAIS is a member of the National Association of Independent Schools.

== Criteria for accreditation ==
NWAIS develops accreditation standards in compliance with the Criteria for Effective Independent School Accreditation Practices, to foster collegial and ethical relations among its schools, and to safeguard and represent their interests.

NWAIS is recognized as a member of the International Council Advancing Independent School Accreditation (ICAISA), the international authority on independent school accreditation, representing thousands of schools in over 100 countries.

== List of accredited schools ==
The Independent School Facts report published by NAIS for the Northwest Association of Independent Schools, provides statistical data on select schools that are members of NWAIS.

Some of the accredited schools for NWAIS are:

=== A ===
- The Adelson Educational Campus, Las Vegas, Nevada
- The Alexander Dawson School at Rainbow Mountain, Las Vegas
- American Heritage School, Utah
- Annie Wright Schools, Tacoma, Washington

=== B ===
- The Bear Creek School, Redmond, Washington
- Bertschi School, Seattle, Washington
- Billings Middle School, Seattle
- The Bush School, Seattle

=== C ===
- Cascades Academy of Central Oregon
- Catlin Gabel School, Portland, Oregon
- Charles Wright Academy, Tacoma
- Sun Valley Community School, Sun Valley, Idaho

=== D ===
- Delphian School, Sheridan, Oregon

=== E ===
- Eastside Catholic School, Sammamish, Washington
- Eastside Preparatory School, Kirkland, Washington
- Epiphany School, Seattle
- Eton School, Bellevue, Washington
- The Evergreen School, Shoreline, Washington
- Explorer West Middle School, Seattle

=== F ===
- Forest Ridge School of the Sacred Heart, Bellevue
- French International School of Oregon, Portland
- French American School of Puget Sound, Mercer Island, Washington

=== G ===
- Giddens School, Seattle

=== H ===
- Hamlin Robinson School, Seattle
- Holy Names Academy, Seattle
- Hyla School, Bainbridge Island, Washington

=== I ===
- The Island School, Bainbridge Island

=== J ===
- Jackson Hole Community School, Jackson, Wyoming
- Mountain Academy Teton Science Schools, Jackson, WY & Victor, ID

=== L ===
- Lake Tahoe School, Incline Village, Nevada
- Lake Washington Girls Middle School, Seattle
- Lakeside School, Seattle
- The Little School, Bellevue

=== M ===
- McGillis School, Salt Lake City, Utah
- The Meadows School, Las Vegas
- The Meridian School, Seattle
- Missoula International School, Missoula, Montana

=== N ===
- The Northwest Academy, Portland
- The Northwest School, Seattle
- NOVA School, Olympia, Washington

=== O ===
- Oak Hill School, Eugene, Oregon
- Open Window School, Bellevue
- Oregon Episcopal School, Portland
- The Overlake School, Redmond

=== P ===
- Park City Day School, Park City, Utah
- The Perkins School, Seattle
- Portland Jewish Academy

=== R ===
- Riverstone International School, Boise, Idaho
- Rowland Hall, Salt Lake City

=== S ===
- Sage Ridge School, Reno, Nevada
- Saint George's School, Spokane, Washington
- Seabury School, Tacoma
- Seattle Academy of Arts and Sciences
- Seattle Country Day School
- Seattle Girls' School
- Seattle Hebrew Academy
- Seattle Jewish Community School
- Spruce Street School, Seattle
- St. Thomas School, Medina, Washington

=== T ===
- The Sage School, Hailey, Idaho
- Trillium Academy, Seattle, Washington

=== U ===
- University Child Development School, Seattle
- University Prep, Seattle

=== V ===
- Villa Academy, Seattle

=== W ===
- Wasatch Academy, Mount Pleasant, Utah
- The Waterford School, Sandy, Utah
- Westside School, Seattle
- Woodinville Montessori School, Woodinville, Washington
- Willows Preparatory School, Redmond, Washington
