= The Overlake School =

Location
- 20301 NE 108th Street; Union Hill, Washington 98053; United States; 47.6938°N 122.0702°W

Information
- Type: Private
- Established: 1967; 59 years ago
- Founder: Charles Clarke
- Head of school: Gretchen Warner
- Faculty: 70.1 (on an FTE basis)
- Grades: 5–12
- Enrollment: 546 (2023–24)
- Student to teacher ratio: 7.9
- Campus size: 75 acres
- Campus type: Suburban
- Colors: Green and Gold
- Slogan: Excellentiam Inspirare
- Mascot: Owl
- Yearbook: The Overlake Odyssey
- Endowment: $28 million (as of 2023)
- Website: www.overlake.org

The Overlake School is a grades 5–12 private, non-sectarian, co-educational, college preparatory school in Redmond, Washington, United States that was founded in 1967 by Charles Clarke.

== History ==
The original campus was located at the Redwood Manor by Marymoor Park. It was soon relocated to the basement of the Eastside YMCA. In 1972, Dean Palmer moved the school to its current location in Redmond.

The campus was originally a farm, and Overlake retrofitted a barn to facilitate its needs with the help of students. Overlake currently occupies 75 acres (0.30 km^{2}). In addition to the main school buildings, the school's property also includes the headmaster's home, a parent center (formerly a neighbor's property), several athletic fields, and a ropes course.

In 2008 the Outdoor Wise Learning Spaces (OWLS) were created as a way to take advantage of the campus's expansive undeveloped acreage. But rather than clearing and developing those spaces, OWLS uses the property's signature rural nature for new outdoor learning spaces. The installations include an outdoor classroom, a fitness course, and a student art gallery; a weather station providing real-time readings online; and a 2.5-mile system of five trails, varying in length and difficulty, each including interpretive signs and trail marker posts.

The humanities building was reconstructed and opened for classes in the spring of 2009. The Technology/Language Center was rebuilt and finished completion in the summer of 2011. The Fifth and Sixth Grade Center was the final building to be redone and was also completed in 2011. In addition, the new Whitten Math and Science Center was completed in 2021. In 2023, the school reported an endowment of $28 million.

== Academics ==
Overlake offers honors tracks in Science, Math, English and History. Most students take more than one of the fourteen Advanced Placement courses offered in their junior and senior years. Students can study Spanish, French, Mandarin Chinese and Latin from sixth grade onward; at least three years of one language are required to graduate. Students are also given the opportunity to travel to a native country of the language they are studying during Project Week in high school. Overlake offers humanities electives, including "Ethnic Studies", "The Cold War", "Tell Me a Story: The Power of Stories in Human Experience", "Seriously Funny: The Rhetoric of Humor". Other electives span the sciences, including computer science. Many other electives for other courses are available as well. 17 APs are offered in total.

== Athletics ==
Overlake competes in the Emerald Sound 1A League of the Washington Interscholastic Activities Association (WIAA).

=== State championships ===
- Boys' golf: 2006
- Boys Baseball: 2024
- Girls' golf: 2000, 2001, 2002, 2008, 2024
- Boys' tennis: 2003, 2006, 2025
- Girls' tennis: 2010, 2017, 2024, 2025, 2026
- Boys' soccer: 1993, 1996, 2012, 2017, 2018, 2024
- Girls' soccer: 2016
- Boys' lacrosse: 2009 (Division II, not a WIAA sanctioned sport)
- Girls' lacrosse: 1999 (not a WIAA sanctioned sport)

== Performing arts ==
The theatre department at The Overlake School has grown substantially since the addition of The Fulton Performing Arts Center in 2002. Since then, the school has put on two to three performances per year. In 2005 the school became host for the August portion of the Seattle Chamber Music Society's summer festival of chamber music.

Beginning in 2007, the school began to submit their theatre productions to the 5th Avenue Theatre High School Musical Awards program. The Fulton Performing Arts Center also houses the school's choir groups, orchestra, concert band, and jazz band.

== Global service programs ==
In 2002, members of the Overlake community raised the funds to construct an elementary school in rural Pailin, Cambodia. This school serves students from pre-kindergarten through sixth grade. Beginning in 2003 and continuing every other year, the school has sent groups of fifteen to twenty students to Pailin to teach classes and connect with students. The participants in these trips have installed computers and internet on the campus and constructed a playground.

The Overlake School has also sent students on service trips to Ghana and Uruguay, and to play baseball and participate in community service in the Dominican Republic.

== Notable alumni ==
- Carrie Brownstein ('92), singer/guitarist for band Sleater-Kinney, singer/guitarist for now-defunct Wild Flag, and co-star of IFC sketch series Portlandia
- Jay Stamper ('90), Democratic candidate for the United States Senate in South Carolina
