= Seattle Academy of Arts and Sciences =

Private secondary school in Seattle, Washington

Coordinates: 47°36′50″N 122°18′45″W

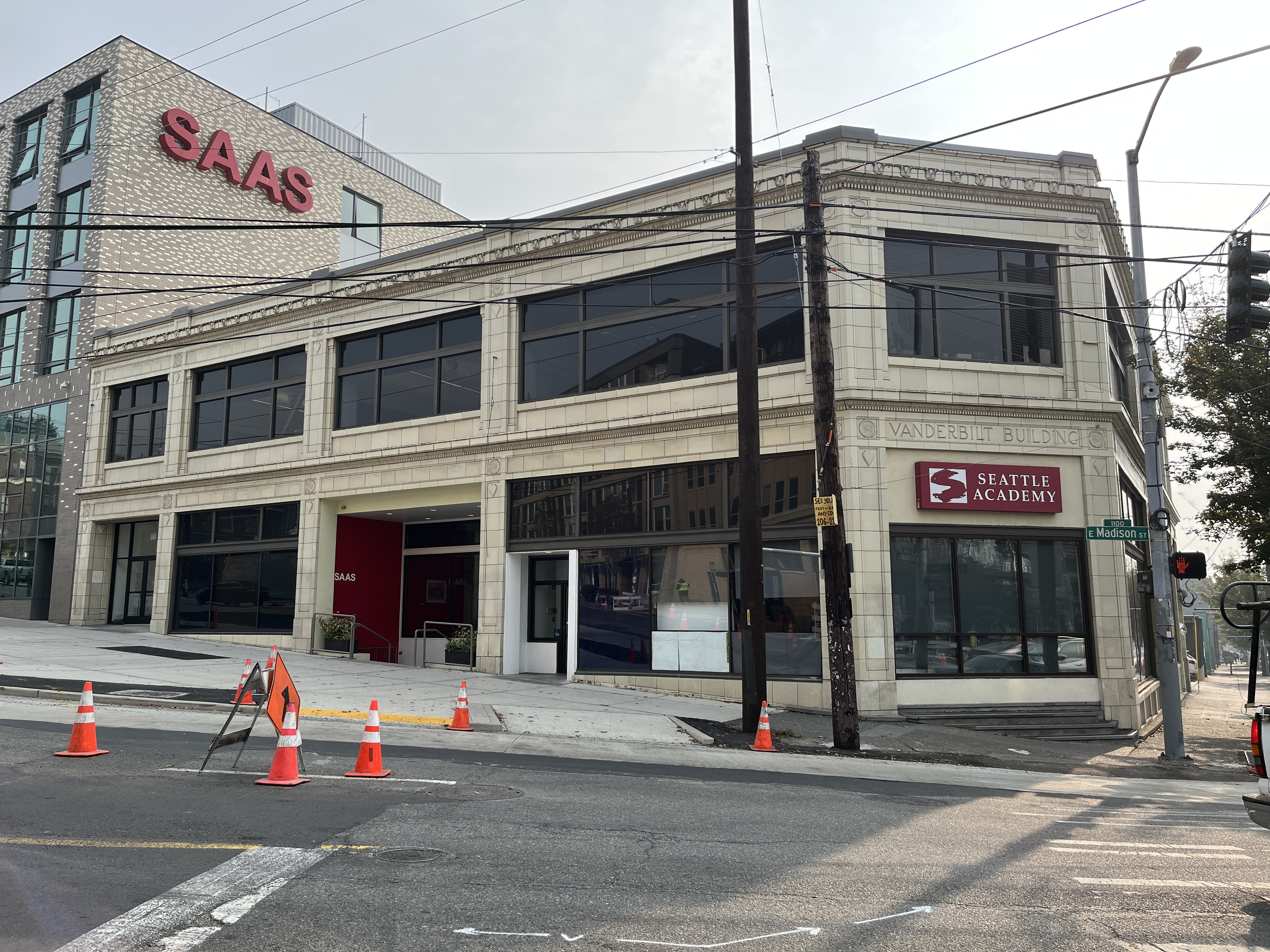
- The Vanderbilt Building in 2022
- 1201 E. Union; Seattle, Washington; United States

Information
- Type: Private
- Established: 1983
- Locale: Urban
- Head of school: Rob Phillips, Giselle Furlonge
- Faculty: 291
- Grades: 6–12
- Enrollment: 1358
- Color
- Mascot: Cardinal
- Tuition: US$52,940
- Website: seattleacademy.org

Seattle Academy of Arts and Sciences (commonly known as Seattle Academy or SAAS) is a mixed-sex education private school serving grades 6–12 in the Capitol Hill neighborhood of Seattle, Washington, United States. Founded in 1983, the school serves middle and upper school students on an urban campus in Seattle. As of 2026-2027 school year, there are 1,358 students at SAAS, and the student-teacher ratio is 8:1.

== History ==
Seattle Academy was founded in 1983 by a group of students, parents, trustees, and teachers associated with Northwest School who had concerns regarding the school's financial viability.

As of 2026, the campus had expanded to consists of seven main buildings located within the Capitol Hill neighborhood. In 2017 the school began construction of a $48 million, five-story middle school building, and in 2025 opened the school building.

== Governance ==
Seattle Academy is governed by a board of trustees. The school has a 21-member board, which consists of current parents, alumni parents and alumni of the school. As of 2026 the head of the schools are Rob Phillips and Giselle Furlonge.

== Extracurricular activities ==
As of 2025-2026 school year, Seattle Academy has 64 Upper School clubs and 20 Middle School clubs.

Notable teams and their accomplishments (from the 2024-25 school year) include:

- Mock Trial: 10 members of the Model UN team received awards.
- Robotics: 2 FIRST Robotics Competition awards were granted to the SAASquatch robotics team.
- Ethics Bowl: 3 students on the Ethics Bowl team won the Civil Dialogue Award at the State competition.

== Campus ==
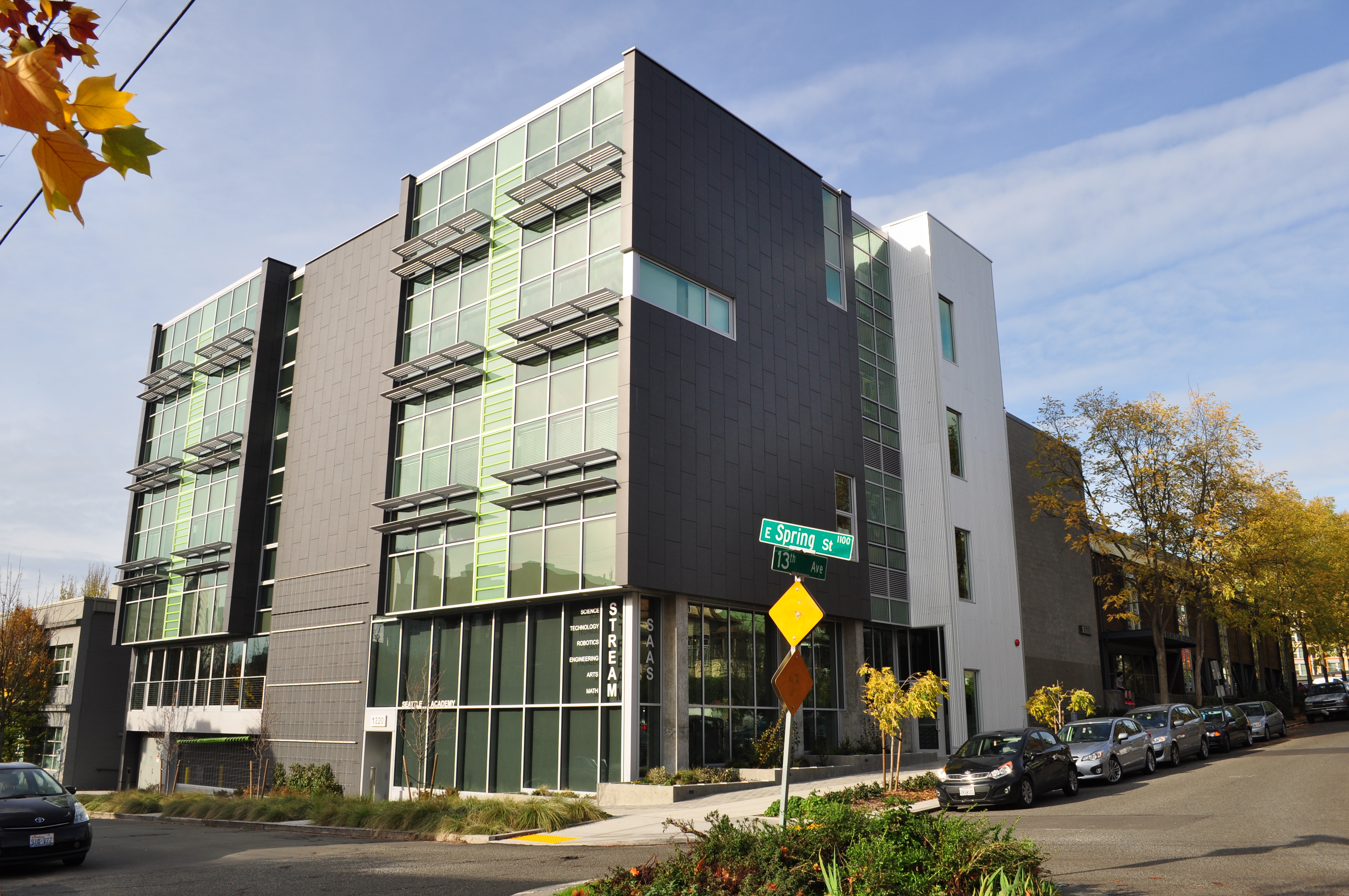
Seattle Academy STREAM Building

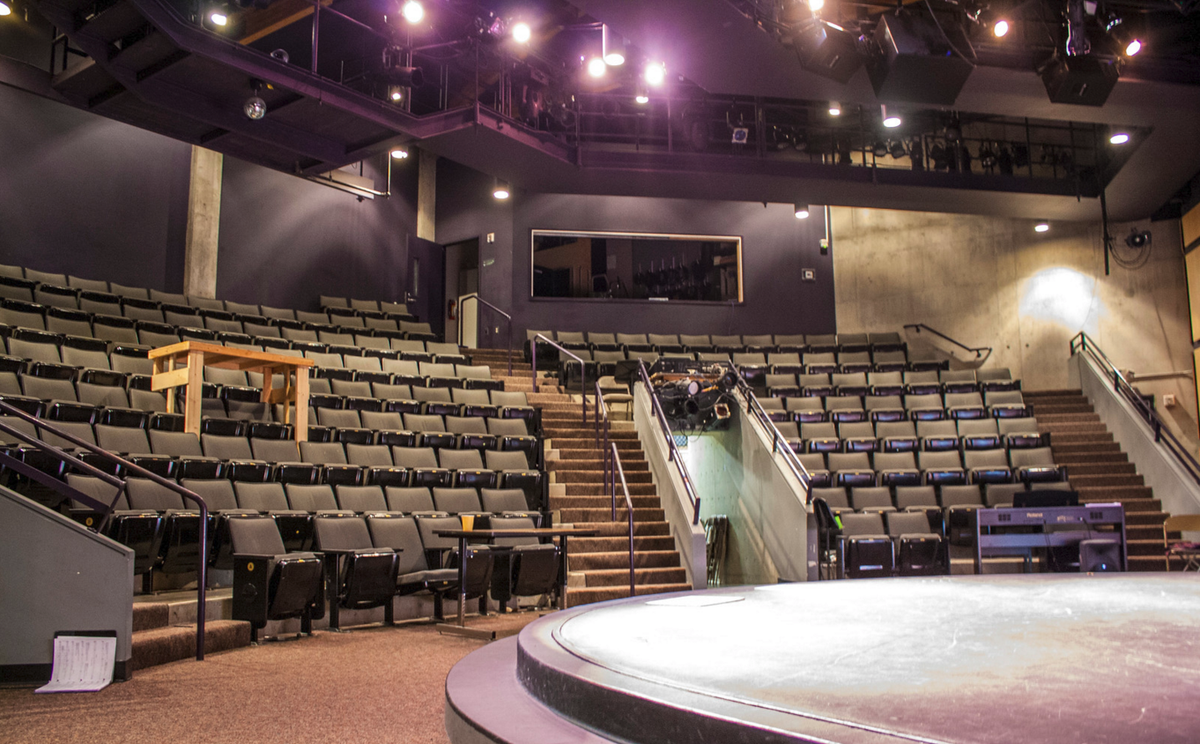
Seattle Academy Orvis Theater

Seattle Academy's campus consists of seven main buildings located within a single block in the Capitol Hill neighborhood. Campus facilities include middle and upper school academic buildings, athletic facilities, arts spaces, and instructional spaces for science and technology programs.

Major facilities include the five-story, 105,000-square-foot Upper School building, the Arts Center, which houses the 250-seat Orvis Theater, athletic facilities, and the STREAM building, which contains science and technology classrooms and laboratories. The campus also includes a rooftop playfield above the Middle School gym.

== Awards and recognition ==
As of 2026, school review website Niche gives SAAS an A+ Overall Niche Grade, with strengths in Academics, College Prep, and Diversity. Niche ranks SAAS as #2 Best High School for the Arts in Washington, #12 Best Private High School in Washington, and #12 Best College Prep Private High School in Washington.

== Former headteachers ==
- Jean Orvis (1983–2009)
- Joe Puggelli (2009–2018)
- Rob Phillips (2018–As of 2026)
- Giselle Furlonge (co-head, 2025–As of 2026)
