= Washington Federation of Independent Schools =

- Abbreviation: WFIS
- Formation: February 12, 1969
- Type: Non-governmental organization
- Purpose: Educational accreditation
- Region served: Washington state
- Executive director: Suzie Hanson
- Parent organization: Council of American Private Education
- Affiliations: Northwest Association of Independent Schools
- Website: wfis.org

The Washington Federation of Independent Schools (WFIS) is an umbrella organization of private and independent schools in the U.S. state of Washington, informally representing Washington in the Office of Private Education.

== Purpose ==
As laid out by the executives of the federation, the goals of WFIS are:

1. To promote the vital role of private schools in Washington education and their significant contributions to educating the public and promoting the common good.
2. To promote the rights of parents to educate their children in the schools of their choice.
3. To encourage excellence and pluralism in education, and to promote the rights of private schools to fulfill their unique missions.
4. To foster the participation of the private school community in shaping the state's education agenda, and to develop and promote positions on educational policy.
5. To assure equitable access to all services to which private schools are entitled, while allowing them to maintain their independence.
