= National Association of Independent Schools =

American ccreditation organization for independent schools

- Abbreviation: NAIS
- Type: Non-governmental organization
- Purpose: K-12 education
- Website: www.nais.org

The National Association of Independent Schools (NAIS) is an American membership organization for private, nonprofit, K-12 schools. Founded in 1962, NAIS represents independent schools and associations in the United States, including day, boarding, and day/boarding schools; elementary and secondary schools; boys', girls', and coeducational schools. NAIS also has affiliate members internationally.

== Membership ==
As of October 2024, NAIS represented approximately 1,700 member independent schools and associations in the United States, serving more than 738,000 students and 63,000 teachers. Membership in NAIS is open to independent pre-college schools operated by nonprofit organizations. To become a full member of NAIS, a school must have operated for at least five years and must be accredited by an accrediting organization approved by NAIS.

== Accreditation criteria ==
Over the course of a 10-year cycle, associations prepare a self-study demonstrating compliance with the Criteria for Effective Independent School Accreditation Practices. The criteria provide common ground for member associations by delineating best practices, policies, and procedures. In addition, associations use the Model Core Standards—a set of "ideal" standards—in assessing their own standards.

As part of the process of "accrediting the accreditors," each member association:

- Hosts a visit from a team composed of commission members;
- Receives written recommendations from the commission; and
- Engages in follow-up activities to improve the state or regional accreditation process.

Accountability serves two purposes: ongoing association improvement and advancement.

== Background ==
=== History ===
The NAIS was organized in 1962, the result of the merger of the Independent Schools Education Board and the National Council of Independent Schools.

In response to requests from several state, regional, and national accrediting organizations, the NAIS commission on accreditation was established by the NAIS Board of Trustees in 2001 and convened for the first time in 2002. The 19 member commission's work was intended to assure the quality of independent school accrediting programs. The commission's primary responsibility was to develop a public understanding of and credibility for state and regional accrediting programs. In addition, the commission developed criteria for effective independent school accreditation practices, standards, and successful accreditation policy and procedure models and engaged in research to inform accreditation practice. It was composed of members from state and regional accrediting associations that were members of NAIS, at-large members, and NAIS Board members.

The NAIS commission on accreditation disbanded in 2018. The successor organization, the International Council Advancing Independent School Accreditation (ICAISA), began formal operations in 2018 as an independent 501(c)(3) organization.

=== Organizational structure ===
The NAIS board of trustees comprises sixteen members, led by the officers and the executive committee. Board members serve three-year terms. The board appoints the NAIS president, who oversees association business with the aid of a small staff.

Over the course of a 10-year cycle, associations prepared a self-study demonstrating compliance with the Criteria for Effective Independent School Accreditation Practices. The criteria provided common ground for member associations by delineating best practices, policies, and procedures. In addition, associations used Model Core Standards – a set of “ideal” standards — in assessing their own standards. As part of "accrediting the accreditors", each member association hosts a visit from other accredited association members, receives written recommendations, and engages in follow-up activities to improve the state or regional accreditation process. As with school accreditation, this served two purposes: institutional improvement and quality assurance.

== See also ==
- Canadian Accredited Independent Schools, formerly Standards in Excellence And Learning (SEAL)
- Education in the United States
