= MVK Zrt. =

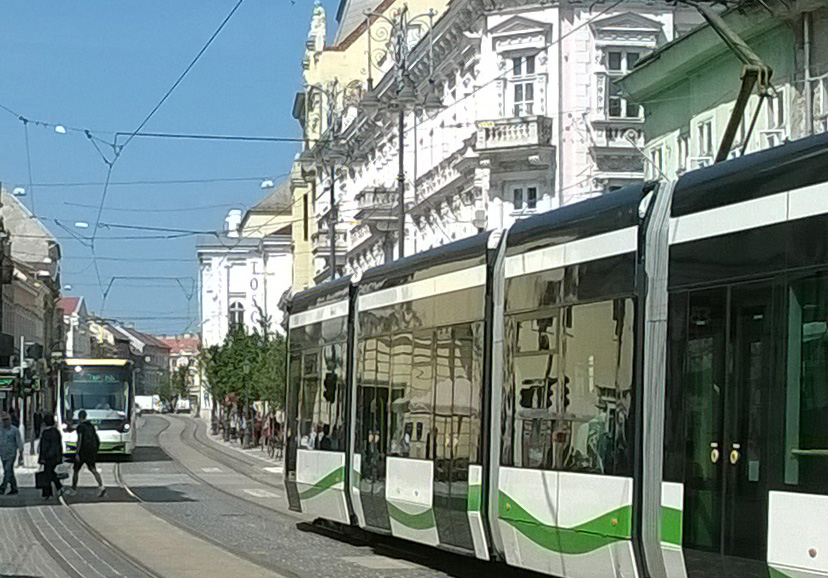
Trams 1 and 2 on the Main Street

MVK Zrt. (Hungarian: Miskolc Városi Közlekedési Zrt., pronounced [ˈmiʃkolt͡s ˈvaːroʃi ˈkøzlɛkɛdeːʃi ˈzeːjɛrteː]; Mass Transport co. ltd. of the City of Miskolc; previously MVK Rt.) is the name of the transport company of the city of Miskolc, Hungary. Unlike the transport companies of many other cities, MVK Zrt. is independent from the company responsible for municipal transport in the county (Volánbusz) and is responsible only for the mass transportation in Miskolc and the nearby town Felsőzsolca. The buses are usually dark blue; the trams on Line 1 are yellow or red, on Line 2 are dark red. Miskolc has recently invested much in its public transportation. By the year 2016 90% of the company's vehicles will be low-floor.

Miskolc has a long history of mass transport. The first tramway was built in 1897, and Miskolc was the first Hungarian city to have a scheduled bus line in 1903. Today Miskolc is one of only six Hungarian cities that have its own mass transport company. The city has two railway stations (Tiszai and Gömöri) and an unpaved airport which is not open to the public and plays no role in mass transport. There is also a narrow-gauge railway line between Miskolc and Lillafüred, but it has no importance other than being a tourist attraction.

== History of mass transport in Miskolc ==
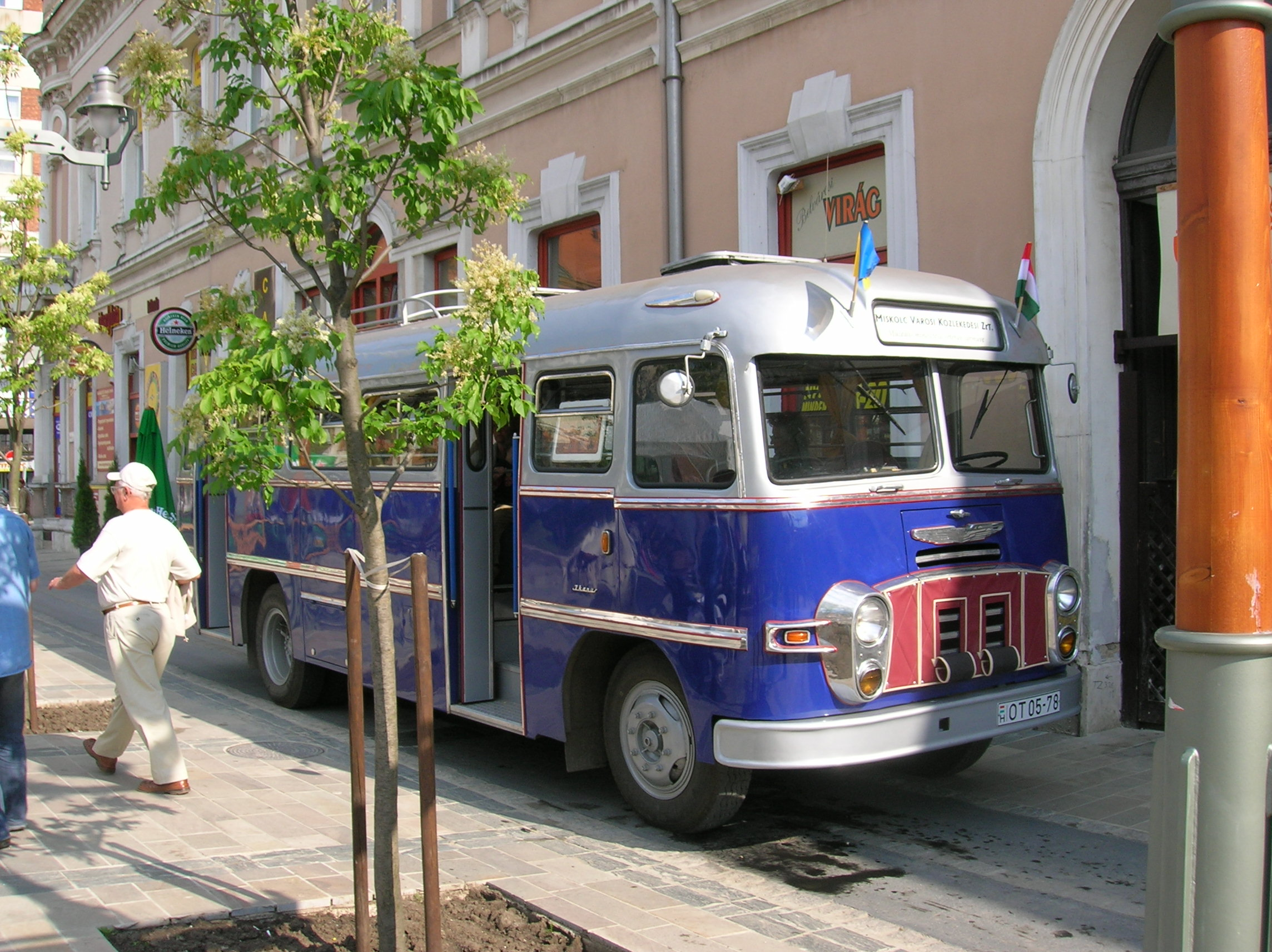
Ikarus 31-type nostalgia bus from 1959; restored museum-piece

The need for Miskolc having mass transport emerged in the middle of the 19th century. By this time the city had more than 30.000 residents, the railway line reached Miskolc in 1859 but the railway station was at that time quite far (2.2 km) from the city proper; the metal factory of Diósgyőr was opened in 1868, and Tapolca was fast becoming a popular tourist destination. In the 1860s it was planned to build the tram line between the factory and the railway station underground, but sufficient funds were lacking. Had it been carried out, it would have been the first underground railway in Hungary.

From 1862 horse-drawn omnibuses ran between the railway station and Diósgyőr, later between downtown and Tapolca. The leaders of the city started to plan having tram lines in 1895. The project was led by dr. István Csáthy Szabó. According to the first plans the tramway line would have been 20 kilometres long, from Tiszai station to the other end of Diósgyőr, but the ministry agreed to finance only the construction of a 7 km-long line.

The first tram entered service on July 10, 1897. It ran between Tiszai Railway Station and St. Anne's Church and stopped at 8 termini, including the two end termini. The tram line in Miskolc was the fourth one built in Hungary – after the tram lines in Budapest (1887), Pozsony (today in Slovakia; 1895) and Szombathely (May 1897; demolished since then) –, the third one in present-day Hungary and the second normal-gauge tram line (those in Pozsony and Szombathely were narrow-gauge). The tram stopped six times between its two end stations. On the 1st day 7615 passengers used it, which met the expectations. (Today 90,000 passengers use only the two tram lines daily; there are 430.000 trips on all bus and tram lines combined.) The tram was operated by MVV Rt. (Miskolci Villamossági Rt.; Electric Company of Miskolc.) Because of the success of the first tram line, a second tramway was built perpendicular to the first one, between Búza tér and Népkert. This line was much less popular and because of it after four months of operating MVV Rt. asked the city council to agree to demolish this tramway, but it didn't happen until 1960.

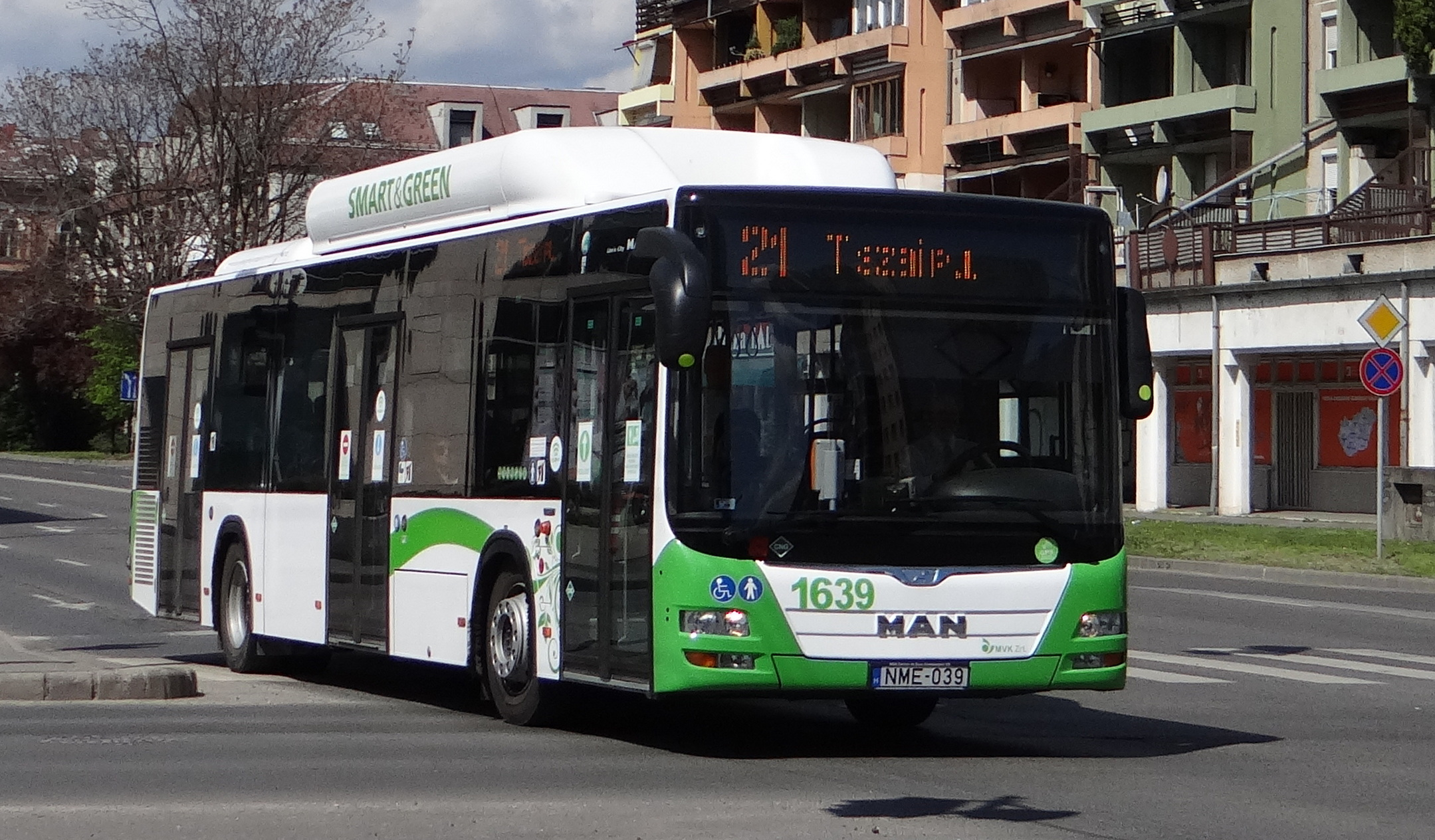
MAN Lion's City CNG

On June 8, 1903 a citizen called Mrs. Gyula Bene launched the first scheduled bus line between the city halls of Miskolc and Diósgyőr. However, the tram was still very popular, and the bus couldn't compete with that, so the bus line was abolished.

Until 1947 the operator of trams, MVV Rt. was the same company that provided electricity for Miskolc. This was not always a fortunate situation. In the 1920s the leaders of the city wanted to start bus traffic but MVV Rt. was afraid of competition and threatened to raise the price of electricity so they changed their minds.

Meanwhile, the workers of the metal factory of Diósgyőr expressed their need for the tramway line to reach the factory. With the financial help of the state and the factory a new tramway was built from Miskolc to Diósgyőr. To operate it a new company was founded, the Miskolc-Diósgyőr Municipal Railway Company (MDV Rt.). (Since Diósgyőr was not part of Miskolc at that time, the state allowed it to be operated only as a municipal railway, not as a tram.) There were plans to unify the two tram lines so that people would not have to change when going from the railway station to Diósgyőr, but MVV Rt. saw MDV Rt. as a competition and did not agree. Later MDV Rt. gave up its right to operate its tram line, because of their lack of experience of operating tram lines, and MVV Rt. took over. By January 22, 1906 the two tram lines were united and one could travel from Tiszai station to Diósgyőr without changing trams.

In 1910 the second tramway line was extended to the nearby town Hejőcsaba. Tapolca was connected to Miskolc by bus line by 1926 and Lillafüred, by 1928.

During World War II the tramways were damaged, and tram traffic completely stopped by 1942.

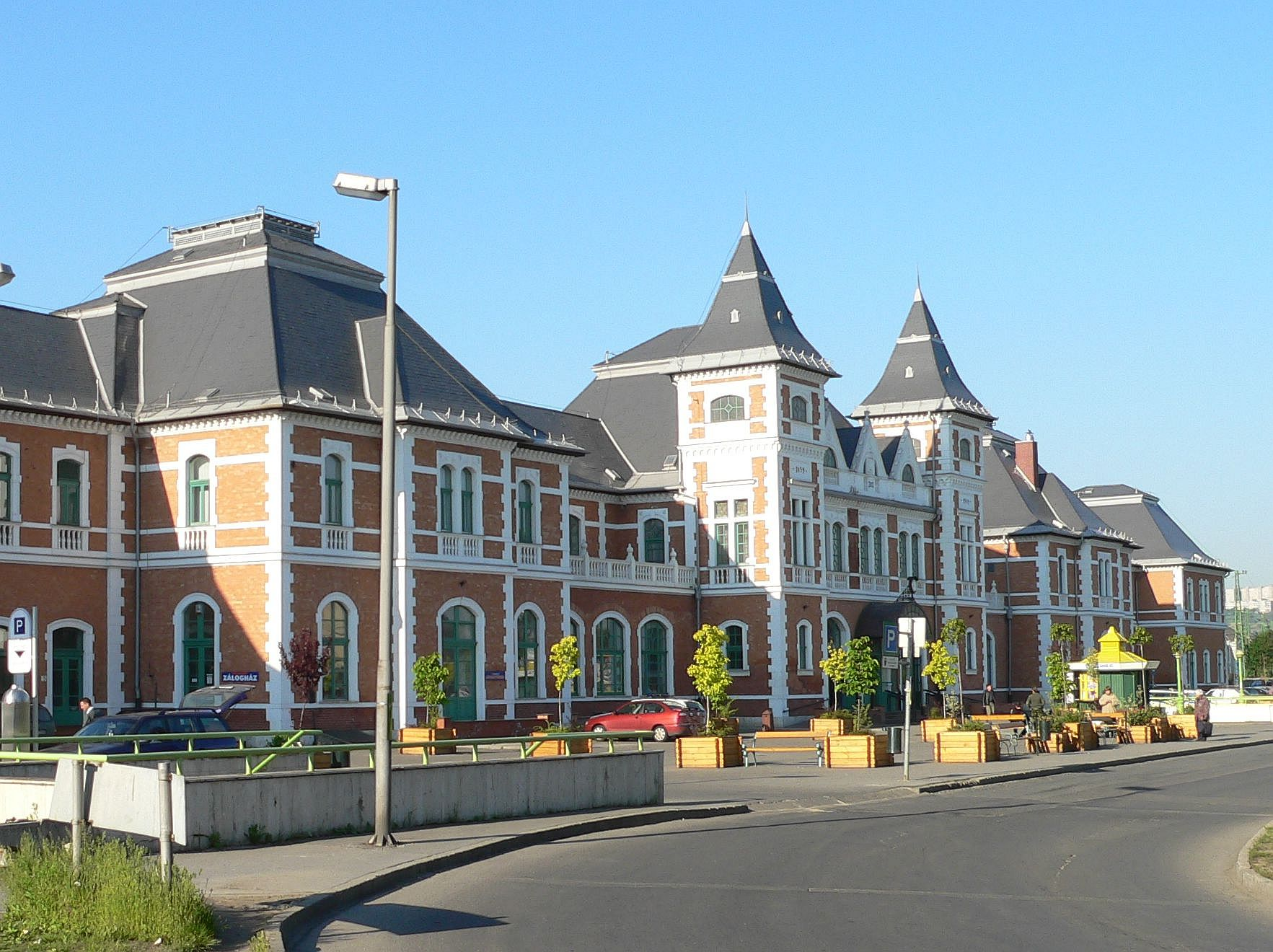
Miskolc Tiszai Central Station

In 1945 Miskolc, Diósgyőr and Hejőcsaba was unified to form Greater Miskolc. The tram lines, which connected the three towns decades before their unification, played an important role in this. Görömböly, Tapolca and Lillafüred, which were connected to Miskolc by bus lines, were annexed to the city five years later.

After the war scheduled buses began serve the city in 1948. To operate the bus lines a new company was founded in 1949, and in 1954 it was united with MVV Rt., forming MKV (Miskolci Közlekedési Vállalat; Mass Transport Company of Miskolc.) In 1951 there were already five bus lines. The company was re-organised asa public company in 1994.

During its long history Miskolc had the most residents in the 1980s; as the country's second-largest city and an important centre of heavy industry, it had more than 200.000 inhabitants. It is no surprise that the mass transport company set its records during that decade: in 1988 its 274 buses and 44 trams carried 198.7 million passengers.

In 1971 the company changed its policy of having a conductor on each vehicle, but too many people decided to take free rides, causing financial loss to the company, so in 1996 MVK Rt. answered with the much criticised move of ordering bus drivers to only open the first door and check if passengers have a ticket.

Compared to mass transport of other cities, the situation in Miskolc is quite good. On an average day 150 buses stop at a bus stop, and buses follow each other in eight-minute intervals.

In 2005 the company changed its name from "public company" to "private limited company" in accord with a new law which required all share companies choose between the company forms "public limited" and "private limited".

== Vehicles ==
The company owns 192 buses (128 of which are articulated buses and only 51 of them are regular buses) and 44 trams (as of 2011). There are 47 bus lines (including night lines) and 2 tram lines. Mainly because of geographical reasons articulated buses don't serve on the following lines: 3A, 5, 11, 15, 19, 24, 33, 34, 38, 67, 68, 69. Line 24 is exclusively served by low-floor buses.

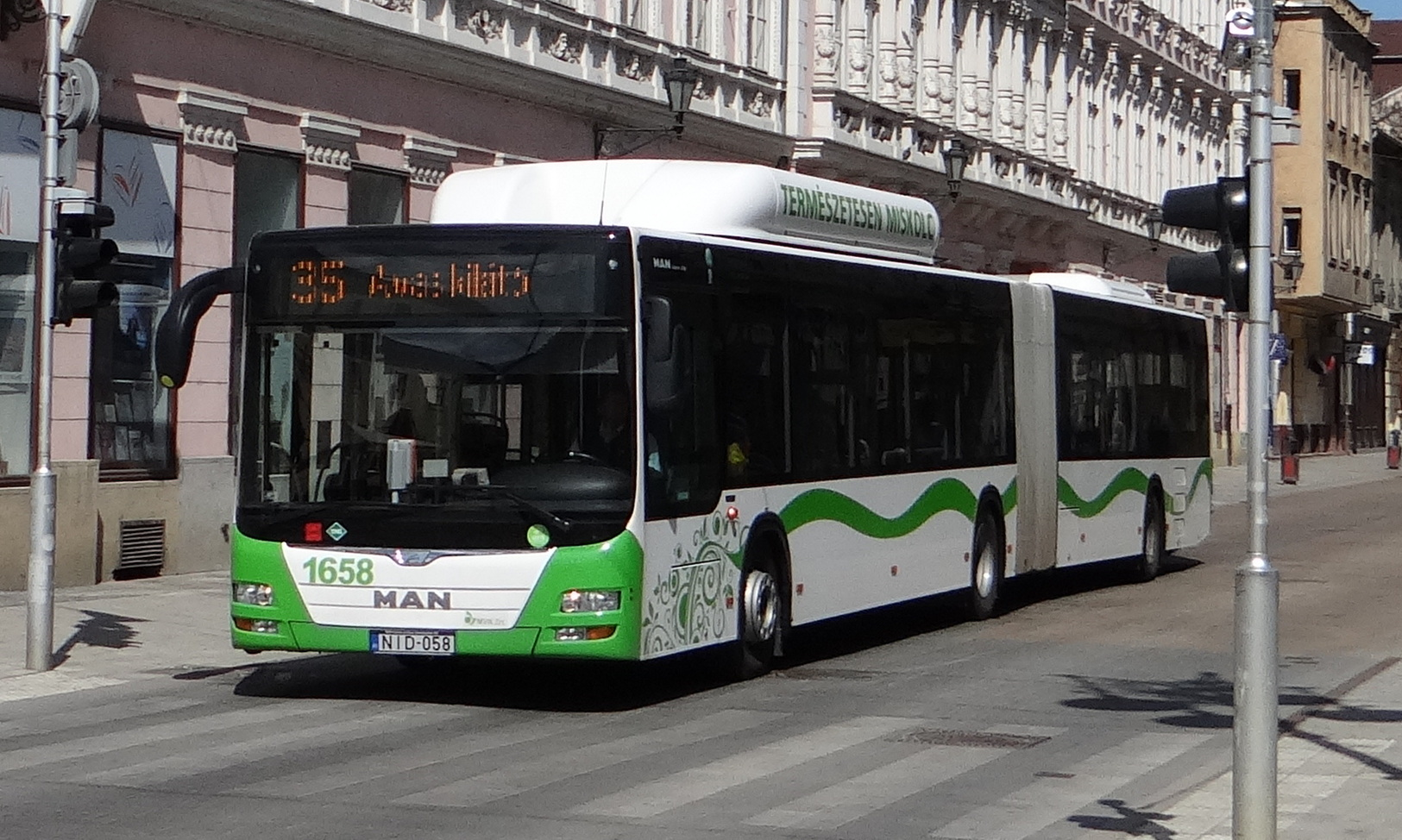
MAN Lion's City CNG Articulated Bus

=== Buses ===
- 1 Ikarus 31 (nostalgia bus, built in 1959)
- 1 Ikarus 250 (not in regular service, except in winters on the Diósgyőr–Bánkút line)
- 1 Ikarus 260 (nostalgia bus)
- 1 Ikarus 280 (nostalgia articulated bus)
- 5 Enterprise Plasma midi bus (low-floor bus)
- 6 MAN NL 223 (low-floor bus)
- 35 Neoplan Centroliner N4522 (articulated low-floor bus)
- 1 MAN RH-413 (not in regular service)
- 40 MAN Lion's City A21 CNG (low-floor bus)
- 35 MAN Lion's City GL A40 CNG (articulated low-floor bus)

By 2016 the company wants to change all of its buses to new CNG (compressed natural gas) buses except for the Neoplan and MAN brand buses. After the investment 80% of the buses would be low-floor buses.

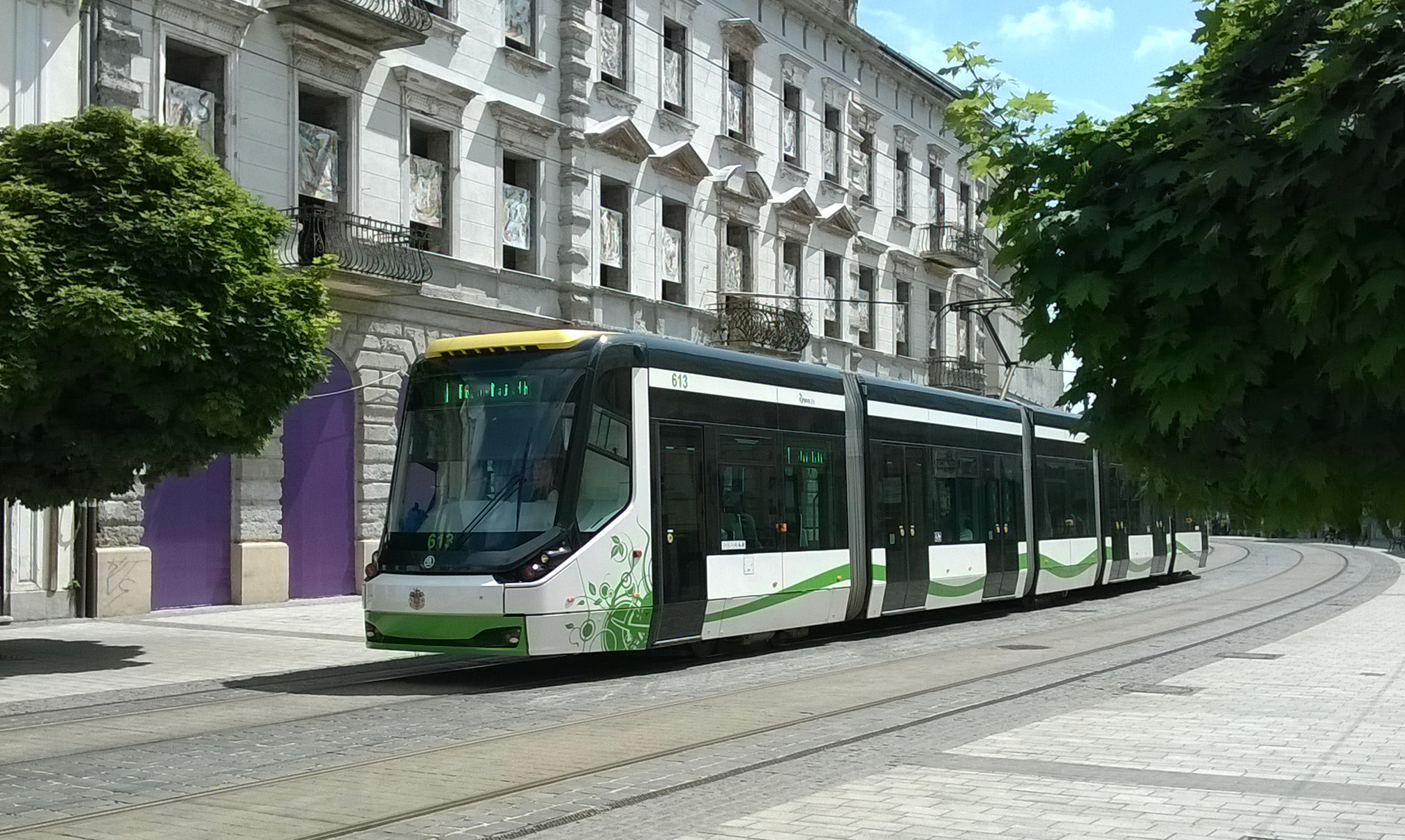
Skoda 26 tram

=== Trams ===
- 31 Škoda 26 T(articulated low-floor tram)
- 6 CKD Tatra KT8D5 (retired, but stored as operational spares)
- 1 Ganz HCS-3 No.100 (nostalgia tram; built in 1962)
- 1 Ganz HCS-10 No.151 (nostalgia tram, built in 1973)
- 1 Siemens E1 No.199 (nostalgia tram; built in 1969, withdrawn in 2015)
- 1 Lohner c3 No.300 (nostalgia tram trailer; built in 1962)
- 1 M5 (snow sweeper)

The tram fleet is 100% low-floor, with the exception of the nostalgia trams.

=== Bus Routes ===
The new timetable: (01. jan. 2013)

- 1: Tiszai Railway Station – Majális Park (40 min)
- 2: Búza Square – Tapolca (23 min)
- 3: Búza Square – Szirma (20 min) *occasionally via Auchan South
- 3A: Búza Square – Berzsenyi Dániel str. (12 min)
- 4: Búza Square – Görömböly (24 min)
- 5: Diósgyőr – Lillafüred (12 min)
- 6: Újgyőr Main Square – Pereces (18 min)
- 7: Búza Square – Felsőzsolca (21 min) *occasionally via Auchan Borsod
- 8: Airport – Meat Industry Complex (20 min)
- 9: Újgyőr Main Square – Ferenc Tokaji street (11 min)
- 11: Búza Square – Bábonyibérc (17 min)
- 12: Airport – University Town (27 min)
- 14: Airport – Hejő Park (27-31 min)
- 14Y: Airport – Búza square - Hejő Park (27 min)
- 15: Felső-Majláth – Ómassa (23 min)
- 16: Újgyőr Main Square – Mine Complex (Lyukóbánya-Mine) (20 min)
- 19: Újgyőr Main Square – Komlóstető (11 min)
- 20: Airport/BOSCH – Miskolctapolca Cavebath (36 min) *occasionally via University
- 21: Tiszai Railway Station – /Glass Industry/ – Kálmán Kandó str. (35 min) *occasionally via Lidl
- 101B: György Szondi Str. – Diósgyőr (34 min)
- 22: City Centre (downtown) – University Town (only during the school year) (17 min)
- 24: Airport – SzinvaPark (11 min)
- 28: Búza square – Tampere district (10-12 min)
- 29: Újgyőr Main Square – Avas Lookout Tower (28 min) *occasionally via University
- 30: Tiszai Railway Station – /Saint George street/ – Avas Lookout Tower (28 min)
- 31: Tiszai Railway Station – /Avas Centre/ – Avas Lookout Tower (24-27 min)
- 32: Avas Lookout Tower – Gömöri Railway Station (24 min)
- 34: Avas Lookout Tower – Bodótető (30 min)
- 35: Avas Lookout Tower – City Centre (downtown) (15 min)
- 35R: Avas Lookout Tower – /Saint George street/ – City Centre (downtown) – Airport
- 38: Avas Lookout Tower – Malomszög street (6 min)
- 43: Búza square – Joyson (24 min)
- 44: City Centre (downtown) – Auchan Miskolc South Hypermarket / Joyson (22 min)
- 45: Búza Square – Auchan Miskolc South Hypermarket (31 min)
- 53: Majális Park – South Industrial Park JOYSON (35 min)
- 54: Airport – Felső-Majláth (34 min)
- 67: Újgyőr Main Square – Lomb str. (9 min)
- 68: Újgyőr Main Square – Bükkszentlászló (19 min)
- 69: Felső-Majláth – Berekalja - Castle of Diósgyőr (8 min)
- 240: Airport/BOSCH – Mechatronics Industrial Park (5 min)
- 280: Búza Square – Tampere District
- Auchan 1: City Centre (downtown) – Auchan Miskolc Hypermarket (free) (17 min)
- Auchan 2: Auchan Miskolc South Hypermarket – Avas Lookout Tower (free) (19 min)
- TESCO Avas: Avas Lookout Tower – TESCO Hypermarket Avas (free) (10 min)
- ME: Tiszai Railway Station – University Town (only during the school year) (19 min)
- Sí: Diósgyőr – Bánkút ski resort (winter only) (~54 min)

Night routes

- 35R: Avas Lookout Tower – /Saint George str./ – /City Centre (downtown)/ – Airport
- 1É: Szondi Gy. str. – Újgyőri Main Square
- 1YÉ: Szondi Gy. str. – /City centre (downtown)/ – Újgyőri Main Square
- 20G: Szondi Gy. str. – University Colleges

=== Tram Routes ===
- 1V Tiszai Railway Station – Felső-Majláth (35 min)
- 2V Tiszai Railway Station – Ironworks (25 min)

== Fares ==
=== Tickets ===
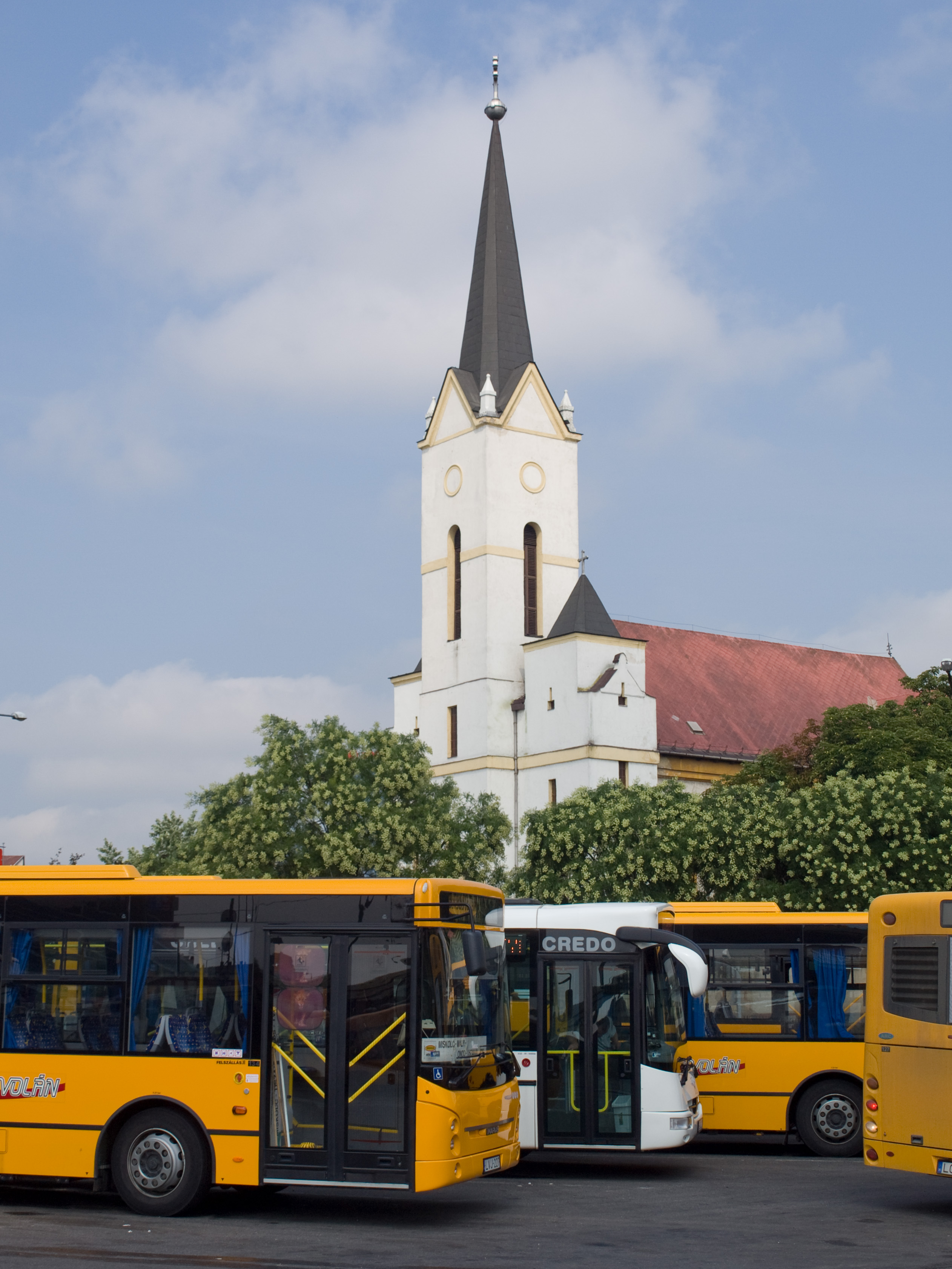
Buses parking at the Regional Bus station in Miskolc

(Valid only within the administrative borders of Miskolc)

- Ticket: 300 Ft
- Ticket (when bought on vehicle): 700 Ft
- Ten tickets: 2.800 Ft
- Ticket for all lines, valid for 1 day: 1.600 Ft
- Tourist ticket (for all lines, 3 days): 3.000 Ft
- Tourist ticket (for all lines, 7 days): 3.900 Ft
- Family ticket (weekends only): 2.900 Ft
- If you have Miskolc Pass Tourist Card, travel is for free for the duration of the card.

=== One-month or 30-day season tickets ===
(Valid only within the administrative borders of Miskolc)

There are two types of season tickets: valid for one calendar month (until the fifth of the next month) or valid for 30 days, counting from the day it was bought or a day specified by the buyer.

- Tram season ticket: 4.700 Ft
- Tram season ticket for students and pensioners: 2.900 Ft
- Bus season ticket for one bus line: 4.700 Ft
- Bus & tram season ticket: 7.000 Ft
- Bus & tram season ticket for students and pensioners: 3.900 Ft
- Season ticket without photo ID: 27.000 Ft

=== Season tickets for longer period ===
All are valid for all lines.

- One year (with photo ID): 77.000 Ft
- One year (without photo ID): 297.000 Ft

=== Tickets for Buses 7 and 7/2 ===
(Valid for the bus lines between Miskolc and the town of Felsőzsolca)

Single-fare tickets cost the same as for city buses.

- Season ticket for Bus 7: 8.200 Ft
- Season ticket for Bus 7 (pensioners): 3.100 Ft
- Season ticket for Bus 7/2: 5.800 Ft
- Season ticket for Bus 7/2 (pensioners): 1.200 Ft

Traveling is free for children under 6, blind persons, Hungarian citizens above 65, Hungarians from neighbouring countries, war invalids, war widows, members of parliament, employees of the traffic administration office. Only leashed dogs may also be taken on the city buses; they pay the same fare as their owners (except police and guide dogs, who ride for free). All season tickets are 10% cheaper for holders of a Miskolc Card, which can be bought by anyone with a permanent residence in the city.

MVK Zrt. has seven ticket offices in the city (Tiszai Station, Búza Square, Uitz Street, Újgyőr Main Square, Diósgyőr, Avas City Centre, Airport) but single-fare tickets can also be bought elsewhere (e.g. newsstands and on the vehicles).

== Special service ==
The company had operated two express lines, lines 101 and 101B, from Tiszai station to Diósgyőr, but due to economical reasons they were suspended at the end of 2006. They made fewer stops than buses on line no 1. However from January 1, 2020 the line is again in operation. Line 21B was extended, and was renamed 101B.

During the International Opera Festival of Miskolc the company operates a nostalgia tram which stops before the theatre and is free for those who have a theatre ticket for that day.

== Sources ==
- MVK Zrt. official site
- Fejezetek Miskolc történetéből (ed. Dezső Bekes, László Veres. Miskolc, 1984. p. 94.) ISBN 963-03-1973-X
