= Trams in Miskolc =

Miskolc tramway network
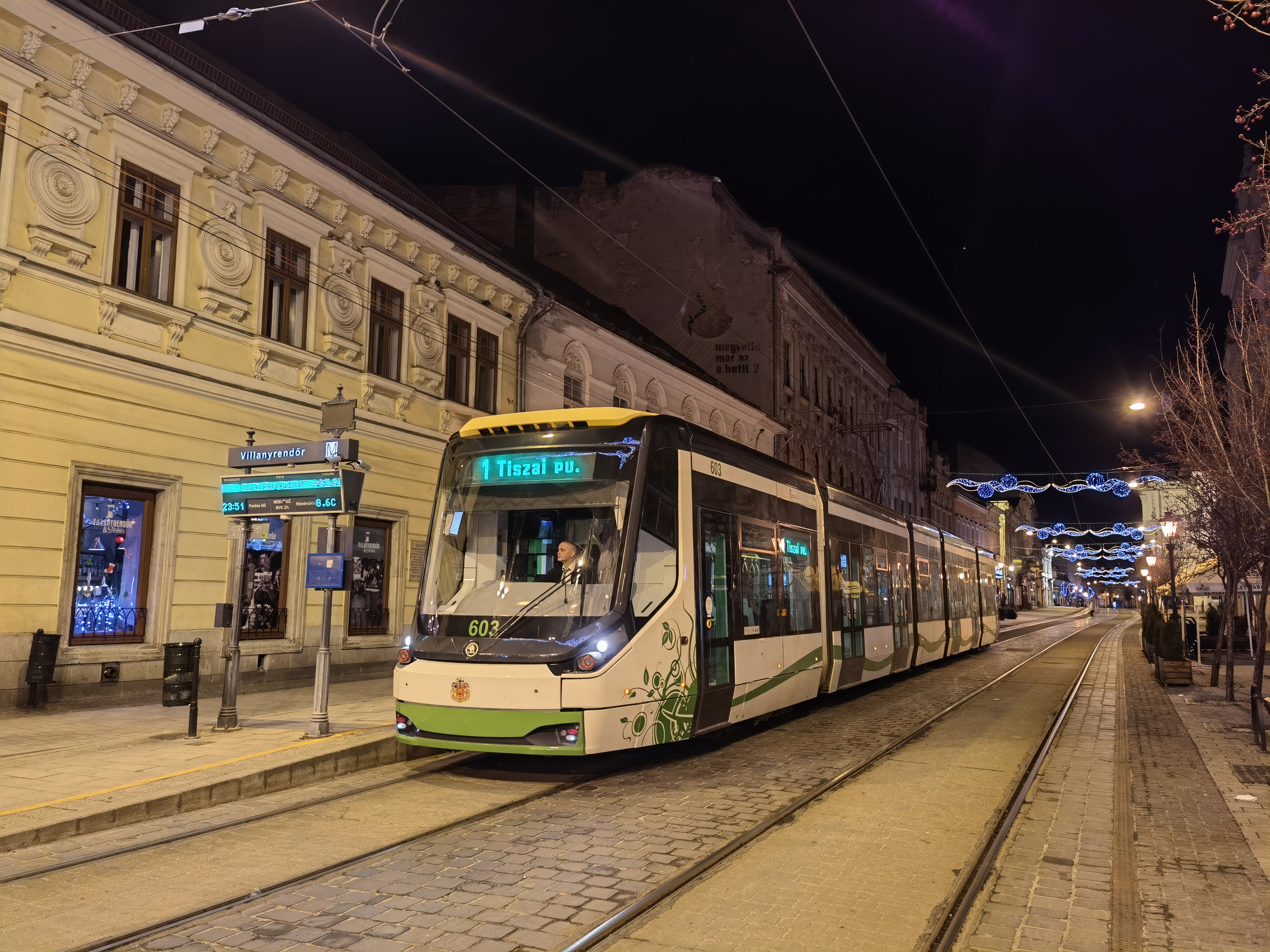
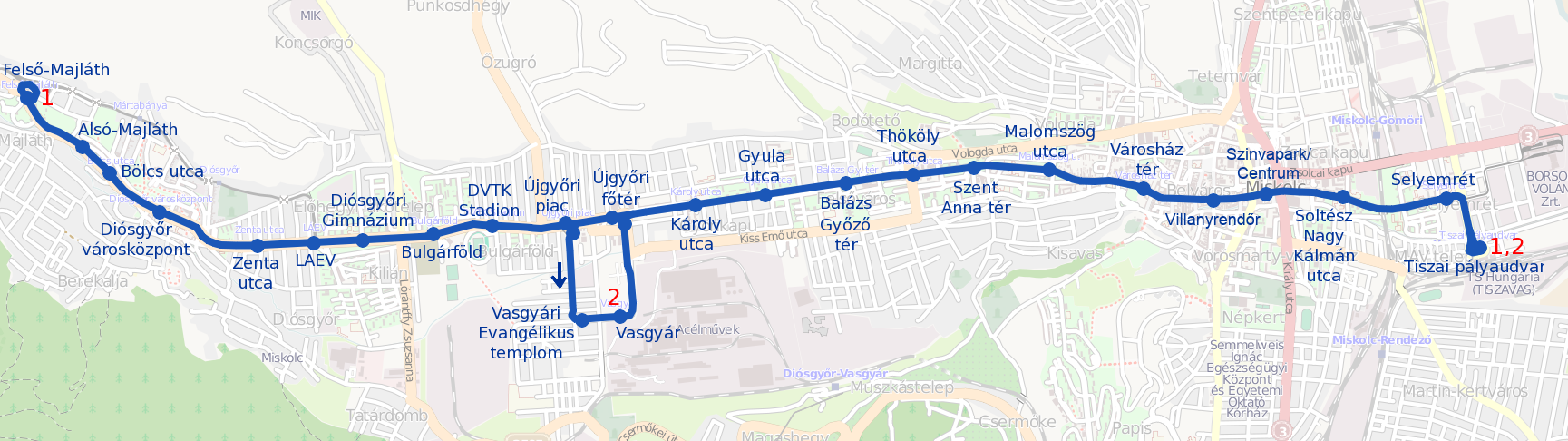
- Škoda 26T on villanyrendőr

Operation
- Locale: Miskolc, Hungary
- Open: 10 July 1897
- Status: Open
- Routes: 2
- Operators: MVV Rt. (1897–1954) and MDV Rt. (1905–1906); MKV / MVK Rt. / MVK Zrt. (1954–)

Infrastructure
- Track gauge: 1,435 mm (4 ft 8 1/2 in) standard gauge
- Propulsion system: Electricity
- Electrification: 600 V DC overhead
- Depot: 1 (Szondi György utca)
- Stock: 31 Škoda 26T

Statistics
- Track length (total): 18 km (11 mi)
- Route length: 12 km (7.5 mi)
- Website: https://www.mvkzrt.hu Miskolc Városi Közlekedési Zrt. (in Hungarian)

Trams in Miskolc is an important part of the public transport network serving Miskolc, Hungary. In operation since 1897, the network presently has one full tramline and two tramlines that run only on weekends.

== History ==
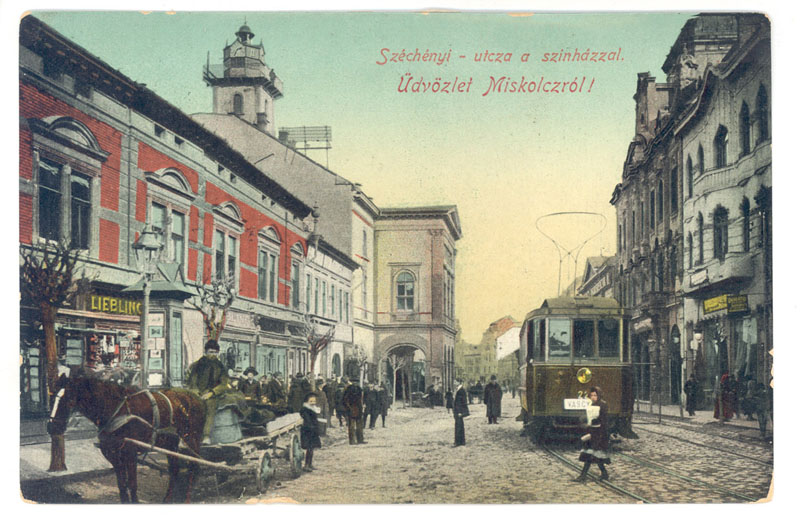
Széchenyi street, between 1897 and 1910. At left: National Theatre of Miskolc.

The need for public transport in Miskolc arose in the second half of the 19th century. The newly built railway line and its station were, at that time, far from the city proper, and even further from the ironworks of the neighbouring town Diósgyőr. The plans for the first tram line were finished in 1895.

The first tram line opened on July 10, 1897 and had eight stops (including the termini) between Tiszai railway station and St. Anne's Church. This route still forms part of both of the current lines. Miskolc was the fourth Hungarian city to have a tram line built, after Budapest (1887), Pozsony (now Bratislava) (1895) and Szombathely (earlier in 1897); it was the second city to have a standard gauge tramway as the ones in Pozsony and Szombathely were narrow gauge.

Due to the success of the east-west line, a north-south line was built before the end of 1897 between Búza tér (the main market of the city) and People's Garden (a popular leisure park). This was extended to the neighbouring village of Hejőcsaba in 1910.

It was only in the early 20th century that the east-west line was extended to reach Diósgyőr. Traffic on the line between St. Anne's Church and Diósgyőr started in 1904. Permission was granted for it to operate not as a city railway but as a suburban railway as it went beyond the administrative border of Miskolc. It was also operated by a different company, the Miskolc-Diósgyőr Municipal Railway Company (MDV Rt.) while the Tiszai station–St. Anne's Church line was operated by the Electric Company of Miskolc (MVV Rt.) This arrangement required passengers to change cars at the church; the resulting inconvenience was solved in 1906 when the two lines were united and management of the Diósgyőr line was taken over by MVV.

Until 1947, the tram operator also ensured the supply of electricity to Miskolc.

After World War II, the city boundaries were shifted further out from the centre; Miskolc became the second largest city in the People's Republic of Hungary. Heavy industry became important, and public housing was built, adding patronage to the tram and bus lines, the main task of which was delivering workers to factories.

In 1954, MVV was merged with the company responsible for the bus service, under the name Mass Transport Company of Miskolc (MKV). The north-south line was lifted in 1960, as it could not handle the traffic as effectively as bus routes after new residential areas had been developed. In 1964, the Tiszai station–Diósgyőr line was reconstructed as a double-track line (until then it was single-track).

== Network evolution ==
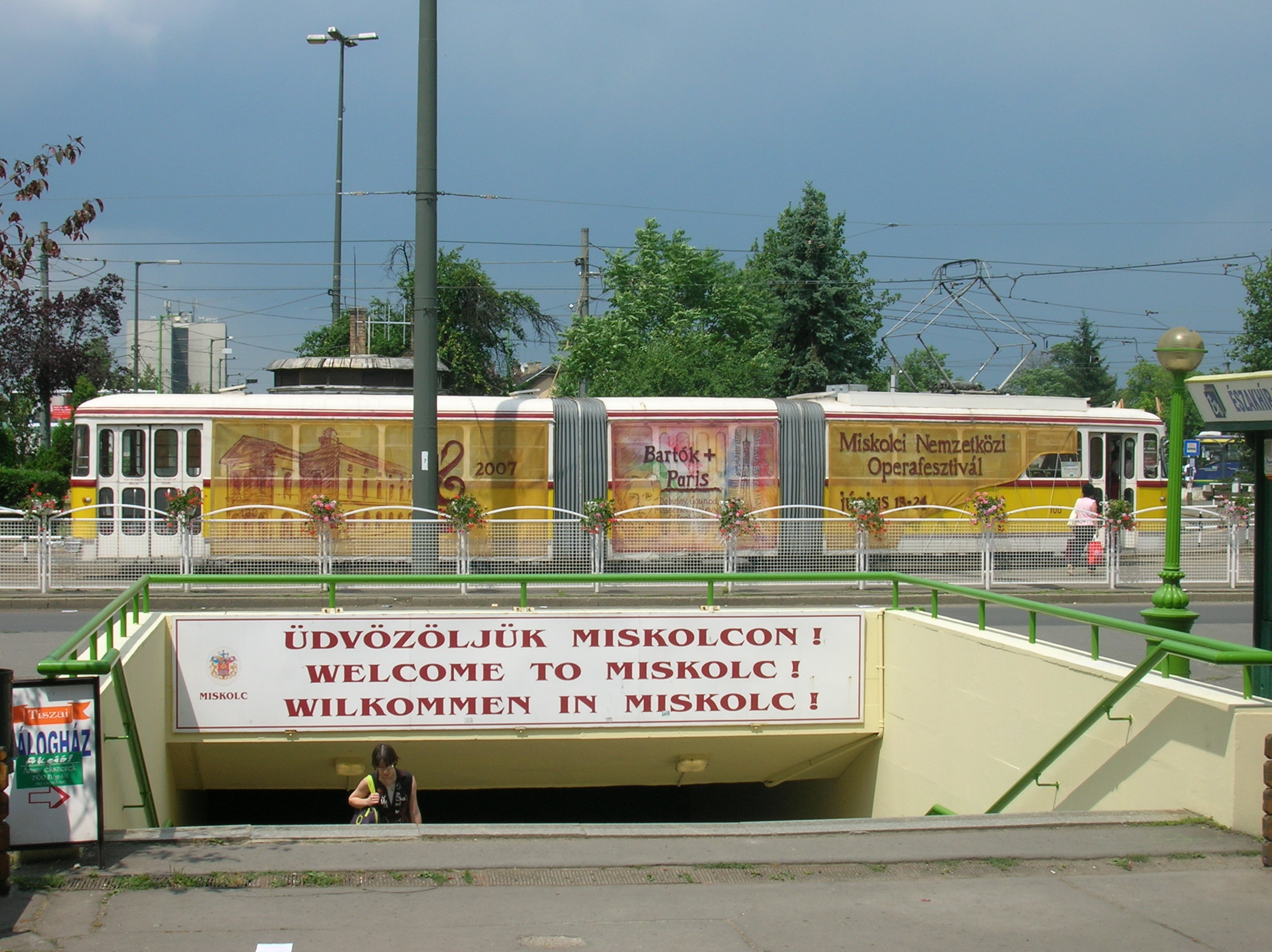
A tram outside Tiszai station during the Opera Festival.

During its history the network has had these lines:

- Line 1 (Tiszai station–Felső-Majláth) 1897–
  - Started service between Tiszai station and St. Anna square in 1897
  - Merged with Diósgyőr Municipal Railway in 1906
  - Was called "primary line" until 1951 when it was renamed Line 1
  - Extended to Felső-Majláth in 2012
- Diósgyőr Municipal Railway (St. Anna square – Diósgyőr) 1905–1906
  - Started service between St. Anna square and Diósgyőr in 1905
  - Merged with the primary tram line in 1906
- Line 1A (Tiszai station – Esperanto square) 1958
  - Short-lived tram line between Tiszai station and St. Anna square (called Esperanto square then) in 1958
- Line 2 (Szemere street – Hejőcsaba) 1897–1960
  - Started service between Búza square and People's Garden in 1897
  - Temporarily halted between 1908–1910, cars were redirected to the primary line where there was a shortage of them
  - Extended between People's Garden and Hejőcsaba in 1910; Búza square terminus moved to Szemere street
  - Was called "secondary line" until 1951 when it was renamed Line 2
  - Closed in 1960
- Line 2 (Tiszai station – Vasgyár/Ironworks) 1964–
- Line 3 (Diósgyőr – Vasgyár) 1951–1991
- Line 4 (Bulgárföld – Tatárdomb) 1964–1976
- Line 0 (Újgyőri főtér – Vasgyár) 1970–1989; 2012
  - Ran between Marx square (today Újgyőri main square) and Vasgyár between 1970–1989
  - Started again in February 2012 but closed in April that year

== Current lines ==
| Line | Start | End | Length | Stops | Hours of service Weekdays | Rolling stock |
| 1V | Tiszai pályaudvar | Felső-Majláth | 11.5 km | 22 | 3:40 - 23:30 | Škoda 26T |
| 1AV | Tiszai pályaudvar | Diósgyőri Gimnázium | 8.6 km | 17 | 5:00 - 18:15 | Škoda 26T |
| 2V | Tiszai pályaudvar | Újgyőri főtér | | 15 | 5:00 - 17:00 | Škoda 26T |

== Fleet ==
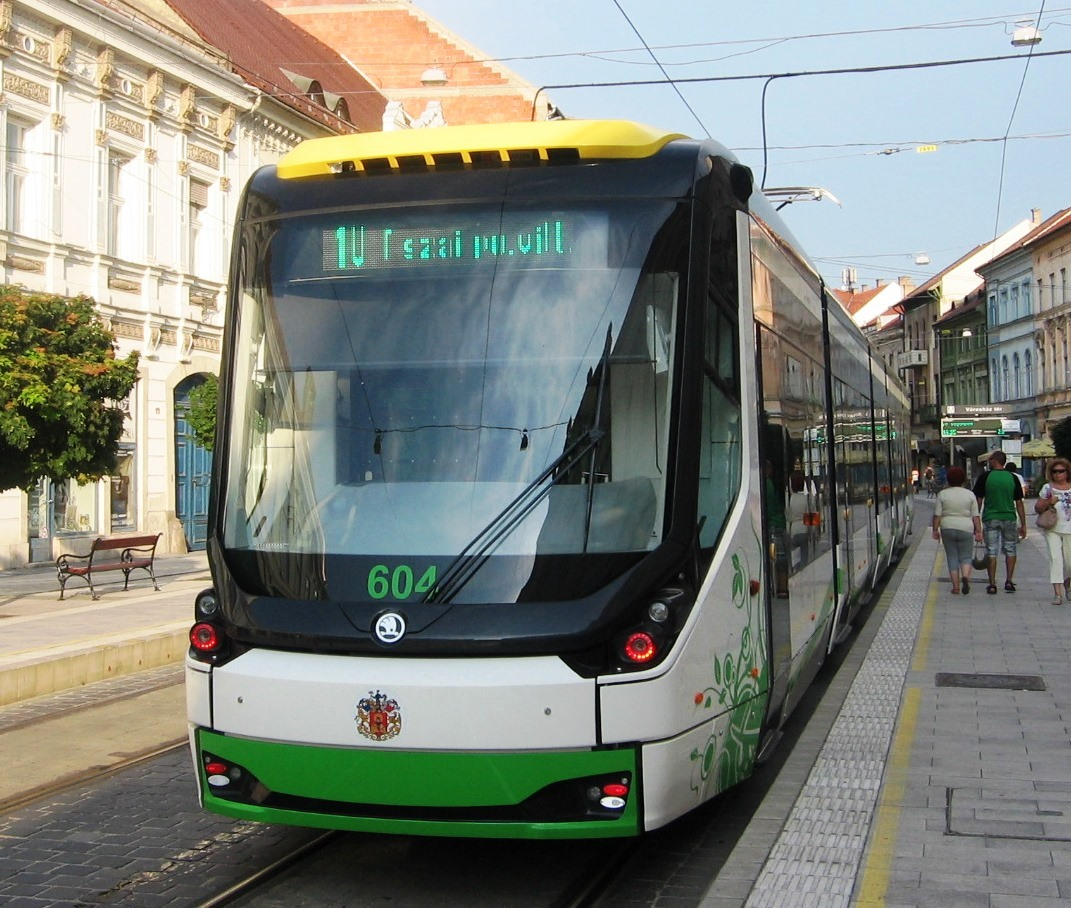
Škoda 26 T tramway in Miskolc

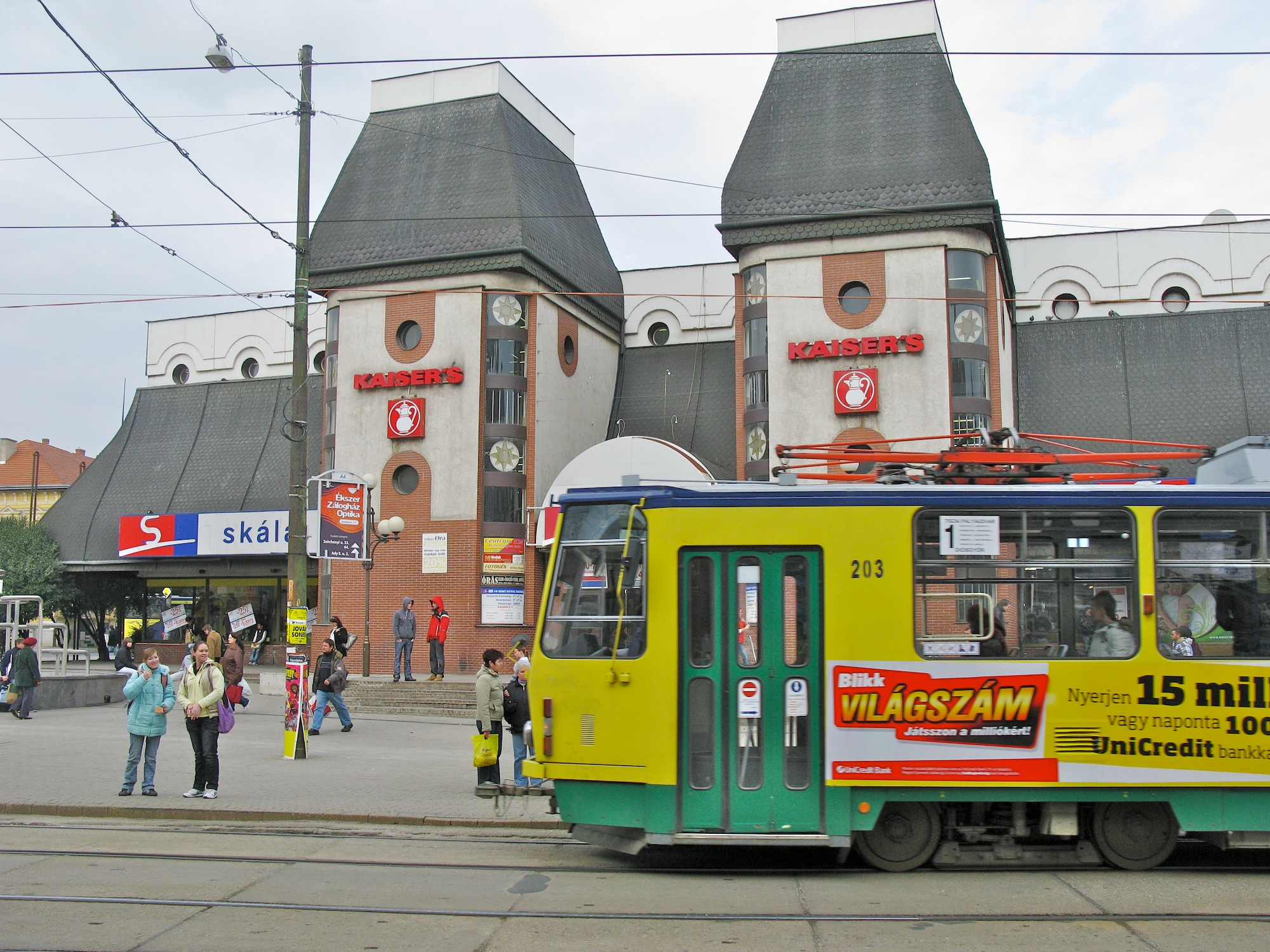
A Tatra KT8D5 in Miskolc

=== Current fleet ===
- 31 Škoda 26 T, low-floor tram
- 1 M5 snowplough.

=== Heritage fleet ===
- 1 FVV 1100 vintage tram No. 100, not in regular service (can be frequently seen during the Opera Festival);
- 1 FVV 1200 vintage tram No. 151, not in regular service.
- 1 SGP E_{1} + Lohner C3 vintage tram + passenger trailer No. 199 + 300
- 3 ČKD Tatra KT8D5 (from 18 purchased secondhand from Most and Košice in the 1990s);

=== Past fleet ===
- 11 FVV 1100 uni-directional tram, with 3 doors, 1962-1989
- 10 FVV 1100 bi-directional tram, with 5 doors, 1967-1991
- 35 FVV 1200 bi-directional tram, with 10 doors, 1970-2004
- 6 Lohner C3 passenger trailers, 2003-2013
- 19 SGP E_{1}, uni-directional tram, 2003-2014
- 18 ČKD Tatra KT8D5 bi-directional tram, with 10 doors, 1990-

== See also ==
- List of town tramway systems in Hungary
- List of town tramway systems in Europe
