= Miskolc Gömöri railway station =

Railway station in Miskolc, Hungary

Coordinates: 48°06′N 20°47′E

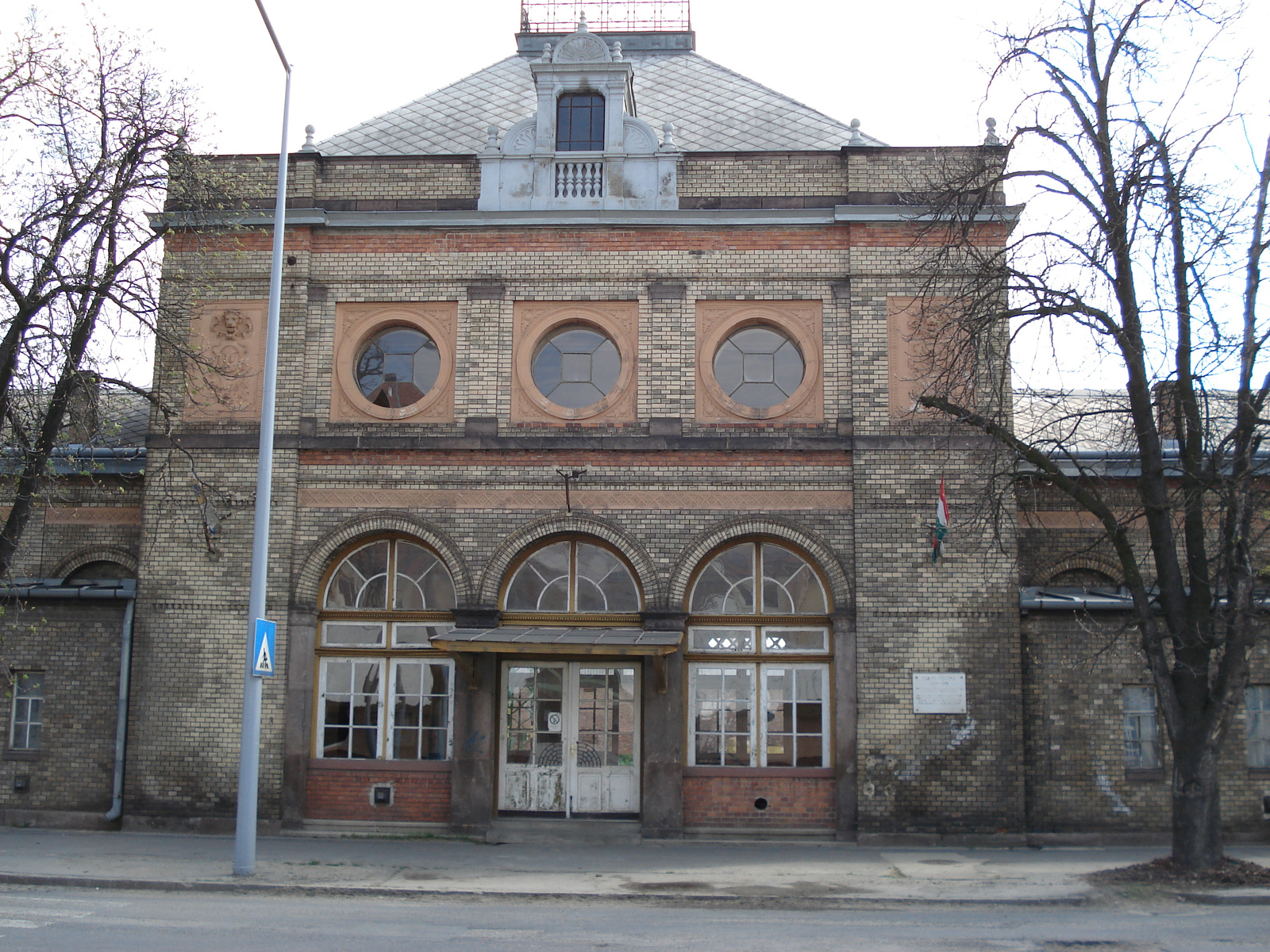
The station

Miskolc–Gömöri railway station, operated by Hungarian State Railways, is the smaller of two railway stations of the city of Miskolc, Hungary.

The railway station was built in the late 19th century and got its name after the historical Gömör county. It was mainly important because it connected the mines and metal factories of Gömör to the city. The railway lines between Miskolc and the towns of Bánréve and Fülek (today: Fiľakovo) were constructed in the 1870s.

The building was designed by Ferenc Pfaff and the construction was finished in 1898. Pfaff also designed the railway stations of Pozsony (today: Bratislava) and Kaposvár.

The building became subject of a preservation order in 1989 because it was in poor condition.

The Tiszai station is undoubtedly the more significant of the two and many people are not even aware of the existence of Gömöri Station.
