= Miskolc Opera Festival =

Opera festival in Hungary (2001–2019)

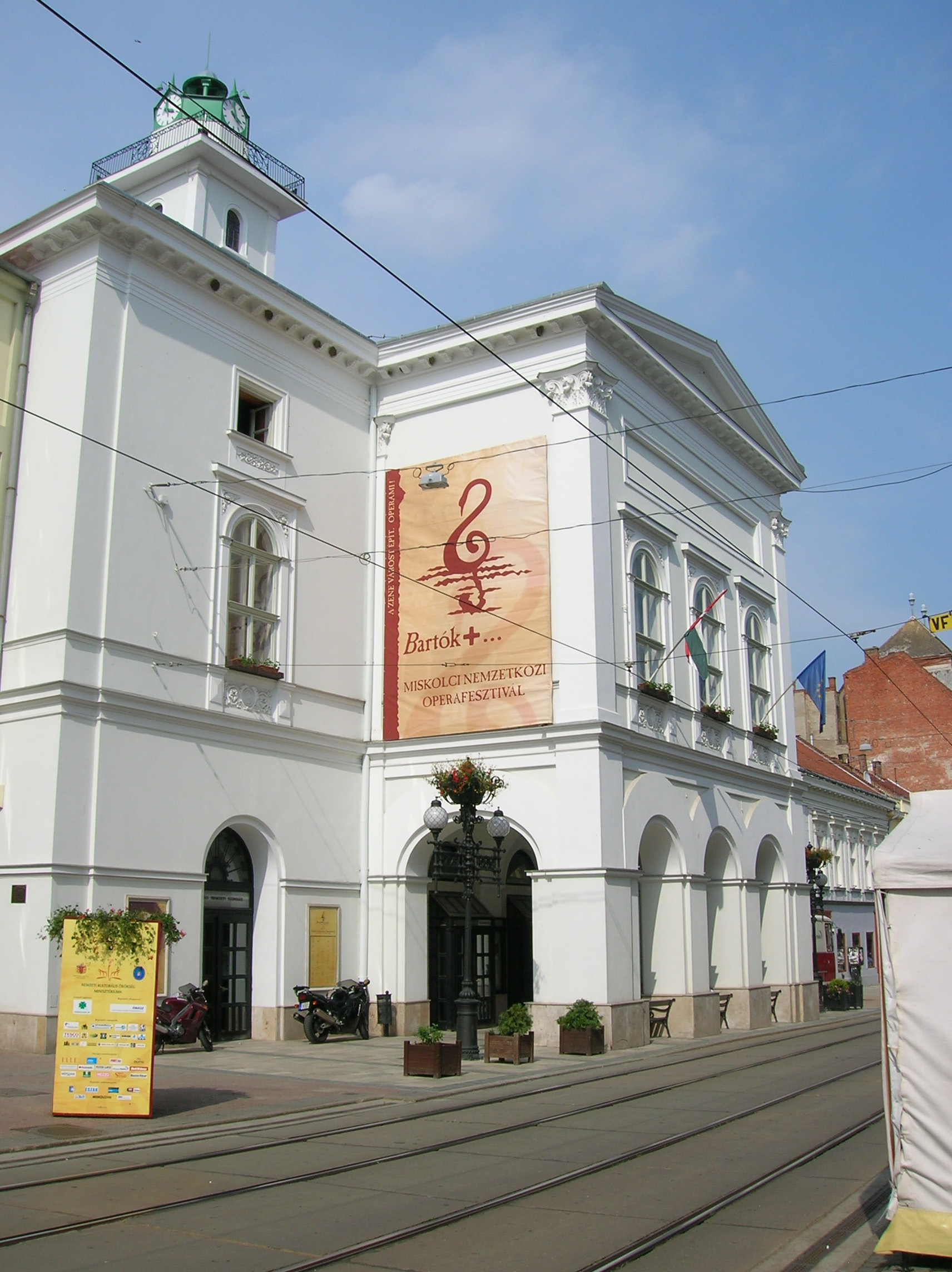
Miskolc Theatre

The Miskolc Opera Festival or International Opera Festival of Miskolc (Miskolci Nemzetközi Operafesztivál) was a cultural event held every summer in Miskolc, the capital of Borsod–Abaúj–Zemplén County county, Hungary. The event offers a selection of opera performances with the participations of famous artists from all over the world and was created by Péter Müller Sziámi, the former art director of the National Theatre of Miskolc in 2001.

The main venue was the National Theatre of Miskolc, the current building dating from 1847. The main auditorium (capacity 687), the summer theatre (500) and chamber theatre (270) are used for stage works. Concerts also took place in the Ice Hall (winter sports hall), the House of the Arts and churches such as the Protestant Church, Kossuth u, as well as in public squares.

It was also called "Bartók + ... Opera Festival", because each year the festival focused on the works of Bartók plus another composer or composers. There were chamber recitals alongside the operatic performances as well as events for children and films.

Some productions are from visiting companies; in 2009 Moscow Helikon Opera, National Theatre of Szeged and Latvian National Opera were among these.

In 2017, the festival marked the half millennium of the reformation with productions of Scaevola (world premiere) by Mátyássy Szabolcs, an opera-musical The Master and Margarita by Levente Gyöngyösi, María de Buenos Aires by Piazzolla, Candide by Bernstein, Jr. Butterfly by Shigeaki Saegusa, as well as Bluebeard's Castle and The Spinning Room.

During festival time MVK Rt. operates a veteran tram which stops outside the theatre, where regular trams do not stop, and is free for festival patrons with tickets.

The last edition of the festival took place in 2019.

Since 2001, festivals have had as their theme:

- 2001: Bartók + Verdi;
- 2002: Bartók + Puccini;
- 2003: Bartók + Mozart;
- 2004: Bartók + Tchaikovsky;
- 2005: Bartók + Bel canto (Rossini, Bellini and Donizetti);
- 2006: Bartók + Verismo;
- 2007: Bartók + Paris;
- 2008: Bartók + Slav composers;
- 2009: Bartók + Vienna; covered Gluck (Le cadi dupé), Haydn (La canterina, L'infedeltà delusa), Mozart (Apollo et Hyacinthus, L'oca del Cairo, The Marriage of Figaro, The Magic Flute), Strauss (Ariadne auf Naxos), Berg (Wozzeck, Lulu), Schoenberg (Moses und Aron);
- 2010: Bartók + Europe;
- 2011: Bartók + Verdi;
- 2012: Bartók + Puccini; themes are rotated from now on

== Classical rock shows ==
In 2007, the festival contained a concert of the Swedish symphonic metal band Therion with a complete symphonic orchestra and choir, the second such performance of them ever. The show included a full orchestral version of their song "Clavicula Nox", and music by Antonín Dvořák, Giuseppe Verdi, Wolfgang Amadeus Mozart, Camille Saint-Saëns and Richard Wagner. The second part of the show featured the band's assorted songs, in which classical instruments and choir have a significant role.

After the great success of this concert, the tradition of rock-classical events was established under the name "Opera-Rock-Show". For the 2008 festival, the Dutch band Epica was invited to play. As Therion a year before, they also played their own songs in addition to classical pieces by many classical composers including Vivaldi, Dvořák, Verdi, Grieg, plus soundtracks of the movies Star Wars, Spider-Man and Pirates of the Caribbean.

The 2010 festival featured two concerts: one of by the Hungarian rock band Republic and the other by Tarja Turunen, who was originally scheduled for 2009, but due to organisation problems it was postponed. The shows have been seemingly discontinued in the following years, there were neither plans, no rumours about more acts.

Both Therion's and Epica's performances were released as a live album in 2009 by Nuclear Blast Records. While Epica issued only a double CD with the name The Classical Conspiracy, Therion also had DVD recordings called The Miskolc Experience.
