= Szirma =

Coordinates: 48°04′15″N 20°49′42″E

Szirma Miskolc-Szirma
- Former municipality
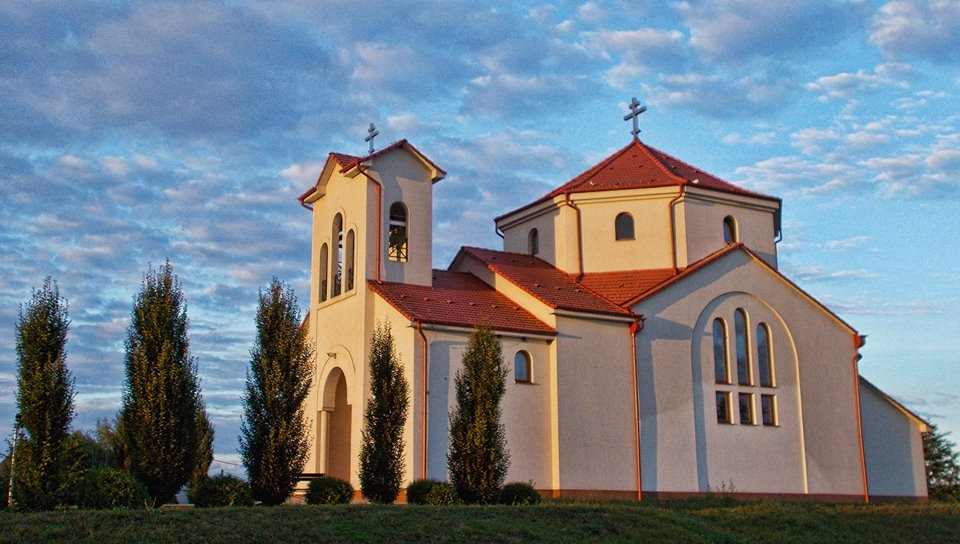
- Greek Catholic church of Szirma

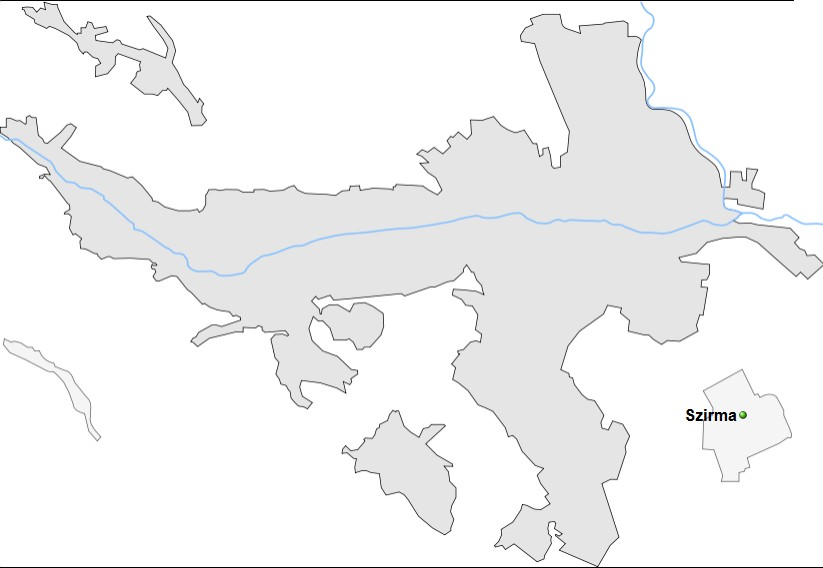
- Szirma within Miskolc

- Location within Hungary
- Country: Hungary
- Regions: Northern Hungary
- County: Borsod-Abaúj-Zemplén County
- District: Miskolc District

Population (2022)
  - Total: 4,163
- Time zone: UTC+1 (CET)
  - Summer (DST): UTC+2 (CEST)
- Postal code: 3521
- Area code: (+36) 46

Szirma was a village in Borsod-Abaúj-Zemplén County, northern Hungary. It has been part of Miskolc since 1950. Nowadays it is a peaceful and a family-friendly neighbourhood with easy access to city centre.

== Geography ==
Szirma is located at the southeast corner of Miskolc and lies on a low area between river Hejő and Sajó, near the edge of the Great Plain. It is 3 km (1.8m) away from the centre, which can be easily reached by local public transport, by bus 3. Szirma is also close to the M30 Motorway and the Park Center shopping centre.

== History ==
Szirma was established during the Árpád Era and it was first mentioned in a source from 1343. In fact, the source was rather related to a person, Márk Szirmai, who lived in the settlement with his family. In 1417 the village was donated to the Szirmay family by King Sigismund. Later in the 16th and 17th century the territory was under the rule of the Ottoman Empire.

As a result of great floods, in 1674 the villagers had to leave the settlement. In the 18th century the population was still very small, there were only 72 houses in 1736. It was not until the 19th century, however, that the population began to grow.

Earlier the village also had an important role in agriculture, supplying Miskolc with vegetables. Due to the area's geographical features, the garden suburb has excellent flat lands for cultivation. In 1950 Szirma was annexed to the city of Miskolc.

== Manor house ==
Around 1902-1903, an ornate manor house, the so-called Klein Castle (Klein-kastély), was constructed by two famous architects, Béla Lajta and Ödön Lechner. It was built in Art Nouveau style, and belonged to the landowner, Mór Klein and his son Sándor Klein. The lexicons which were published during interwar period mention the manor house was also home to a significant artwork collection. Unfortunately, the building was destroyed during the Second World War in 1944.

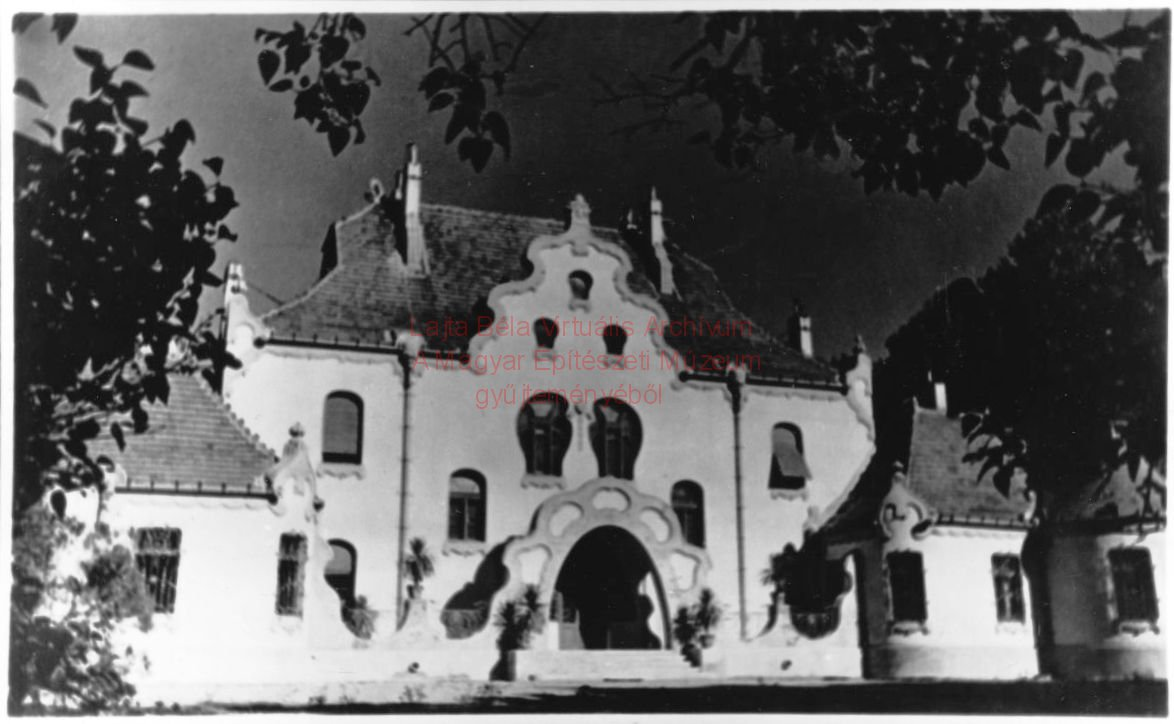
The Manor House - The street front in the 1930s

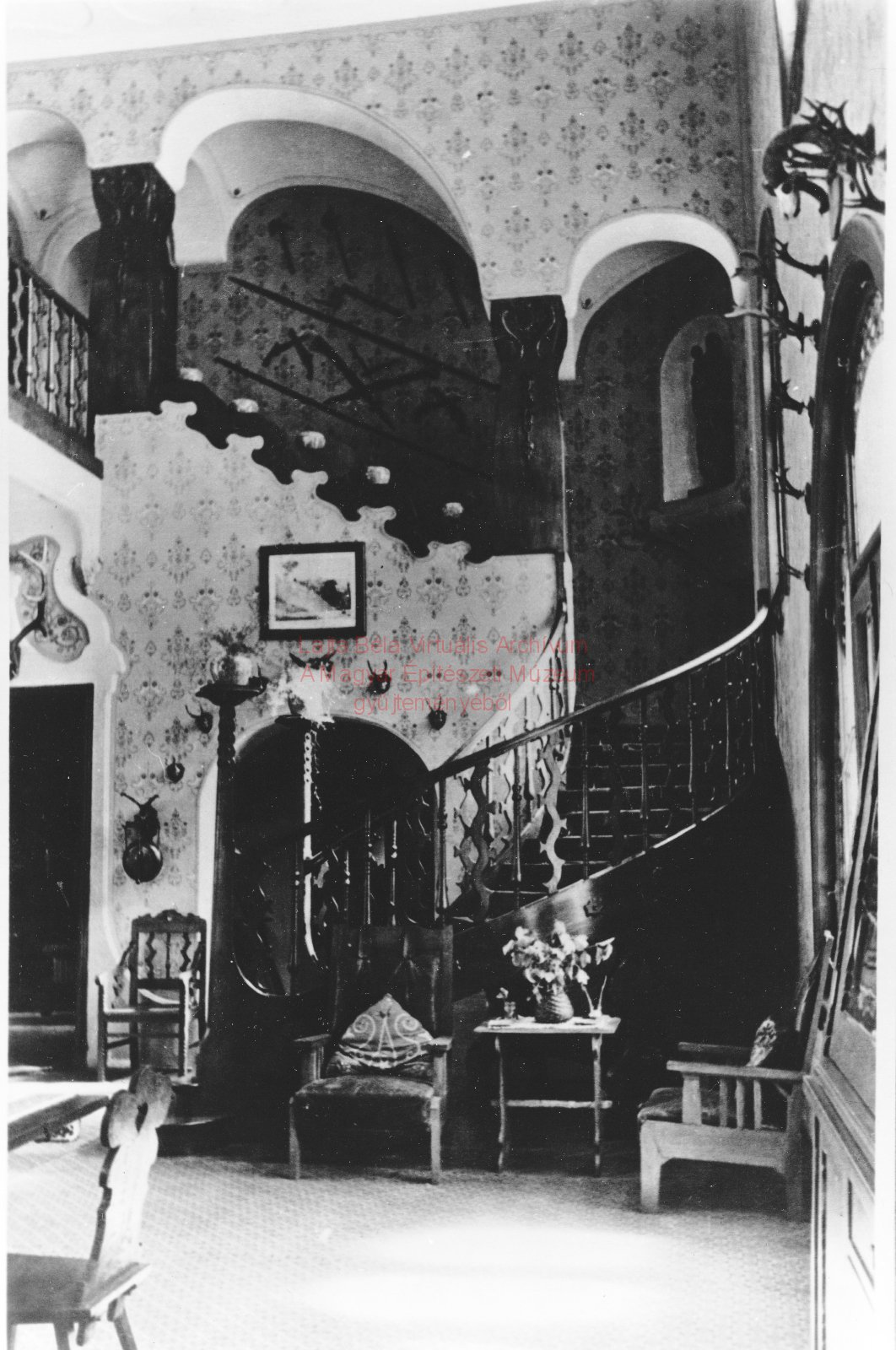
The staircase in the entrance hall, 1930s

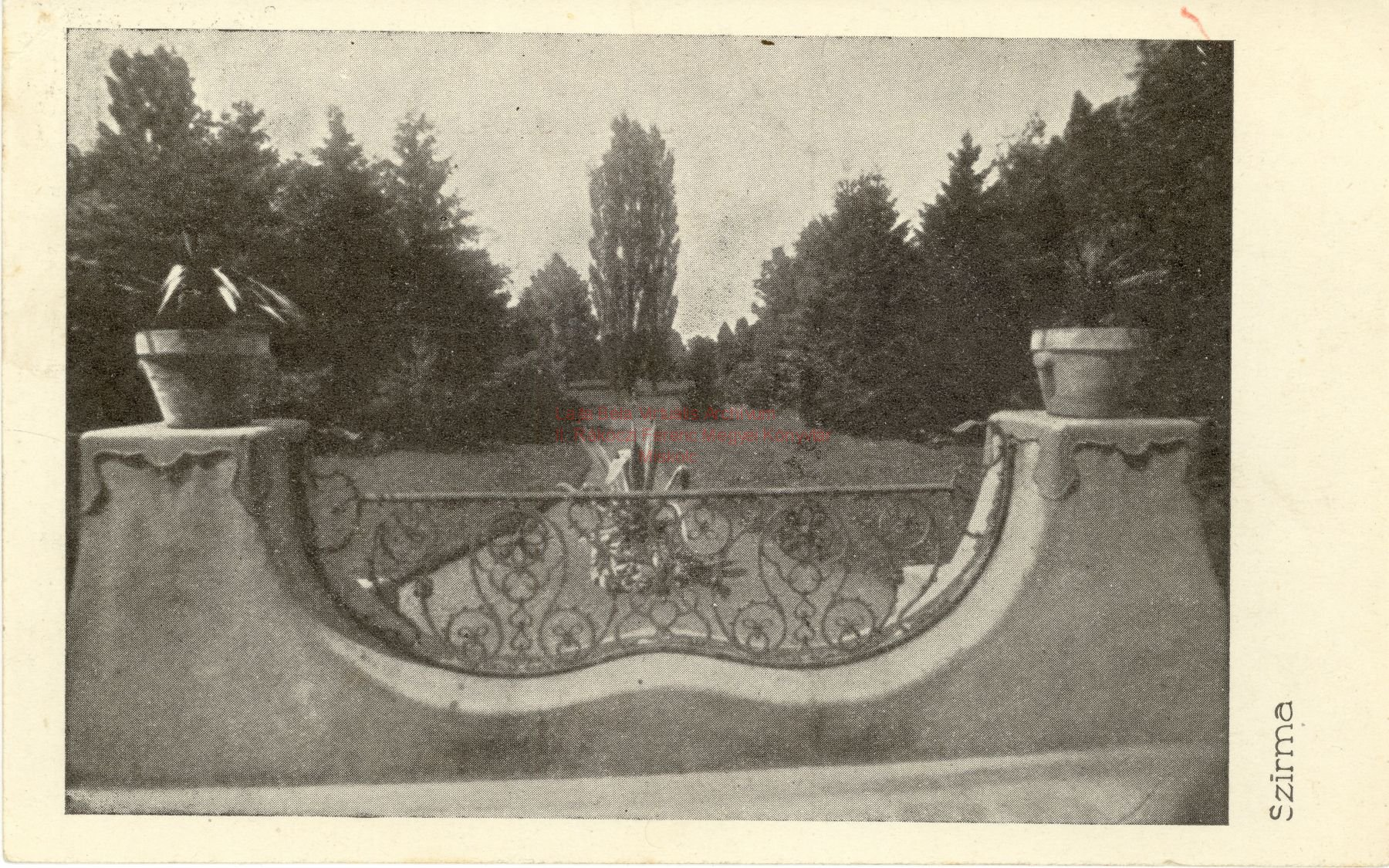
View from the garden terrace of the manor house, picture postcard, before 1913

== Religious sites ==
Szirma has four churches; a Roman Catholic, a Greek Catholic, a Reformed, and a Baptist.

== Education ==
Szirma has a kindergarten and a primary school, the Reformed Primary School of Miskolc-Szirma (formerly Bem József Primary School). The institution was built in the mid 1900s and has been recently renovated and renamed.

== Gallery ==
Town sign of Szirma

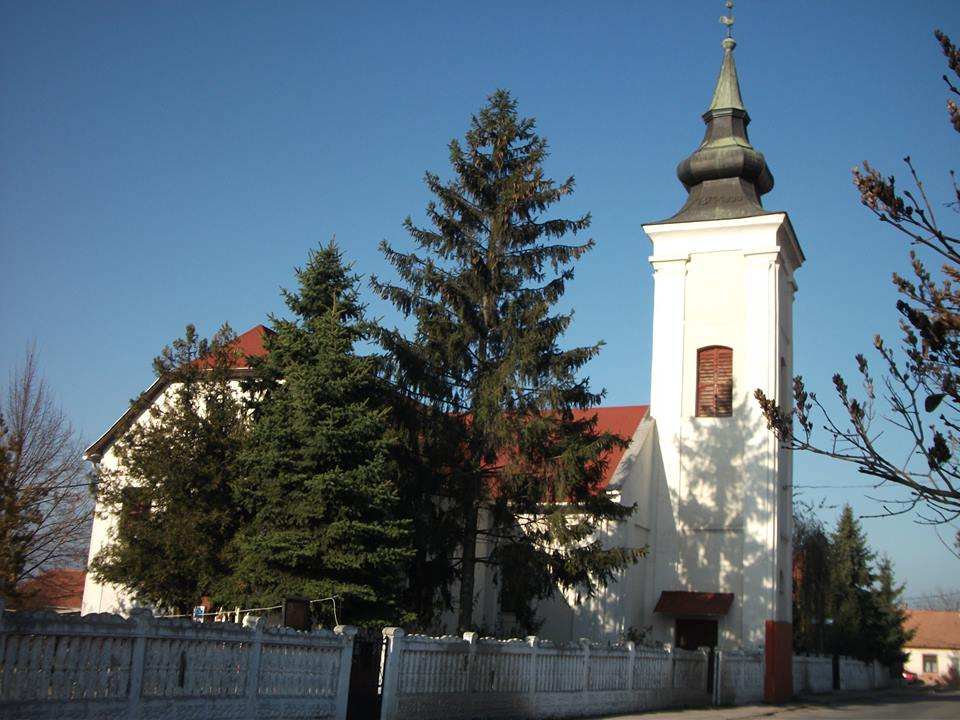
Reformed church

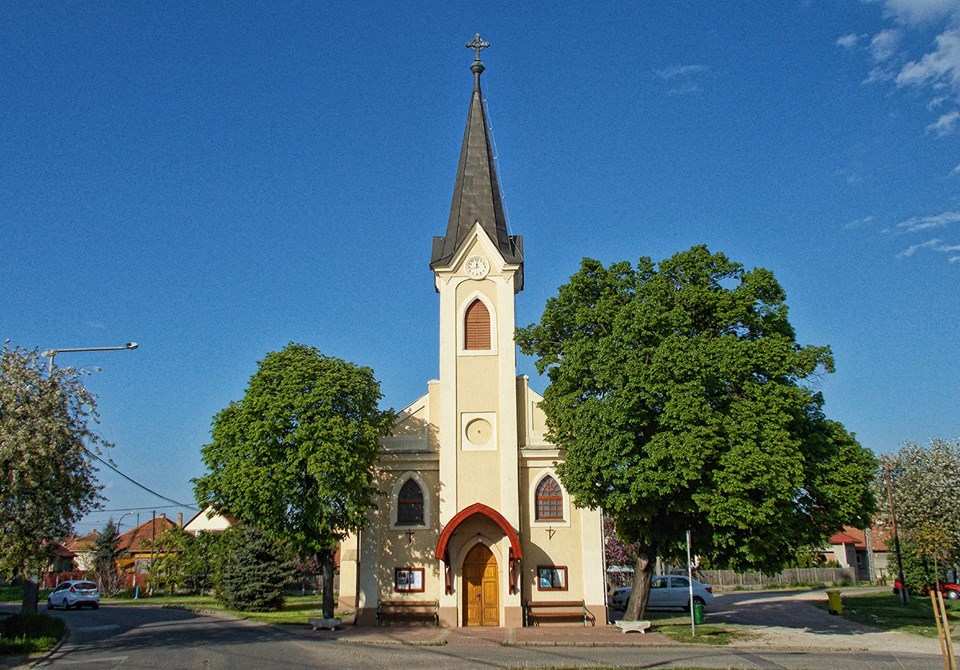
Roman Catholic church

Baptist prayer house

Bus 3738 in Szirma

== See also ==
- Miskolc
