= Martinkertváros =

Martinkertváros Martinské Predmestie (Slovak) Martintelep
- Neighbourhood
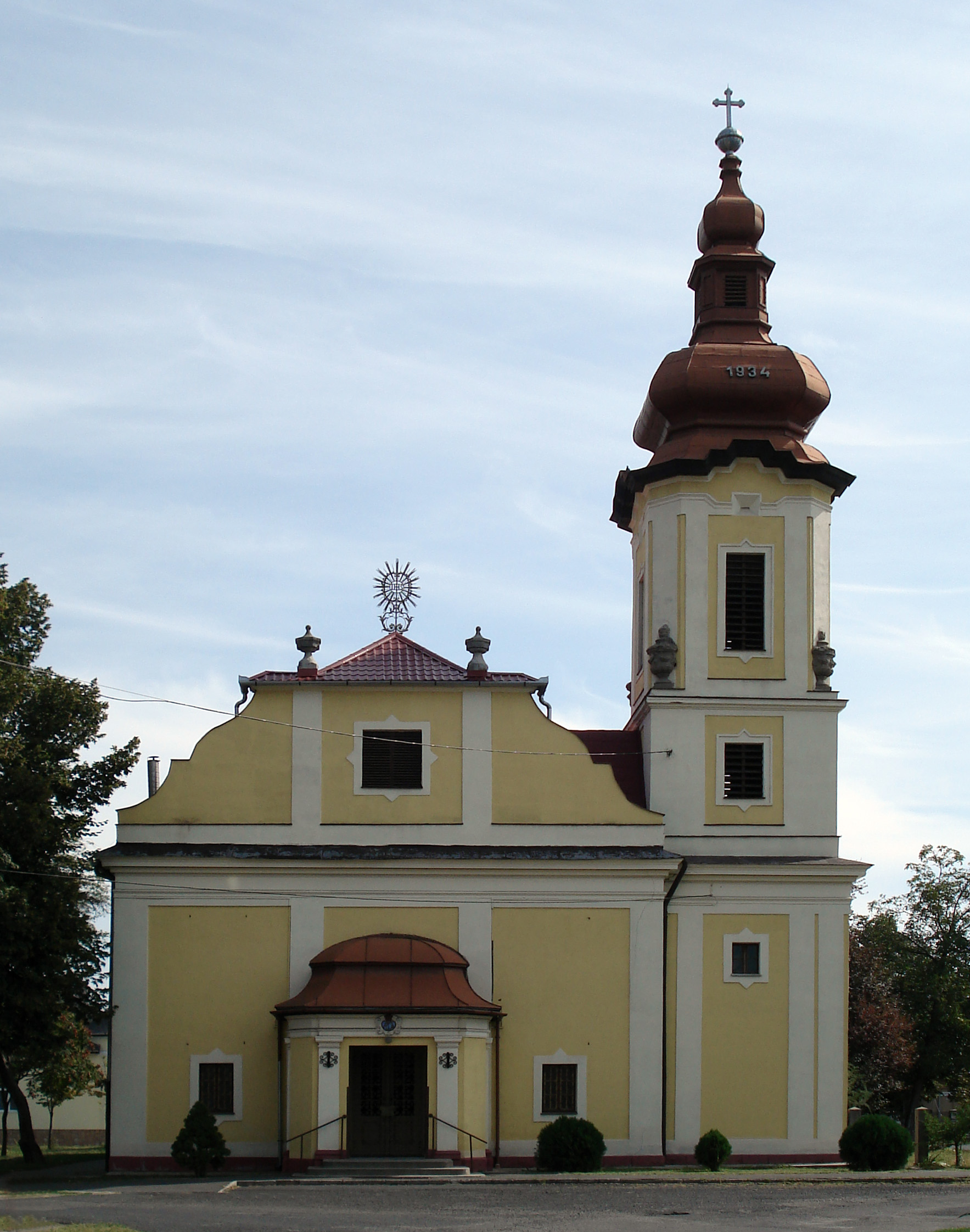
- Catholic church

- Location within Hungary
- Country: Hungary
- Regions: Northern Hungary
- County: Borsod-Abaúj-Zemplén County
- District: Sátoraljaújhely District
- Time zone: UTC+1 (CET)
  - Summer (DST): UTC+2 (CEST)
- Area code: (+36) 46

Martinkertváros (Slovak: Martinské Predmestie), formerly Martintelep is a neighbourhood of the city of Miskolc in Borsod-Abaúj-Zemplén County, Hungary. Unlike many other districts that are on the outskirts on the city, Martinkertváros has never been an independent municipality.

== Geography ==
Martinkertváros is located in the southeastern part of Miskolc, about 3 kilometres from the city centre.

== History ==
The area was first mentioned in 1908 as the estate of Károly Martin near the classification yard. Károly Martin was the founder and first commander of the fire brigade in Miskolc; today not only the garden town, but also a street bears his name.

The neighbourhood belonged to Hejőcsaba until 1935, when it was annexed to Miskolc. Later in 1945, Hejőcsaba, along with Diósgyőr, was also annexed to Miskolc.

On June 2, 1944 the US Airforce bombed the railway station and classification yard of Miskolc. Because of its proximity to the bombed areas Martintelep suffered some damages. The attack claimed 206 lives in the city and 420 people were wounded.

Martinkertváros is one of the quietest areas of the city. It can be reached from the city centre by bus routes 3 and 3A.

== Name ==
Some residents of the area disliked the name Martintelep (mostly because the -telep part, meaning "settlement" is often part of the name of Romani settlements.) The district was officially renamed to Martinkertváros (kertváros means "garden town") on September 5, 2002, however, in colloquial speech it is still called Martintelep by everyone but its residents.

== Gallery ==
Reformed church

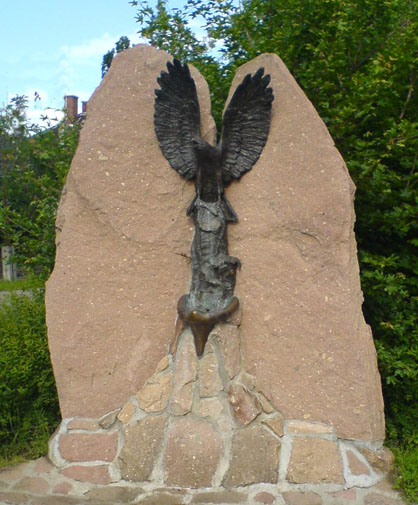
Memorial

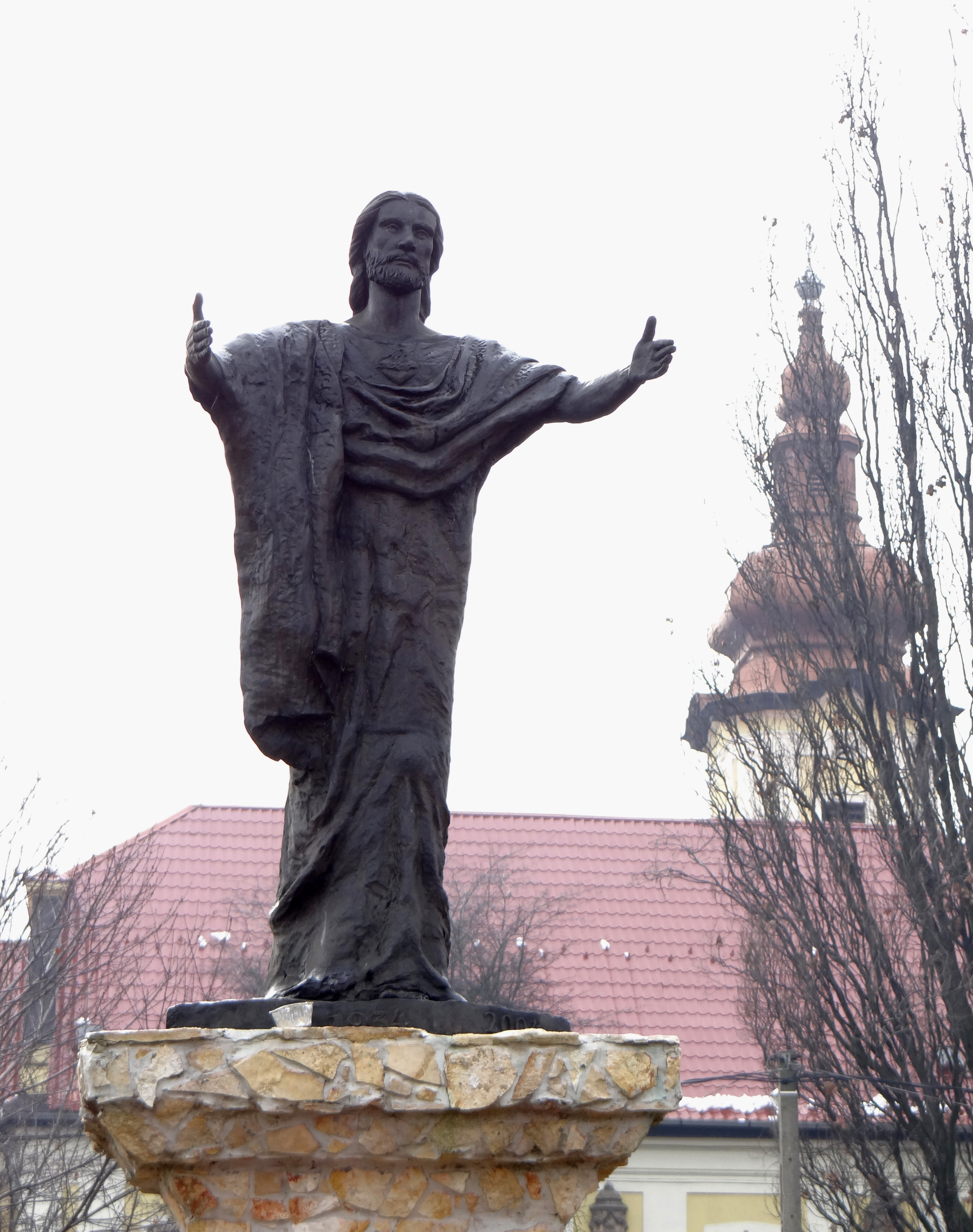
Christ statue
