= Komlóstető =

Komlóstető Miskolc-Komlóstető
- Neighbourhood
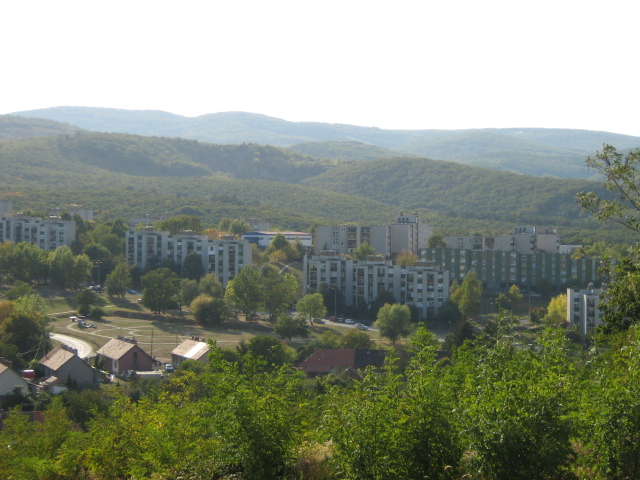
- View of Komlóstető

- Location within Hungary
- Country: Hungary
- Regions: Northern Hungary
- County: Borsod-Abaúj-Zemplén County
- District: Miskolc District

Area
  - Total: 8.59 km^{2} (3.32 sq mi)
- Time zone: UTC+1 (CET)
  - Summer (DST): UTC+2 (CEST)
- Postal code: 3533
- Area code: +36 (46)

Komlóstető is a neighbourhood of the city of Miskolc, in Borsod-Abaúj-Zemplén County, Hungary.

== Geography ==
Komlóstető lies south of Diósgyőr, covering the foothills of the Bükk Mountains all the way to the ridge, extending to the northern edge of Miskolctapolca.

== History ==
The Komlóstető housing estate was built between 1975 and 1989 in the southwestern part of Miskolc. At that time, alleviating the housing shortage became a priority, so housing complexes of higher quality and better integration into the cityscape were built. The first residents of the nearly 750 apartments were typically families of high social status.

== Demographics ==
According to the 2001 census, the population of Komlóstető-Vargahegy was 4,680, 2.5% of the population of the city of Miskolc.

== Gallery ==
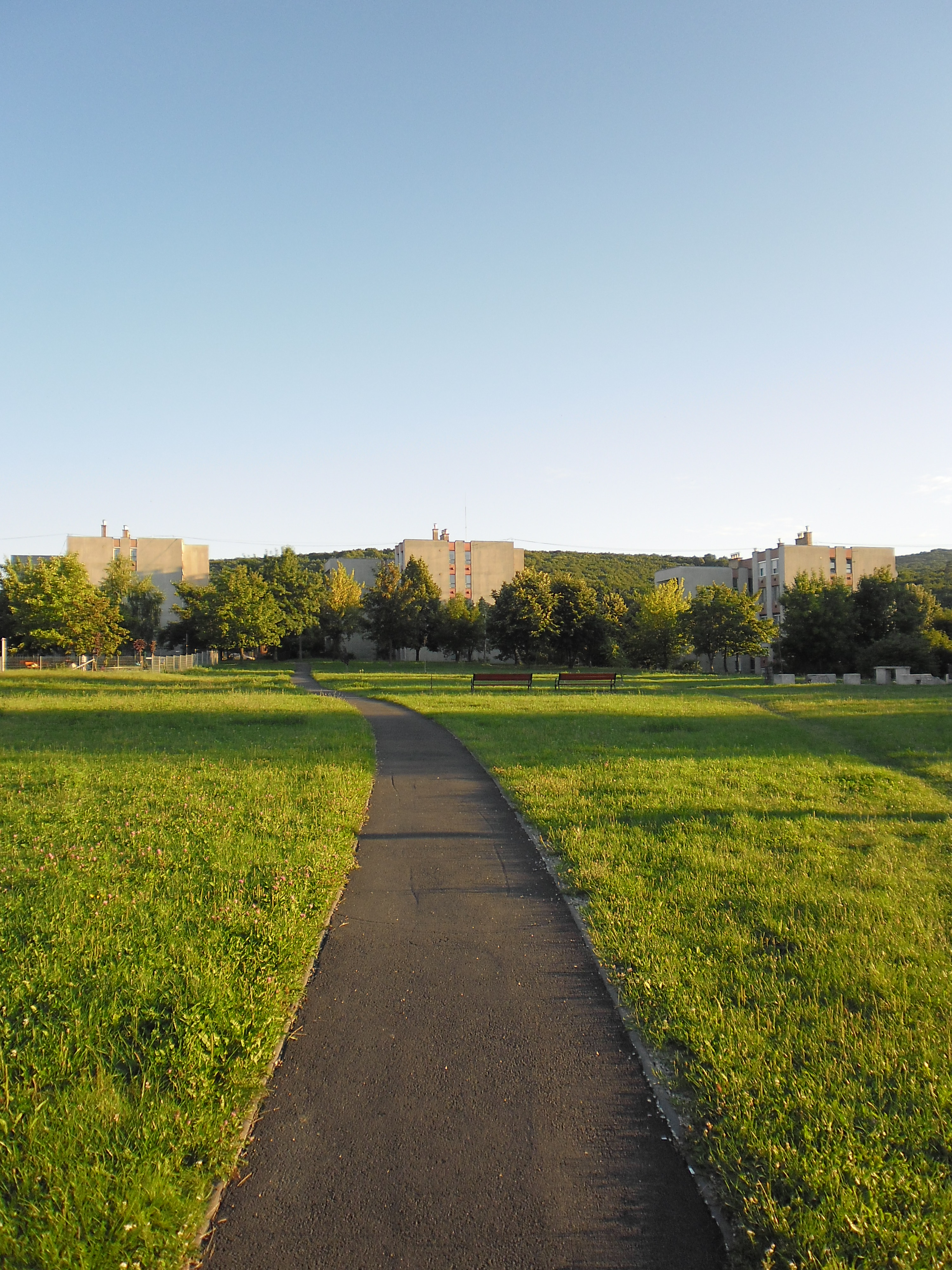
Park

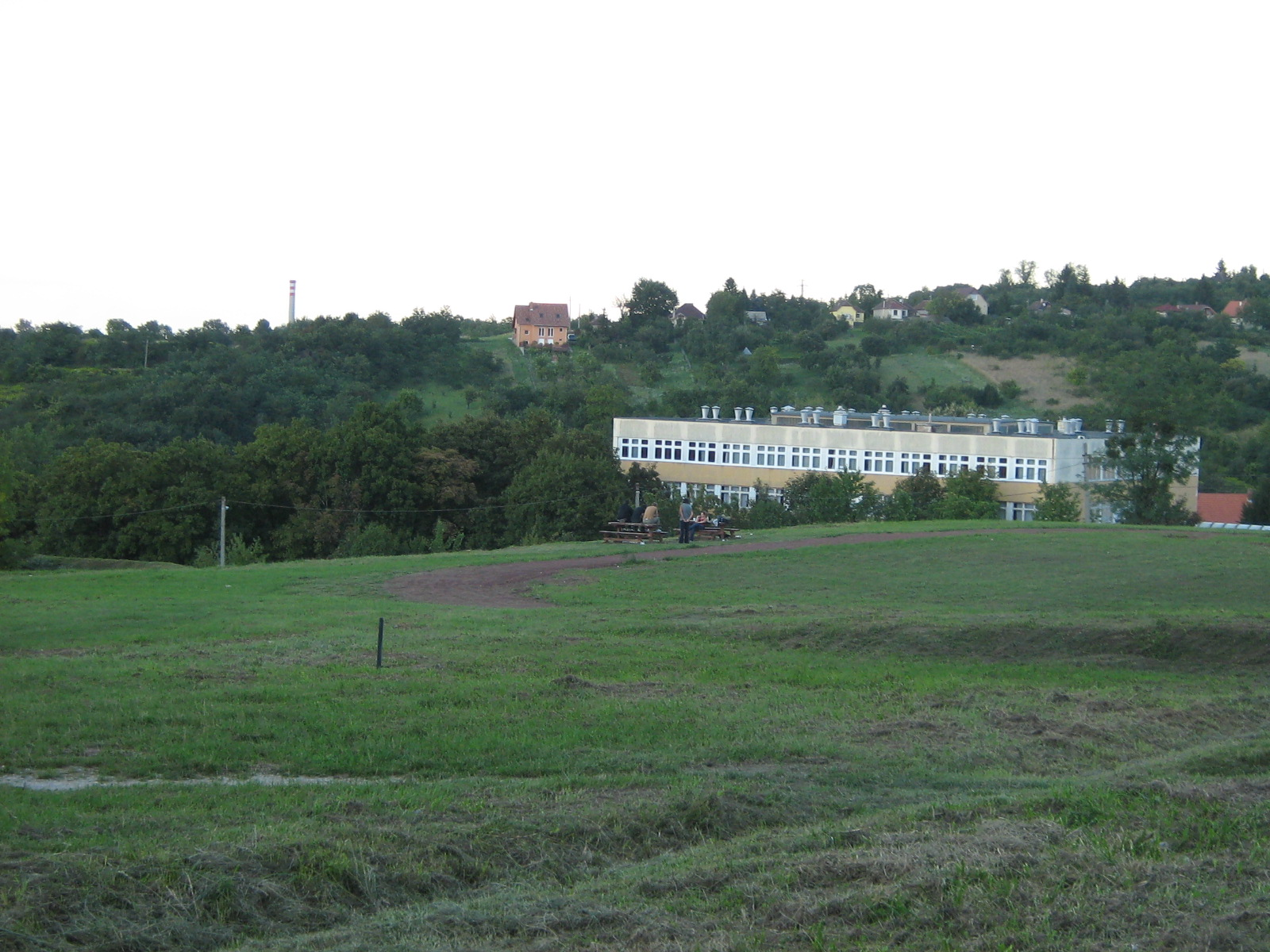
Elementary school

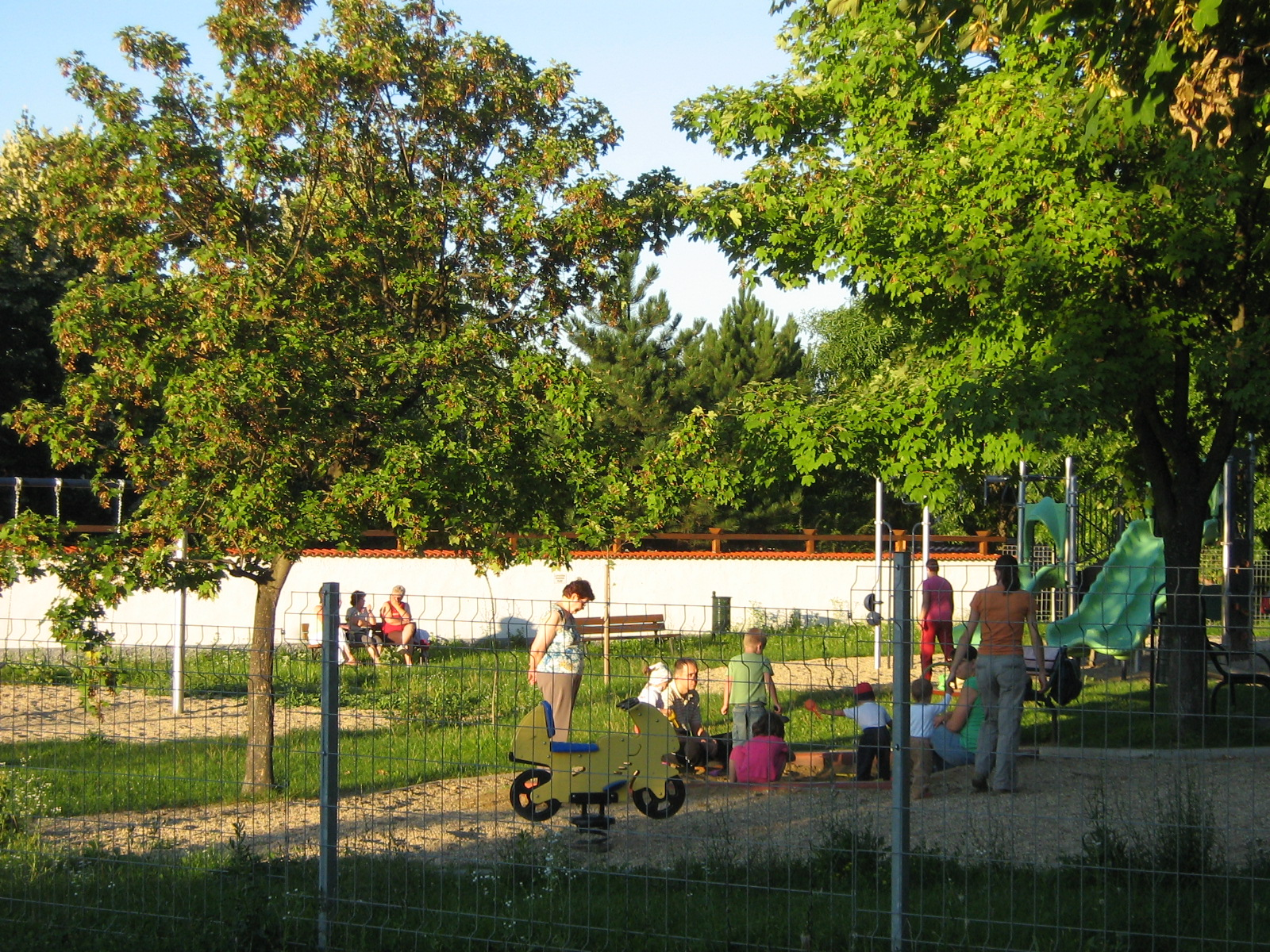
Playground

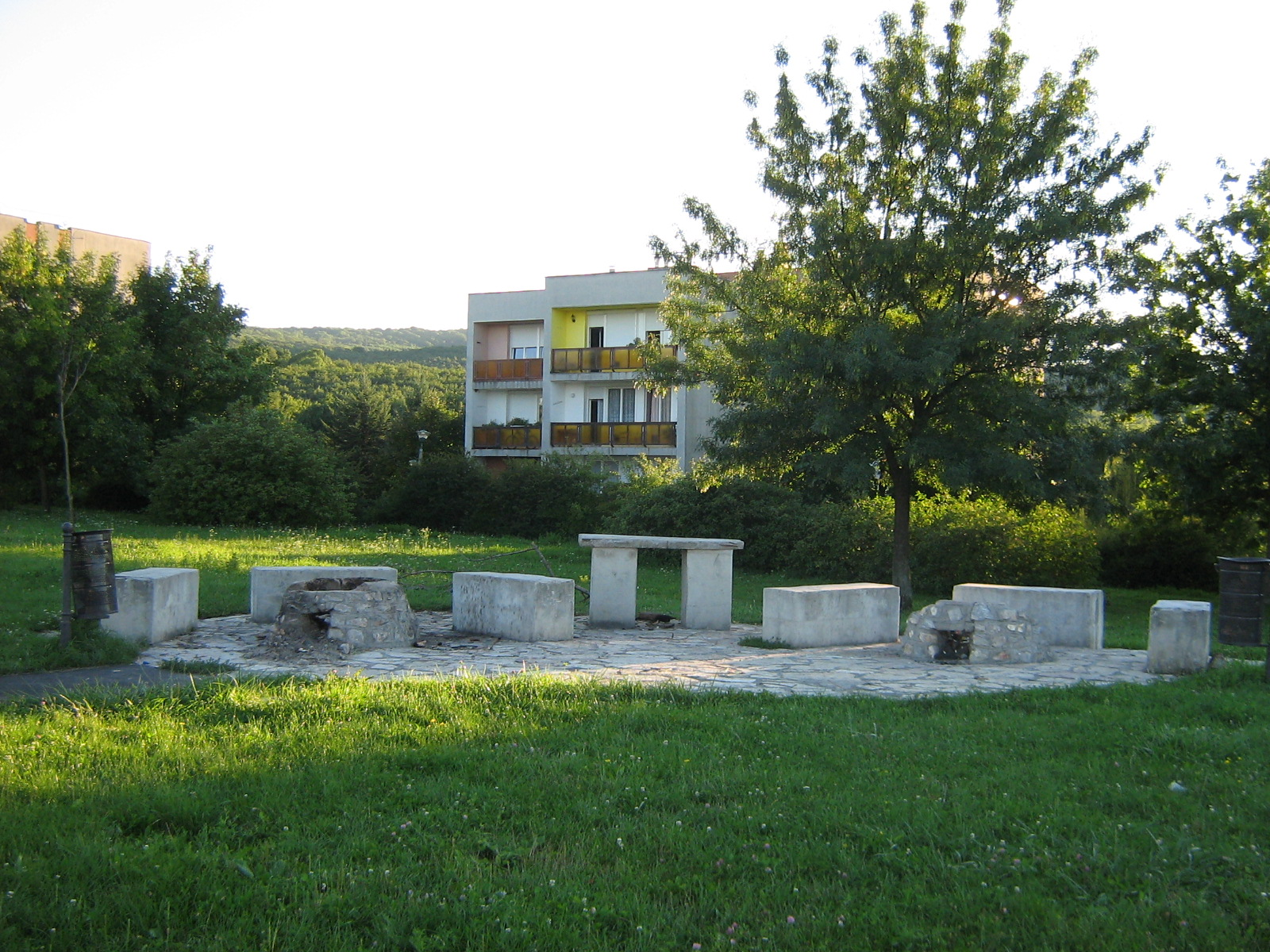
Fireplace

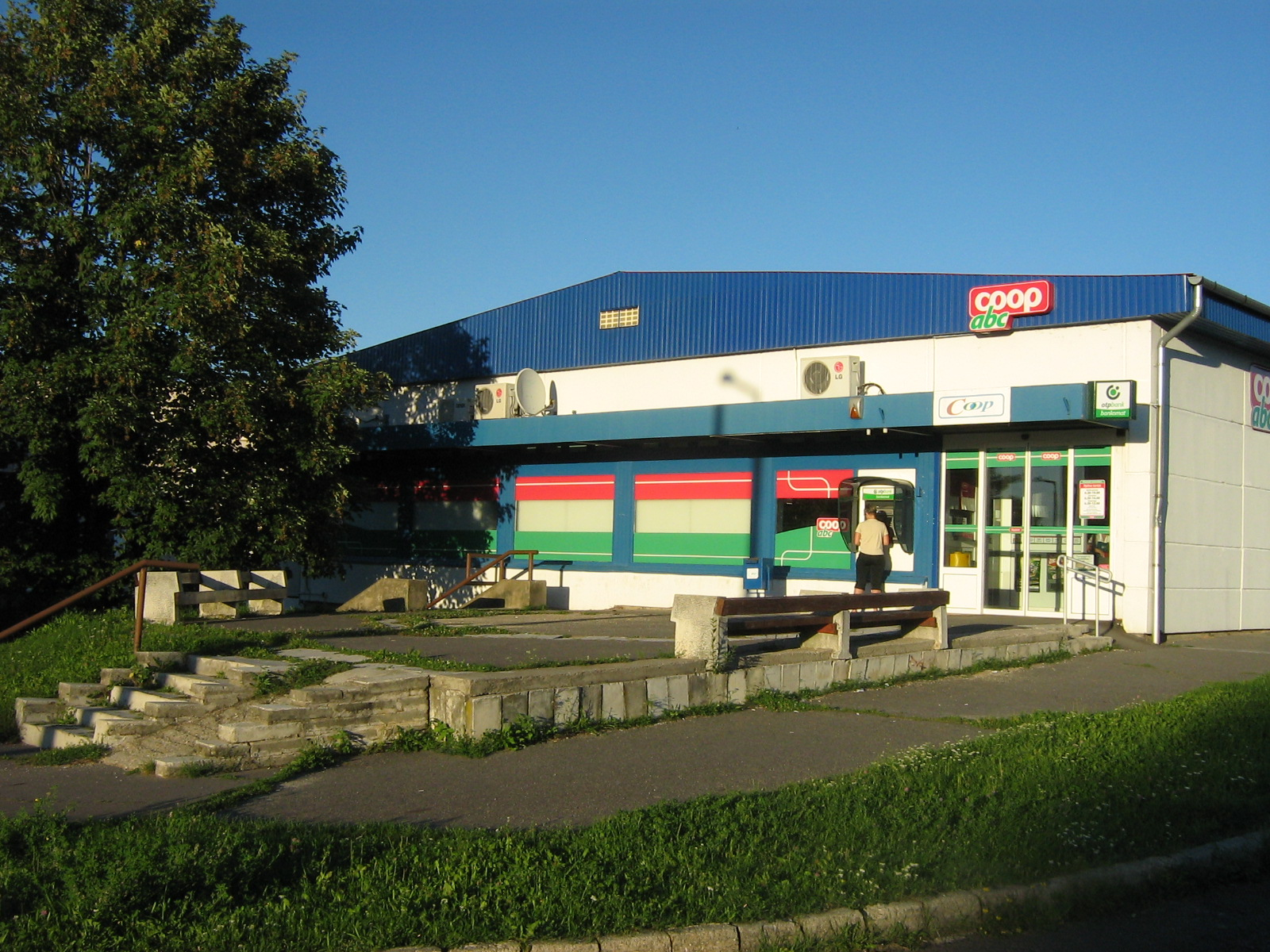
Coop supermarket
