= St. Anne's Church, Miskolc =

St. Anne’s Church
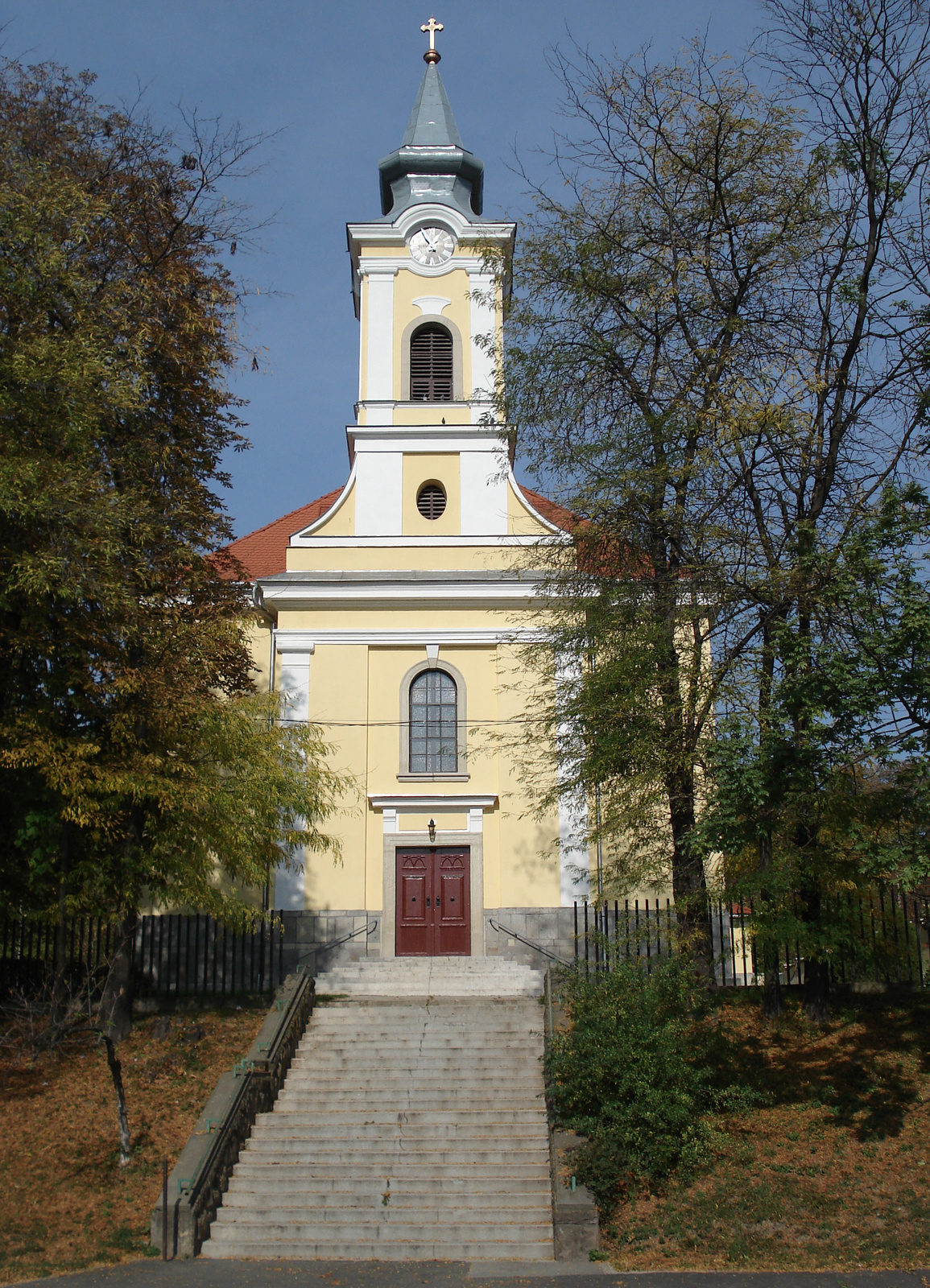
- St. Anne’s Church
- 48°6′17″N 20°45′49″E
- Location: Miskolc
- Country: Hungary
- Denomination: Roman Catholic

History
- Status: Parish church
- Consecrated: August 3, 1823

Architecture
- Functional status: active
- Style: Baroque

Administration
- Diocese: Borsod
- Archdeaconry: Archdiocese of Eger
- Deanery: Miskolc
- Parish: Miskolc-Szent Anna

Clergy
- Priest: Péter Szarvas

The St. Anne's Church (Hungarian: Szent Anna-templom) is a Roman Catholic parish church on St. Anna Square, Miskolc, Hungary. Locally it is often referred to as "Red Church", because of its red roof.

The construction of the building started on July 21, 1816. The church was consecrated on August 3, 1823. The parsonage was completed in 1826, and the church functions as a parish church since then. The church was built in late Baroque style with some Neoclassical elements; the altar and the pulpit are late Neoclassical. The first public clock of the city was in the church's tower.

Actress Róza Széppataki-Déry and the sister of painter Mihály Munkácsy, Cecília Lieb are buried in the church's cemetery.

The church also used to be the end terminus of the first tram line of Miskolc between 1897 (the beginning of tram service) and 1905.
