= National Theatre of Miskolc =

Miskolci Nemzeti Színház
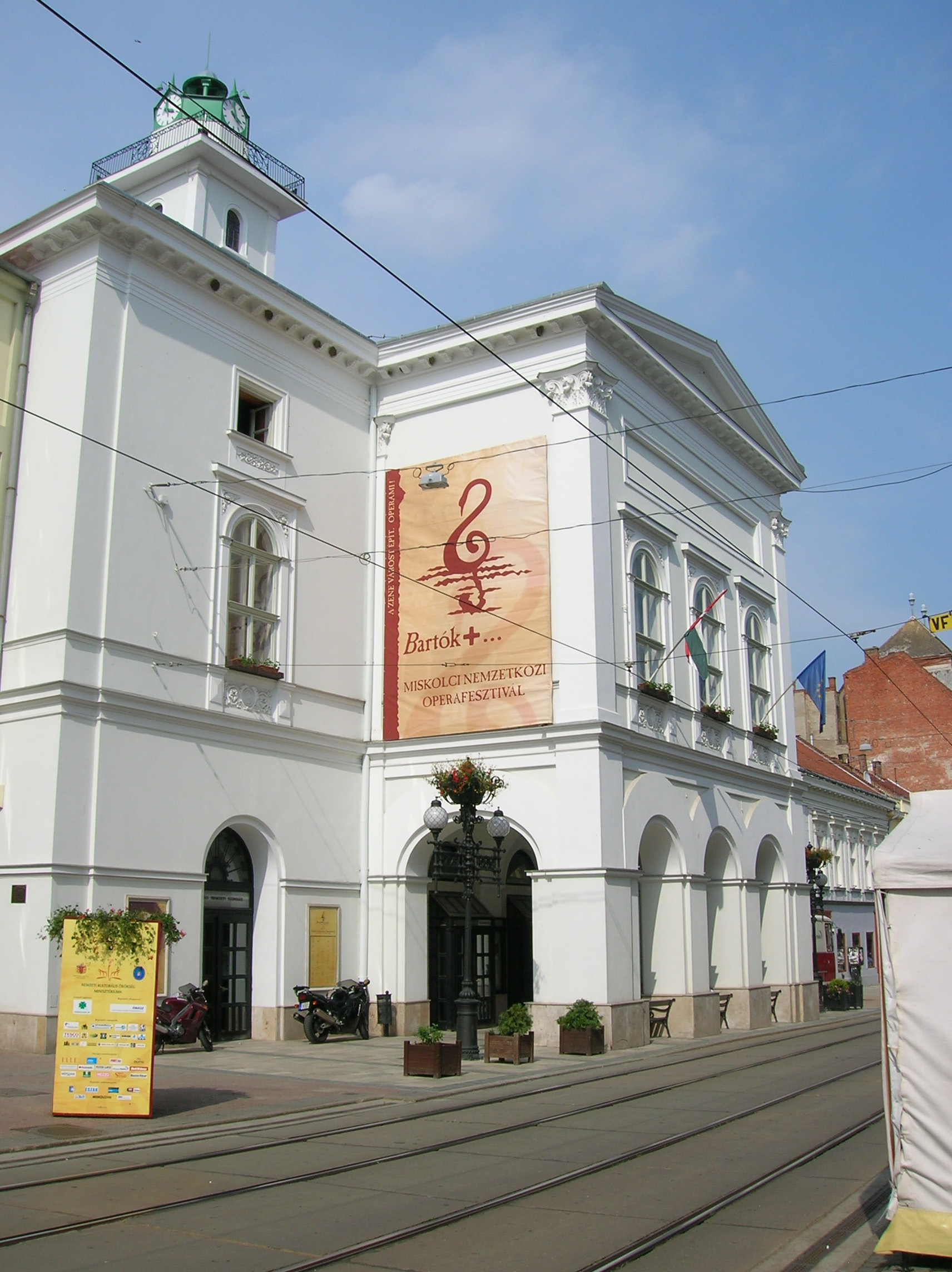
- Interactive map of Miskolci Nemzeti Színház
- Address: Déryné street 1
- Location: Miskolc, Borsod-Abaúj-Zemplén county, Hungary
- Coordinates: 48°6′10.00″N 20°46′59.80″E
- Capacity: 670 (Great hall)
- Type: Theatre

Construction
- Built: 1847–1857
- Opened: 1857
- Renovated: 1880, 1990

Website
- Miskolci Nemzeti Színház

The National Theatre of Miskolc is the main theatre of Miskolc, and the oldest theatre company of Hungary. Its current Classicist and Neo-baroque building built between 1847 and 1857, is in the city centre, in Széchenyi street and is home to not only theatrical plays, but also to events like the International Opera Festival of Miskolc.

== History ==
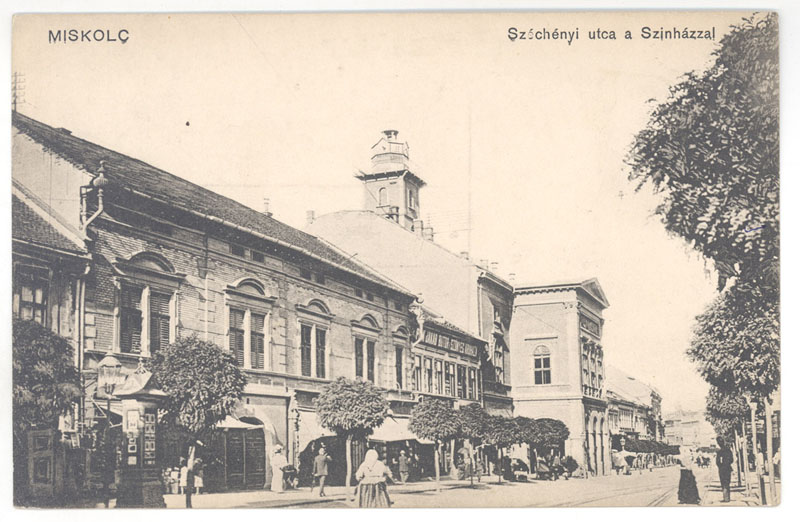
The theatre on a postcard in the early 1900s

The first theatre in Miskolc was built between 1819 and 1823, the second fully stone theatre in the country (the first one being in Kolozsvár) was premiering with A tatárok Magyarországban on 24 August. This structure was destroyed in fire on 19 July 1843. With money from the insurance company and public contributions, construction of a new building has started on 3 September 1847, with a design of József Cassano, but was slowed by the 1848 Revolution and lack of funds. Serious construction speeded up again in the early 1850s, partly with the upcoming visit of Franz Joseph I (the emperor eventually did not take part in the opening ceremony).

After a decade of construction, the theatre opened on 3 September 1857 with the play Marót bán by Mihály Vörösmarty. Its first director was Endre Latabár, the first member of the illustrious Latabár actor-dynasty. For several years, the lower levels of the building were occupied by shops (their rent partly funded the theatre), and the upper levels were home to the National Casino. The theatre was often home to the guest performances of Déryné Széppataki Róza, the most known actress of the era.

The building was reconstructed in 1880, and extending with a fire-watch tower. The theatre, formerly belonging to a joint stock company, became the property of the municipality of Miskolc in 1914.

1990 saw a further extension, enlarging the theatre to twice of its former floor space, 16 000 square meters, including five separate stage halls. The complex is also home to a museum dedicated to the theatrical history of Miskolc.

== Sources ==
- Gyarmati, Béla: Legendák, anekdoták, emlékek a miskolci színjátszás történetéből. Budapest: Nazar Bt., 2007. ISBN 978-963-06-2775-7
- , Early theatre of Miskolc and National Theatre of Miskolc in the Hungarian Theatrical Lexicon (György, Székely. Magyar Színházmuvészeti Lexikon. Budapest: Akadémiai Kiadó, 1994. ISBN 978-963-05-6635-3), freely available on mek.oszk.hu
