= Miskolc Tiszai railway station =

Railway station in Hungary

Coordinates: 48°05′56″N 20°48′35″E

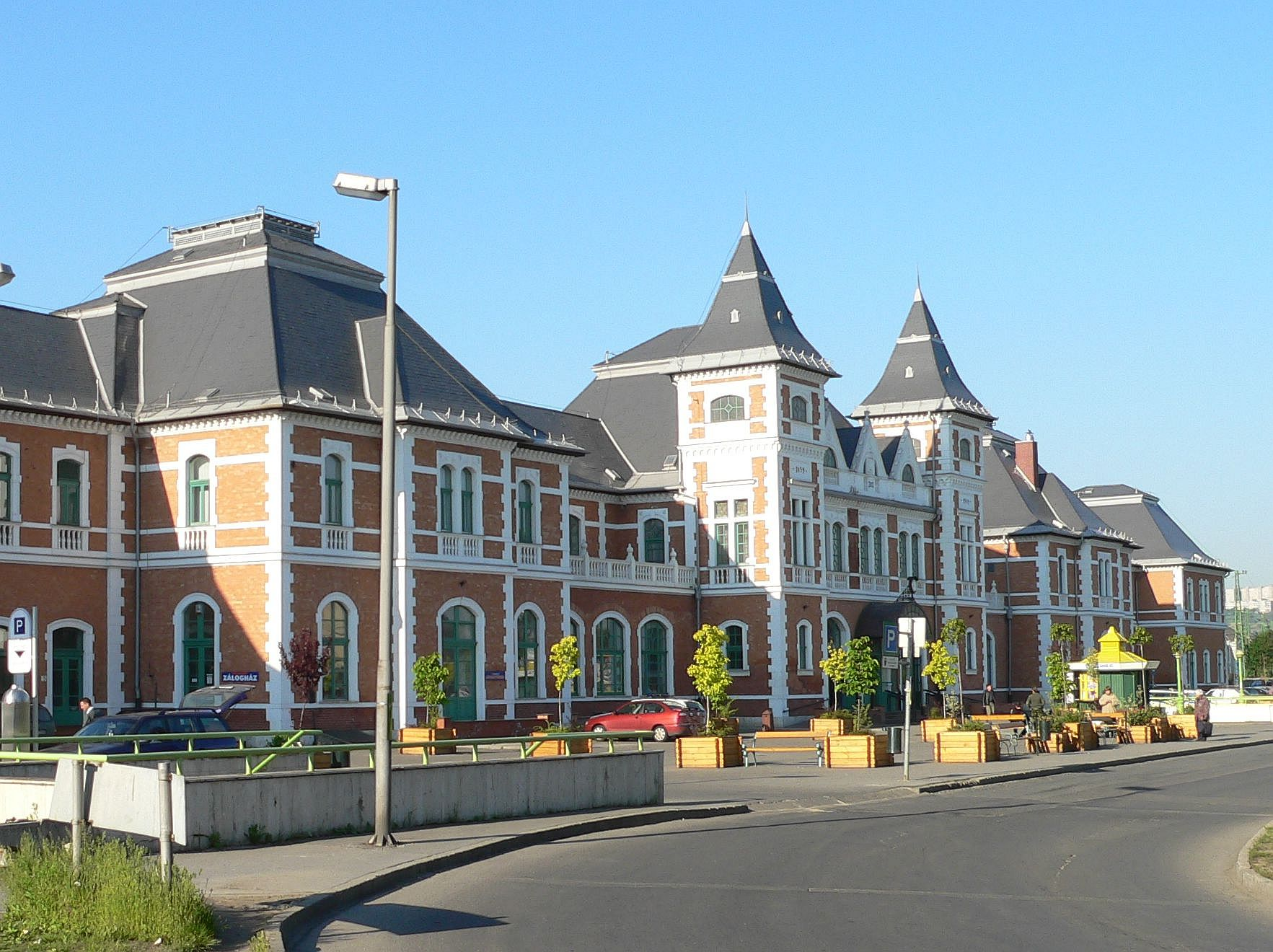
Tiszai Station main building

The Tiszai Railway Station, operated by Hungarian State Railways, is the larger of two railway stations of the city of Miskolc, Hungary. Despite its name, the station is not close to the river Tisza; it was named after the company that built it.

== History ==
Miskolc's need for connection with other cities by railway lines arose in the 1830s. Plans were made to expand the Szolnok–Debrecen railway line towards Nyíregyháza and Miskolc, but due to the political situations of the time – there was a revolution against Habsburg rule in 1848–49 – construction was delayed until 1857.

Disagreements between the railway constructing company and the local government of the city hindered work. The local government wanted the station to be built at the end of Széchenyi Street, the main street of Miskolc, approximately where the Szinvapark shopping mall stands today, and said the area that the constructing company appointed (and where the station was eventually built) was too far from the city – at that time it was indeed about 2.5 kilometres away and the cost of transporting goods from the city to the station was too high for local merchants. Because of the disagreement the local government didn't support the building of the railway lines, and on 24 May 1859 the newly-built station was opened without any opening ceremony. The station was simply called "Miskolc Railway Station" then; it was given its current name in 1959.

In 1860 Miskolc was connected by railway to Košice (then called Kassa, it was the other leading city of Northern Hungary and in many ways a rival of Miskolc), in 1870 the Miskolc-Pest line was ready, and in 1871 the Gömör line was built.

On 2 June 1944 the US Air Force bombed the station as a part of Operation Frantic Joe. Many bombs fell on the city centre instead, claiming 206 lives (420 were wounded).

== The building ==
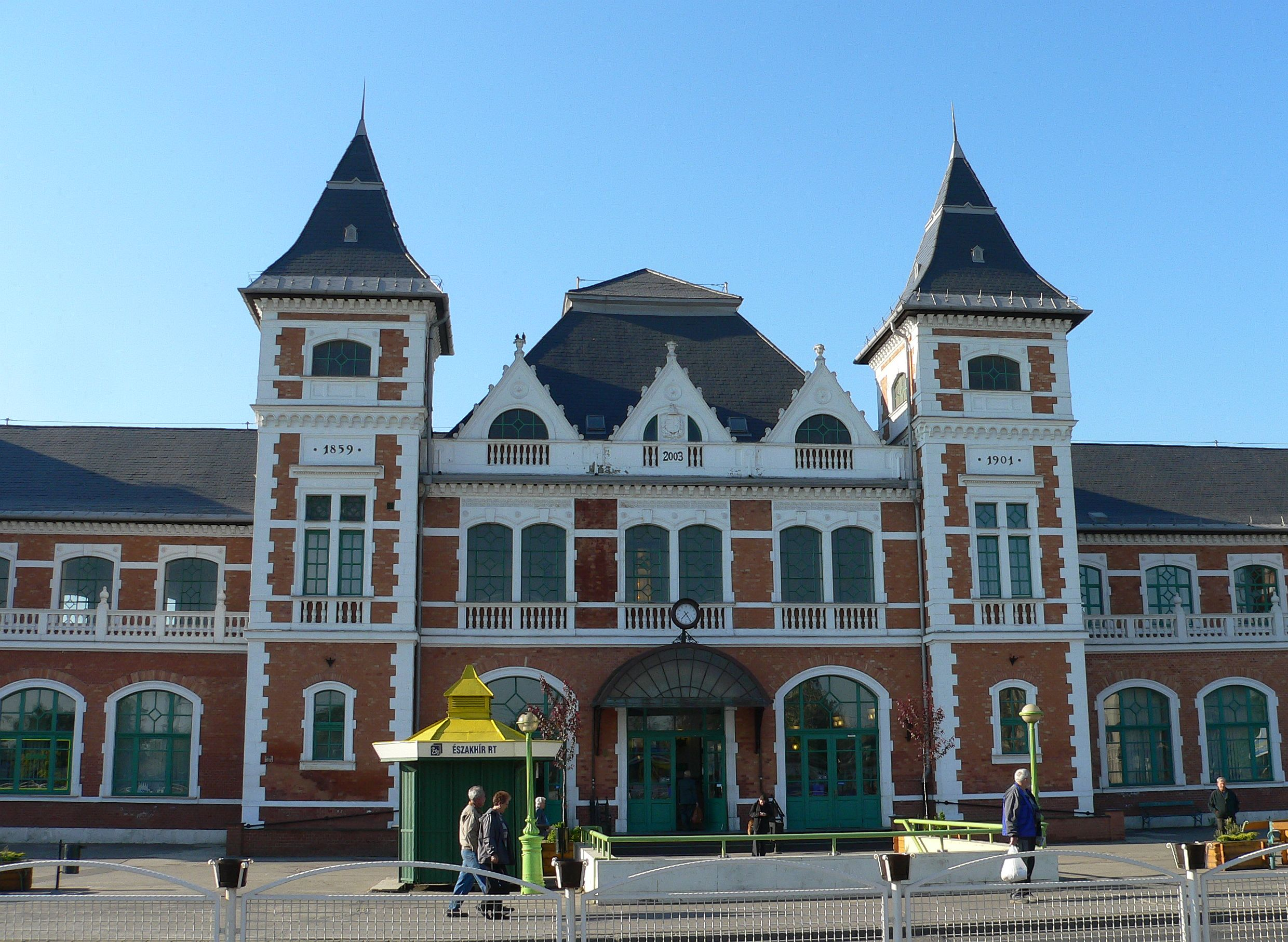
Main entrance of Tiszai Station

The station building that stands today was designed by Ferenc Pfaff and was built in 1901 in eclectic style. It is a listed historic building and was restored recently, in 1999. It was modernized in 2003.

During the construction of the building important archaeological findings were made, indicating a Celtic presence in the area.

== Kandó Kálmán square ==
The square where the station stands is one of the most important traffic hubs of Miskolc. Both of the Miskolc tram lines and several bus lines (1, 1A, 101, 17, 21, 23, 31) of MVK ZRt. have their terminus here. The square is named in honor of Kálmán Kandó (1869–1931), a Hungarian engineer who developed components for electric locomotives.

== Sources ==
- Fejezetek Miskolc történetéből. ed.: Bekes Dezső, Veres László. Miskolc, 1984. ISBN 963-03-1973-X pp. 93–94
- Dobrossy István: Miskolc írásban és képekben. vol. I. Borsod-Abaúj-Zemplén Megyei Levéltár, Miskolc, 2006. ISBN 963-9311-49-9 pp. 79–81
