= Church of St. Ann =

The Church of Saint Ann or Anne, St. Ann's Church, St. Anne's Roman Catholic Church or variations may refer to:

== Albania ==
- St. Anne's Church, Derviçan

== Australia ==
- St Anne's Church, Ryde
- St Anne's Anglican Church, Jondaryan
- St Anne's Catholic Church, North Bondi
- St Anne's Roman Catholic Church, Strathfield South

== Belgium ==
- Church of Saint Anne, Aldeneik

== Belize ==
- St. Ann's Anglican Church

== Canada ==
- St. Anne's Chapel (Fredericton), New Brunswick
- Ste-Anne Catholic Church (Ottawa), Ontario
- St. Anne's Anglican Church, Toronto, Ontario
- Basilica of Sainte-Anne-de-Beaupré, Quebec City, Quebec
- Sainte-Anne de Varennes Basilica, Varennes, Quebec

== China ==
- St. Anne's Church, Moxi, Sichuan

== Denmark ==
- St. Anne's Church, Copenhagen

== Germany ==
- St. Anne's Church, Augsburg

== Hong Kong ==
- St. Anne's Church, Hong Kong

== Israel ==
- Church of Saint Anne, Jerusalem, the traditional birthplace of Mary, mother of Jesus, in the house of her parents, Joachim and Saint Anne

== Hungary ==
- Saint Anne Parish, Budapest
- St. Anne's Church, Miskolc

== India ==
- Church of St. Anne, Talaulim

== Italy ==
- Church of Saint Anne (Alcamo)

== Lithuania ==
- Church of St. Anne, Vilnius

== Malaysia ==
- St. Anne's Church, Bukit Mertajam, Penang

== Malta ==
- St Anne's Chapel, Qrendi

== Peru ==
- Church of Saint Anne, Barrios Altos, Lima

== Poland ==
- St. Anne's Church, Warsaw
- Saint Anne Church, Wrocław

== Republic of Ireland ==
- St. Anne's Church, Ardclough, County Kildare
- St. Ann's Church, Dawson Street, Dublin
- Church of St Anne, Shandon, Cork

== Russia ==
- Annenkirche, Saint Petersburg (St. Ann's Church)

== Singapore ==
- St. Anne's Church, a Catholic church in Sengkang

== United Kingdom ==
=== England ===
- Old St Ann's Church, Warrington, Cheshire
- St Anne's Church, Hessenford, Cornwall
- St Anne's Church, Thwaites, Cumbria
- St Anne's Church, Lewes, East Sussex
- St Ann's Church, Manchester, Greater Manchester
- St Ann's, Stretford, Greater Manchester
- St Anne's Church, Haughton, Greater Manchester
- St Anne's Church, Hindsford, Greater Manchester
- St Wilfrid and St Ann's Church, Newton Heath, Greater Manchester
- Church of St Anne, Royton, Greater Manchester
- St Ann's Church, HMNB Portsmouth, Hampshire
- St Anne's Church, Blackburn, Lancashire
- St Anne's Church, Singleton, Lancashire
- St Anne's Church, St Anne's-on-the-Sea, Lancashire
- St Anne's Church, Turton, Lancashire
- St Anne's Church, Woodplumpton, Lancashire
- St Ann Blackfriars, London
- St Ann's Church, South Tottenham, London
- St Anne and St Agnes, London
- St Anne's Church, Kew, London
- St Anne's Roman Catholic Church, Laxton Place, London
- St Anne's Limehouse, London
- St Anne's Church, Soho, London
- Church of St Anne, Aigburth, Merseyside
- St Anne's Church, Edge Hill, Merseyside
- St Anne's Church, Liverpool (1772–1871), Merseyside
- St Anne's Church, Rock Ferry, Merseyside
- St Anne's Church, Birmingham, West Midlands
- St Anne's Church, Moseley, West Midlands
- St Ann with Emmanuel, Nottingham, Nottinghamshire
- St Ann's Church, Nottingham, a church demolished in 1971
- St Anne's Church, Sutton Bonington, Nottinghamshire
- Church of St Anne, Catterick, North Yorkshire
- St Anne's Church, Ugthorpe, North Yorkshire
- St Anne's Church, Brown Edge, Staffordshire
- St Anne's Church, Chasetown, Staffordshire
- St Anne's Cathedral, Leeds (Leeds Cathedral), West Yorkshire

=== Northern Ireland ===
- St Anne's Cathedral, Belfast

=== Wales ===
- St Anne's Church, Cefn Hengoed, Caerphilly borough. Defunct
- St Anne's Church, Roath, Cardiff. Defunct
- St Anne's Church, Ynyshir, Rhondda Cynon Taf. Active

== United States ==
(by state, then city)

- St. Ann Church (Bridgeport, Connecticut)
- Saint Anne Church (Waterbury, CT)
- St. Anne's Episcopal Church (Middletown, Delaware) (Old St. Anne's Church)
- Saint Ann Catholic Church (Kaneohe, Hawaii)
- St. Anne Catholic Community (Barrington, Illinois)
- Church of St. Anne (Allen, Louisiana)
- St. Anne's Church and Mission Site, Old Town, Maine
- St. Anne's Church (Annapolis, Maryland)
- Chapel of St. Anne (Arlington, Massachusetts)
- St. Anne's Church and Parish Complex (Fall River, Massachusetts)
- Ste. Anne de Detroit Catholic Church, Detroit, Michigan
- Sainte Anne Church (Mackinac Island), Michigan
- St. Anne Church (Berlin, New Hampshire)
- St. Ann's Episcopal Church (Bronx), New York
- St. Ann & the Holy Trinity Church, Brooklyn, New York
- St. Ann Church (East Harlem), New York
- St. Ann's Federation Building, Hornell, New York
- St. Ann Church (East Village, Manhattan), New York
- St. Ann Roman Catholic Church Complex, Toledo, Ohio
- Saint Anne Church (Philadelphia), Pennsylvania
- St. Ann's Church Complex (Woonsocket, Rhode Island)
- St. Ann's Catholic Church of Badus, Ramona, South Dakota
- Kearns-St. Ann's Orphanage, Salt Lake City, Utah
- Saint Ann's Catholic Church
- Glebe House of St. Anne's Parish, Champlain, Virginia
- St. Anne's Roman Catholic Church (Marysville, Washington)
- St. Anne Chapel, Frenchtown, US Virgin Islands
- St. Ann Catholic Parish (Stoughton, Wisconsin), part of the Roman Catholic Diocese of Madison

== Vatican ==
- Sant'Anna dei Palafrenieri (Church of Saint Anne in the Vatican)

== See also ==
- St Anne's Cathedral (disambiguation)
- St. Anne's Chapel (disambiguation)
- St. Ann's Episcopal Church (disambiguation)
- Small Church of Saint Anne (disambiguation)
- Saint Anne (disambiguation)
- St Ann's (disambiguation)
