= Chapel of Sant'Anna, Alcamo =

Church building in Alcamo, Italy

Chapel of Sant'Anna
- Chiesetta di Sant'Anna
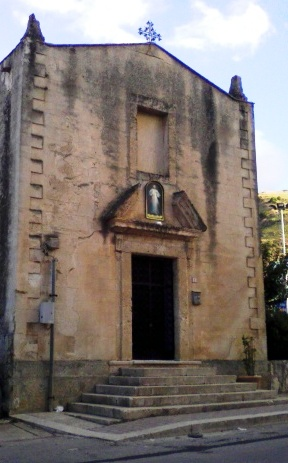
- The façade

Religion
- Affiliation: Catholic
- Patron: Saint Anne

Location
- Location: Alcamo, Trapani, Italy
- Interactive map of Chapel of Sant'Anna
- Coordinates: 37°58′24″N 12°57′18″E

The chapel of Sant'Anna is a Catholic church located in Alcamo, in the Italian province of Trapani.

== History ==
The first time it was called a chapel dates back to a notarial deed in 1582; De Blasi affirms that, on 15 January 1653, the baron Francesco Triolo received by Pope Innocentius X the licence to transform the chapel into a Church, and adds that its roof had been collapsed for several years.

The Church was reconstructed after 1845: among the registered possessions of the baron Benedetto Triolo in the same year, there was only a building "with a room on the ground-floor and two on the first floor, a millstone and a warehouse in that district.

The two brothers, Stefano and Giuseppe Triolo, patriots of the revolutionary uprisings in 1848 and 1860, were buried there; according to the historians’ assertions, confirmed by the documents of that period, the three brothers did everything possible for the attainment of the unity of Italy, both by conspiracy and a great financial support.

In 1954 the municipal authorities were forced to wall up the entrance door because of the bad state of neglect in which it was at that time: actually vandals had removed the marble gravestones with the epigraphs of the famous brothers.

== The church ==
In 1960 the pharmacist Marianna Raccuglia, signor Manno's widow, and her children gave the small Church of Sant'Anna, closed to service at that time and containing the bodies of the heroic brothers Stefano and Giuseppe of the barons Sant'Anna to the town municipality, subject to their right of property resulting from the contract of sale drawn up on 6 April 1948 by the notary Mistretta Antonino, registered in Alcamo at n°1746, with the express and provided that the municipality will restore this chapel within 6 months, and take care of it in order to make accessible the graves of the heroic brothers Sant’Anna to visitors.

The committee for the celebrations of the first Centenary of the unity of Italy, had the Church restored and built two memorial stones with the inscriptions, composed by Monsignor Tommaso Papa, to commemorate the two Triolo brothers into a wall, and three other on the floor with their names: Benedetto, Stefano and Giuseppe.

== See also ==
- Alcamo
- Church of Jesus Christ the Redeemer
- Church of the Holy Souls in Purgatory (Alcamo)
- Mount Bonifato
- Salesians of Don Bosco

== Sources ==
- Cataldo Carlo: Accanto alle aquile: Il castello alcamese di Bonifato e la chiesa di S. Maria dell’Alto p. 108-110; Brotto, Palermo,1991
- Cataldo Carlo: La Casa del Sole- storia, folklore e cultura di Sicilia p. 232; Campo, Alcamo, 1999
- Cataldo Carlo: Alcamo e Garibaldi; Campo, Alcamo, 1984
