= Small Church of Saint Anne =

Small Church of Saint Anne or Chiesetta di Sant'Anna may refer to

- Small Church of Saint Anne (Alcamo)
- Small Church of Saint Anne (Brugherio)

== See also ==
- Church of St. Ann (disambiguation)
