= St. Anne's Chapel =

St. Anne's Chapel may refer to:

- St Ann's Chapel, Cornwall, England
- St Anne's Chapel, Dwejra, Gozo (Malta)
- St. Anne's Chapel (Fredericton), Canada
- Chapel of St Anne, Fort St Elmo, Valletta, Malta
- St. Anne Chapel, Inagoj, New Caledonia
- St. Anne's Chapel, Pińczów, Poland
- St Anne's Chapel, Qrendi, Malta
- St Anne's Chapel, St Ouen's Manor, Jersey
