= Listed buildings in Brown Edge =

Brown Edge is a civil parish in the district of Staffordshire Moorlands, Staffordshire, England. It contains six listed buildings that are recorded in the National Heritage List for England. All the listed buildings are designated at Grade II, the lowest of the three grades, which is applied to "buildings of national importance and special interest". The parish contains the village of Brown Edge and the surrounding area. The listed buildings consist of three farmhouses, a former watermill, a church, and a coach house.

== Buildings ==
Name and location	Photograph	Date	Notes
Lower Stone House Farmhouse; 53.08619°N 2.14606°W	—	Late 16th or early 17th century	The farmhouse was altered and extended in the 19th century. It is in stone, and has a tile roof with verge parapets on the west. There are two storeys and a cellar, a front of three bays, and a 19th-century timber framed extension to the east. The windows have chamfered mullions, and inside there are timber-framed partitions.
Annats Farmhouse; 53.06964°N 2.14575°W	—	1686	The farmhouse is in rendered stone on a plinth, with quoins, and a tile roof with verge parapets. There are three storeys and three bays. Above the central doorway is a datestone, and the windows are casements with chamfered mullions and keystones.
Boardmans Bank Farmhouse; 53.08331°N 2.14362°W	—	1742	The farmhouse is in stone on a plinth, with quoins, and a red tile roof with pitched verge parapets. There are two storeys and three bays. The central doorway has an inscribed and dated Tudor arched lintel. The windows are casements with chamfered surrounds.
Knypersley Mill; 53.09002°N 2.15692°W	—	1827	The former watermill has been converted for residential use. It is in red sandstone with rusticated dressings, string courses, and a tile roof with verge parapets on corbelled kneelers. There are three storeys and four bays. The building has two doorways with segmental heads, and above the left door is a dated plaque. The windows are casements, also with segmental heads.
St Anne's Church; 53.08329°N 2.14299°W		1844	The steeple was added in 1854. The church is built in stone with a tile roof, and is in Neo-Norman style. It consists of a nave, a south porch, a chancel, and a northeast steeple, and on the west gable is a bellcote. The steeple has a tower with three stages, buttresses, a west doorway, a circular stair turret with a conical roof to the northeast, a zig-zag frieze with grotesque-head corbels, gargoyles, and a square spire with paired lucarnes.
Coach house north of St Anne's Church; 53.08356°N 2.14316°W	—	1846	The coach house is in stone and has a tile roof with verge parapets and poppy-head finials. It is built into a bank, and the north side has two storeys. On the north front there is a carriage arch with an elliptical head and a stable door. The upper floor contains three casement windows, a datestone, and a doorway, in front of which is a balcony with wrought iron railings approached from the west by external steps. On the west front is a three-sided bay window with a hipped roof.
