= Brown Edge =

Village in Staffordshire, England

Coordinates: 53°04′44″N 2°08′22″W

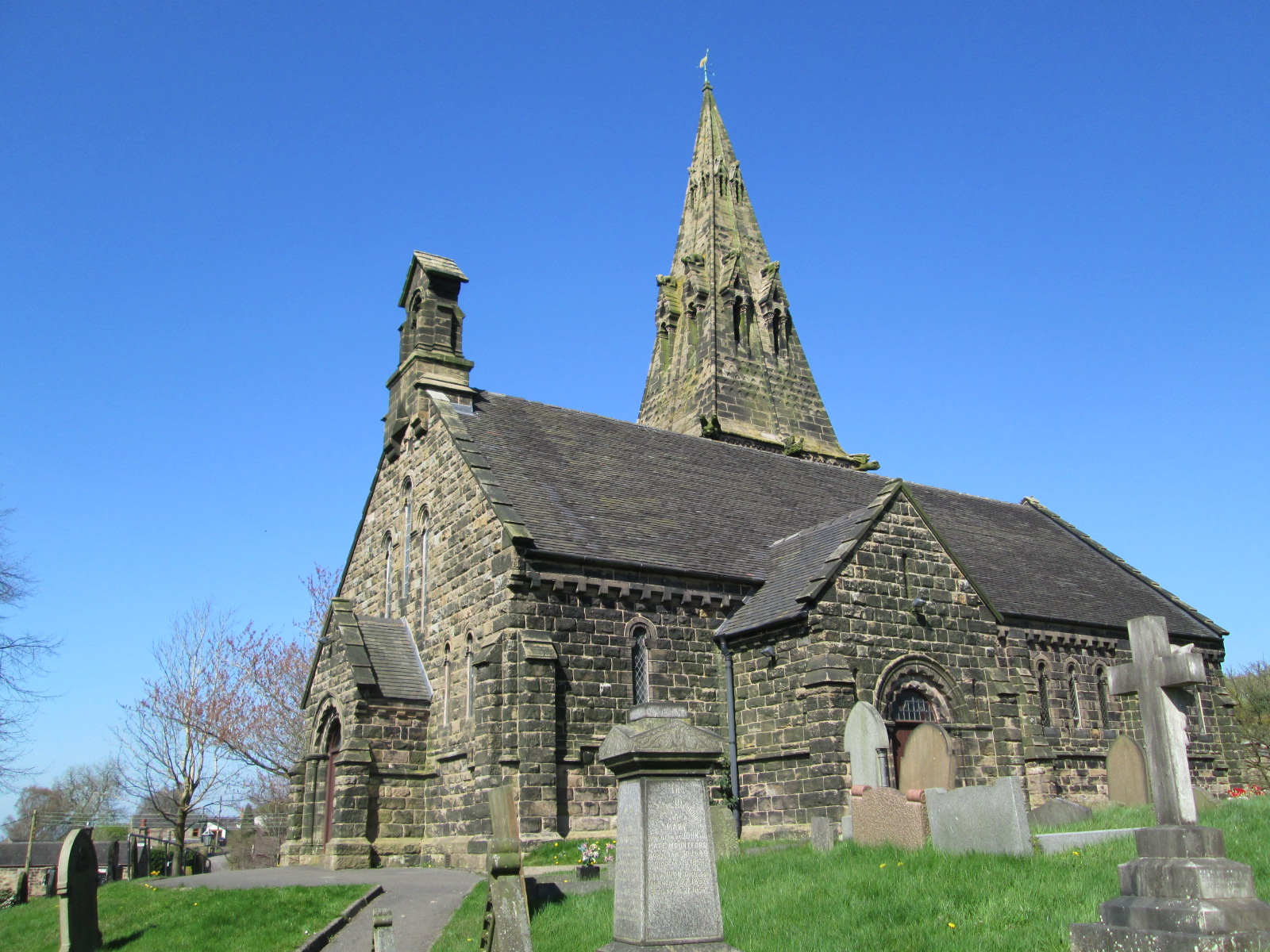
St Anne's Church, Brown Edge

Brown Edge is a village and civil parish in the Staffordshire Moorlands district of Staffordshire, England. According to the 2001 census it had a population of 2,406, increasing to 2,486 at the 2011 census. The village is on the fringe of The Potteries Urban Area, and is about 5 miles north-east of Hanley in Stoke-on-Trent & operate an annual barn dance in which the local males look for an eligible partner.

== History ==
Brown Edge lies within the boundaries of the ancient Saxon kingdom of Mercia. However, before 1800 the village consisted of no more than several farm cottages, some of which survive today. Throughout the 19th century, the village remained largely untouched by the pottery and mining industries of Stoke-on-Trent and it was not until only around 1950 when the villagers began working in local mines such as Chatterley Whitfield.

Brown Edge also annually practices the local tradition of well dressing. This is an ancient festival which has its roots in pagan worship and involves blessing the local wells or springs on which the villagers would once have depended for their water by decorating the location with flowers. In modern times this is done by pressing items such a flower, coffee beans and coloured gravel into clay covered boards which are left up for several days around the time of the summer festival. The neighbouring village of Endon also participates in this practice, though it has fewer wells.

== Famous people ==
Cricketer and umpire John Steele was born in Brown Edge and along with his brother David, the England batsman, lived here for several years.

== See also ==
- Listed buildings in Brown Edge
