= Listed buildings in Royton =

Royton is a town in the Metropolitan Borough of Oldham, Greater Manchester, England and it is unparished. It contains five listed buildings that are recorded in the National Heritage List for England. Of these, one is listed at Grade II*, the middle grade, and the others are at Grade II, the lowest grade. The area was rural until the coming of the Industrial Revolution when the town grew due to the cotton industry. The listed buildings consist of a house, a farm building, two churches and a cotton mill.

== Key ==
Grade	Criteria
II*	Particularly important buildings of more than special interest
II	Buildings of national importance and special interest

== Buildings ==
Name and location	Photograph	Date	Notes	Grade
11 and 12 Royton Thorp; 53.56951°N 2.13486°W	—	17th century	One house, later divided into two, it was originally timber framed and later partly rebuilt in brick, and partly in brick on a stone plinth with quoins. It consists of a main range and a cross-wing. The windows are replacement sashes, and in the left gable is a raised corbel-band, brickwork in diamond patterns, and an owl hole.	II
Barn, Royton Thorp; 53.56944°N 2.13530°W	—	18th century	The barn is in stone with quoins, extensions in brick, and a stone-slate roof. There two opposed cart entries with timber lintels, one of which is blocked, windows and doors, one of which is at first floor level.	II
St Paul's Church; 53.56542°N 2.12585°W		1884–1889	The church is in stone and has a slate roof with coped gables, and is in Gothic Revival style. It consists of a nave with a clerestory, north and south aisles, a chancel with a chapel, organ chamber and vestry, and a north west steeple. The steeple has a tower with doorways on the north and west sides, an octagonal southwest stair turret, and a broach spire with gabled lucarnes. The east and west windows each have five lights and contain Geometrical tracery.	II
Lion Mill; 53.56521°N 2.11099°W		1890	A former steam-powered cotton spinning mill, with a cast iron and steel frame and brick cladding. It has five storeys and sides of 23 and ten bays, with panelled pilasters and narrow windows. At the northeast corner is a tower with lettering in white, and a balustraded parapet, and there is another tower at the southwest corner. There is also an engine house, a chimney, and a detached office building, and a warehouse.	II
St Anne's Church; 53.56005°N 2.12243°W		1908–09	The church was designed by Temple Moore, and the tower was added in 1926–27. It is in stone with a tiled roof, and consists of a nave, passage aisles and a chancel under one roof, a lean-to baptistry and porches at the west end, a flat-roofed Lady Chapel at the east end flanked by lean-to vestries, a north transept forming an organ chamber, and a south tower. The tower has five stages, a corner stair turret, bands between the stages, and an embattled parapet.	II*
