= St. Stanislaus Kostka Parish, Waterbury =

Coordinates: 41°33′44.8″N 73°01′41.7″W

St. Stanislaus Kostka Parish
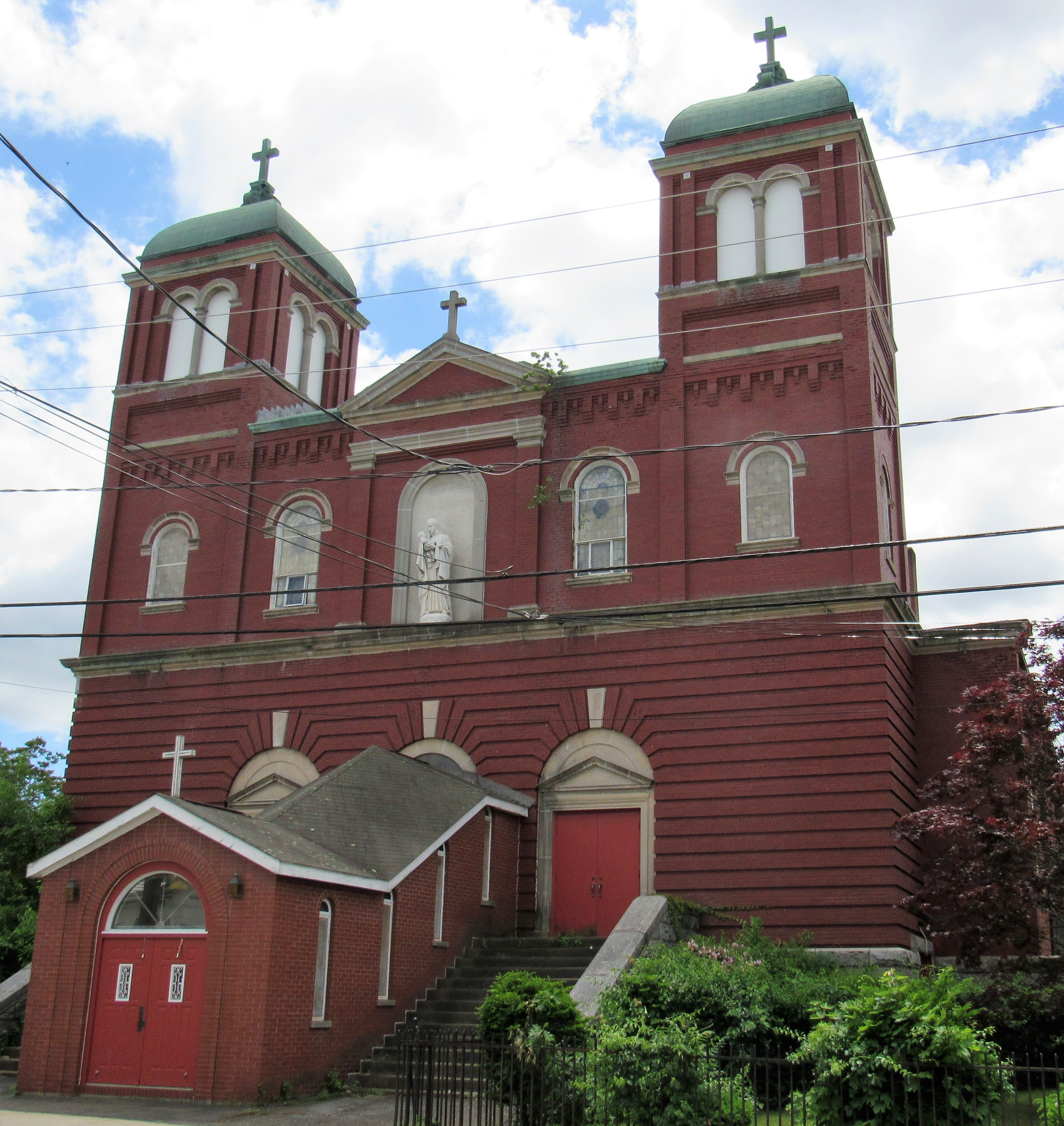
- St. Stanislaus Kostka Parish
- Location: 86 East Farm Street; Waterbury, Connecticut
- Country: United States
- Denomination: Roman Catholic

History
- Founded: January 30, 1913
- Founder: Polish immigrants
- Dedication: St. Stanislaus Kostka
- Dedicated: September 26, 1926

Architecture
- Closed: 2017; Consolidated with All Saints Parish

Administration
- Division: Vicariate: Waterbury
- Province: Hartford
- Archdiocese: Hartford

Clergy
- Archbishop: Most Rev. Christopher J. Coyne

St. Stanislaus Kostka Parish is a former parish in Waterbury, Connecticut, United States, originally designated for Polish immigrants.

Founded on January 30, 1913, it was one of the Polish-American Roman Catholic parishes in New England in the Archdiocese of Hartford. In 2017, the parish was merged with Saint Anne Church in the south end to form All Saints Parish. The building was closed for regularly scheduled worship and subsequently sold to a Pentecostal church.

== History ==
On July 7, 1912, Bishop John Joseph Nilan appointed Fr. Ignatius Maciejewski as administrator of a Polish parish in Waterbury. The priest soon celebrated the first parish Mass in the chapel of Our Lady of Lourdes Church, which the Polish immigrants had rented.

St. Stanislaus Kostka Parish was legally founded on January 30, 1913. Land on East Farm Street was purchased from the Immaculate Conception parish for a church. On August 13, 1914, Bishop John Joseph Nilan named Fr. Theodore Zimmerman the first resident pastor.

The gray granite foundation having been laid, the church cornerstone was blessed on September 14, 1914. The first Mass was celebrated in the completed edifice on October 24, 1915. The completed church superstructure was dedicated on September 26, 1926.

== Bibliography ==
- The 150th Anniversary of Polish-American Pastoral Ministry. Webster, Massachusetts: St. Joseph Basilica. September 11, 2005.
- The Official Catholic Directory in USA
