= Anime Sante, Alcamo =

Church building in Alcamo, Italy

Anime Sante
- Chiesa delle Anime Sante
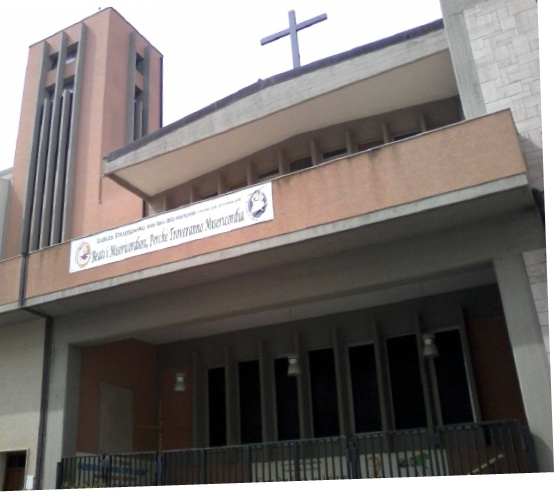
- The façade

Religion
- Affiliation: Salesians
- Province: province of Trapani
- Region: Sicily
- Rite: Catholic

Location
- Location: Alcamo, province of Trapani, Italy
- Municipality: Alcamo
- State: Italy
- Interactive map of Anime Sante
- Territory: Alcamo
- Coordinates: 37°58′49″N 12°57′16″E

Architecture
- Architect: Giacomo Leone
- Type: modern
- Groundbreaking: 1958

Anime Sante ("Holy Souls") is a Catholic church located in Alcamo, in the province of Trapani.

Adjoining it there is the Salesian Oratory of Don Bosco

== History ==
The church, even if it had been planned in 1577, was built only in 1813 by Company of the Holy Monte di Pietà, near the cemetery of the plague victims which was located in contrada Sant'Ippolito, whose church gave the name to a casale (hamlet) among the oldest ones in Alcamo. After the falling down of the old Church of Sant'Ippolito at the end of the 18th century, there was the need for a new church (1816), which was dedicated to the Holy Souls of Purgatory.

As it was falling, the church was left and the tombs destroyed: the bones and mortal remains were moved to common graves in the cemetery of Spirito Santo and the land was given to the town municipality as a limestone quarry.

In 1942 it became an autonomous parish; in 1937 they built the clergy house and, in 1964, the crypt under the structure of the present church was consecrated.

== the Salesians ==
The Salesians, founded in 1855 by Saint John Bosco, in order to give instruction to children from poor families, had the approbation by Pope Pius IX in 1874.[3] Since October 5, 1958, the first Salesians (Don Girolamo Giardina, as the Parson, Don Giuseppe Falzone as the Director of the Oratorio, and the assistant Antonino Miraglia), inaugurated the long-awaited Salesian Home. After so many bureaucratic difficulties, they succeeded in founding the Oratory Don Bosco (Salesian Centre for Youth) in the premises next to the parish Church of the Holy Souls, which was built by them on the same place of the old 19th-century church.

During the period of their presence in Alcamo, the Salesians together with liturgical activities, have made several cultural, recreational activities, and above all, theatre for young people: just remember in 2014 an important and successful project which involved a lot of teenagers and educators of the community, Don Bosco the musical. Besides, from 1969 to 1974, they published, under the direction of P.F. Mistretta, a periodical with the title: God's Family, a fortnightly news bulletin of the parish of the Holy Souls and of the Salesian Organization in Alcamo.

Since 1928 there is the Congregation of the Third Order of the Carmelites of Saint Teresa of Avila: it is still existing and they venerate a statue of Saint Teresa inside the church.

== Description and works ==
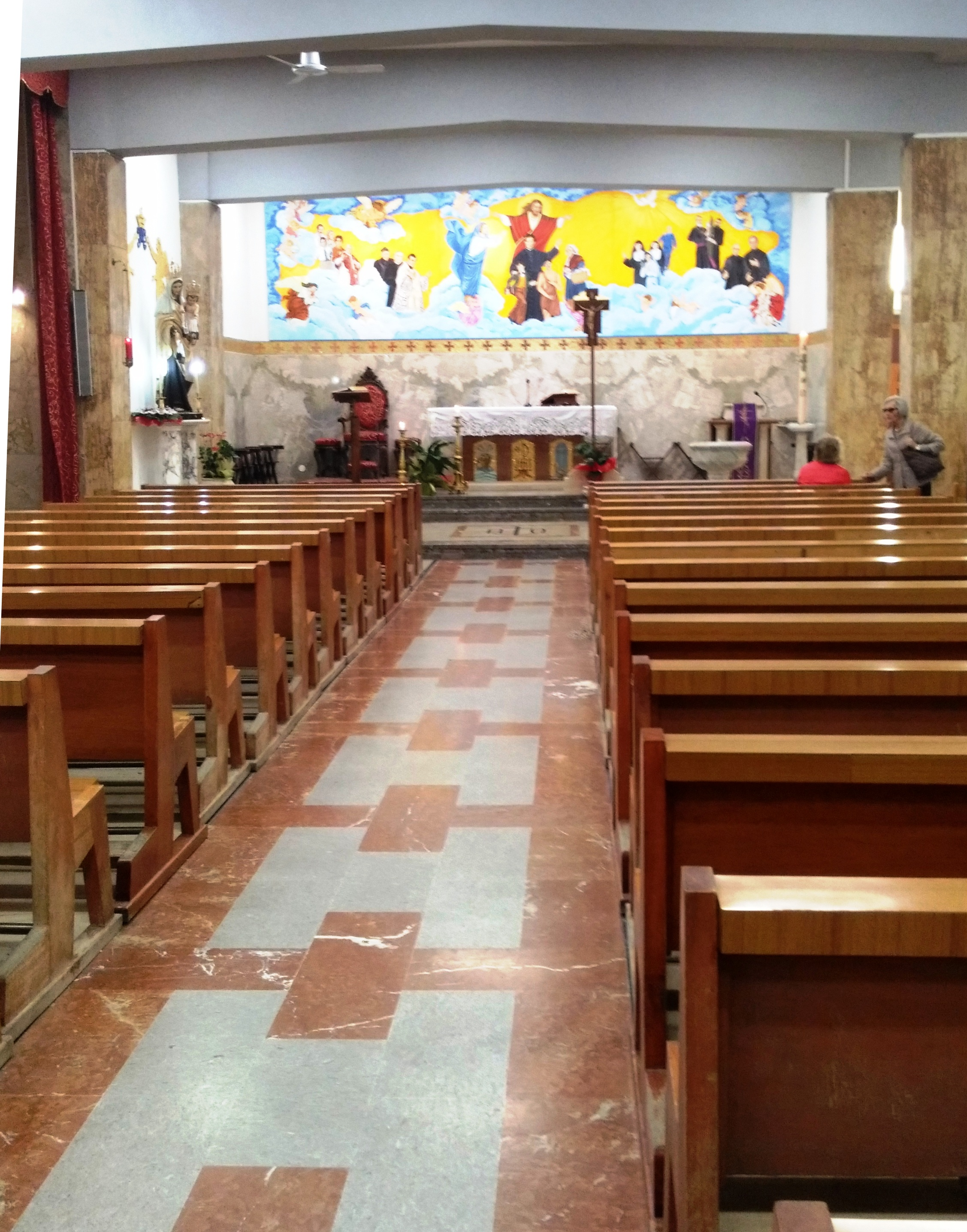
The crypt

The church with one nave, at first had only an altar, for which the painter Raffaele Genovese (from Palermo) realized in 1854 a great canvas representing the Souls of Purgatory, with Our Lady of Miracles above them, and Saint Rocco e Saint Sebastian at the two sides: this painting was lost later.

Elevated to a subsidiary parish in 1919 and autonomous one in 1942, the church was assigned to Salesians in 1958: they demolished it and built the present one, in modern style, after the design of Giacomo Leone, an architect from Catania.

Inside the crypt, on the right wall, there is a small statue of Saint Thérèse of Lisieux, then a copy of the painting representing the Holy Souls of Purgatory realized by Pietro Novelli and placed on the high altar of the Church of Saint Olivia in Alcamo and a statue of Saint Giovanni Bosco; on the left side there is a statue of Saint Domenico Savio, a painting of Saint Joseph with the Child Jesus, and a statue of the Holy Heart of Jesus.

After it there is a statue of Our Lady of Mount Carmel on a pedestal, while on the high altar you can see a Panel painting, where there are the figures of Jesus behind Saint Giovanni Bosco, Mary, mother of Jesus and various groups of Salesian priests and prelates on both sides, with a lot of angels around.

== See also ==
- Salesiani di Don Bosco
- Teresian Carmelites of Verapoly

== Sources ==
- Carlo Cataldo: Guida storico-artistica dei beni culturali di Alcamo-Calatafimi-Castellammare Golfo p. 82; Sarograf, Alcamo, 1982
- Carlo Cataldo: La conchiglia di S.Giacomo p. 238; Campo, Alcamo, 2001
- Tommaso Papa: La Chiesa delle Anime Sante e lo Spirito di S.Giovanni Bosco in Alcamo; Vento; Trapani, 1965
- Salvatore Messina, Alcamo nella storia, nella leggenda e nell'arte, Alcamo, Campo, 2015
