= St. Anne's Church, Derviçan =

Cultural Monument in Albania

St. Anne's Church
- Rrenojat e Kishës së Shën Anës (Albanian)
- Location: Derviçan

Cultural Monument of Albania

St. Anne's Church (Albanian: Rrenojat e Kishës së Shën Anës) is a ruined church in Derviçan, Gjirokastër County, Albania. It is a Cultural Monument of Albania.
