= St. Ann Roman Catholic Church Complex =

Historic church in Ohio, United States

- U.S. National Register of Historic Places
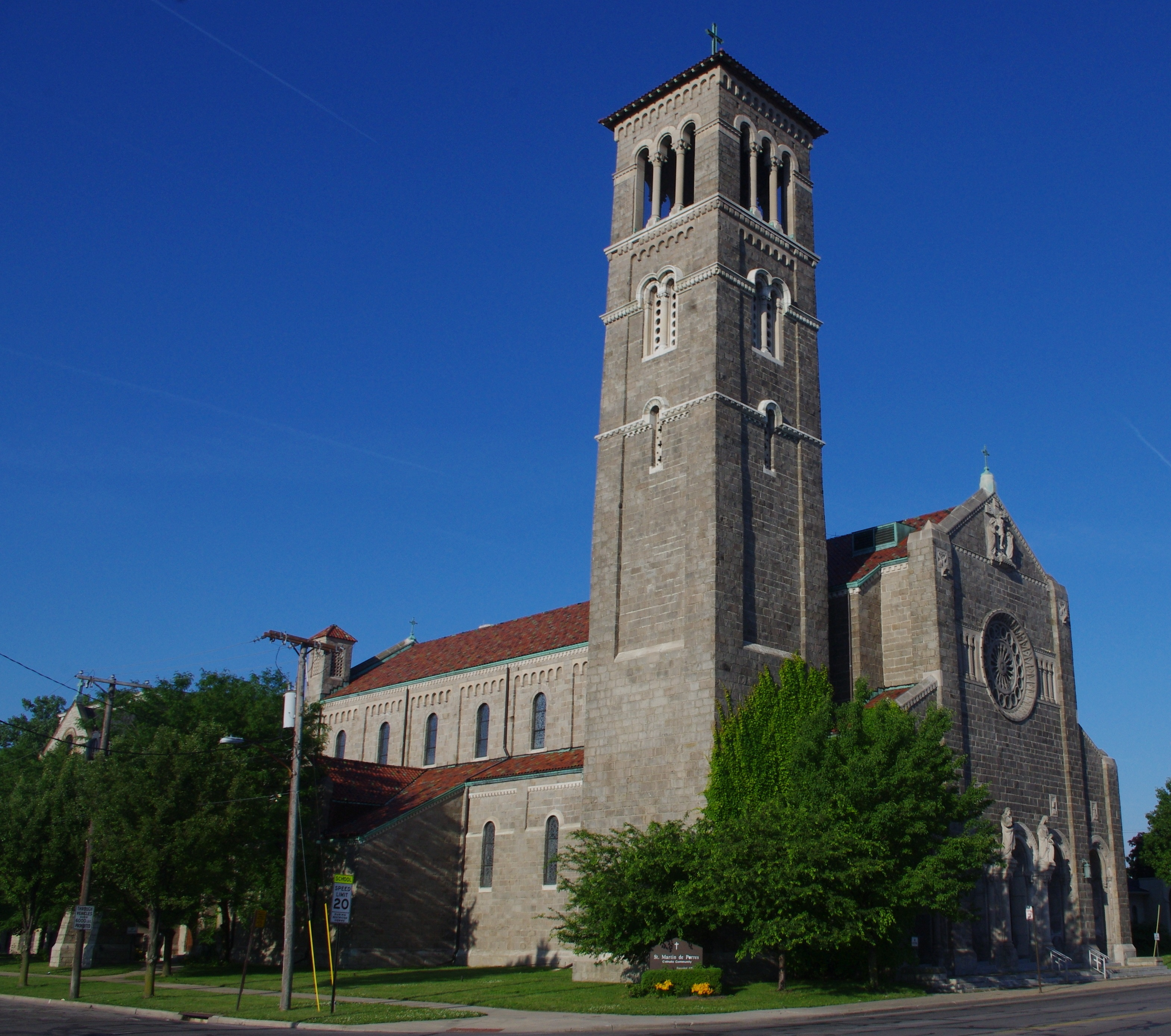
- Eastern side

- Location within Ohio Location within the United States
- Location: 1105 W. Bancroft and 1120 Horace Sts., Toledo, Ohio
- Area: less than one acre
- Architect: John T. Comes, Thomas Huber
- Architectural style: Romanesque, Italian Romanesque
- NRHP reference No.: 83002003
- Added to NRHP: May 5, 1983

St. Ann Roman Catholic Church Complex (now known as St Martin de Porres Catholic Church) is a historic Catholic church at 1105 W. Bancroft and 1120 Horace Streets in Toledo, Ohio. It was added to the National Register of Historic Places in 1983.

== Gallery ==
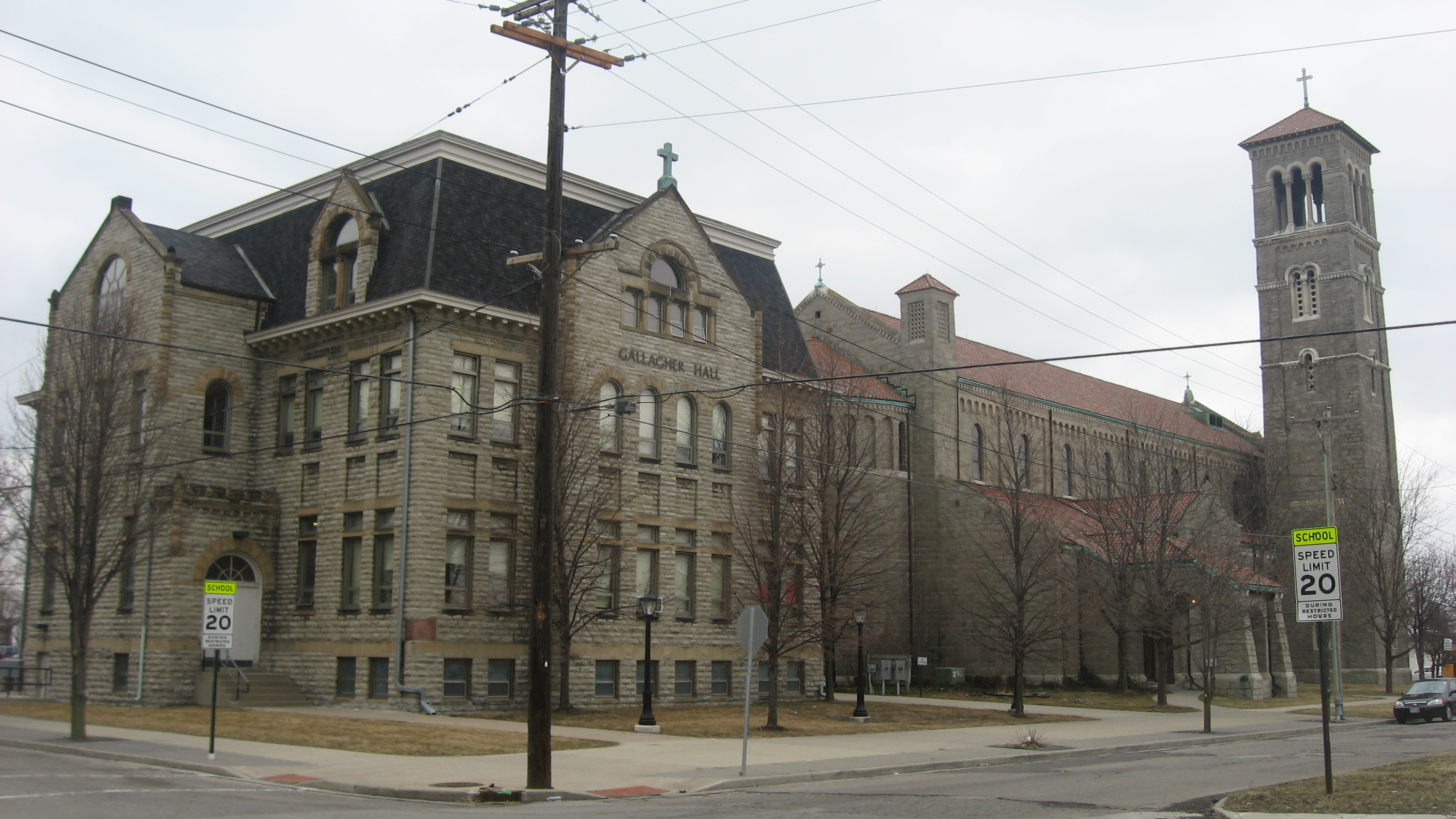

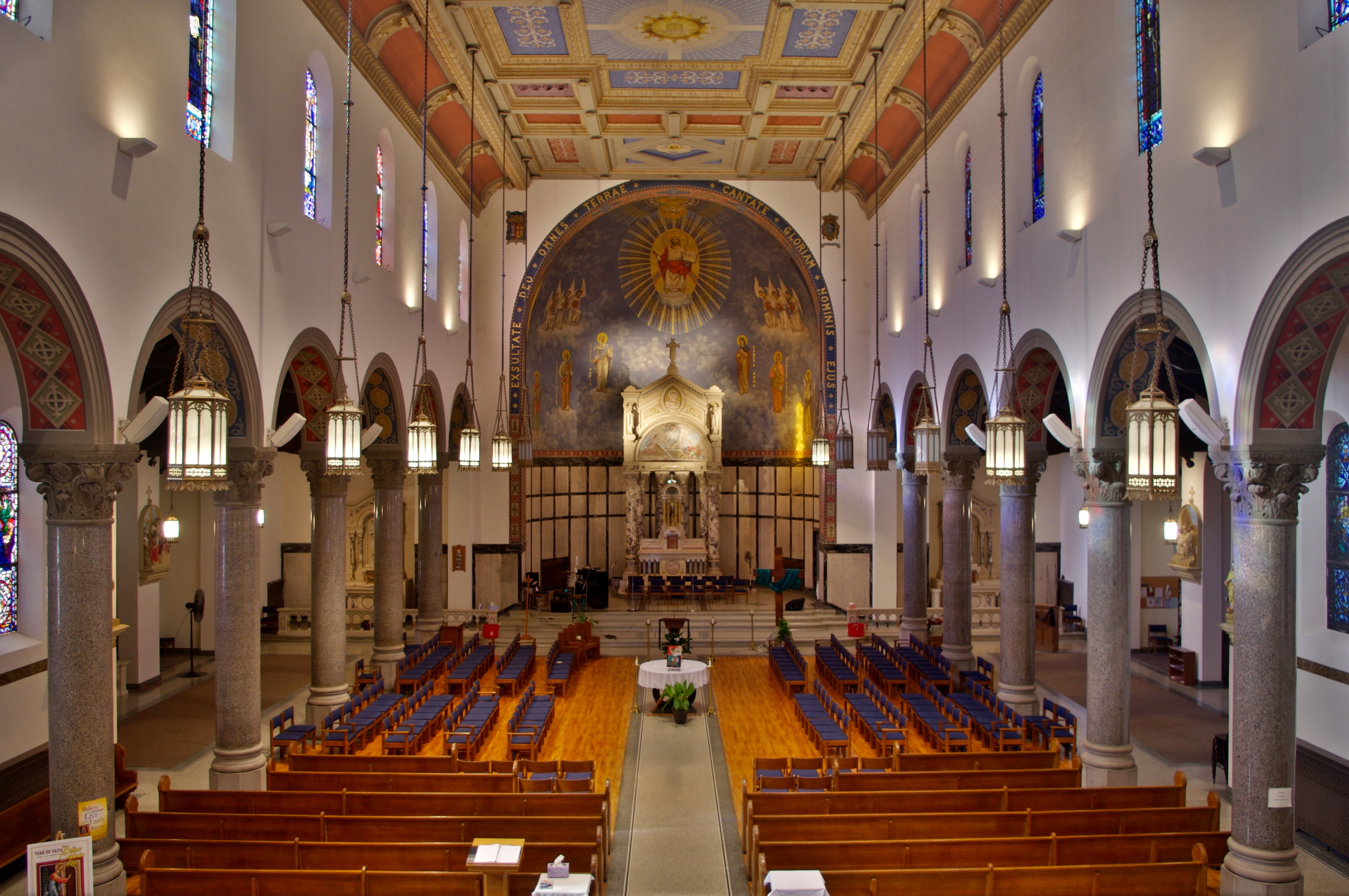

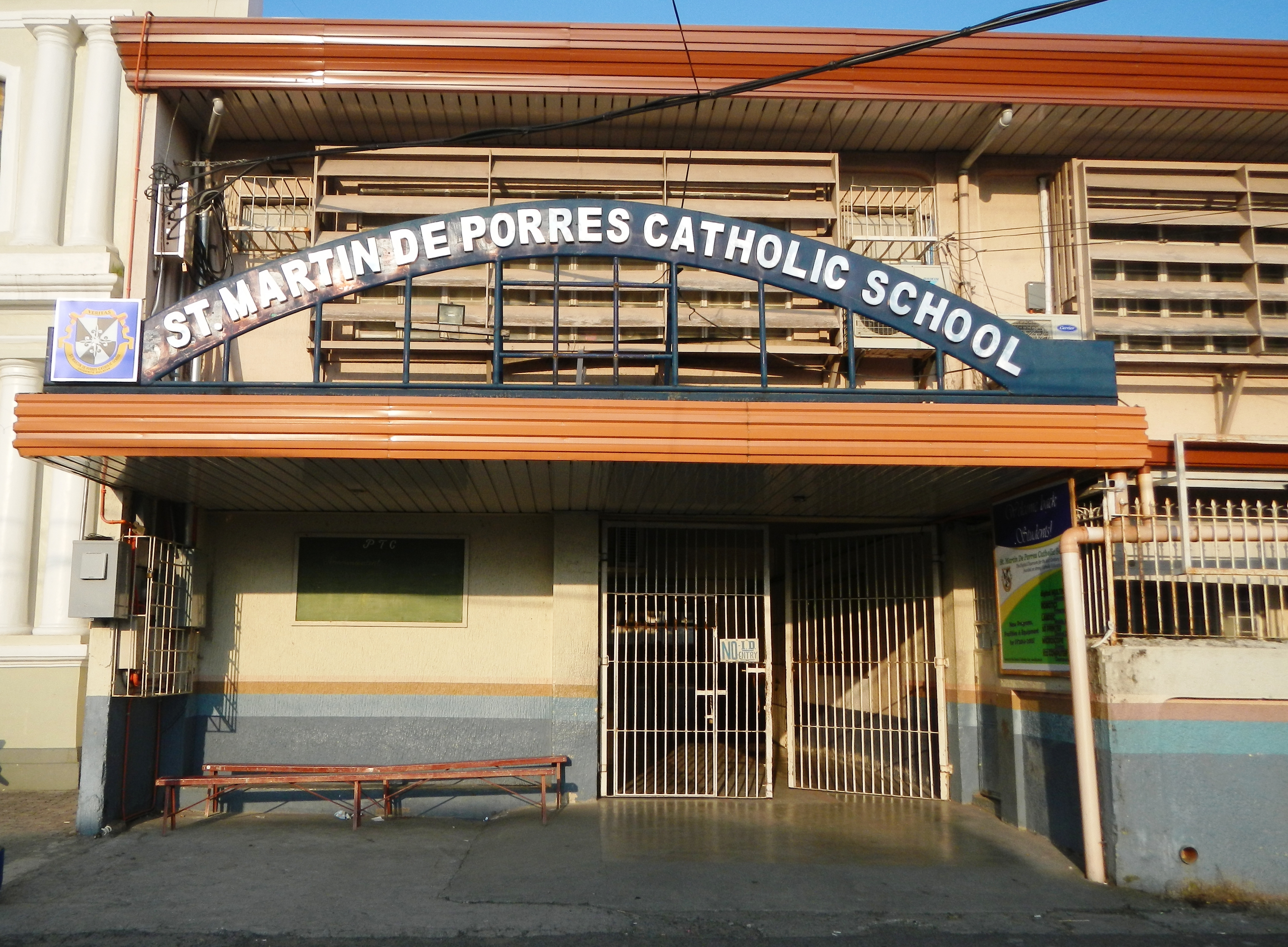

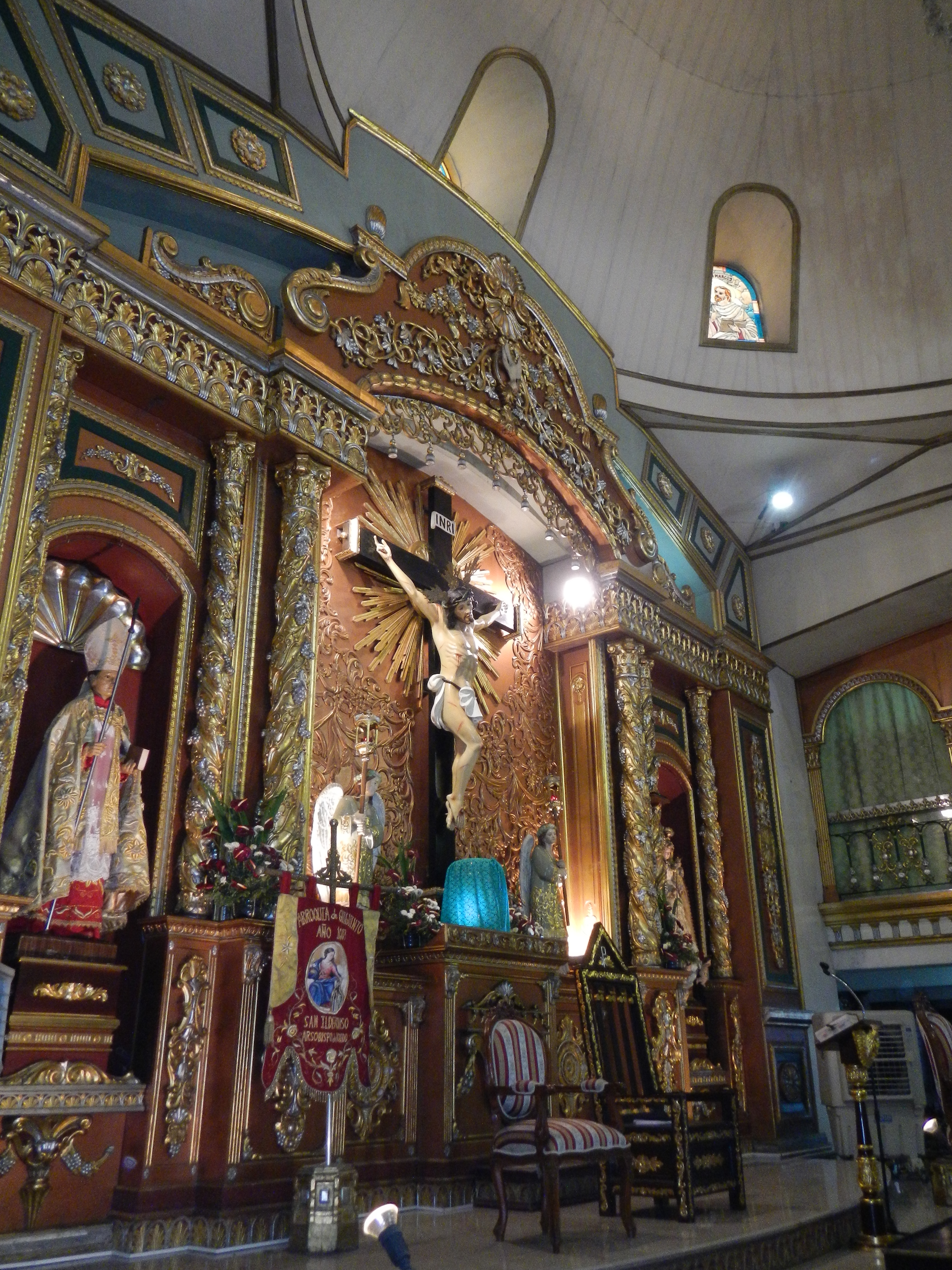
