= Church of St Anne, Royton =

Listed church in Greater Manchester, England

Church of St Anne
- St Anne, Longsight, Royton
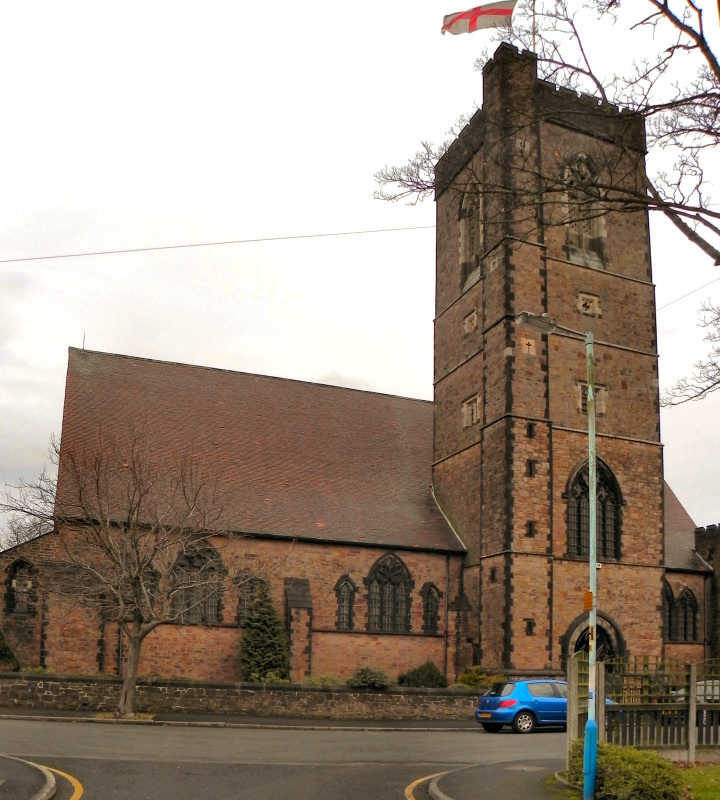
- The church in 2010

- Location in Greater Manchester
- 53.5600°N 2.1224°W
- OS grid reference: SD 91990 07049
- Address: St Anne's Avenue, Royton, Greater Manchester
- Country: England
- Denomination: Anglican
- Website: Church of St Anne

History
- Dedication: St Anne

Architecture
- Heritage designation: Grade II*
- Designated: 6 May 1987
- Architect: Temple Moore
- Architectural type: Church
- Style: Free Gothic
- Years built: 1908–09; 1926–27 (tower)

Specifications
- Materials: Snecked stone, clay tile

Administration
- Archdiocese: Archdeaconry of Rochdale
- Diocese: Diocese of Manchester

Clergy
- Priest: Revd Elizabeth Devall

The Church of St Anne is an Anglican parish church on St Anne's Avenue in Royton, a town within the Metropolitan Borough of Oldham, Greater Manchester, England. It is an active church in the Diocese of Manchester and is recorded in the National Heritage List for England as a Grade II* listed building. The church was designed in the Free Gothic style by Temple Moore and built in 1908–09, forming part of his later ecclesiastical output and regarded as one of his most accomplished parish churches. The tower was added in 1926–27 by Moore's son-in-law, Leslie Moore, following the original designs.

== History ==
Plans for a new church to serve the growing population of Royton were developed in the early 20th century. The parish was founded in 1908, and the building followed shortly afterwards. The project was promoted by the Rev. J. T. Ormerod, then a young curate at the Church of St Paul in Royton, who helped secure support for a substantial new church.

The design was entrusted to the architect Temple Moore, one of the leading ecclesiastical architects of the period. Moore produced a distinctive passage‑aisled plan, a type he had developed in several of his later churches. Construction took place between 1908–09, and the completed building was noted for its sweeping nave roof, which extends down over the narrow aisles, limiting the size of the side windows and giving the church its characteristic external profile.

The church was in use by 1910, as evidenced by baptism and marriage registrations, though the exact date of its consecration is not recorded in the main reference sources.

Although Moore's design included a west tower, it was not completed at the time of the initial construction. The tower was added in 1926–27 by Moore's son-in-law, Leslie Moore, following his original intentions, giving the church its present west‑end silhouette.

On 6 May 1987, the Church of St Anne was designated a Grade II* listed building. The church has remained in continuous use since its completion and continues to serve the local community as part of the Diocese of Manchester.

== Architecture ==
The church is constructed in snecked stone with a clay‑tile roof. A single roof carries the nave, chancel and aisle passages beneath. A shallow transept for the organ on the north side is balanced by a tower to the south, and there is a lean-to baptistry and porches at the west end, with a flat‑roofed lady chapel at the east end.

The four‑bay nave and chancel have plain buttresses and one, three and one‑light windows with reticulated tracery. The chancel windows have been given additional decoration. The church also contains an organ chamber that is gabled and a five‑stage tower with a corner stair turret, string courses defining each stage, a four‑light window in the second stage, two‑light flat‑headed mullioned windows with hood moulds, and castellations.

The lady chapel, which externally presents the appearance of the chancel, has flat buttresses, mullioned clerestory windows in a 17th‑century‑style, a rose window, and a coped parapet, and is edged by vestries.

=== Interior ===
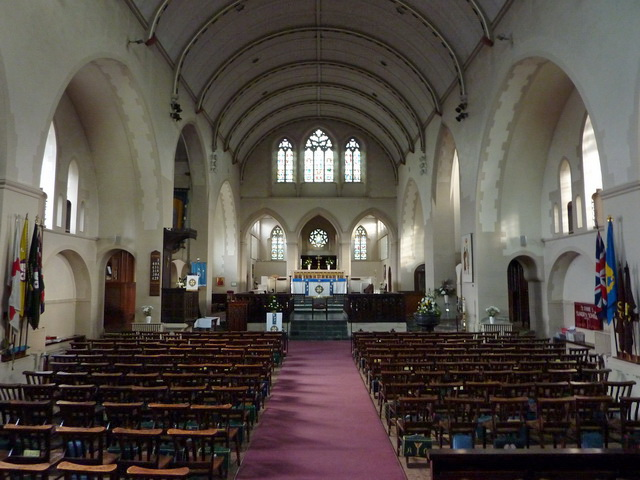
The interior in 2010

Internally, the church has dressings of ashlar sandstone and a ceiled, decoratively painted wagon roof. The nave's arcade arches are wide and rise from square columns, framing the aisle windows, which are positioned above seated recesses set beneath arches. The aisle passages beside the chancel continue to the east wall, where three arches are set; the outer arches opening into the lady chapel. The same arrangement appears at the west end, where the arches have been glazed and the former baptistry has been adapted as a narthex or meeting room.

The south‑east corner of the nave contains the stone font. A pulpit and two banks of choir stalls with carved front screens are among the surviving timber fittings. Moore also designed the painted reredos and the stained glass windows in the lady chapel.

== See also ==
- Grade II* listed buildings in Greater Manchester
- List of new churches by Temple Moore
- Listed buildings in Royton
