= St Anne's Church, Brown Edge =

Church in Staffordshire, England

Church of St Anne
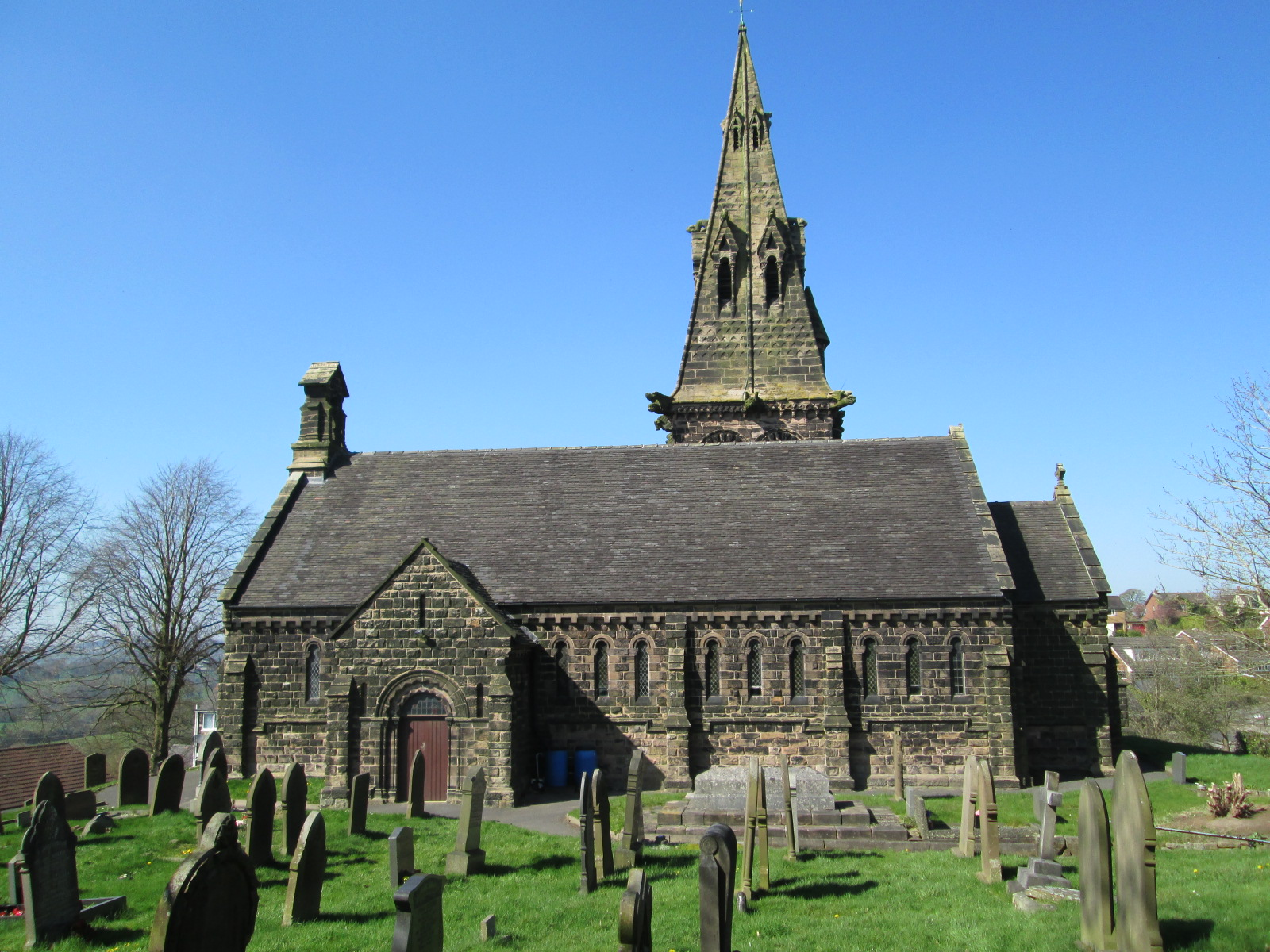
- Viewed from the south
- Church of St Anne
- 53°4′59.6″N 2°8′34.6″W
- OS grid reference: SJ 905 540
- Location: Brown Edge, Staffordshire
- Country: England
- Denomination: Church of England
- Website: www.brownedgestanne.org

History
- Dedication: Saint Anne

Architecture
- Heritage designation: Grade II
- Designated: 15 December 1986
- Architect(s): J. C. Trubshaw; Ward and Son
- Completed: 1854

Administration
- Diocese: Diocese of Lichfield

St Anne's Church is an Anglican church in Brown Edge, Staffordshire, England, and in the Diocese of Lichfield. The building is Grade II listed.

== History and description ==
In the early 19th century the inhabitants of Brown Edge were miners who worked at Chatterley Whitfield and other mines, a few miles away. The benefactors who gave land for the church, and contributed to its building, included the owners of these mines, notably the mine-owner Hugh Henshall Williamson (1785–1867).

The church, designed by J. C. Trubshaw, was built in 1844, using local stone. It was consecrated on 1 June 1844 by the Bishop of Lichfield, John Lonsdale.

The tower, with a spire, was built by Ward and Son in 1854. It is built against the north-east of the church, and is described in the listing text as "Iconoclastic Romanesque".

== See also ==
- Listed buildings in Brown Edge
