= St. Ann's Catholic Church of Badus =

Historic church in South Dakota, United States

- U.S. National Register of Historic Places
- Location within South Dakota Location within the United States
- Nearest city: Ramona, South Dakota
- Coordinates: 44°8′51″N 97°8′28″W
- Area: less than one acre
- Built: 1884
- Architectural style: Gothic
- NRHP reference No.: 79002403
- Added to NRHP: August 7, 1979

St. Ann's Catholic Church of Badus is a historic church in Ramona, South Dakota. It was built in 1884 and was added to the National Register in 1979.

== History ==
The area was settled by 10 Swiss immigrants who relocated to Lake Badus from Stillwater, Minnesota in 1877, naming the lake after a lake near Piz Badus. The community celebrated its first Mass and baptism on May 20, 1880, joined by Irish settlers from elsewhere in Nunda Township. Plans to build a permanent church began in 1883, and were realized in 1884.

The routing of the Milwaukee Road through Ramona led to faster growth there; St. William of Vercelli there was split off as its own parish in 1898. St. Ann's was closed for regular services in 1965, although it remains in use as a summer chapel and for a special celebration on the Feast of St. Ann in July.

== Architecture ==
It is a one-story vernacular-Gothic Revival building with a gable roof and clapboard siding. It is west-facing with four bays on its north and south sides, and it has Gothic-style tracery within pointed arches of its windows.
