= St Anne's Chapel, Dwejra =

St Anne's Chapel
- Kappella ta' Sant'Anna
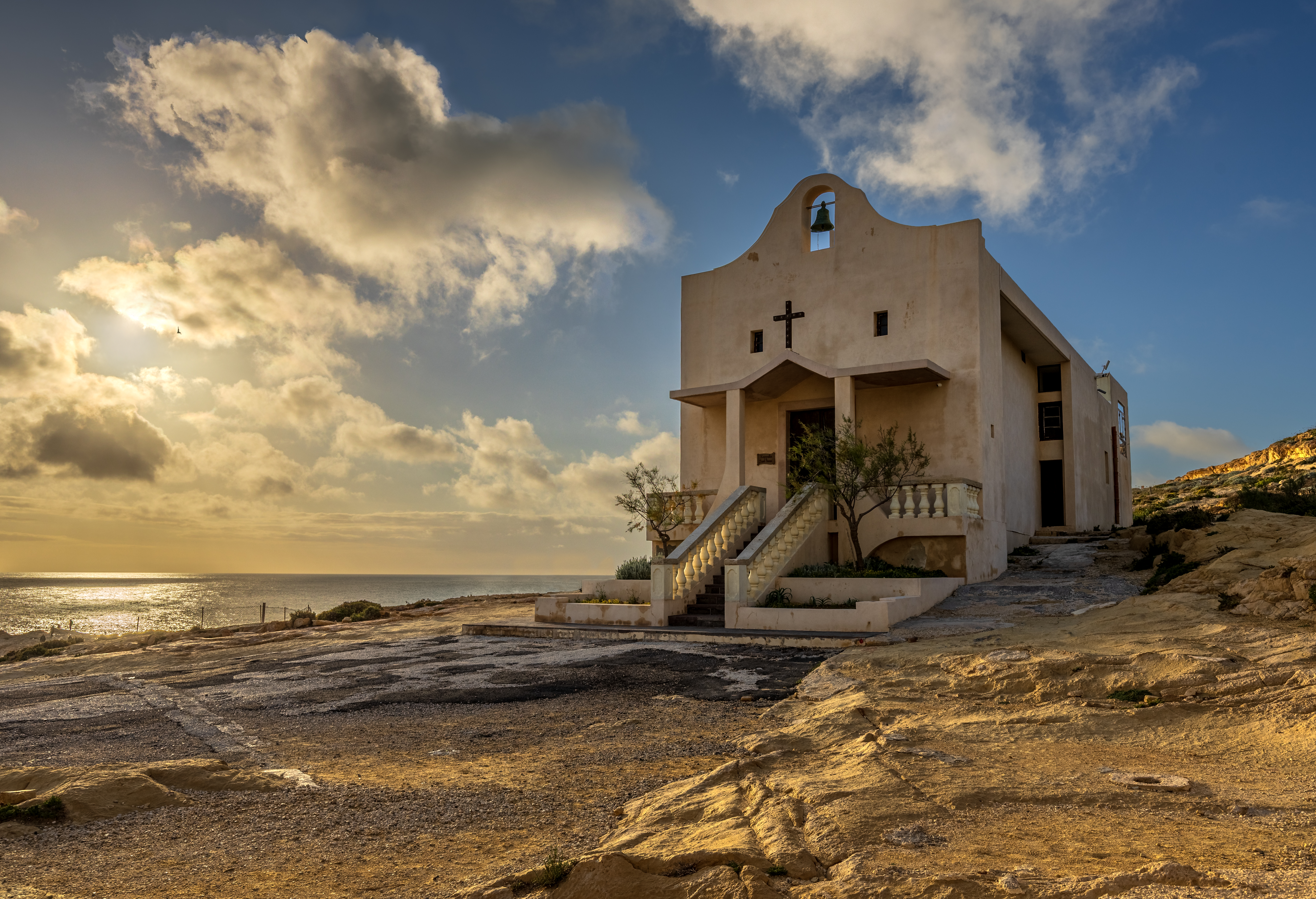
- Chapel at Dwejra
- Click on the map for a fullscreen view
- 36°3′10.1981″N 14°11′24.0000″E
- Location: Triq Wied Merill, San Lawrenz, Gozo
- Country: Malta
- Language: Maltese
- Denomination: Catholic
- Tradition: Roman Rite

History
- Status: Chapel
- Founded: 25 July 1963
- Founder: Alwiġ Mizzi
- Dedication: Anne
- Consecrated: 25 July 1963

Architecture
- Completed: 1963

Administration
- Diocese: Gozo

St. Anne's Chapel (Maltese: Kappella ta' Sant'Anna) is a Roman Catholic chapel at Dwejra in the village of San Lawrenz, Gozo in Malta. It is the closest building to the former site of the Azure Window.

== History ==
The chapel was built in a few months on the site of an older chapel through funds raised by Rev. Alwiġ Mizzi, a Salesian friar who was a great devotee of Saint Anne. It was designed by local architect Joseph Mizzi, and the master builder was Wenzu Formosa, a former sacristan of the parish church of San Lawrenz.

The inauguration took place on 25 July 1963 and the chapel was consecrated by Gozo Bishop Giuseppe Pace.

== Architectural structure ==
The building is located at the end of Wied Merill Street on the Dwejra cliffs, very close where the Azure Window stood until 2017. Other points of interest close to the chappel are the Inland Sea, Fungus Rock, and the Dwejra Tower.

Outside its facade is a two-tiered parapet, covered with soil and succulent plants. This is divided by a staircase leading to the main door. The stairs have stone railings on each side, placed on balustrades. Covering the small parapet in front of the main door is an angular concrete canopy resting on two simple columns.

The facade and the rest of the building are quite simple. Above the door are two small rectangular windows and a small bell tower with an arch above it, and a bronze bell. On the right side of the door is a rustic ceramic sign with the Maltese words Kappella Sant'Anna.

The structure of the chapel consists of a simple rectangular room with a flat roof articulated onto its walls. At the back of the chapel is a room that serves as a sacristy, which is also accessible through a side door. The main altar dominates the chapel from the inside, along with a stone statue of Saint Anne by the Gozitan sculptor Michael Camilleri Cauchi.

In the early 2020s, three religious scenes from the life of Saint Anne and the death and resurrection of Jesus Christ were created in mosaic by the Eikon center led by Rev. Roberto Gauci to decorate the interior of this otherwise plain chapel.

== Administration ==
The chapel is administered by the parish of San Lawrenz. A liturgical mass is held once a week, on Sundays at 4pm (in autumn and winter) or 5pm (spring and summer).
