= Gesù Cristo Redentore, Alcamo =

Church building in Alcamo, Italy

Gesù Cristo Redentore
- Chiesa di Gesù Cristo Redentore
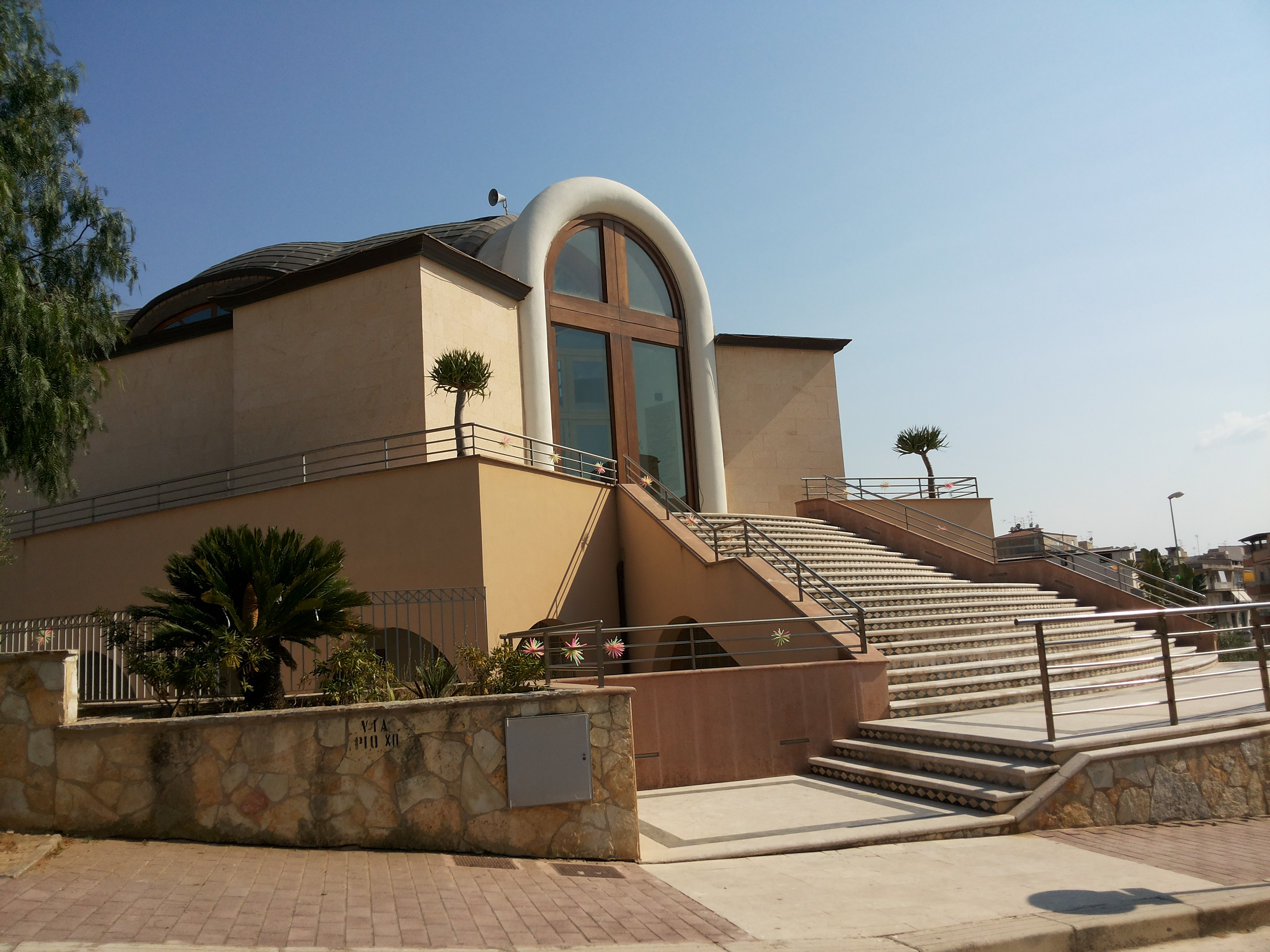
- The façade

Religion
- Affiliation: Catholic
- Province: province of Trapani
- Region: Sicily
- Rite: Catholic
- Patron: Gesù Cristo Redentore
- Year consecrated: 2008

Location
- Location: Alcamo, province of Trapani, Italy
- Municipality: Alcamo
- State: Italy
- Interactive map of Gesù Cristo Redentore
- Territory: Alcamo
- Coordinates: 37°58′12″N 12°57′09″E

Architecture
- Architect: Vincenzo Calvaruso
- Type: modern
- Funded by: Don Benedetto Cottone
- Groundbreaking: 2002

Gesù Cristo Redentore ("Jesus Christ the Redeemer") is a Catholic church in Alcamo, in the province of Trapani, Italy.

== Description ==
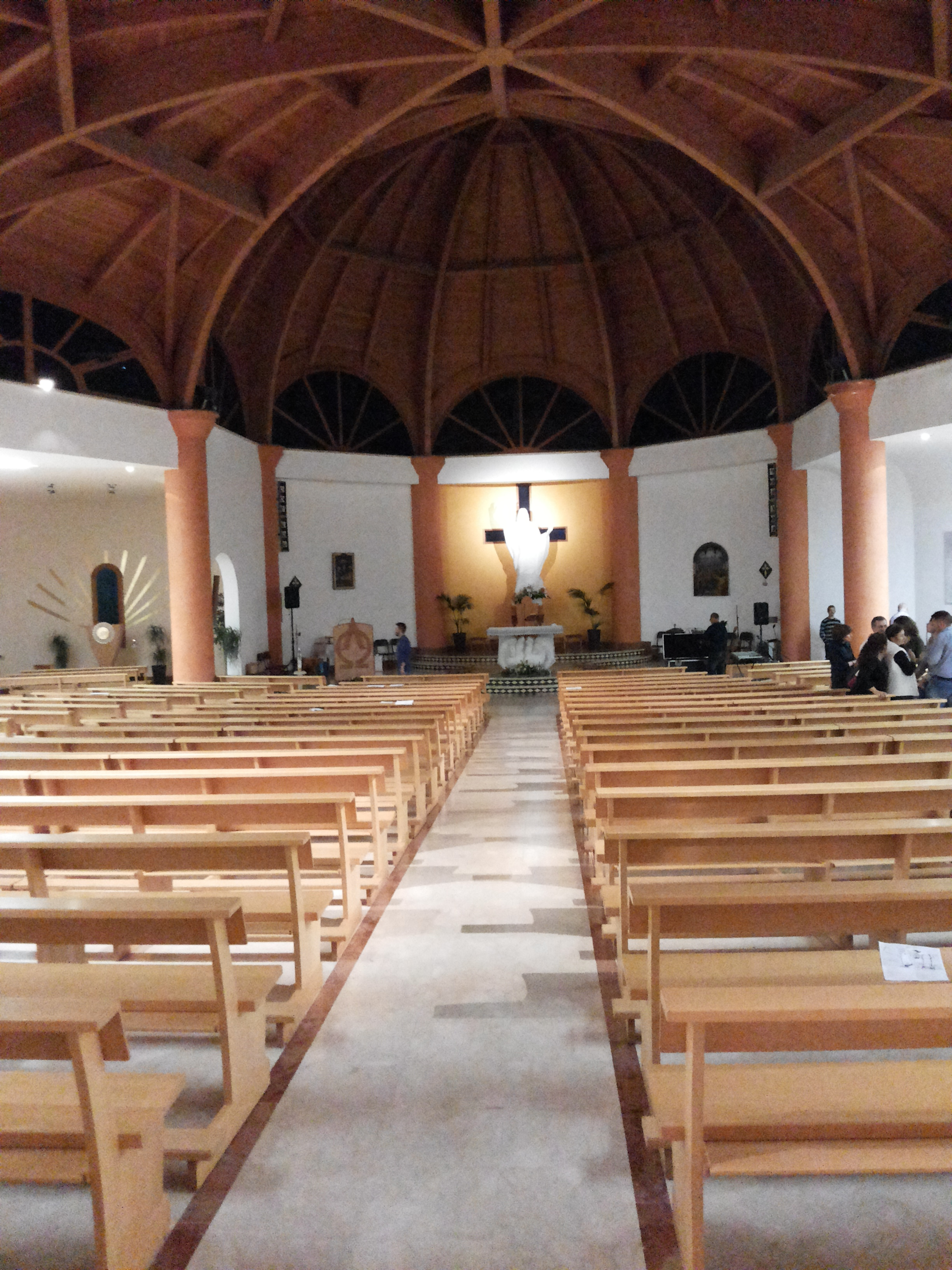
The interior of the church

In the planning of the overall parish "Gesù Cristo Redentore", they have followed the guidelines recommended by the Conferenza Episcopale Italiana (Italian Episcopal Conference) in 1993.

The church, in a central position in the district of "Sant’Anna" (in the area of Via Kennedy), is an example of how the use of glued laminated timber allows linking functionality and beauty; it is larger than 600 square metres and, in accordance with the regulations on the removing of architectural barriers, it has a sloping floor towards the Presbytery (architecture), with a declivity which allows optimal participation to the believers during the liturgical functions.

It is made up of the Presbytery, located in the apse, with a step higher than the hall, the Ambon and the sacramental area, with a wooden dome (in glued laminated timber) above it; the floor here is realized with polychrome marbles and so believers can differentiate the meaning of the different liturgical functions; a central nave, corresponding with the hall, and with about 600 seats, and two aisles for the coming in and out of people, and for the processional route during the functions; the parvis which permits the outdoor celebrations with great participation of believers, thanks to its position on the top of the staircases.

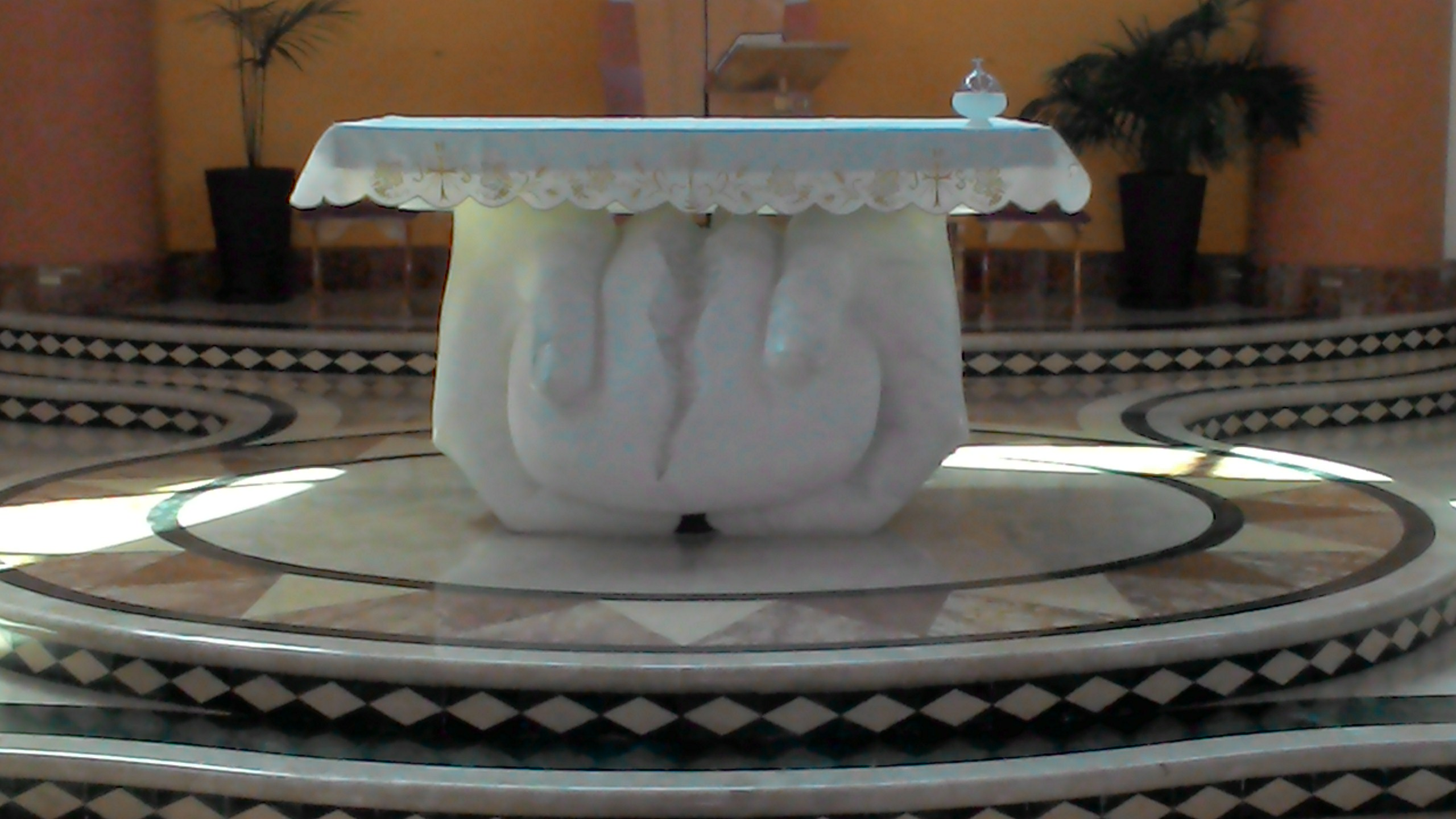
The Altar, made by Massimiliano Apicella
