= Saint Anne Church (Waterbury, Connecticut) =

The Shrine of Saint Anne
- All Saints/Todos Los Santos Parish
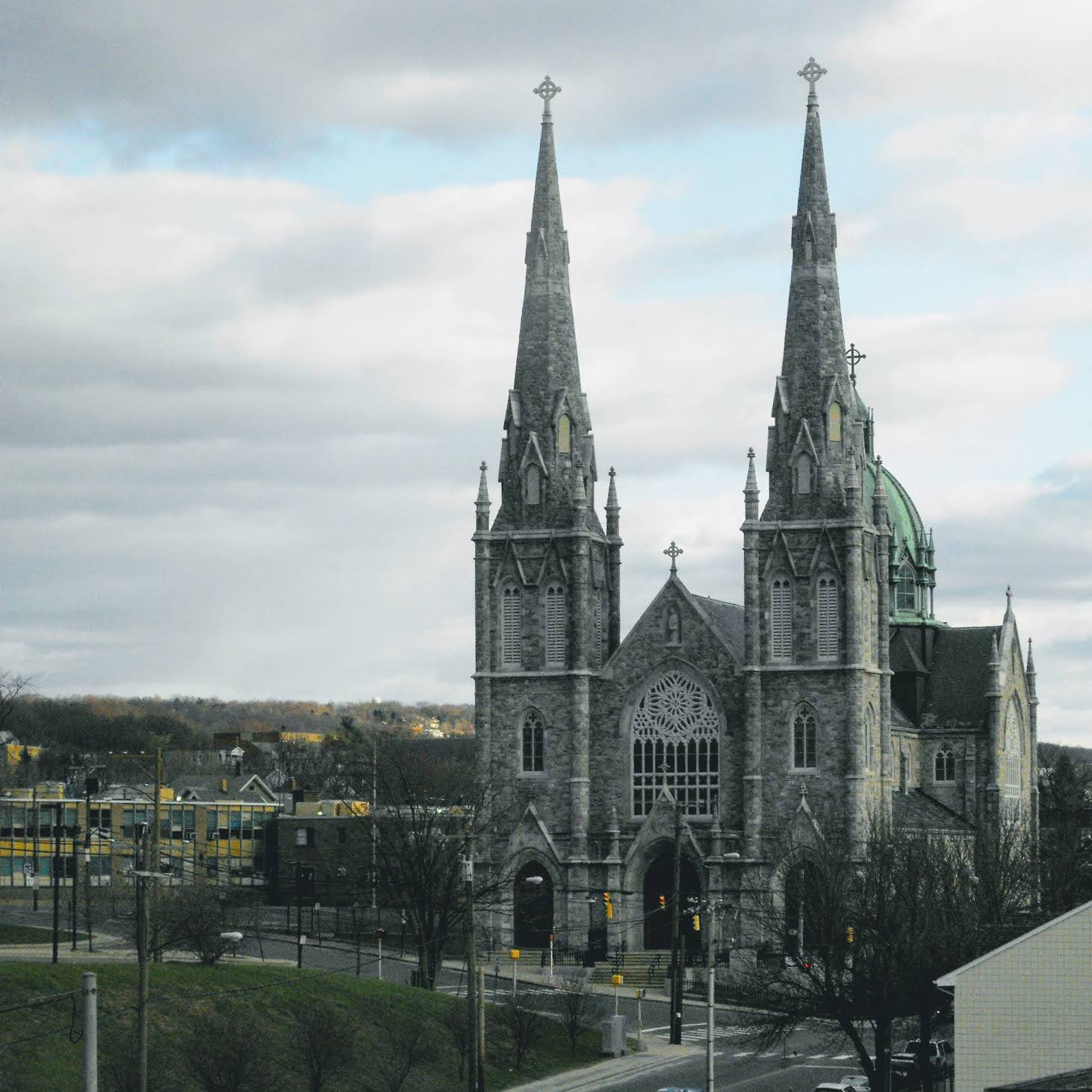
- Saint Anne in 2009; steeples dismantled in 2019
- The Shrine of Saint Anne
- 41°32′58″N 73°02′25″W
- Location: 515 South Main Street; Waterbury, CT
- Country: United States
- Denomination: Roman Catholic
- Website: https://allsaintswtby.org/

History
- Founded: 1886
- Dedicated: 1922 (current church)

Administration
- Archdiocese: Hartford
- Parish: All Saints Parish/ Todos Los Santos

Clergy
- Archbishop: Most Rev. Christopher J. Coyne
- Rector: Rev. Diego Jimenez
- Vicar: Rev. Eric M. Zuniga

Our Lady of Lourdes Church
- All Saints/Todos Los Santos Parish
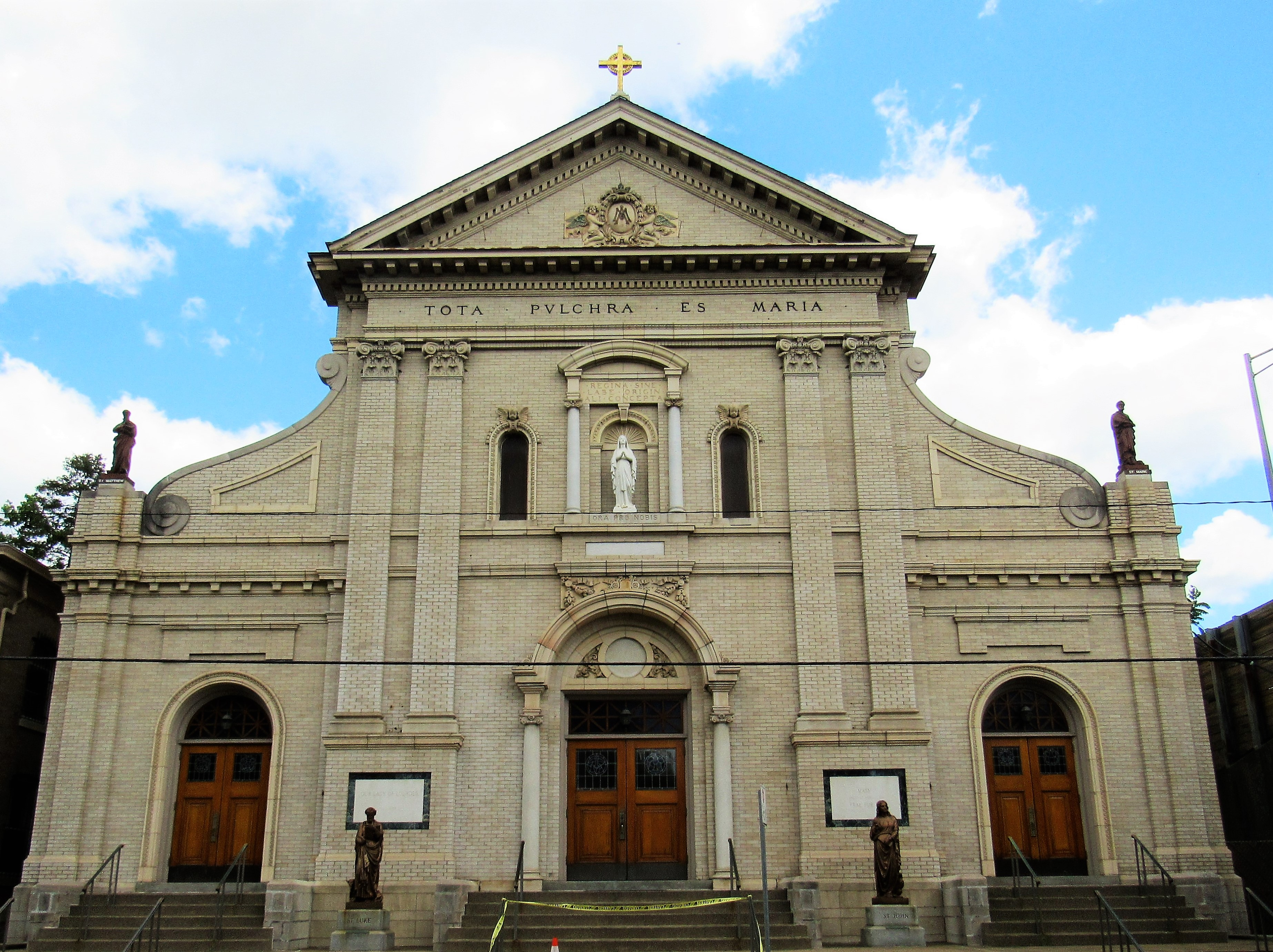
- Our Lady of Lourdes in 2019
- Our Lady of Lourdes Church
- 41°33′05″N 73°02′29″W
- Location: 309 South Main Street; Waterbury, CT
- Country: United States
- Denomination: Roman Catholic

History
- Founded: 1899
- Dedicated: 1909 (current church)

Administration
- Archdiocese: Hartford
- Parish: All Saints Parish/Todos Los Santos

Clergy
- Archbishop: Christopher J. Coyne

Saint Anne Church, formally the Shrine of Saint Anne for Mothers, is a Roman Catholic church located in the South End neighborhood of Waterbury, Connecticut, part of All Saints Parish (Spanish: Todos Los Santos). Saint Anne Parish was founded in 1886 to serve city's the French-Catholic population. For nearly 100 years, two 100 foot steeples served as a prominent Waterbury landmark; however, due to ongoing structural problems, the spires were carefully removed in 2019 and stored for possible reconstruction.

In 2017, Archbishop Leonard Blair merged several other parishes into Saint Anne's, renaming the consolidated parish as All Saints. Nearby Our Lady of Lourdes church, erected as a in independent parish in 1899, and consolidated into All Saints/Todos Los Santos in 2017, is the parish's second worship site. In 2023, another Church, St. Francis Xavier, joined the parish.

== History ==
=== Saint Anne ===
The French Catholic community of Waterbury first met at the old Universalist Trinity chapel on Grand Street. In April 1886 Bishop Lawrence S. McMahon, appointed Father Joseph W. Fones of Watertown to organize a parish. About two weeks later Father Fones first celebrated Mass at the Grand Street hall for the French congregation. Mostly French Canadian immigrants from Quebec, they chose St. Anne as the patroness of the parish. The parish's first church was built in 1888–1889 on Dover Street and dedicated on January 27, 1889.

By 1895, Father Joseph E. Bourret replaced the original school opened in September 1890 in the church basement with a red brick school on Dover Street. It was staffed by the Sisters of the Congregation of Notre Dame. After 102 years of service, the parish school closed its doors in 1992.

Construction of a larger church building on South Main Street began in 1906. By 1910 the basement was completed and the parish began to use it for services. completion was delayed for a time to accumulate the necessary funds and also due to the First World War. According to Ruth Glasser, curator of the "In the Shadow of St. Anne's" exhibit at the Mattatuck Museum, "This church was literally built on the nickels and dimes of its congregation." The finished church was dedicated on December 17, 1922, dedicated by Bishop John J. Nilan, of the Diocese of Hartford.

In 2005, it became a shrine for mothers and began displaying relics attributed to Saint Anne, mother of the Virgin Mary.

=== 2017 Consolidation ===
In 2017, the Roman Catholic Archdiocese of Hartford implemented a major restructuring of parishes within its boundaries, including the consolidation of many parishes and the closure of 26 church buildings. In Waterbury six churches were merged to form All Saints Parish. Four of the buildings were closed for regularly scheduled worship as a result, the most of any single city within the archdiocese. Four more parishes in the city were consolidated into two new parishes, however the buildings remained open for worship, in addition to the merger of St. Francis Xavier in 2023

Original Parishes of All Saints/Todos Los Santos Parish

Parish Name	Founded	Current Building	Original Population	Location	Status
Saint Anne	1886	1922	French	515 South Main Street	Open^{1}
Our Lady of Lourdes	1899	1909	Italian	309 South Main Street	Open^{1}
Saint Francis Xavier	1896	1902	Territorial	625 Baldwin Street	Open^{1}
Saint Lucy	1926	1964	Italian	24 Branch Street	Closed in 2017-May be Sold to City of Waterbury
Sacred Heart (Spanish: Sagrado Corazon)	1885	1889	Territorial	13 Wolcott Street	Closed in 2017
Saint Margaret	1910	1957	Territorial	289 Willow Street	Closed in 2017 - Sold to Brass City Charter School
Saint Stanislaus Kostka	1910	1914-26	Polish	100 East Farm Street	Closed in 2017 - Sold to Shekinah Christian Church

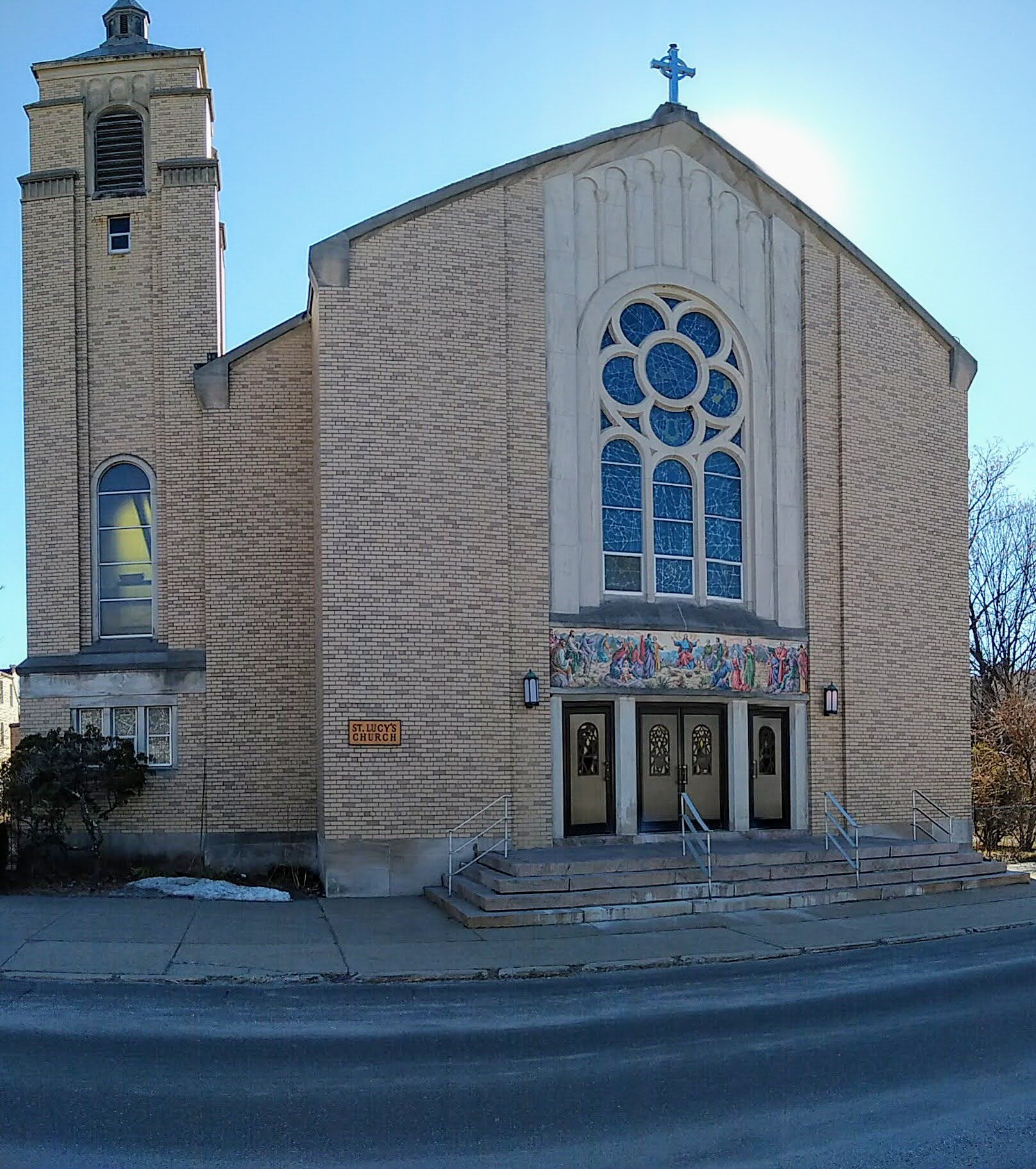
Former Saint Lucy Church

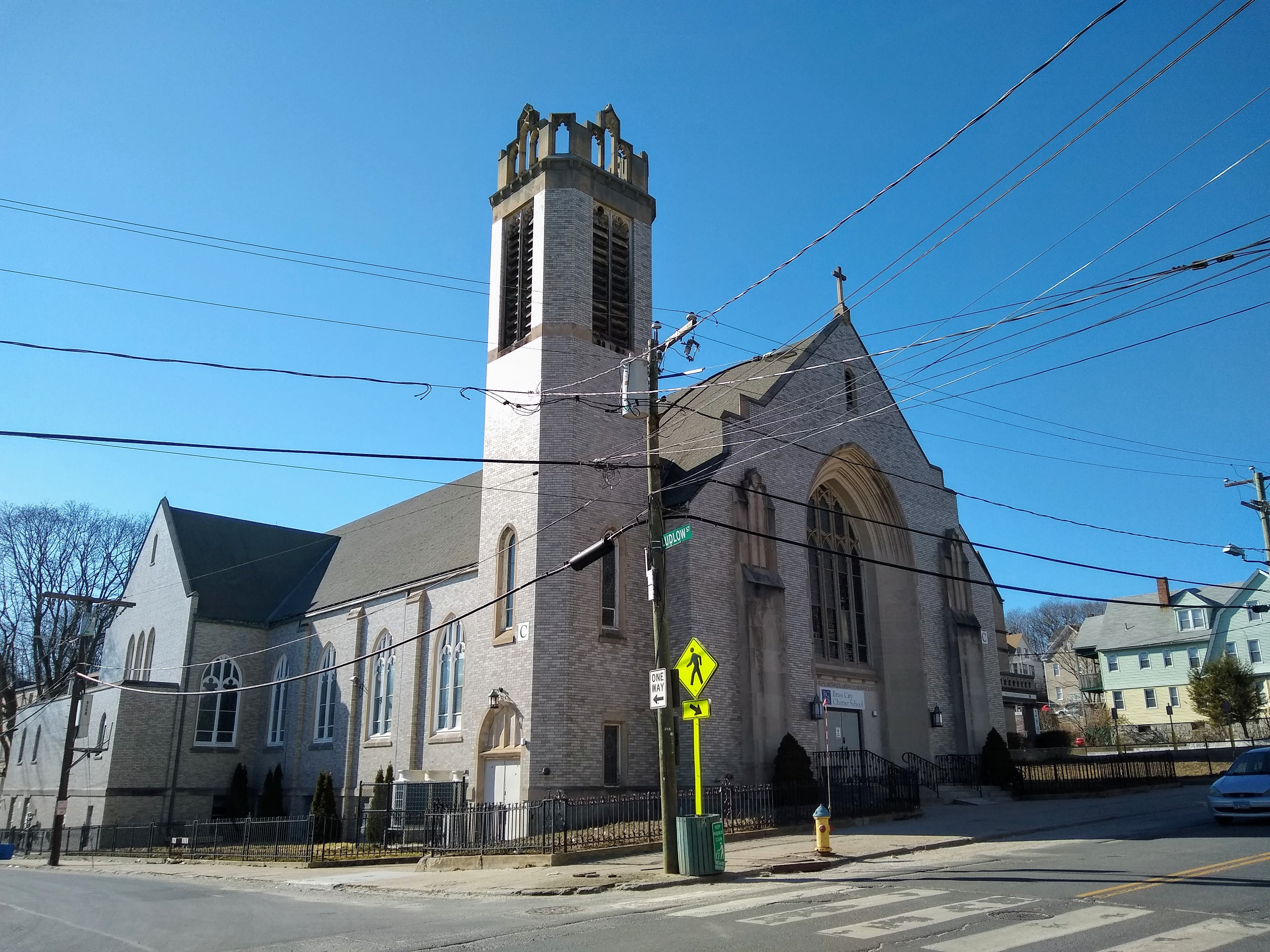
Former Saint Margaret Church

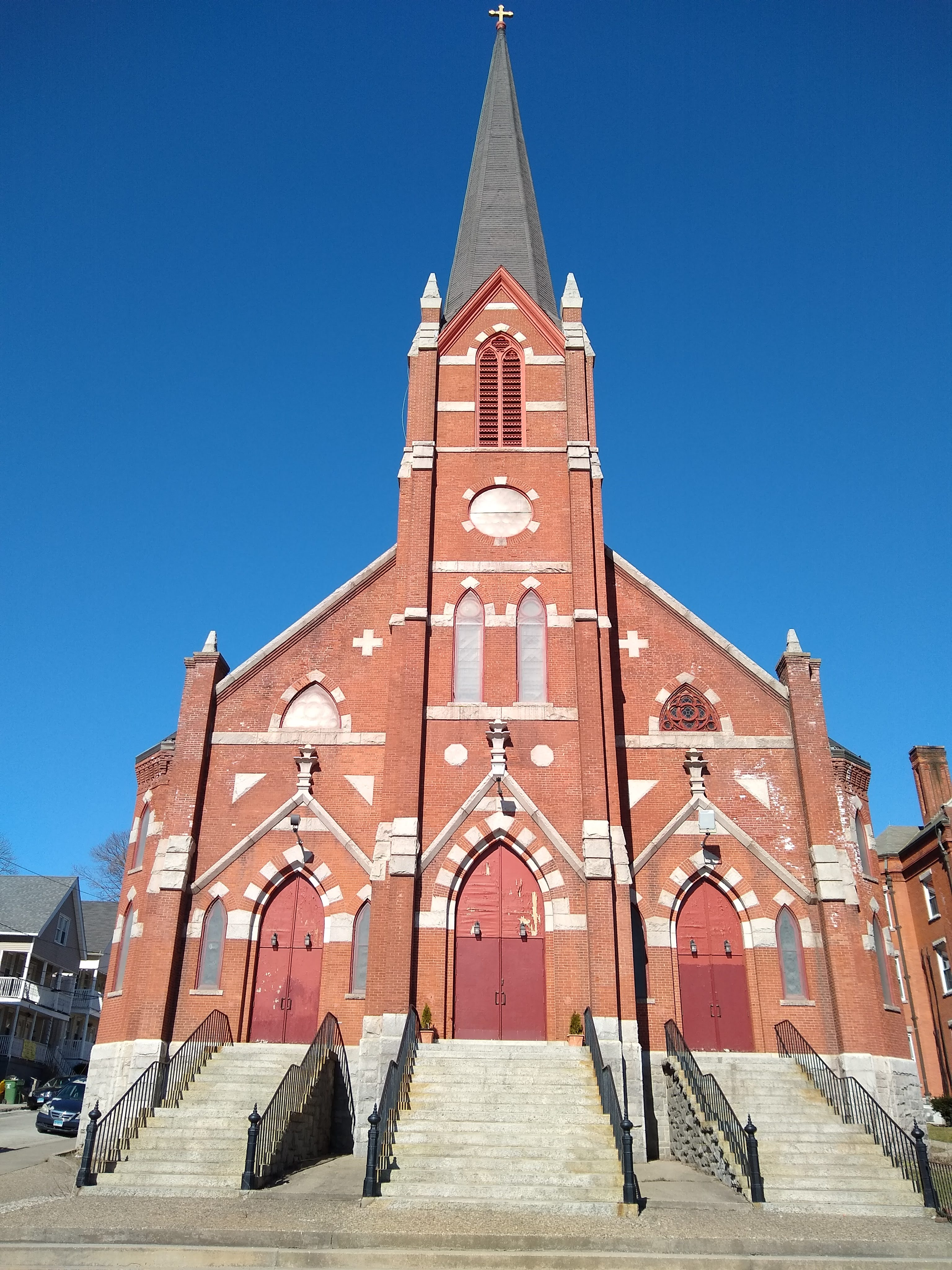
Former Sacred Heart Church

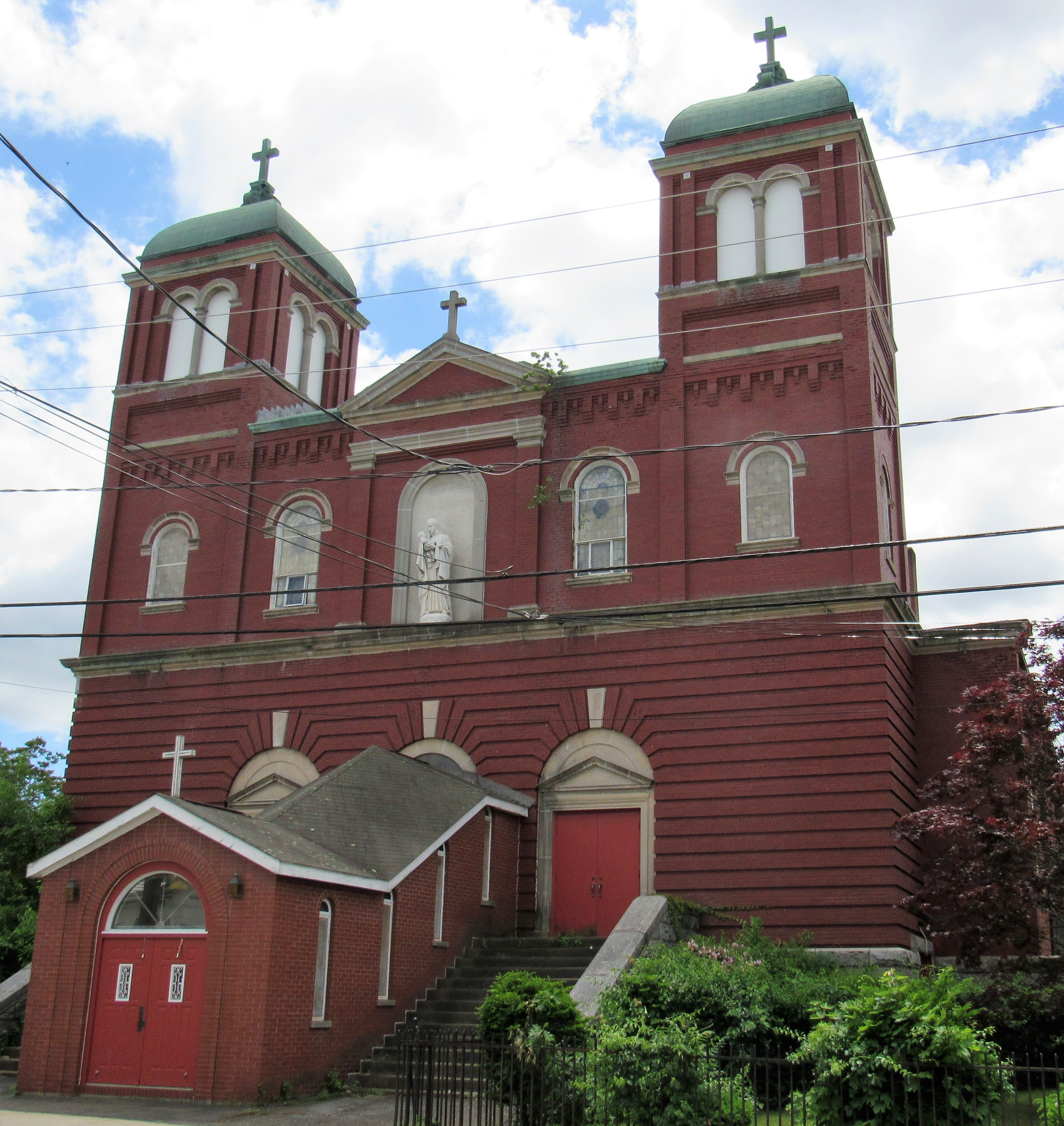
Former Saint Stanislaus Kostka

== Architecture - Saint Anne Church ==
Designed by Boston architects Chickering & O'Connell in French Gothic revival style. It was built by the Granite Construction Company of Fall River, Massachusetts. The structure is steel, overlaid with brick and faced in stone. The base is granite, with the stone above Vermont blue marble. The church has a rose window over the entrance and a copper-topped dome above the altar. For nearly 100 years, two 100 foot steeples served as a prominent Waterbury landmark, however, due to ongoing structural problems, the spires were removed in 2019.

=== Interior ===
The interior was significantly damaged by smoke and fire in 1971 and again 1978, resulting in the original paint and decorative artwork being painted over. During a restoration in the 2010s, evidence of the original stenciling and other features were uncovered, informing the new interior artwork installed. Master restorer John Canning noted that the church has a very sophisticated feminine scheme, befitting the patron of the church.

=== Steeples ===
The church originally had two marble-clad steeples each roughly 100 feet high, with a brick interior structure. Since at least the 1980s, efforts to waterproof and maintain the steeples have been on-going, including the installation of a fiberglass shell to reinforce the brick. In 2018, several marble blocks fell from the spires onto the public sidewalk, prompting the emergency closure of the church for several months, and the installation of protective netting. Engineer's reports indicated severe structural issues, and a highly complex process to rebuild the interior structure while keeping the spires standing in place. All Saints parish made the decision that it was more cost effective to dismantle the towers to address the immediate safety concerns, with a goal to raise funds to rebuild the spires with as much of the original stone as possible. Both original crosses at the top of the spires were also preserved. The spires were dismantled starting in July 2019, with each exterior stone carefully numbered and cataloged. Dismantalling the towers cost about $900 Thousand, while rebuilding is estimated to cost about $5 Million.

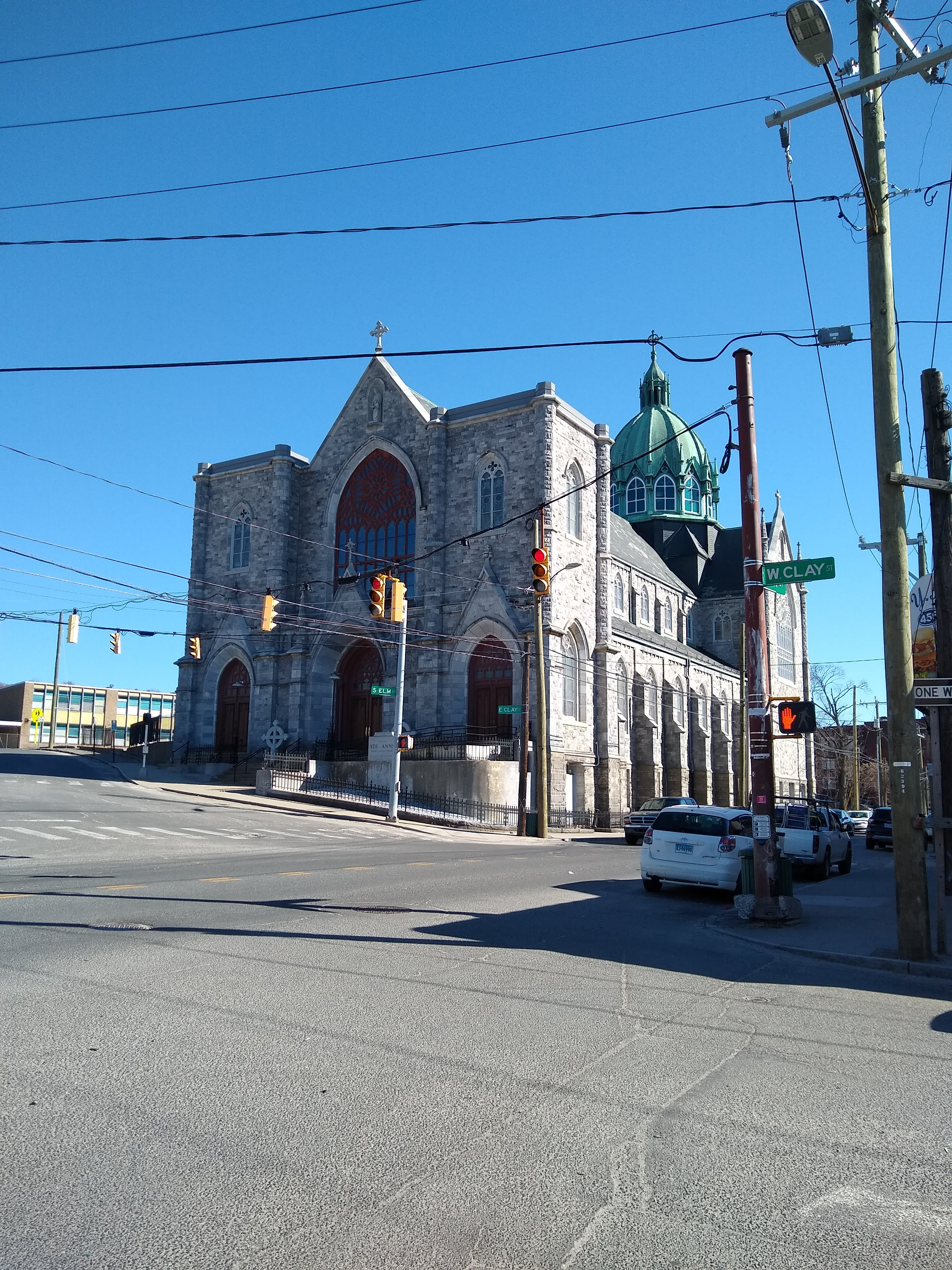
Saint Anne Church in 2021, after removal of steeples

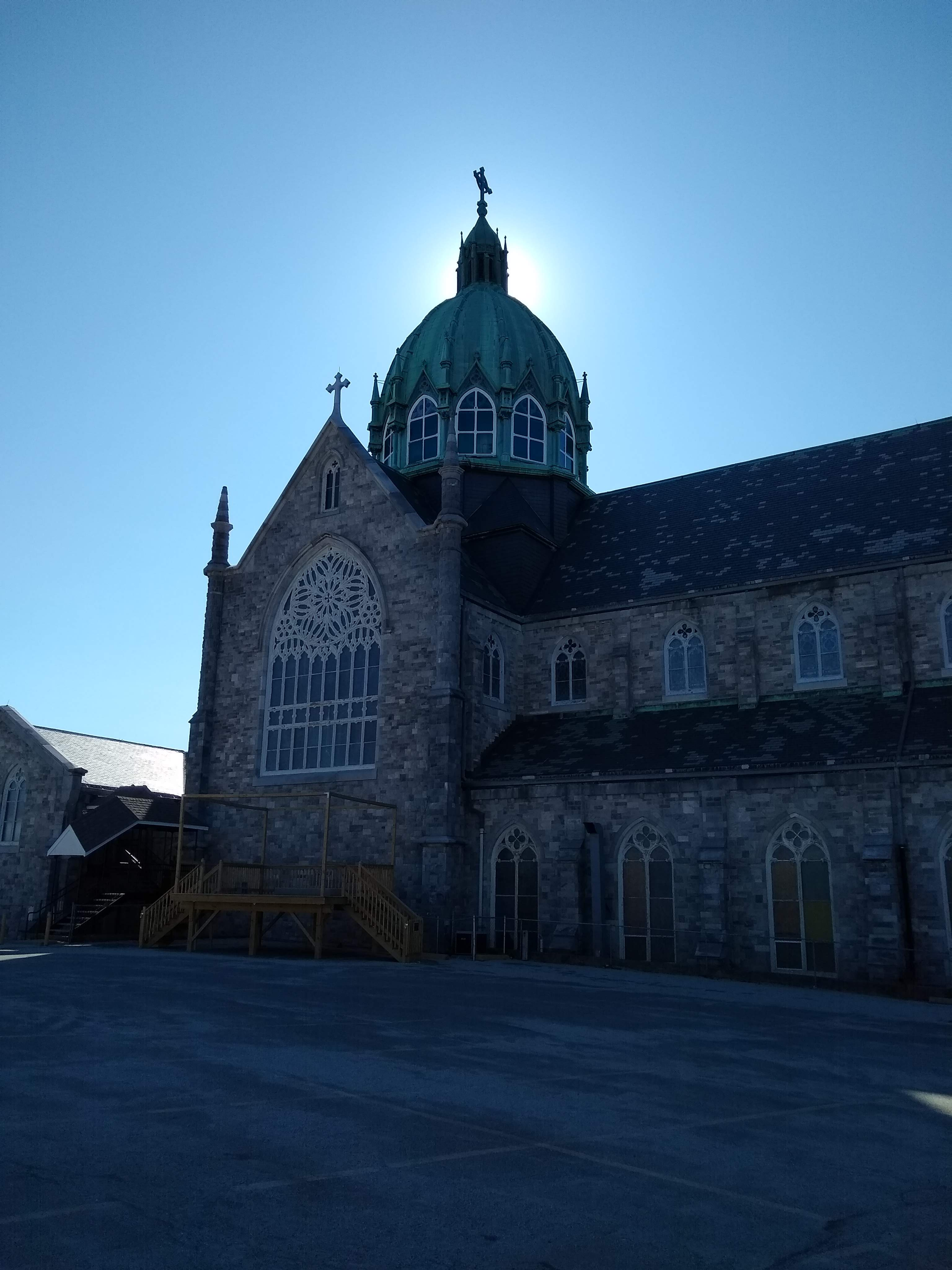
View of dome and east transept

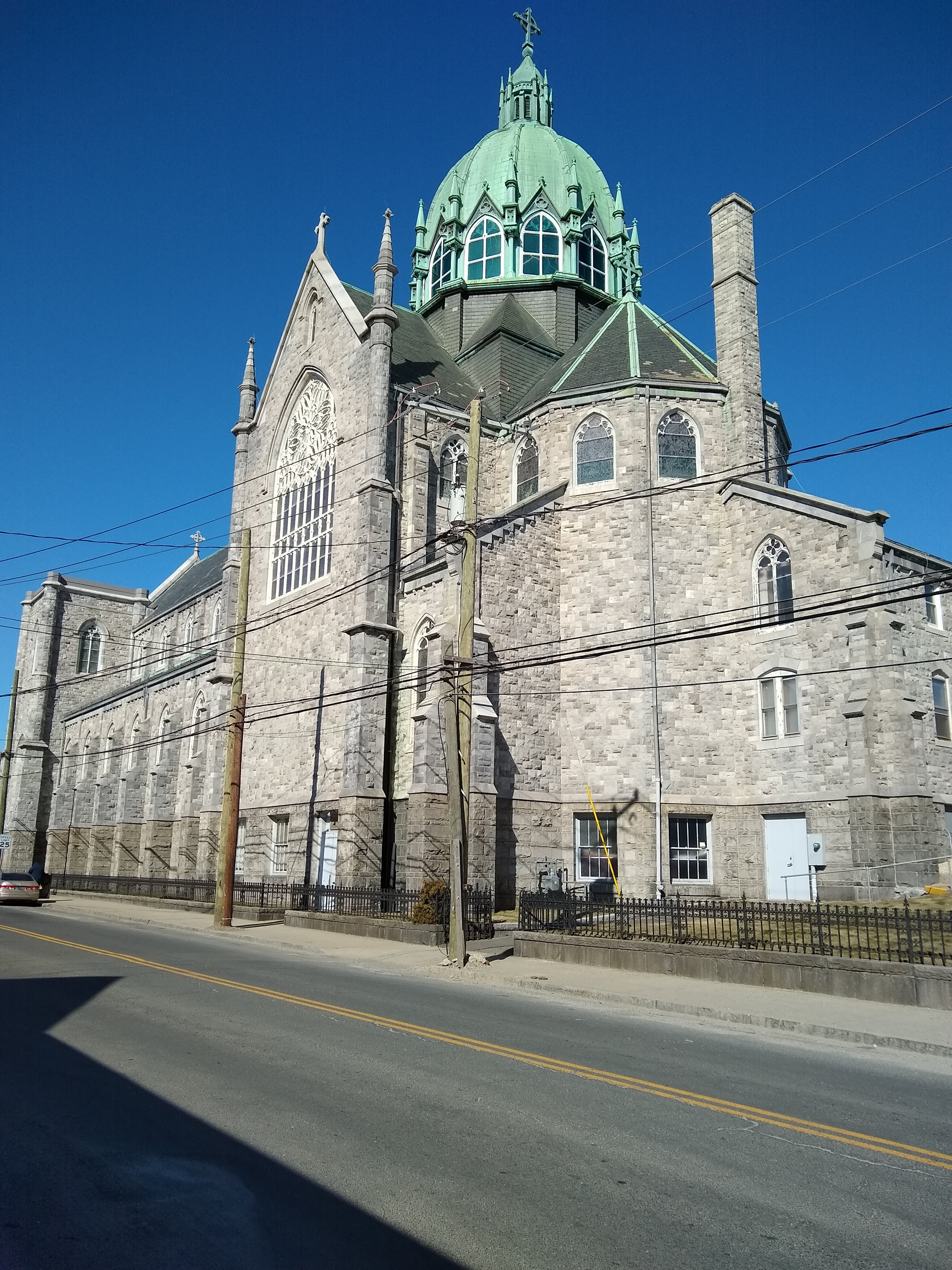
View of dome and west Transept

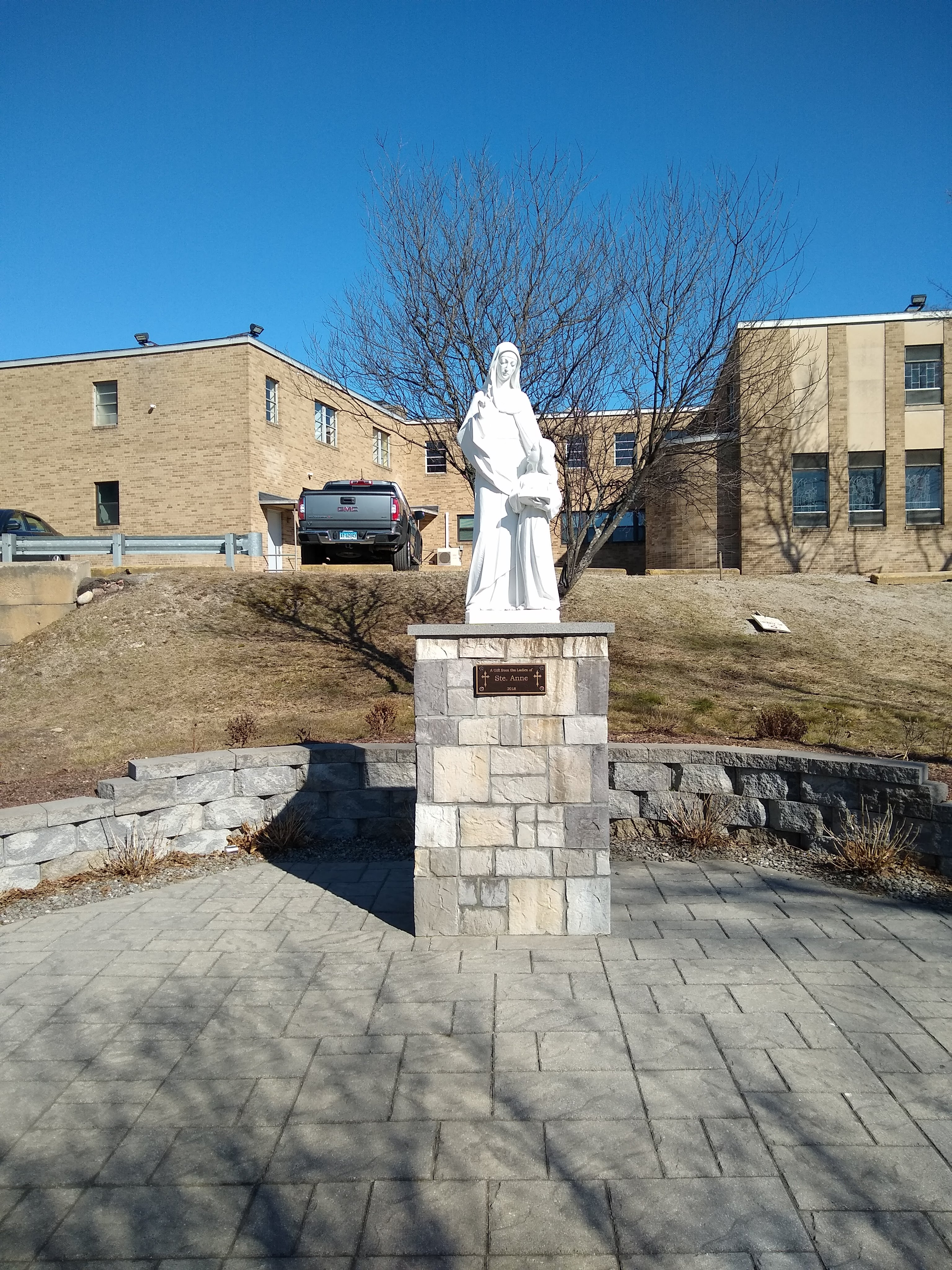
Statue of Saint Anne and Mary
