= St. Anne Chapel, Frenchtown =

Catholic chapel in the US Virgin Islands

St. Anne Chapel
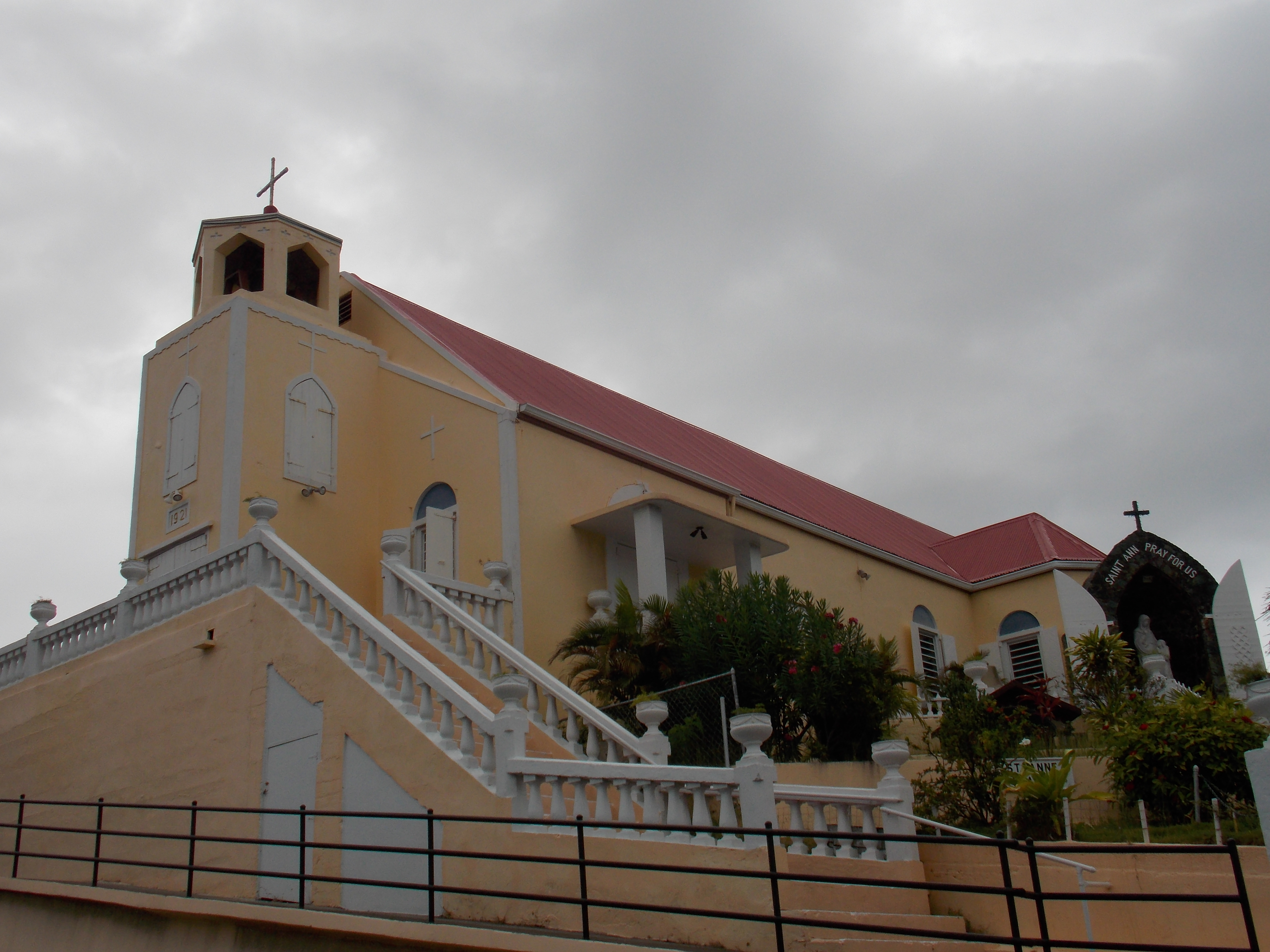

- Location within the U.S. Virgin Islands
- 18°20′17″N 64°56′34″W
- Location: Frenchtown, U.S. Virgin Islands
- Country: United States
- Denomination: Catholic Church
- Sui iuris church: Latin Church

The St. Anne Chapel is a Catholic chapel in Frenchtown, Saint Thomas, U.S. Virgin Islands, in the Diocese of St. Thomas in the Virgin Islands (Dioecesis Sancti Thomae in Insulis Virgineis).

It was opened and dedicated on December 25, 1921. It was built thanks to the promotion of Father John Guillo (who came from Michigan in 1918) and Paul Dugal. He celebrated his first communion in 1922, and later that same year, the first couple married there on 29 November.
