= St Anne's Chapel, Qrendi =

Chapel of St Anne
- Il-Kappella ta' Sant' Anna
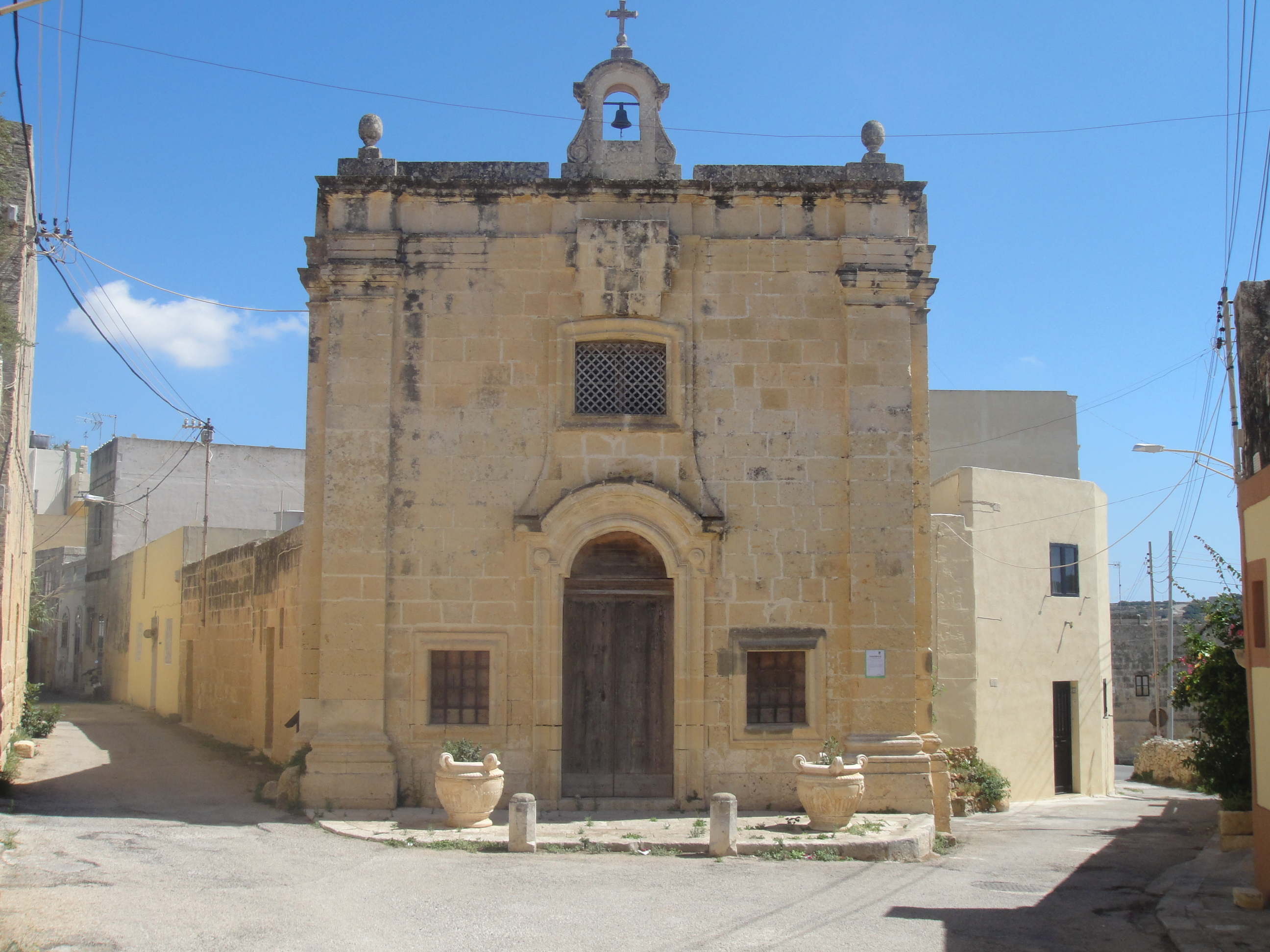

- 35°49′54.5″N 14°27′27.9″E
- Location: Qrendi
- Country: Malta
- Denomination: Roman Catholic

History
- Status: Active
- Dedication: Saint Anne

Architecture
- Functional status: Church

Administration
- Archdiocese: Malta
- Parish: Qrendi

Clergy
- Archbishop: Charles Scicluna

The Chapel of St Anne (Maltese: Il-Kappella ta' Sant'Anna) is a small Roman Catholic church located in the village of Qrendi, Malta.

== History ==
This chapel owns it origins to Giovanni Schembri who built it as a fulfillment to a vow he made during the Great Siege of Malta of 1565. Schembri vowed to build a chapel dedicated to the Virgin Mary should he and his family escape the perils of the Great Siege. Records from 1585 show that the chapel was in fact built and dedicated to the Nativity of Mary. Moreover, interesting to note is that the chapel was not mentioned in inquisitor Pietro Dusina's report of his apostolic visit to Malta in 1575 as the church was not built as yet however it is mentioned in 1598 as a 'recent building'.

The church was blessed on September 6, 1589, by the parish priest of Żurrieq who was the parish priest of Qrendi as well since the parish of Qrendi was not yet established. The feast used to be celebrated with vespers on September 8. Another feast was celebrated in honor of Saint Venera, who appears in the titular painting. In 1796, the dedication of the church was changed from that of the Nativity of Mary to that of Saint Anne. The reason for this is not known however, it may be that people started to refer to the church as St Anne's due to the image of St Anne appearing in the titular painting. That same year the chapel was restored by the initiative of the parish priest Reverend Anton Mizzi. Recently, the chapel was also restored by the parish priest Reverend Ray Toledo as part of the Qrendi Parish Millennium project.

== Interior ==
The chapel has three altars, one in the middles and two side altars. The titular painting, from an unknown artist, depicts the Virgin Mary with baby Jesus, St. Anne, St. John the Baptist, and St. Venera.
