= St Anne's =

St Anne's or St Annes may refer to:

- St. Anne's, Newfoundland and Labrador, Canada
- St Anne's, Bristol, England
- St. Annes, part of Lytham St Annes, Lancashire, England
- St Anne's College, Oxford, a college of the University of Oxford in England
- Belfast St Anne's (UK Parliament constituency), Belfast, Northern Ireland
- St. Anne's (Bahamas Parliament constituency)

== Schools in India ==
- St. Anne's Convent School, Chandigarh
- St Anne's Convent School, Baripada
- St. Anne's High School (disambiguation)

== See also ==
- Church of St. Ann (disambiguation)
- Saint Anne's Guild, a medieval religious guild in Dublin, Ireland
- St. Anne's Hospital (disambiguation)
- Saint Anne's School (disambiguation)
- St Ann's (disambiguation)
- Saint Anne (disambiguation)
- Sainte-Anne (disambiguation)
- Santa Ana (disambiguation)
- Anna (disambiguation)
- Fort Sainte Anne (disambiguation)
