= St Ann =

St Ann or Saint Ann, may refer to:

- Saint Ann or Saint Anne, the mother of the Virgin Mary
- St. Ann, Missouri, United States
- Saint Ann Parish, Jamaica
  - Saint Ann's Bay, Jamaica, capital of Saint Anne Parish
- St Ann Without, East Sussex

== See also ==
- Church of St. Ann (disambiguation)
- Saint Anne (disambiguation)
- St Ann's (disambiguation)
- St Anne's (disambiguation)
- Sainte-Anne (disambiguation)
- Saint Anne (disambiguation)
- Santa Ana (disambiguation)
- Anna (disambiguation)
- Fort Sainte Anne (disambiguation)
