= Saint Anne (disambiguation) =

Saint Anne is the mother of the Virgin Mary and grandmother of Jesus Christ, according to Christian tradition.

Saint Anne or St. Anne, may also refer to:

== People ==
- Hannah (biblical figure), also known as Anna in many languages, Old Testament figure, prophetess and mother of the prophet Samuel
- Anna the Prophetess, New Testament figure and prophetess

=== Eastern Orthodox ===
- Anna of Novgorod (1001–1050), or Ingegerd Olofsdotter, Swedish princess and grand princess consort of Kiev
- Ana-Neda (died after 1357), or Jelena of Dečani, empress consort of Bulgaria and Serbian nun
- Anna of Kashin (c. 1280–1368), Russian princess and nun

=== Roman Catholic ===
- Anne Line (c. 1563–1601), English Roman Catholic martyr
- Anna Pak Agi (1782–1839), one of the Korean Martyrs

== Places ==
=== Canada ===
- Ste. Anne
- Sainte-Anne Parish, New Brunswick, formerly named St. Anne Parish
- St. Anne Island, Ontario, see List of islands of Ontario
- Sainte-Anne-de-Beaupré, Quebec
  - Basilica of Sainte-Anne-de-Beaupré
- Sainte-Anne-de-Bellevue, Quebec, a municipality on Montreal Island
  - Ste. Anne's Hospital

=== Channel Islands ===
- St Anne, Alderney, Channel Islands

=== Jamaica ===
- Saint Ann Parish
- Saint Ann's Bay

=== Poland ===
- St. Anne Hill, a hill in Pińczów, western Poland

=== Seychelles ===
- Ste. Anne Island

=== United Kingdom ===
- St Annes, a town within Lytham St Annes

=== United States ===
- St. Anne, Illinois

== Organisations ==
- Church of St. Ann (disambiguation), the name of several churches
- St. Anne's College (disambiguation), the name of several colleges
- St. Anne's Hospital (disambiguation), the name of several hospitals
- Society of Saint Anne, a New Orleans Mardi Gras krewe
- Université Sainte-Anne, a university in Canada

== Other ==
- Anne, a given name
- Saint Anne (wall painting), an 8th–9th century Makurian wall painting

== Transportation ==
- HMS St Anne, the name of two ships of the Royal Navy
- St Anne, a schooner beached at Porthleven in 1931

== See also ==
- St Ann (disambiguation)
- Sainte-Anne (disambiguation)
- St Anne's (disambiguation)
- St Ann's (disambiguation)
- Santa Ana (disambiguation)
- Fort Sainte Anne (disambiguation)
