= Sainte-Anne =

Sainte-Anne or Ste. Anne, may refer to:

== Places ==
=== Canada ===
==== Alberta ====
- Lac Ste. Anne (disambiguation), a number of places

==== Manitoba ====
- Ste. Anne, Manitoba

==== New Brunswick ====
- Sainte-Anne Parish, New Brunswick
- Sainte-Anne-de-Madawaska, New Brunswick
- Sainte-Anne-de-Kent, New Brunswick, a community in Wellington Parish, Kent County

==== Quebec ====
- Sainte-Anne-de-Beaupré, Quebec, site of the Sainte-Anne-de-Beaupré basilica
- Sainte-Anne-de-Bellevue, Quebec, a municipality on the Island of Montreal
  - Ste. Anne's Hospital (French: Hôpital Sainte-Anne)
- Sainte-Anne-de-la-Pérade, Quebec, a municipality in the Mauricie Region
- Sainte-Anne-de-la-Rochelle, Quebec, in Le Val-Saint-François
- Sainte-Anne-de-Sabrevois, Quebec, in Le Haut-Richelieu
- Sainte-Anne-du-Lac, Quebec (disambiguation), a number of places
- Sainte-Anne-des-Lacs, Quebec, in Les Pays-d'en-Haut
- Sainte-Anne-des-Monts, Quebec, in the Gaspésie region
- Sainte-Anne-des-Plaines, Quebec, in southwestern Quebec, northwest of Montreal in Thérèse-de-Blainville
- Sainte-Anne-de-Sorel, Quebec, a parish municipality, just north of Sorel-Tracy in Le Bas-Richelieu
- Sainte-Anne (provincial electoral district), a former Quebec provincial electoral district
- Basilique Sainte-Anne-de-Varennes, a basilica in Varennes

=== France ===
- Sainte-Anne, Doubs
- Sainte-Anne, Gers
- Sainte-Anne, Loir-et-Cher
- Sainte-Anne, Guadeloupe
- Sainte-Anne, Martinique
- Sainte-Anne-d'Auray, in the Morbihan département
- Sainte-Anne-Saint-Priest, in the Haute-Vienne département
- Sainte-Anne-sur-Brivet, in the Loire-Atlantique département
- Sainte-Anne-sur-Gervonde, in the Isère département
- Sainte-Anne-sur-Vilaine, in the Ille-et-Vilaine département
- a lieu-dit in Ledringhem in the Nord département
- Sainte-Anne Hospital Center in Paris

=== Belgium ===
- Château de Lavaux-Sainte-Anne, in the Namur province

=== Fictional locations ===
- Sainte Anne, one of the planets in The Fifth Head of Cerberus

== Other uses ==
- Ste. Anne (film), a 2021 Canadian film
- Fort Sainte Anne (disambiguation)
- List of rivers named Sainte-Anne

== See also ==
- Saint Anne (disambiguation)
- St Ann (disambiguation)
- St Anne's (disambiguation)
- St Ann's (disambiguation)
- Santa Ana (disambiguation)
- Anna (disambiguation)
