= St. Anne's High School =

St. Anne's High School may refer to:

- St. Anne's School, Jodhpur, Rajasthan, India
- St. Anne's High School, Orlem, Mumbai, India
- St. Anne's High School, Fort, Mumbai, India (Convent of Jesus and Mary)
- St. Anne's Convent School, Chandigarh, India
- St. Ann's High School, Secunderabad, India

== See also ==
- Saint Anne's School (disambiguation)
