= St Ann's =

St Ann's or St Anns may refer to:

== Places ==
- Sainte-Anne Parish, New Brunswick, formerly called St. Ann's Parish
- St. Anns, Ontario, West Lincoln, Ontario, Canada
- St. Anns, Nova Scotia, Canada
- St Ann's, Nottingham, England, UK
- St Ann's, London, a neighbourhood in the London Borough of Haringey, England, UK
  - St Ann's (Haringey ward), London, England
- St Ann's, Trinidad and Tobago

== Churches ==
- St. Ann's Anglican Church, Belmopan, Belize
- St. Ann's Church, Dawson Street, Dublin, Ireland
- St Ann's Church, Manchester, UK

=== United States ===
- St. Ann's Cathedral (Great Falls, Montana)
- St. Ann's Church (Bronx, New York)
- St. Ann's and the Holy Trinity Church, Brooklyn Heights, Brooklyn
- Saint Ann Parish, Jamaica
- St. Ann's Church (Manhattan)
- St. Ann's Roman Catholic Church (Manhattan)
- St. Ann's Episcopal Church (Nashville, Tennessee)
- St. Ann's Episcopal Church (Richford, Vermont)

== Institutions ==
- St Ann's College, North Adelaide, Australia
- St. Ann's High School, Secunderabad, India
- Saint Ann's School (Brooklyn), Brooklyn Heights, Brooklyn
- St Ann's Hospital, Dorset
- St. Ann's Infant and Maternity Home, Avondale, Maryland, USA
- St. Ann's School, Ahmedabad, a private high school in Ahmedabad, India
- St Anns (shopping centre), Harrow, England

== Other uses ==
- St Ann's Ground, cricket ground
- St. Ann's Warehouse, former church, now an arts building in New York
- St. Ann's Academy (Victoria, British Columbia), building in Victoria, British Columbia
- St. Ann's Federation Building, Steuben County, New York
- St. Ann's Fort, historic military fort in Barbados
- St Ann's (Remuera), historic home in Remuera, Auckland, New Zealand

== See also ==
- Saint Ann's Bay, Jamaica
- St Ann's Head Lighthouse, Wales, United Kingdom
- St. Ann's Rangers F.C., a football club in Trinidad and Tobago
- St Ann's Road railway station
- St. Ann's Well, Malvern
- St. Ann's Well Gardens, Hove
- Anna (disambiguation)
- Fort Sainte Anne (disambiguation)
- St Ann (disambiguation)
- Saint Anne (disambiguation)
- St Anne's (disambiguation)
- St. Ann's Academy (disambiguation)
- Sainte-Anne (disambiguation)
- Santa Ana (disambiguation)
