= St. Anne's Hospital =

St. Anne's Hospital or Saint Ann's Hospital may refer to:

== UK ==
- St. Ann's Hospital, Dorset, psychiatric institution in Dorset, England
- St Anne's Hospital, Ripon, former almshouse in North Yorkshire, England
- St. Ann's Hospital, medical facility in Haringey, London, England

== US ==
- Saint Anns Hospital, in Cuyahoga County of Cleveland, Ohio; see List of hospitals in Ohio
- St Anne's Hospital, Chicago, Illinois; see List of hospitals in Illinois
- Saint Anne's Hospital (Fall River, Massachusetts)
- St. Ann's Hospital, in the Roman Catholic Diocese of Columbus, Ohio

== Other ==
- St. Anne's Hospital, early name for Mount Lawley Hospital, Australia
- Ste. Anne's Hospital (French: Hôpital Sainte-Anne), Ste-Anne-de-Bellevue, Montreal Island, Quebec, Canada
- St. Anne's Hospital, forerunner of St. Gertrude's Hospital, Copenhagen, Denmark
- Sainte-Anne Hospital Center (French: Hôpital Sainte-Anne), Paris, France
  - St. Anne's Hospital for the Insane, in Paris, France
- St. Anne's Hospital, part of St. Luke's Hospital, Rathgar, Ireland
- St. Anne's Hospital, early name for Archbishop Loayza National Hospital, Lima, Peru
- St Anne's Hospital (Harare), Zimbabwe

== See also ==
- Saint Anne (disambiguation)
- Church of St. Ann (disambiguation)
