= Santa Ana =

Santa Ana or Santa Anna may refer to:

== People ==
- Saint Anne, mother of the Virgin Mary
- Ingegerd Olofsdotter, or Anna (c. 1001–1050), daughter of Olaf, King of Sweden, and saint
- Benito Fernández de Santa Ana (1707–1761), Spanish missionary in Texas
- Antonio López de Santa Anna (1794–1876), Mexican general and politician
- Santa Anna (Comanche) (c. 1798–1849), Native American tribal leader
- Muriel Santa Ana (born 1968), Argentine actress

== Places ==
=== Argentina ===
- Santa Ana, Entre Ríos
- Santa Ana, Jujuy
- Santa Ana, Misiones

=== Bolivia ===
- Santa Ana del Yacuma
- Santa Ana de Velasco

=== Cape Verde ===
- Santa Ana, Cape Verde

=== Colombia ===
- Santa Ana, Magdalena

=== Costa Rica ===
- Santa Ana (canton)
- Santa Ana, Costa Rica

=== Ecuador ===
- Santa Ana (La Florida), an archaeological site
- Santa Ana Canton, Ecuador, in Manabí province
- Santa Ana Hill, Guayaquil

=== El Salvador ===
- Santa Ana Department
- Santa Ana, El Salvador
- Santa Ana Volcano

=== Honduras ===
- Santa Ana, La Paz
- Santa Ana, Francisco Morazán

=== Mexico ===
- Santa Ana, La Trinitaria
- Santa Ana, Oaxaca
- Santa Ana, Sonora
- Santa Ana Ateixtlahuaca
- Santa Ana Cuauhtémoc
- Santa Ana de Guadalupe, near San José de los Reynoso
- Santa Ana del Valle
- Santa Ana Tavela
- Santa Ana Tlapacoyan
- Santa Ana Yareni
- Santa Ana Zegache

=== Panama ===
- Santa Ana, Los Santos
- Santa Ana, Panama City

=== Papua New Guinea ===
- St. Anna (mission station), a Roman Catholic mission station during the German colonial period in New Guinea

=== Paraguay ===
- Santa Ana (Asunción), a barrio of Asunción

=== Peru ===
- Santa Ana District, Castrovirreyna
- Santa Ana District, La Convención

=== Philippines ===
- Santa Ana, Cagayan
- Santa Ana, Manila
- Santa Ana, Pampanga
- Santa Ana, Taguig

=== Solomon Islands ===
- Santa Ana (Solomon Islands), now known as Owaraha

=== Spain ===
- Santa Ana, Cáceres
- Santa Ana, Zamora
- Santa Ana de Pusa, Toledo

=== United States ===
- Santa Ana, California
  - Santa Ana Regional Transportation Center
  - Santa Ana Canyon
  - Santa Ana Freeway
  - Santa Ana Mountains
  - Santa Ana River
- Santa Anna Township, DeWitt County, Illinois
- Santa Ana Pueblo, New Mexico
- Santa Anna, Texas, in Coleman County
- Santa Anna, Starr County, Texas
- St. Anna, Wisconsin

=== Uruguay ===
- Santa Ana, Canelones
- Santa Ana, Colonia

=== Venezuela ===
- Santa Ana Municipality, Anzoátegui
- Santa Ana de Coro
- Santa Ana, Nueva Esparta

== Music ==
- "Santianna" or "Santa Ana", a traditional Mexican sea-shanty
- "Santa Ana", a song by The Shadows from the 1964 album The Sound of The Shadows
- "Santa Ana", a 1973 song by Bruce Springsteen from the 1998 album Tracks

== Ships ==
- Santa Anna (1522 ship), a 16th-century war ship of the Knights Hospitaller
- Santa Anna, a Manila galleon captured and sunk by Thomas Cavendish in 1587
- Spanish ship Santa Ana (1784), a Spanish ship taken by the British in the Battle of Trafalgar in 1805
- Santa Anna (1806 ship), a Spanish ship that a British privateer captured in 1806 that became a whaling ship
- Svyataya Anna (St Anna), a Russian brig that disappeared in the Arctic in 1914

== Other uses ==
- Santa Ana Church, Amazonas, Peru
- Santa Ana metro station, in Santiago, Chile
- Santa Ana Peak, a mountain in Alaska
- Santa Ana River, a river in southern California, United States
- Santa Ana winds, strong seasonal winds in Southern California and northern Baja California
- Owa language, or Santa Ana, of the Solomon Islands

== See also ==
- Santana (disambiguation)
- Santa Ana winds (disambiguation)
- Saint Anne (disambiguation)
- Sainte-Anne (disambiguation)
  - Fort Sainte Anne (disambiguation)
- St Ann's (disambiguation)
- St Anne's (disambiguation)
- Anna (disambiguation)
- Sant'Anna (disambiguation)
- Santa Anita (disambiguation)
- Santa Ana Drags, the first drag strip in the United States
- Santa Ana Line, a former train route in California, U.S.
