= John Navone =

American Jesuit philosopher and professor (1930–2016)

John J. Navone, SJ
- Rev. Fr. John J. Navone, SJ
- Born: October 19, 1930; Seattle, Washington, U.S.
- Died: December 25, 2016 (aged 86); Spokane, Washington, U.S.
- Occupation: Professor Emeritus. Pontifical Gregorian University
- Known for: Theologian, author, speaker, priest

John J. Navone S.J. (born October 19, 1930 – died December 25, 2016) was an American Jesuit priest, theologian, philosopher, educator, author, raconteur, and Professor Emeritus of Pontifical Gregorian University in Rome, Italy. Having reached the mandatory age, he retired from the Gregorian, returned to the Society's Oregon Province, and taught at Gonzaga University in Spokane, Washington.

== Early life ==
John Joseph Navone was born in Seattle on 19 October 1930, the son of Giacomo "Jack" Navone and Juliet Micheli Navone. At the time of his birth, his father was not yet a US citizen, so Navone has dual citizenship in the United States and Italy (and therefore the European Union). He has five siblings: Joseph, James, George, Helen, and Catherine. He received his primary education at St. Anne School. His first three years of high school were spent at O'Dea High School, operated by the Congregation of Christian Brothers. He transferred to the Jesuit Seattle Preparatory School for his senior year, graduating from there in 1948.

== Education ==
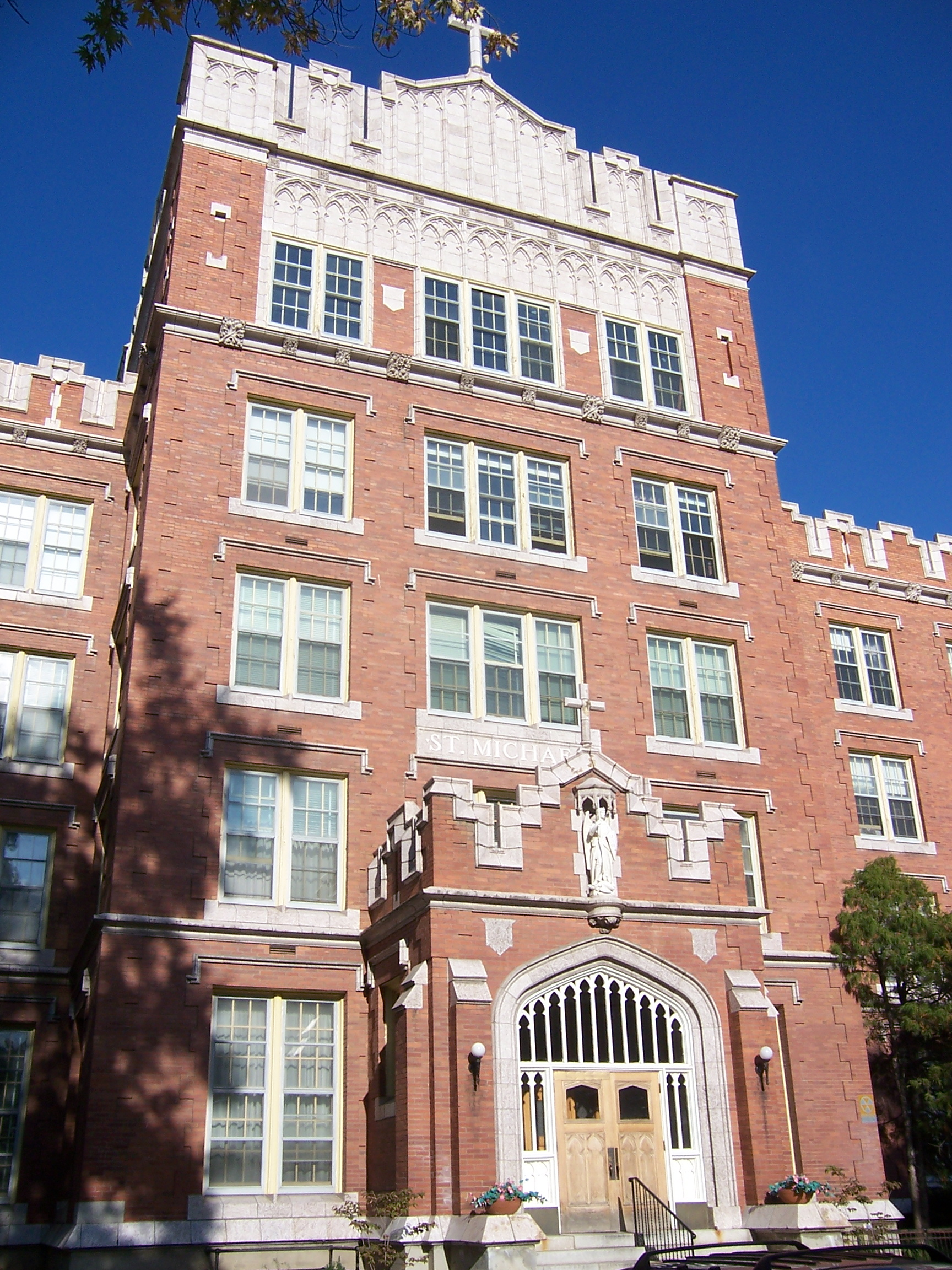
The former Jesuit Seminary at Mount St. Michael near Spokane, WA.

Navone matriculated at Seattle University his freshman year before entering the Jesuit novitiate of St. Francis Xavier at Sheridan, Oregon on 14 August 1949 and studied there for four years. The next step of his education was at the Mount St. Michael Philosophate, then a Jesuit seminary associated with Gonzaga University in Spokane, Washington.

He received his master's degree in philosophy from Gonzaga in 1956. From 1959 to 1963 he studied theology at Regis College, University of Toronto in Toronto, Ontario. From 1963 until 2009, he resided in Rome, where he received his doctorate in theology from the Pontifical Gregorian University in 1966 His doctoral dissertation, History and Faith in the Thought of Dr. Alan Richardson, was published in 1966 by the SCM Press, London, marking the first time a Catholic doctoral dissertation was published by this Anglican - Protestant press. The book appeared in the Contemporary Theology Series to which Barr, Macquarrie, Moltmann, Ogden and Torrance contributed.

== Academic career ==
From 1956 until 1959, he taught Latin, French, German, and sociology at Seattle Preparatory School.

Navone began teaching biblical theology at the Gregorian University in 1967, spending his career in that department. He also taught courses in theology of history, narrative theology, and the theology and spirituality of beauty.

His interests in research, writing, and teaching never led him to an official administrative position at the Gregorian, but in the earlier years of his tenure there, the university lacked a formal organization for institutional development, and Navone began informal work along those lines. Because of his outgoing personality, he soon became an unofficial spokesperson for the university, particularly with the American media. These activities led to relationships with various bureau chiefs which in turn led to a number of articles in the media concerning "the Greg". These articles often contained comments made by Navone.

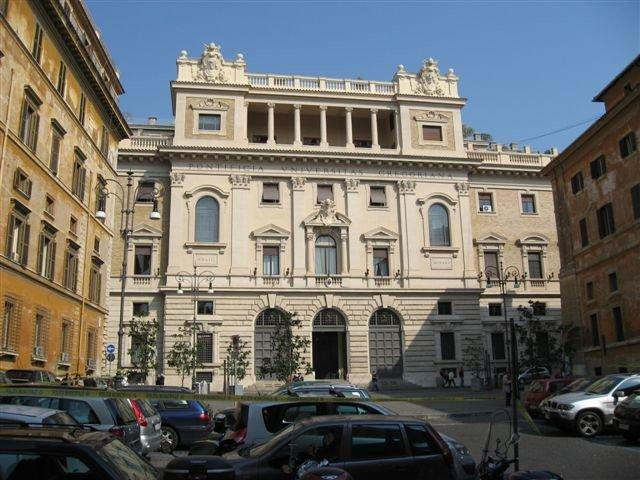
Navone's residence during his tenure at the Pontifical Gregorian University

Navone made significant and relatively early contributions to the discipline of narrative theology. Leading sociologist Andrew Greeley wrote:

"There are, it seems to me, three tendencies in contemporary American Catholic theology, two positive and one disgraceful ... The second tendency, linked closely to the first in basic themes, but very different from it in approach is "story theology" or "narrative theology" with its paradigm of religious experience, religious symbol and religious story. John Navone and John Shea are the best known and the best practitioners. Their work is compatible with and accessible to some of the most exciting developments in American social scientific and humanistic thinking at the present time and has immediate practical implications for homiletics, catechetics and apologetics. Story theology is the greatest and, I think, most important theological development of our time and will so be judged for decades and centuries to come."

Navone's seminal work and collaboration with Catholic theologian Johann Baptist Metz on narrative theology, also called "The Theology of Story", have led to several Catholic and Protestant seminaries worldwide using his books as theology textbooks.

As of 2010, Navone has involved himself with teaching a course of Thomistic philosophy and theology for the Catholic Studies program of the History Department of Gonzaga University, where he serves as an adjunct professor. in the spring of 2010, he taught a course on Leadership and Spirituality for the Professional Leadership Department at Gonzaga.

Navone's book Tellers of the Word was America's Book of the Month Club selection for May 1981.

== Religious career ==
Navone entered the Society of Jesus in 1949 and was ordained in 1962.

Of Navone's twenty-three books, five have been associated with the development of narrative theology and the work of Bernard Lonergan, his teacher and eventual colleague at the Pontifical Gregorian University.

Two of his most recent books have won recognition in both Europe and the United States for his contribution to the theology and spirituality of beauty. Gesa E Thiessen [Theological Aesthetics: A Reader (London: SCM, 2004)] ranks Navone among 95 contributors to this field from the time of Justin Martyr in 165. Edward Farley of Vanderbilt University Divinity School calls attention to Navone's work in this field as one of the "five significant twentieth-century Catholic theologies of beauty" in his book Faith and Beauty: A theological Aesthetic (Burlington, VT: Ashgate, 2001), pp. 74–81.

Navone was in Rome for the final years of Vatican II and was acquainted with many of the participants, including the observers from the Church of England.

Navone was keynote speaker at the Anglican clergy conference at St. George's House, Windsor Castle, England, Dec. 4 to 8, 1978. He addressed the 50 Anglican priests daily on "Communicating Christ", a subject which is the title of his book published in 1976.

== Quotations in major media ==
=== Quotation in Pope Francis' 2013 book, Papa Francesco: Il Nuovo Papa si Racconta ===
(Translation from Italian) "It (patience) is a theme that I (Pope Francis) have pondered over the years after my having read the book of John Navone, an Italian American author, with the striking title, The Theology of Failure, in which he explains how Jesus lived patiently. In the experience of limits, he (Pope Francis) adds, patience is forged in dialogue with human limits/limitations. There are times when our lives do not call so much for our "doing" as for our "enduring," for bearing up (from the Greek hypomone) with our own limitations and those of others. Being patient – he explains – means accepting the fact that it takes time to mature and develop. Living with patience allows for time to integrate and shape our lives."

=== Quotations in Time magazine ===
==== Friendship with Gore Vidal ====
Father Navone developed a friendship with author Gore Vidal during his years in Rome. When Time magazine did a cover article on Vidal, the friendship was mentioned:

"Vidal seems to delight in the company of clerics. One of the people he dines with in Rome is American Jesuit John Navone, a theologian at the Pontifical Gregorian University. When Navone once brought a group of visiting Jesuits to Vidal's apartment, Vidal greeted them with the question "Out for a night in Transylvania?" On another occasion, at dinner, Vidal teased Navone: "Now, John, tell us what your idea of heaven is…all about those angels." Navone gently replied: "There are no harps. We are already there. Heaven is communicating with friends." Moved, Vidal had nothing to say.

==== Satanism ====
From Time cover story "Satan Returns".

Jesuit theologian John Navone of Rome's Pontifical Gregorian University, who held a "Devil Day" at the Gregorian recently to discuss the theology of the Devil, so far is not seriously alarmed by the recrudescence of Satanism. In modern Devil cults, he argues, the Devil "is more often a type of magician playmate, the product of a Playboy culture rather than the malign personal being found in Scripture. These cults tend to use the Devil for a type of arcane amusement; whereas the unamusing Devil that appears in Scripture manages to use men for his dark purposes."

==== In Search of a Pope ====
From Time cover story "In Search of a Pope":

Father Navone, an American who teaches at the Jesuits' Pontifical Gregorian University in Rome, says such perplexities "no longer can be solved by a one-man fiat. The new Pope must avail himself of the wisdom of the church by calling a Vatican III to resolve the monumental doctrinal, disciplinary and moral problems."

==== Who Was Jesus? ====
From Time cover story "Who was Jesus"

Says Father John Navone of the Pontifical Gregorian University in Rome: "A kind of intellectualist bias has grown up: unless you are aware of the very latest academic theory about the Bible, you might as well not read it. The result is a dangerous gap between the thinking of elite universities and the beliefs of thriving congregations."

=== Quotation in Life Magazine ===
==== A Wind of Change ====
Father Navone as quoted in Life Magazine:

For the "Greg," as its students calls it, is the Church's Oxbridge, Sorbonne and Yale-Harvard, all combined in one. The Greg's Father John Navone calls it "the Crucible of Catholicism." It is the university for any seminarian who aspires to prestige and power in the Church: of today's cardinals, 35 percent attended the Gregorian; so did the last eight Popes.

==== Who The Devil Is ====
Father Navone wrote in his Life article:

"In traditional theology, the devil is a malfunctioning, deranged angel. Devils are a category of angels that slipped. There is a radical distinction there. They don't think right. They don't love right. Something that was created good went wrong. I think the basic Catholic does believe that there is a real devil and there are real devils."

=== Quotations in The Times ===
Father Navone was featured in a 1989 Times article:

Under the guise of obedience to the US church—which is so tolerant of those who criticize basic items of faith—they (dissidents) can attack teaching from Rome, and still appear to be good Catholics. As Father John Navone, of the Gregorian University of Rome says, this will have the effect of eliminating from theology all Vatican teaching that is not declared infallible. Theologians are in effect putting themselves above the church.

The Pope is now calling his theologians to order. Dissent is feasible, even under this Pope, but it has to be loyal. "To do the opposite," says Father Navone, "to prize dissent and contradiction for their own sake, is often to author theology that is immediately appealing, but is likely to die on the vine. In the long term the church will simply not recognize it as its own."

"Anyone who does not adhere to the basic commitments of the Catholic tradition," says Father Navone, "should not style himself a Catholic theologian."

=== Quotations in the International Herald Tribune ===
==== Barry James article on the Gregorian ====
The International Herald Tribune quotes Father Navone:

"I think what makes this university incomparable is that when we give a written examination, the student has the right to turn in his paper in Italian, Spanish, Portuguese, French, German or English," said the Reverend John Navone of Seattle, a professor of New Testament Theology, who has taught at the Gregorian since 1967. "Most professors can handle an examination in any of those six languages – plus Latin."

Father Navone said the university may appear quieter today, in comparison to the ferment of 1970, because "many of the things that were once considered startling new changes have just become part of life here. If the mood is quieter now than it was a decade ago, this has had no impact on academic freedom at the Gregorian, Father Navone said."The attitude seems to be that if you have been approved to teach here, nobody is worried about what you teach or how you teach it. The Gregorian is dynamically in the center. It is certainly not conservative when you think of some of the other institutions in Rome and elsewhere. On the other hand, it is certainly not as daring as some other places."

==== Barry James article on Madeleine Albright's conversion ====
James again quotes Navone:

"But for the Roman Catholic Church, the conversion of a Jew poses fewer problems than that of a Protestant", said the Reverend John Navone of the Pontifical Gregorian University in Rome. "Since we both hold the Old Testament to be true," he said, "there is no problem for us in accepting Jews and no need for them to renounce their previous beliefs."

==== Barry James article on Americans and religion ====
"Just because people say they are religious, does not make it so, no more than if they say they are intelligent or moral," said Father John Navone, a Jesuit at the Gregorian University in Rome.

Navone, who is an American, said the findings (of the Pew survey) were meaningless without a clearer definition of religion, and he strongly contested the suggestion that Italian people were not spiritual. Going to Mass every Sunday might be an indication of religious faith, but was not a proof of it, he said. "All the problems that Jesus had were with religious people," Navone added. According to the time, the Scribes and Pharisees had religion, and Jesus didn't at all.

Navone said some of the most "obnoxious" people he knew profess to be religious, and some of the most religious were those who did not pretend to have the answers. "The truly religious people I know don't boast about it," Navone said. "They have a radical humility. And that goes for Einstein as well."

Navone said many American who profess to be religious had a warped sense of religion. They think religion is real estate and "they define the Kingdom of God with a geopolitical reality," he said. He assailed what he called the "crackpots" in U.S. fundamentalist Protestantism, who he said were inciting war in the Middle East "because they think it will hasten the second coming of Christ."

=== Quotation in The Australian ===
Shortly after the election of Cardinal Ratzinger to the Papacy, Barry James interviewed Father Navone and submitted the article containing the following quotation to The Australian:

A longtime Jesuit theologian in Rome said today Pope Benedict XVI will be a clear doctrinal teacher who will attempt to reaffirm the Roman Catholic Church's roots in Europe and end what he called the "dumbing down" of Christian faith.

"We are going to see the real Joseph Ratzinger," said the Reverend John Navone, who teaches at the Pontifical Gregorian University. "He is a renaissance man of many qualities, really a profound theologian."

Reverend Navone said the choice of the Pope's name taps deep into the roots of European culture and probably was intended to refer to Saint Benedict of Nursia, the 6th-century founder of the Benedictine Order, which preserved Christian civilization and writing through the Dark Ages."

Reverend Navone said the new pope, who has written a book about Europe, was determined to restore Christian doctrine in a continent where congregations are abandoning the church en masse, even if it means a smaller and purer church.

The new pope, who warned about the "dictatorship of relativism" in a homily before entering the conclave, "is going to clarify the meaning of Christianity and Catholicism," for teachers in Catholic universities. "And Catholics are going to find out what their faith is all about." "He is going to be an antidote to those who say that all religions are the same," while firmly promoting Christian values amid the rise of Islam.

The new pope will also be "the best antidote against the dumbing down of Catholicism," Reverend Navone said. "I think he is going to demand more quality and better preparation for teachers in Catholic universities."

Reverend Navone said that the new pope was "an extremely intelligent traditionalist" and at the same time a modest man whose talents had been eclipsed by "the showman pope." He said that it was providential that the new pope's first trip outside Italy would be to a world youth festival in Cologne this August. But after that, he said the pope would probably choose to remain in the Vatican and provide doctrinal thinking for the Church rather than repeating John Paul's frenetic globetrotting.

Reverend Navone said the conclave's decision was the most dramatic affirmation of the role of the German Church since the collapse of the Holy Roman Empire. For a country that has experienced "so much humiliation" in its recent history, the election would reaffirm "the German role in the Christian history of Europe," he said.

Reverend Navone said German thought brought a profound theological tradition to the Church, but that the pope "has probably the best sense of history and culture" of all the cardinals. "It is a marvelous affirmation of what the German Church has to offer," he said.

=== Quotation in USA Today ===
"The pope is trying to keep an even-handed policy," observes Father John Navone, a Jesuit academic. "He is trying to defang and declaw the more extreme groups among the Muslims and elsewhere, just as he did with the Soviet Union. There is a method in this." "Overall," Navone says,"the Catholic Church has taken the role of mediator between the United States and the rest of the world. There's only one superpower, the United States. The church is trying very much to be the peacemaker."

Navone and others suggest that the planned visit to Cuba may accelerate the pace of change in that country, just as the ties with Libya may allow the diplomatically isolated Gadhafi means to re-establish dialogue with Europe and the U.S.

== Bibliography ==
=== Books ===
1966 History and Faith in the Thought of Dr. Alan Richardson (London: SCM), 161 pages.

1967 Personal Witness: A Biblical Spirituality (New York: Sheed & Ward), 239 pages.

1968 Temoignage Personnel: Une spiritualité biblique (Mulhouse).

1968 Testimonio personal: Una espiritualidad biblica (Santander).

1969 Il dogma trinitario (Rome: Gregorian University), 70 pages.

1969 Bibliografia lucana de articoli (Rome: Gregorian University), 78 pages.

1970 Themes of St. Luke (Rome: Gregorian University), 247 pages.

1971 Theologies of History (Rome: Gregorian University), 185 pages.

1974 A Theology of Failure (New York: Paulist Press), 129 pages.

1974 Everyman's Odyssey: Seven Plays Seen as Modern Myths about Man's Quest for Personal Integrity (Rome: Gregorian University), 251 pages.

1976 Communicating Christ (Slough, U.K.: St. Paul Publications), 239 pages.

1976 Teologia del fallimento (Alba: Edizioni Paoline), 245 pages.

1977 Towards a Theology of Story (Slough, U.K.: St. Paul Publications), 239 pages.

1979 The Jesus Story: Our Life as Story in Christ (Collegeville: Liturgical Press), 254 pages.

1981 Tellers of the Word (New York: LeJacq), (Book of the Month Selection), 341 pages.

1984 Gospel Love: A Narrative Theology (Wilmington: Michael Glazier), 159 pages.

1984 Triumph Through Failure (Homebush, Australia: St. Paul Publications), 187 pages.

1985 Freedom and Transformation in Christ (Rome: Gregorian University), 159 pages.

1986 The Story of the Passion (Rome: Gregorian University), 415 pages.

1986 Narratori della Parola (Casale Monferrato: Edizioni Piemme), 335 pages.

1986 L'amore evangelico (Rome: Borla), 204 pages.

1986 The Dynamic of the Question in Narrative Theology (Rome: Gregorian U.), 110 pages.

1988 Teologia del fallimento (Roma: Edizioni Pontificia Universita Gregoriana), 245 pages (re-published, see 1976 above).

1989 Self-giving and Sharing: The Trinity and Human Fulfillment (Collegeville: Liturgical Press), 161 pages.

1990 Seeking God in Story (Collegeville: Liturgical Press), 335 pages.

1990 Dono di sé e comunione: la Trinità e l'umana realizzazione (Assisi: Cittadella Editrice), 269 pages.

1996 Towards a Theology of Beauty (Collegeville: Liturgical Press), 91 pages.

1996 The Land and the Spirit of Italy (New York: Legas), 215 pages.

1998 Verso una teologia della bellezza (Milan: Paoline), 118 pages.

1998 The Land and the Spirit of Italy: The Texture of Italian Religious Culture. Revised and Expanded Edition (New York: Legas), 223 pages.

1998 Italia Natura e Genio, tr. by Saverio di Paola, scj (Rome: Edizioni Dehoniane), pp. 316, wins the National Prize "Premio Capri - S. Michele" XV Edition.

1999 Enjoying God's Beauty (Collegeville: Liturgical Press), 134 pages.

1999 Em busca de uma teologia da beleza (São Paulo: Paulus), 123 pages.

2001 Lead, Radiant Spirit - Our Gospel Quest (Collegeville: Liturgical Press), 128 pages.

2012 Atheism Today: A Christian Response (Ithaca NY: Ithaca Press), 256 pages.

=== Articles ===
==== The Bible Today ====
1963 "The Patriarchs of Faith, Hope, Love," April

1963 "In Our Image and Likeness," November

1964 "The Parable of the Banquet," November

1965 "Leading Ideas in St. John's Gospel," November

1965 "We Have Seen His Glory," December

1968 "The Glory and Humiliation of Christ: Luke's Diptych Development, Feb

1968 "The Fatherhood of God in Luke," December

1970 "The Lucan Banquet Community," December

1971 "Time," October

1972 "The Journey Theme in Luke-Acts," February

1972 "The Apocalyptic Theology of History," March

1972 "Characteristics of Apocalyptic," April

1973 "Biblical Conflict with Magic and Sorcery," February

1973 "Speeches in Acts," March

1975 "Dreams in the Bible, November

1999 "Spiritual Journey in the New Testament," May/June

1999 "The Mountain of God," July/August

2000 "The Ungracious Refuser of Festivities," May/June

2000 "Garden and Wilderness Metaphors," September/October

2000 "The Fullness and Abundance of God," November/December

2001 "Famine, Hunger, and Thirst in the Bible," May/June

2001 "Spiritual Pedagogy in the Gospel of Mark," July/August

2002 "The Compassion of Jesus in John," March

2002 "The Compassion of Jesus in the Synoptics," July

2002 "Death, Satan and Sin," November

2003 "Preeminence Among Biblical Siblings," March

2004 "Luke-Acts and the Roman Empire," July/August

2004 "The Messianic Banquet of Wisdom," September/October

2005 "Shepherding in the Hebrew Bible," March

2006 "The Way and the Journey in Luke-Acts," March

2006 "Luke's Banquet Theme: Five Aspects," July/August

2007 "Scriptures for Remembering," May/June

2008 "Write a Gospel," January

==== Homiletic & Pastoral Review ====
1971 Idols of the Tribe, LXXI, July

1974 The Theology of Failure, LXXIV/5, February

1975 The Social Responsibility of Christians, LXXV/10, July

1976 Christian minimalism vs. ideological maximalism, LXXVI/7, April 1976

1980 The graves of craving and self-fulfillment, LXXXI/2, November

1986 What is "love"?, LXXXVI/6, March 1986

1987 Communicating Christ as a friend, LXXXVIII/1, October

1988 Saints for all seasons, LXXXVIII/5, February

1988 Salvation without God? LXXXIX/1, October

1990 The image and glory of God, XCI/1, October

1992 Media hostility to religion, XCII/11-12, August–September

1998 Spiritual acedia, torpor and depression, XCIX/11-12, August–September

2000 The uniqueness of Jesus Christ, C/11-12, August–September

2001 Christianity, modernity, postmodernity, CI/11-12, August–September

2002 No tradition—no civilization, CIII/1, October

2003 God's saving beauty, CIII/5, February

2004 Healing the Heart, CIV/4, January

2004 Theological Pitfalls and Their Consequences, CV/3, December

2005 The Nearness of God, CVI/6 June

2005 Our Triune God, October

2006 "God Alone is Good," (Mark 10:18), May

2006 Our Adversary, August

2006 The Vision, Hope and Love of Christ, November

2007 Heroes, saints and leaders for human development, CVII/8, May

2007 Our Creator God, CVII/9, June

2009 God reminds us to Remember, May

2010 The Creator's presence and activity in creation, November

2011 The grace and call of hospitality, November

2013 Christian life and education: The Christian belief in God, February

2013 Existence as Person in and through Others, August

2014 Communion, Community and Communication, January

==== Human Development ====
2011 Famine to Fullness: Metaphors for Spiritual Development, vol. 32, no. 4: Winter.

2012 Finding God and Ourselves in Parables, vol. 33, no. 2, Summer.

==== Inside The Vatican ====
1999 Radiant Madonnas, May

==== Messenger of St. Anthony ====
1983 Rejection and Christian Witness, 91/10 October

1984 Love is Patient 87/11, November

1984 Love Pays Attention 87/12, December

1986 Jesus: The Life Story for Human Development and Fulfillment (C.F.), 89/1, January

1986 Learning to Know God (Cover Feature), 89/2, February

1986 Suffering Out of Love (Cover Feature), 89/3, March

1987 Christ's Freedom for All, 90/2, February

1987 For Peace: the first commandment (Cover Feature), 90/9, September

1987 Our Question-Raising God, 90/10, October

1988 Finding Ourselves in the Jesus Story (C.F.), 90/2, February

1988 The Church An Icon of the Trinity (C.F.), 90/11, November

1989 Spiritual Amnesia: Identity Crisis, 91/2, February

1989 Attention Given 91/3, March

1989 Home, homelessness and homecoming 91/9, September

1990 No escape from finitude, 92/2, February

1990 No escape from finitude, 92/3, March

1998 Saint Francis and Bonaventure's vision, 100/10, October

==== New Blackfriars ====
1974 The Italian Devils of Anglo-Saxon Literature, February

1974 The Myth and Dream of Paradise, November

1984 The Sense of an Ending, January

1984 Mark's Story of the Death of Jesus, March

1987 Three Versions of Life: the pastoral, tragic and melodramatic, September

1991 The Greatest Christian Hero, Philosopher and Poet: Dawson's Italian Trinity, June

1992 Columbus was not Eichmann, March

1992 Icons and Glory, May

1993 Scripture for Christian Conversion, January

1993 Opera: The Creative Expression of Italy, September

1994 Pre-Renaissance Tuscan and Franciscan Humanism, May

1994 Siena Icon of the Common Good: Lorenzetti and Lonergan, October

1996 American Art Cultural Crisis, April

1999 Italy in the High Middle Ages ll50 - 1309, May

2003 No tradition, no civilization, February

2004 Divine and Human Hospitality, May

2006 Are There Any Catholic Theologians?. January

==== America ====
1954 West Germany Acts to Save Families (Oct. 2)

1955 Colonial Peoples Come of Age (Jan. 29)

1956 Southern Italy: Land Reborn (Jan. l)

1956 Southern Italy: Mission Country? (Oct. 27)

1960 Canada's Immigration Problems (April 23)

1962 Teenagers and the Unknown God (June 30)

1964 Noonday Land (Jan. 11)

1972 Italian Politics: More Parties than People? (Mar. 18)

1972 Italy—An Environmental Disaster Area? (June 3)

1973 How Italian View Religion (April 23)

1989 Italy's Re-Renaissance (Dec. 1989)

1991 Fortress Europe Faces Immigrants (Dec. 7)

==== Priests & People ====
1988 The Real Self in Communion (Sept. 2/7)

1989 The Gospel Norm of True Love (July/Aug. 3/7)

1990 Divine and Human Conflict (March 4/3)

==== Commonweal ====
1960 The Two Italies (Nov.18)

1963 Fellini's La Dolce Italia (Mar.15)

1972 Italy: Can Democracy Survive? (Jan.7)

1973 The Monk as Criminal (July 27)

1974 The Next Conclave (June 14)

==== Milltown Studies (published by the Milltown Institute(Dublin)) ====
1984 Towards a Theology of Story (13, Spring)

1985 Narrative Theology: One Approach (16, Autumn)

1986 The Dynamic of the Question (17, Spring)

1991 Glenn Tinder's Prophetic Spirituality (28,)

1995 Siena's Saints of Civility (36, Autumn)

1996 John Edwards' Theology of Beauty (38, Autumn)

2005 The Sending of the Spirit (55, Summer)

==== Theology (London) ====
1977 A Theology of Darkness, Terror and Dread (September)

1987 The Question-Raising Word of God (July)

1988 The Last Day and the Last Supper in Mark's Gospel (January)

==== The Irish Theological Quarterly ====
(The Irish Theological Quarterly is published by Maynooth College)

1976 The Christ Story of the Christ-Self (XLIII/3)

1986 Narrative Theology: A Survey (52/3)

==== Journal of Dharma ====
1984 The Sacramental Dimension of the Recital of the Community's Faith (IX/3)

1987 The Dynamics of the Question in the Quest for God (XII/3)

==== Scripture: The Quarterly of the Catholic Biblical Association ====
1968 The Way of the Lord (January, XX/49)

1968 Lucan Joy (Feb. XX/50)

1968 The Temptation Account in St. Luke (4, 1–13) (March, XX/51)

1968 The Holy Spirit (April, XX/52)

1968 Prayer (October, XX/52)

==== The Way ====
1973 Dimensions of Creative Solitude (Supplement 18, Spring)

1975 Possession and Exorcism (July)

==== Studies in Formative Spirituality: Journal of Ongoing Formation ====
1985 Love: Remembering to Share Our Story of God (Feb. VI/1)

1990 Heroes, Saints and Leaders: Models for Human Development (Feb. XI/1)

1991 The Transforming Power of Beauty (Feb. XII/1)

1992 The Conversion Dynamic of Biblical Themes (Nov. XIII/3)

==== Worship ====
1966 Love in the Message of Paul (Aug./Sept. 40/7)

1968 "Glory" in Pauline and Johannine Thought (Jan. 41/1)

1969 Remembering and Worship (Nov. 43/9)

==== Faith and Freedom: A Journal of Progressive Religion ====
1973 Tale of Two Cities (Autumn 27/79)

1974 Italian Devils as Symbols of Evil in English Literature (Summer, 27/81)

1975 The Archetypal Symbol and Christotheraphy (Part 1) (Summer 28/84)

1975 The Archetypal Symbol and Christotheraphy (Part 2) (Autumn 29/85)

2014 The Refreshing Spirit of Pope Francis (Spring and Summer 67/178)

2014 Failure (Spring and Summer 67/178)

==== Concilium ====
1974 Evil and its Symbols (Feb. 2/10)

==== 20th Century: An Australian Review ====
1974 The Town in American Literature (Winter 28/2)

1974 Italian Devils of Anglo-Saxon Literature (March 28/3)

1975 Where Have All the Heroes Gone? (May)

==== Scottish Journal of Theology ====
1976 The Gospel Truth as Re-Enactment (July–August XLIII/3)

==== Chicago Studies ====
1976 Personal Transformation Through the Communication of the Christ-Self (Summer 15/2)

==== Religion in Life ====
1976 Salvation is Healing Through Enlightenment (Autumn XLV)

==== The Clergy Review ====
1976 Christotherapy: Healing Through Enlightenment (LXI/ 1)

==== Faith ====
2001 Beauty as an approach to God (March–April, 33/2)

2002 The Resurrection (March–April, 34/2)

2003 Patriarchs of Faith, Hope and Love (Jan.- Feb., 35/1)

2003 Grief and Grieving (May–June, 35/3)

2004 The Passion and Death of Jesus in John's Gospel (March–April, 36/2

==== The Catholic World ====
1965 "Letter from Ireland," March

1966 "Memories make the future," December

==== Review for Religious ====
1962 "The Humanity of Christ in St. Mark," July

1963 "Jeremiah: Man of God," March

1965 "God's Gifts to Our Old Testament Fathers," May

1975 "The Search for the Self: The Christ-self and the Christ-figures," 34/1, Jan.

1976 "Openness Communicating the Vision of God," 35/4, July

1979 "Write a Gospel," 38/5, Sept.

1980 "Four Gospels: Four Stages of Christian Maturation,"39/4, July

1981 "Bipolarities in Conversion," 40/3, May/June

1982 "Conversion Expressed in Dialogue and Story," 41/5, Sept./Oct.

1983 "Conversion and Conflict," 42/2, March/April

1984 "Tell the Story of the Lord and His People,"43/5, Sept./Oct.

1985 "Christian Conversion: Suffering Out of Love," 44/1, Jan./Feb.

1986 "The Dynamic of the Question in the Search for God," 45/6, Nov./Dec.

1991 "In a Glass Darkly: The Awareness of God," 50/4, July/Aug.

==== Italian Journal ====
1991 "The Greatest Christian Hero, Philosopher, and Poet: Christopher Dawson's" Italian Trinity" V/3-4

1992 "Four Italian Boundary Stories," VI/1

1992 "The Italian 'Spirit of Place,'" VI/6

1993 "Pre-Renaissance Franciscan and Tuscan Humanism," VII/2-3

1993 "Opera: The Creative Expression of Italy," VII/6

1994 "The People and Landscapes of Italy," VIII/5-6

1995 "Eighteenth-Century Lucca: Model of Civility," IX/1

1995 "Two Exponents of the Integrating Spirit of Italy," IX/2

1995 "Six Regions with an Affinity to Italy," IX/3

2000 "Ascoli Piceno, Travertine Splendor," XVI/12

2003 "Civic Legacies of Medieval Italy," XVIII/19

2003 "The Integrating Dynamic of Italian Art," XIX/21

==== Studies in Religion / Sciences Religieuses ====
1975-76 "The myth and the dream of paradise," (5/2 fall / automne)

1976-77 "The divided self and its healing," (6/6 /fall / automne)

1990 "The Cost of Ongoing Christian Conversion" (46/2, Juin)

==== Esperienza e Spiritualita ====
Miscellanea in onore del R. P. Charles A. Bernard, S.J. a cura di Herbert Alphonso, S.J. (Roma: Ed. Pomel, 1995).

"Carlo Martini and the Gospel Matrix for Christian Formation in the Light of Lonergan's Conversion Theology," pp. 29 – 43.

==== The Month ====
1974 "The Acceptance of Differences," 7/11, November

1997 "Good and Bad Government," 30/3, March

1997 "A Lorenzetti Masterpiece," 30/10, October

1998 "Enjoying True Beauty," 31/3, March

1999 "Italy's pictorial culture 1300-1600," 32/2, February

2000 "Two pearls of Renaissance Italy," 33/2, February

2001 "Sano di Pietro," 34/2, February

==== Prayer and Service ====
1997 "The Patriarchs of Faith, Hope, Love," October–December

1998 "The Dynamic of Contemplation in the Synoptic Gospels," October–November

==== Revue de L'Universite D'Ottawa ====
1962 "Italian Writing Redisovered," 32/3, July–September

1963 "Reverence for the Individual as an Expression of the Divine Mind and Will," January

==== Philosophical Studies ====
1956 "The Division of Society According to Plato and Aristotle," Vol. VI, December

==== The Thomist Reader ====
1958 "Geopolitics and Aristotle"

==== Philosophy and Phenomenological Research ====
1956 "Sankara and the Vedic Tradition," XVII/2, December

1957 "Christianity and the Vedic Tradition," XVIII/2, December

==== The American Ecclesiastical Review ====
1962 "Vocations in Western Europe," CXLVII/5, November

1975 "Christian Responsibility for the Environment," 169/10, December

==== The Furrow ====
1975 "Satan Returns," 26/9, September

1978 "Christ, The Beatitude of God," 29/11, November

==== Cross and Crown ====
1977 "Christian Vision," 29/4, December

==== Spiritual life ====
1975 "Freedom and Transformation in Christ," 21/1, Spring

1976 "Theologian as Interpreter of Dreams," 22/2, Summer

==== Emmanuel ====
1962 "Saint Jerome on Priestly Duties," September

1963 "The Priest and His Friends," April

1966 "The Witness," July

==== Studies in Spirituality ====
2004 "The Value of Religious Art," 14

==== Contemporary Spirituality: Current Problems in Religious Life ====
1968 Robert W. Gleason, S.J., Editor (New York: The Macmillan Company, 1968. Chapter 11, "Reverence for the Individual as an Expression of the Divine Mind and Will," pp. 152–169.

==== Gregorianum ====
1970 "Ongoing Collaboration: The First International Lonergan Congress," 51/3

==== Studies: An Irish Quarterly Review ====
1975 "Symbols of Everyman's Odyssey," pp. 258–68, Autumn

==== Biblical Theology Bulletin ====
1972 "Three Aspects of the Lucan Theology of History," pp. 115–132, Autumn

==== Pagina Uno ====
2006 "Lucca's Four Foremost Composers: The Sound of Lucca," pp. 12–13, 8/6, March

==== The Pastoral Review ====
2007 "The Uniqueness of Jesus," p. 13, May/June

2007 "Christ's Saving Grace,' pp. 16–17, September/October

2007 "Sharing the Love of Jesus," p. 65, November/December

2008 "Write a Gospel," pp. 13–16, March/April

==== Life ====
1989 "Who the Devil Is" June

==== International Herald Tribune ====
1992 "Italy: Getting Ahead in Life By the Coloratura Principle" May 21

1994 "The Geography of Nowhere Has a Chianti Counterpart" March 8

==== Parabola ====
1988 "The Question-Raising Word of God", pp. 40–43. Fall

=== Articles in Languages other than English ===
In addition to the articles listed below, Father Navone has written a number of articles published in L'Osservatore Romano, the Vatican City newspaper.

==== Il Dizionario di Omiletica ====
(The Dictionary of Homiletics)

1998 (reprinted 2002) Ed. Sodi, Manilio. La teologia narrative in Il Dizionario di Omiletia. Bergano: Elle Di Ci-Velar, Leumann

==== La Civilta' Cattolica ====
1987 L'io reale nella comunione dell'amore trinitario, 138/3282, 534–547.

1987 Eroi, modelli, santi e "leader," 138/3298, 340–352.

1988 Tre interpretazioni della vita: bucolica, tragica e melodrammatica, 139/3324, 545–558.

1989 L'ultima cena nel Vangelo di Marco, 139/3307, 13–19.

1990 Il paradosso della Chiesa nel mondo, 141/33358, 350–358.

1990 Spiritualitá degli itinerari biblici, 141/3363/3364, 238–247.

1991 Il mistero di Dio interpella l'uomo, 142/3373, 23–32.

1992 Tendenze religiose in USA, 143/3401, 453–457.

1994 Il ciclo di dipinti del Lorenzetti nel Municipio di Siena e la dimension sociale del cristianesimo, 145/3453, 249–259.

1995 La crsisi culturale negli Stati Uniti, 146/3485, 371–384.

1998 Genova nella storia dell'Europa, 149/3545, 361–374.

1999 La matrice evangelica della formazione cristiana, 150/3572, 162–169.

1999 Quale cultura religiosa negli Stati Uniti?, 150/3581, 380–392.

2002 Il valore dell'arte cristiana, 153/3645, 255–264.

2005 La politica estera degli Stati Uniti secondo Z. Brzezinski, 156/3717, 258–269.

2008 Il nazionalismo e eccezionalismo americano, 159/3748, 349–362.

==== Rassegna di Teologia ====
1984 Ricordo di amore condiviso e raccontato (settembre- ottobre XXV/5)

1985 Teologia narrativa: una rassegna delle sue applicazioni (sett-ott. XXVI/5)

2001 Il pelligrinaggio alla montagna di Dio (marzo-aprile XLII/2)

2002 Il mistero pasquale (marzo-aprile, XLIII/2)

2003 La scrittura per la conversione cristiana (marzo-aprile XLIV/2)

2004 Le parabole di Gesú (novembre-dicembre XLV/4)

2006 Ospitalita e accoglienza: L'invito di Dio all'uomo (magio-giugno XLVII/3)

==== Citta' di Vita ====
1991 Koinonia e iconografia scritturistica (lettura) (Marzo-Aprile 46/2)

1991 Il ricordarsi divino e umano (lettura) (Maggio-Giugno 46/3)

==== Vita Consecrata ====
1995 Aspetti dell'esperienza religiosa cristiana (31/2).

==== Salesianum ====
1987 Il modello di teologia narrativa narrato (Oct. - Nov. XLIX/4)

==== Ricerche Theologiche ====
1994 Santi Senesi e civilitá (V/2)

1995 La teologia della bellezza in Jonathan Edwards (1703–1758), (VI/2)

==== Nuovo Dizionario di Spiritualita ====
1968 "Diavolo/Esorcismo" pp. 401 – 418

1968 "Tentazione" pp. 1583–1597

==== Broteria (Portugal) ====
1992 Colombo descoberto pe la bibliografia recente (Aug/Sept.)

1993 Conversao e tema biblicos (May/June)

1995 Impacto cultural del S. Francisco (Oct.)

1996 A Crise Cultural Americana (Jan.)

1996 A Teologia do Belo segundo Jonathan Edwards (Mar).

1996 A festa em Josef Pieper (Jan.)

1996 O povo e as Paisagengs da Itália (April)

1996 Carlo Martini e a Formacao Crista (Dec.)

1997 A cultura pictórica da Italia (Mar/April)

1998 A Italia na Alta Idade Media (May/June)

1998 Génova, gonzo da Europa (Sept/Oct)

1999 Saboreando a verdadeira beleza (July/Aug.)

2000 Trinidade e pessoa humana (April)

2000 A guerra Americana da cultura (Aug/Sept.)

2000 Critica da cultura Americana (Oct.)

2000 Legados civicos da Itália Medieval (Nov.)

2001 Consumismo e declínio cultural (Nov.)

2002 Religiao e politica na América (Feb.)

2002 Beleza para chegar a Deus (May/June)

2003 Character unico de Jesus Cristo (Oct.)

==== Estudios (Argentina) ====
1956 La Iglesia en los EE. UU. XLVI/475 Junio

==== Catholica (France) ====
1989 Deux incursions sur le territorire litteraire americain, avril-mai

1990 L'echec dans le theatre contemporain, fevrier

1991 Les bons e le mechant, avril
