= Spanish ship Santa Ana =

Spanish ship Santa Ana may refer to the following ships:

- Santa Ana, launched in 1668
- Santa Ana, 70 guns, completed in 1729, stricken 1745
- Santa Ana, 112-gun ship of the line launched in 1784, participated in the Battle of Trafalgar

== See also ==
- Santa Ana (disambiguation)
- List of ships of the line of Spain
