= Puget Sound Community School =

Location
- 47°35′47″N 122°19′27″W

Information
- School type: 501(c)(3) non-profit organization, Private
- Established: 1994
- Founders: Andy Smallman, Melinda Shaw
- Teaching staff: 9
- Grades: 6–12
- Communities served: Chinatown
- Website: pscs.org

Puget Sound Community School (PSCS) is a small, independent, secular middle and high school in the Chinatown neighborhood of the International District in Seattle, Washington. It was founded in 1994 by Andy Smallman and Melinda Shaw, who both have since retired. PSCS is run by 3 collaborative administrative directors, Valerie Diaz Leroy, Tim Ichien, and Sieglinde Levery-Nicholas.

PSCS was highlighted in the November, 2025 issue of in an article entitled Rigorous Engagement.

The New York Times featured PSCS as a pioneer in gender-neutral bathrooms in a 2017 article about non-binary youth.

Author Daniel Pink mentioned the school in his 2009 book Drive, noting that the school "gives its students a radical dose of autonomy, turning the 'one size fits all' approach of conventional schools on its head. Each student has an adviser who acts as her personal coach, helping her come up with her own learning goals" and comparing it to Sudbury Valley School and Dennis Littky's Big Picture School.

In 2009, the Seattle Times featured the school in its article "Kindness Taught in Seattle School’s Online Class."
