= Lac Ste. Anne =

Lac Ste. Anne, Ste Anne des Lacs, or Sainte Anne du Lac may refer to:

== Lac Sainte Anne ==
=== Canada ===
- Lac Ste. Anne (Alberta), a lake in Canada
- Lac Ste. Anne, Alberta, a settlement and pilgrimage site on the shore of the lake
- Lac Ste. Anne County, a municipal district surrounding the lake in Alberta
- Lac Ste. Anne (electoral district), an Alberta provincial electoral district from 1909 to 1971
- Lac Ste. Anne No. 93, Alberta, a former municipality now in Sturgeon County, Alberta
- Lake Sainte-Anne (Toulnustouc) (French: Lac Sainte-Anne), a reservoir on the Toulnustouc River in the territory of Côte-Nord, Quebec
- Lac Sainte-Anne (Lac-Croche), lake in La Jacques-Cartier, Capitale-Nationale, Quebec
- Petit-Lac-Sainte-Anne, Quebec, an unorganized territory in Kamouraska Regional County Municipality, Bas-Saint-Laurent, Quebec
- Lac Sainte-Anne du Nord, a lake in Grands-Jardins National Park, in Lac-Pikauba, Quebec

== Sainte Anne des Lacs ==
- Sainte-Anne-des-Lacs, a municipality in Les Pays-d'en-Haut, Quebec, Canada
- Sainte-Anne-du-Lac, a municipality in the Laurentides region of Quebec, Canada
  - Sainte-Anne-du-Lac (Aviation PLMG Inc.) Aerodrome
  - Sainte-Anne-du-Lac Water Aerodrome
- Sainte-Anne-du-Lac, Adstock, a former municipality now in Adstock, Quebec, Canada
- Ste Anne des Lacs, a shrine in Florida, United States

== See also ==
- Lake Sfânta Ana (Saint Anne's Lake), Romania
- Sainte Anne
