= Saint Anne's School =

Saint Anne's School may refer to:

== India ==
- St. Anne's High School, Fort, Mumbai
- St. Anne's High School, Orlem, Mumbai
- St. Anne's School (Pune)
- St. Anne's School, Jodhpur
- St. Ann's High School, Secunderabad

== Malaysia ==
- St. Anne's Primary School, Sarikei, Sarawak
- St. Anne's Secondary School, Victoria, Labuan
- St. Anne's Convent Secondary School, Kulim, Kedah

== Republic of Ireland ==
- St. Anne's Primary School, Fettercairn, Tallaght, Dublin 24
- St. Anne's Secondary School, Milltown, Dublin 6
- St. Anne's Community College, Killaloe, County Clare
- Industrial Schools in Ireland
  - St. Ann’s Industrial School for Girls and Junior Boys, Renmore, Lenaboy, County Galway
  - St. Ann's Industrial School for Girls, Killarney, County Kerry
  - St. Anne’s Industrial School for Girls, Booterstown, County Dublin
  - St. Anne’s Reformatory School for Girls, Kilmacud, County Dublin

== United Kingdom ==
- St. Anne's Catholic School (Southampton), England
- St Anne's Catholic High School, London, England
- St Anne's RC Voluntary Academy, Stockport, England
- St Anne's Primary School, Belfast, Northern Ireland
- St Anne's Roman Catholic Primary School, Caversham, Reading, Berkshire, United Kingdom

== United States ==
- St. Anne's School, (Barrington, Illinois)
- Saint Ann's School (Brooklyn)
- St. Anne School (Fair Lawn, New Jersey)
- St. Anne School (Laguna Niguel, California)
- St. Anne School (Seattle, Washington)
- St. Anne‒Pacelli Catholic School, Columbus, Georgia
- St. Anne's School of Annapolis, Annapolis, Maryland
- St. Anne Catholic School (Houston, Texas), Houston, USA

== Elsewhere ==
- St Anne's Catholic School (Manurewa), Auckland, New Zealand
- St Anne's School (Woolston), Christchurch, New Zealand
- St. Anne School (Saskatoon), Saskatchewan, Canada
- The Cathedral School, Townsville (The Cathedral School of St Anne and St James), Townsville, Queensland, Australia, formerly known as St. Anne's School
- St. Anne's Catholic Secondary School, Clinton, Ontario, Canada
- St. Anne's School, Nassau, Bahamas
