= Santa Ana winds (disambiguation) =

Santa Ana winds are strong seasonal winds in Southern California, US, and northern Baja California, Mexico.

Santa Ana Wind(s) or Santa Anna Winds may also refer to:

== Music ==
- Santa Ana Wind (song), 2012 song by Everclear
- Santa Ana Winds (song), 1980 song by The Beach Boys
- Santa Ana Winds (album), 1984 album by Steve Goodman
- "Santa Ana Winds", a song by Survivor on the 1983 album Caught in the Game
- Santa Anna Winds, a song on the 1981 Outpost album by Freddie Hubbard

== Other uses ==
- Santa Ana Winds FC, a soccer team in the United Premier Soccer League

== See also ==
- Santa Ana (disambiguation)
- Santa Anna (disambiguation)
- Santana (disambiguation)
