= Crowd Control (2014 TV series) =

- Genre: Reality television
- Starring: Daniel Pink as well as Thomas Kettle Episode 9
- Country of origin: United States
- Original language: English
- No. of seasons: 1
- No. of episodes: 12

Production
- Executive producers: Belinda Cherrington; Dick Colthurst; Madeleine Carter
- Camera setup: Multiple
- Running time: 30 minutes (with ads)
- Production company: Tigress Productions

Original release
- Network: National Geographic Channel
- Release: November 24 – December 15, 2014

Crowd Control is an American reality documentary television series on National Geographic Channel that premiered on November 24, 2014. The series, hosted by Daniel Pink, sets up a series of practical experiments in an attempt to change social behaviour.

== Episodes ==
No.	Title	Original release date
1	"Lawbreakers"	November 24, 2014
2	"Lazy Nation"	November 24, 2014
3	"Travel Tricks"	December 1, 2014
4	"Anger Management"	December 1, 2014
5	"Dirty Deeds"	December 8, 2014
6	"Money"	December 8, 2014
7	"Selfishness"	December 8, 2014
8	"Feet First"	December 8, 2014
9	"Time Flies"	December 15, 2014
10	"Food For Thought"	December 15, 2014
11	"Do The Right Thing"	December 15, 2014
12	"Top Takeaways"	December 15, 2014
