= Education in Seattle =

Schooling in Seattle, Washington, USA

Education in Seattle is an important part of many Seattleites' lives, particularly due to the high concentration of technology, engineering, and other jobs that require advanced degrees. Of the city's population over the age of 25, 53.8 percent (vs. a national average of 27.4 percent) hold a bachelor's degree or higher; 91.9 percent (vs. 84.5 percent nationally) have a high school diploma or equivalent. In fact, the United States Census Bureau surveys indicate that Seattle has one of the highest rates of college graduates among major U.S. cities. In addition to the obvious institutions of education, there are significant adult literacy programs and considerable homeschooling. Seattle is also the most literate city in the United States, based on a study done by Central Connecticut State University.

== Colleges and universities ==
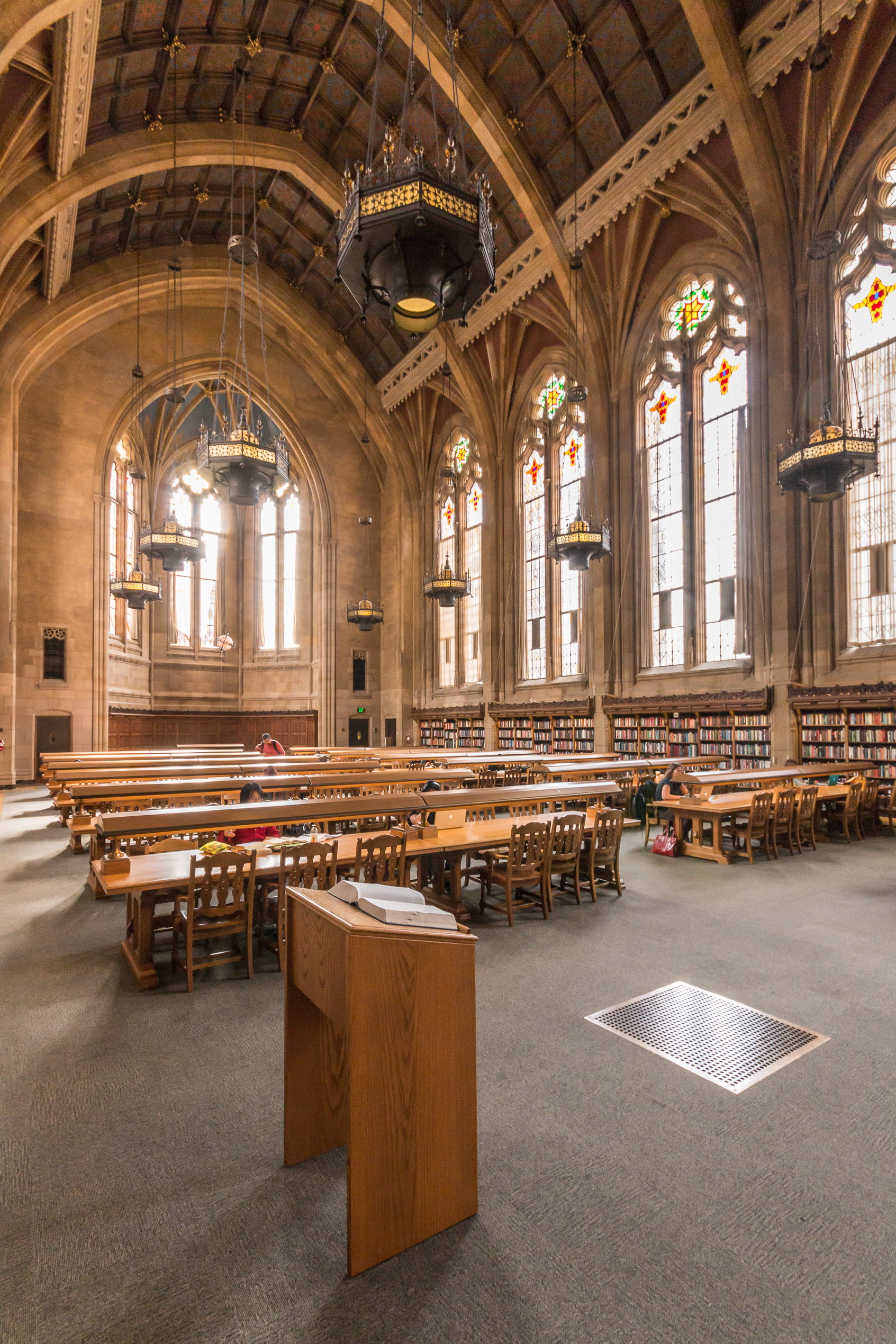
Inside Suzzallo Library, University of Washington campus

Seattle is home to one of the nation's most respected public universities, the University of Washington. With over 40,000 under-graduates and post-graduates, UW is the largest school in the Pacific Northwest and many of its departments are ranked in the top 10 for research universities in the United States according to the Chronicle of Higher Learning. A study by Newsweek International in 2006 cited UW as the twenty-second best university in the world. Additionally, the University of Washington was ranked 16th internationally by the Academic Ranking of World Universities in 2008.

The city's other prominent universities are Seattle University, a Jesuit university, and Seattle Pacific University, a Free Methodist university.

There are also a handful of smaller schools, such as the City University of Seattle, a private university. Antioch University Seattle provide undergraduate and graduate degrees for working adults. Cornish College of the Arts, The Art Institute of Seattle, Gage Academy of Art and the School of Visual Concepts offer bachelor's degrees in the fine arts as dance, music, and theatre. Seattle also has three colleges within the Seattle Colleges District system, comprising North, Central, and South. Time magazine chose Seattle Central College for best college of the year in 2001, stating the school "pushes diverse students to work together in small teams".

Since 2013, Northeastern University has a satellite graduate campus in the South Lake Union neighborhood.

== Primary and secondary education ==
Seattle Public Schools is the school district for the vast majority of the city. It desegregated without a court order but continue to struggle to achieve racial balance in a somewhat ethnically divided city (the south part of town having more ethnic minorities than the north). In 2006, a challenge to Seattle's racial tie-breaking system made it to the United States Supreme Court. Where the Supreme Court decided that race was not a legal criterion for desegregation, but left the door open for desegregation formulas based on other indicators (e.g., income or socio-economic class). And in 2002, West Seattle's West Seattle High School made headlines in the midst of protests of the school's "Indian" mascot. Despite bitter battles between SPS and Alumni Association President and Attorney Robert Zoffel, the school would later change its mascot to the "Wildcats".

A small section of the city is in the Highline School District.

=== Public Schools ===
Most public schools in Seattle are part of the Seattle School District, but a few in the southern portion of the city are part of the Renton School District.

- Seattle Public Schools: High Schools
- Seattle Public Schools: K-12
- Seattle Public Schools: Middle Schools
- Seattle Public Schools: K-8
- Seattle Public School: Elementary Schools

=== Private Secondary Schools ===
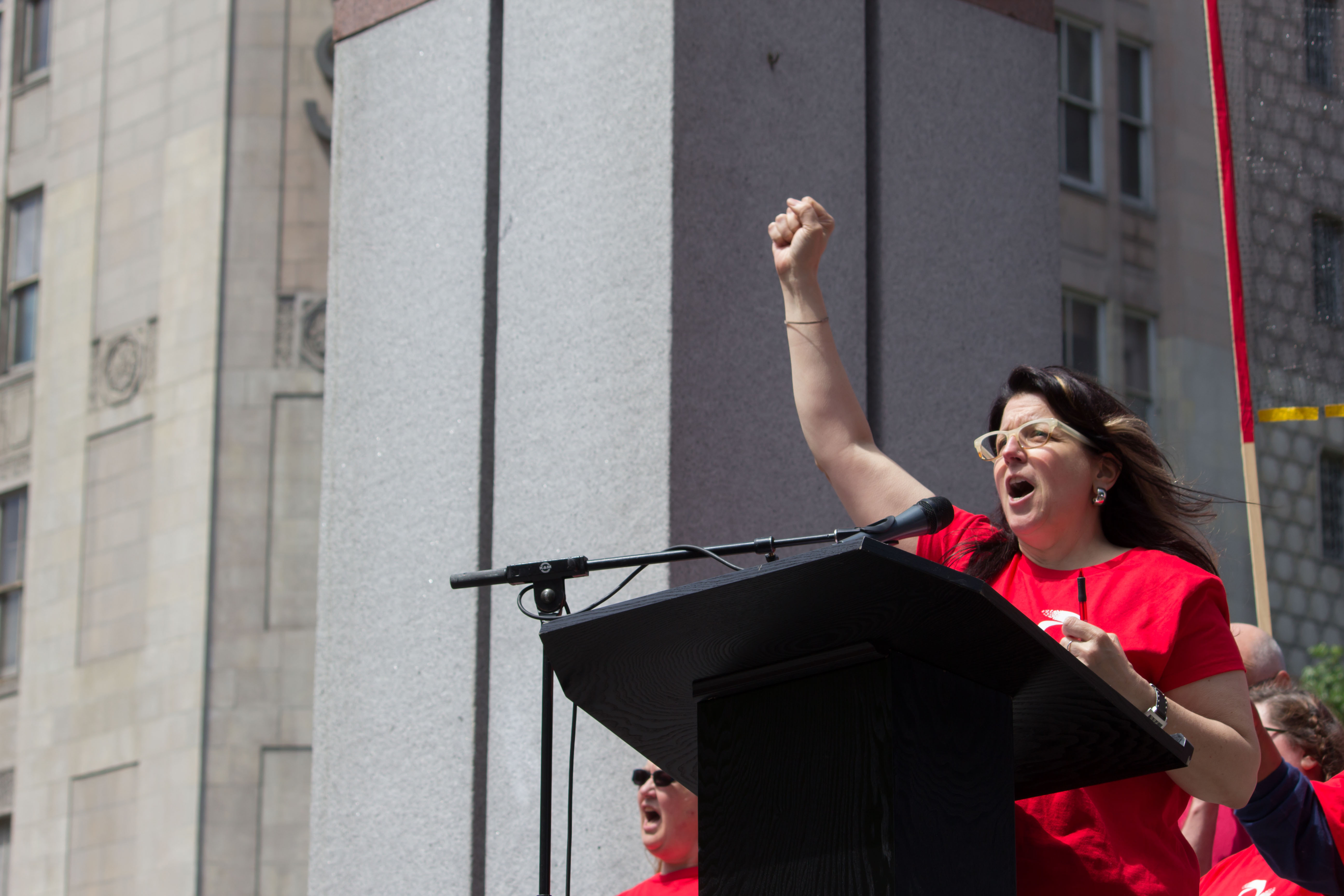
Rally for Education Funding IN Seattle in 2017

The public school system is supplemented by a moderate number of private schools: five of the high schools are Catholic, one is Lutheran, and seven are secular.

- Bishop Blanchet High School
- Holy Names Academy
- O'Dea High School
- Seattle Preparatory School
- Seattle Lutheran High School
- The Bush School
- Lakeside School
- Seattle Waldorf School
- Northwest School
- Seattle Academy of Arts and Sciences
- University Prep
- Dartmoor School
- Puget Sound Community School

== Weekend education ==
The Seattle Japanese School, a Japanese weekend supplementary school, holds its classes in nearby Bellevue.

== Archives ==
- Seattle Education Association records. 1958-1985 2.00 cubic feet. At the University of Washington Libraries Special Collections.
- Seattle Teachers' Association records. 1958-1969. 16 boxes. At the University of Washington Libraries Special Collections.
