= St. Anne's College =

St. Anne's College may refer to:

- St Anne's College, Leuven
- St Anne's College, Oxford
- St. Anne's College (Sri Lanka)
- St Ann's College, Australia
- Collège Sainte-Anne in Quebec, Canada
- Collège Sainte-Anne, the former name of Université Sainte-Anne in Nova Scotia, Canada
