= Dartmoor School =

Independent school in the Puget Sound region

- Washington; United States

Information
- Type: Private, independent
- Established: 1990
- Locale: Suburban
- Faculty: 30
- Grades: 1-12
- Enrollment: 75-120
- Website: www.dartmoorschool.org

Dartmoor School is a small independent school, offering one-to-one education at four campuses in the Puget Sound region (Bellevue, Issaquah, Seattle and Bothell). Founded in 1990 by reading specialist Doris J. Bower, Dartmoor began as a reading intervention school. Mrs. Bower saw a need for alternative approaches to education. She started Dartmoor School to ensure success for all types of learners by developing a one-to-one model of instruction.

Demand for credit courses and the desire to graduate from Dartmoor increased, prompting Dartmoor's accreditation and, ultimately, its transformation from a learning center into an independent school in the early 1990s.
