= List of rivers named Sainte-Anne =

There are many rivers in the province of Quebec, Canada, with similar names:

- Sainte-Anne River, tributary of St. Lawrence in province of Quebec, which flows Sainte-Anne-de-la-Pérade. This river is well known for its ice fishing. MRC Les Chenaux, Mauricie, 46° 33'13", 72° 12' 22", Select 56008 31I/09-0102 .
- Arm Rivière Sainte-Anne, Saint-Raymond (City), Portneuf Regional County Municipality, Capitale-Nationale, 46° 53' 13", 71° 51' 21", Select 56016 21L/13-0201
- Rivière Sainte-Anne-du-Nord, tributary of St. Lawrence, in province of Quebec, which flows in Beaupré.
- Sainte-Anne River (Bas-Saint-Laurent), tributary of St. Lawrence, in Quebec, which flows through Rimouski, in the area of Pointe-au-Père. It crosses from east to west the National Wildlife Pointe-au-Père MRC Rimouski-Neigette, Bas-Saint-Laurent, 48° 30' 49", 68° 27' 54", Select 92064 22C/09-0101
- Sainte-Anne Little River, Sainte-Anne-des-Monts (City), MRC of La Haute-Gaspésie, Gaspésie–Îles-de-la-Madeleine, 49° 07' 49", 66° 28' 38", Select 56019 22G/01-0201
- Rivière Sainte-Anne Sainte-Anne-des-Monts (City), MRC de La Haute-Gaspésie, Gaspésie–Îles-de-la-Madeleine, 49° 07'33", 66° 30' 19", Select 56012 22G/02-0202
- Rivière Sainte-Anne La Pocatière (Municipality), MRC Kamouraska, Bas-Saint-Laurent, 47° 15' 30", 69° 53' 23", Select 56010 21N/05-0101
- Rivière Sainte-Anne, Beaupre (City), MRC La Côte-de-Beaupré, Capitale-Nationale, 47° 02' 20", 70° 53' 00", Select 109029 21M/02-0101
- Rivière Sainte-Anne, Anticosti Island (Municipality), MRC Mingan, Côte-Nord, 49° 38' 12", 63° 49' 30", Select 56013 12E/12-0201
- Rivière Sainte-Anne-des-Monts, a name changed to: Rivière Sainte-Anne Sainte-Anne-des-Monts (City), MRC High-Gaspésie, Gaspésie–Îles-de-la-Madeleine, 49° 07' 33", 66° 30' 19", Select 56040 22G/02-0202
- Sainte-Anne River North, replaced by Rivière Sainte-Anne, Beaupre (City), MRC La Côte-de-Beaupré, Capitale-Nationale, 47° 02' 20", 70° 53' 00", Select 109030 21M/02-0101

Other names using "River Sainte-Anne"

- First rank North River St. Anne, Sainte-Anne-de-la-Joliette (Municipality), MRC Les Chenaux, Mauricie, 46° 35' 00", 72° 12' 00", Select 96297 31I/09-0102
- Chemin de la Rivière-Sainte-Anne, a name changed to: Chemin Sainte-Anne, Saint-Alban (Municipality), Portneuf Regional County Municipality, Capitale-Nationale, 46° 43' 00", 72° 05' 00", Select 93619 31I/09-0202
- Chemin de la Rivière-Sainte-Anne, Saint-Casimir (Municipality), Portneuf Regional County Municipality, Capitale-Nationale, 46° 39' 00", 72° 08' 00", Select 95240 31I/09-0102
- Former Forest River St. Anne, (Exceptional Forest Ecosystem), Beaupre (City), MRC La Côte-de-Beaupré, Capitale-Nationale, 47° 02' 45", 71° 40' 54", Select 398785 21M/04-0102
- Wildlife River St. Anne, Sainte-Anne-des-Monts (City), La Haute-Gaspésie, Gaspésie–Îles-de-la-Madeleine, 49° 05' 00", 66° 30' 00", Select 142109 22G/01-0102

== Réunion (Indian Ocean) ==
- Sainte-Anne River (La Réunion), rivers Réunion.
