= Daniel H. Pink =

American non-fiction writer (born 1964)

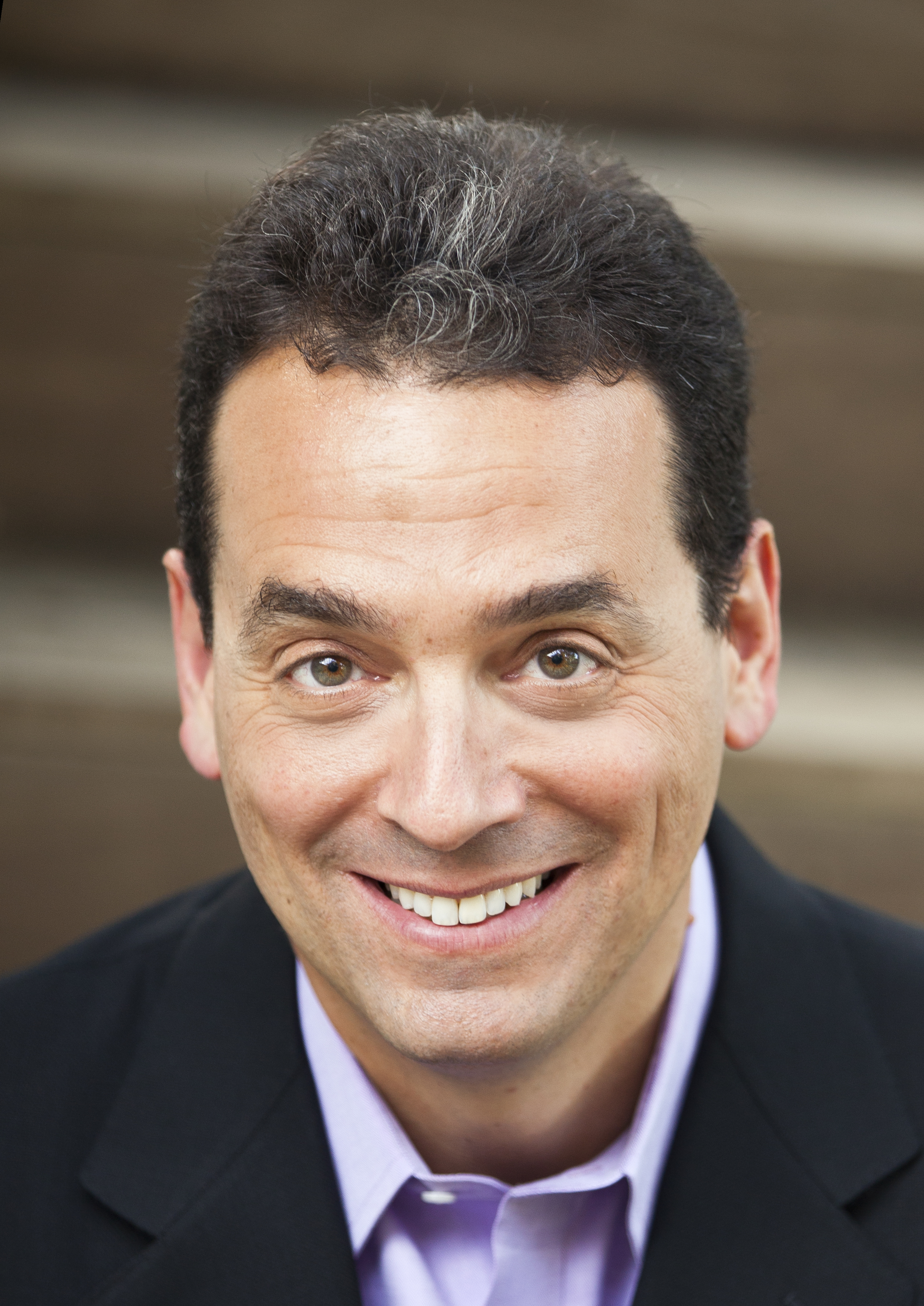
- Pink in 2018
- Born: July 23, 1964 (age 62)
- Education: Northwestern University (B.A.); Yale Law School (J.D.)
- Occupation: Author
- Spouse: Jessica Lerner
- Writing career
- Language: English
- Genre: Non-fiction
- Website: danpink.com

Daniel H. Pink (born July 23, 1964) is an American non-fiction writer who has authored seven New York Times bestsellers. He was host and a co-executive producer of the National Geographic Channel social science TV series Crowd Control. From 1995 to 1997, he was the chief speechwriter for Vice President Al Gore.

== Early life and education ==
Daniel Pink grew up in Columbus, Ohio, and graduated from Bexley High School. He went on to Northwestern University, where he was a Truman Scholar, graduating Phi Beta Kappa. He then earned a Juris Doctor degree from Yale Law School, where he was editor-in-chief of the Yale Law & Policy Review.

== Career ==
Upon graduating law school, Pink immediately began working in politics and economic policy. From 1993 to 1995, he was special assistant to Secretary of Labor Robert Reich. From 1995 to 1997, he worked as the chief speechwriter for Vice President Al Gore. In 1997 he quit his job going out on his own, an experience he described in the 1998 Fast Company article "Free Agent Nation" which became his first book.

== Television and video work ==
He was host and co-executive producer of the National Geographic Channel social science TV series Crowd Control. The program set up experiments around the U.S. in an attempt to change behavior.

== Personal life ==
Pink married Jessica Lerner, a lawyer and fellow Yale Law School grad, in 1995. They live in Washington D.C. with their children.

== Honors and awards ==
Pink has received honorary degrees from Georgetown University, Pratt Institute, Ringling College of Art and Design, the University of Indianapolis, and the Columbus College of Art and Design.

== Books ==
- Free Agent Nation: The Future of Working for Yourself. 2001. ISBN 978-0-446-67879-7.
- Pink, Daniel H. (2005). A Whole New Mind: Why Right-Brainers Will Rule the Future. Penguin. ISBN 978-1-59448-171-0. NYT Hardcover Nonfiction bestseller No. 12, December 28, 2008.
- Pink, Daniel H. (2008). The Adventures of Johnny Bunko: The Last Career Guide You'll Ever Need. Penguin. ISBN 978-1-59448-291-5.
- Pink, Daniel H. (2009). Drive: The Surprising Truth About What Motivates Us. National Geographic Books. ISBN 978-1-59448-884-9. NYT Hardcover Nonfiction bestseller No. 12, March 7, 2010.
- Pink, Daniel H. (2012). To Sell is Human: The Surprising Truth About Moving Others. Penguin. ISBN 978-1-59448-715-6. NYT Hardcover Nonfiction bestseller No. 8, February 10, 2013.
- Pink, Daniel H. (2018). When: The Scientific Secrets of Perfect Timing. Penguin. ISBN 978-0-73521-062-2. NYT Hardcover Nonfiction bestseller No. 2, January 28, 2018.
- The Power of Regret: How Looking Backward Moves Us Forward. Riverhead. 2022. ISBN 978-0-7352-1065-3. NYT Hardcover Nonfiction bestseller No. 3, February 20, 2022
