= Santa Ana, Jujuy =

Coordinates: 23°19′S 65°02′W

Santa Ana (Valle Grande)
- Municipality and town
- Interactive map of Santa Ana (Valle Grande)
- Country: Argentina
- Province: Jujuy Province
- Time zone: UTC−3 (ART)

Santa Ana (Valle Grande) is a town and municipality in Jujuy Province in Argentina.
