= St. Ann's Academy =

St. Ann's Academy may refer to:

- St. Ann's Academy in Manhattan, New York, now Archbishop Molloy High School
- St. Ann's Academy (Hornell, New York), an elementary school (including pre-K) in the Catholic tradition
- St. Ann's Academy (Kamloops), a Roman Catholic secondary school
- St. Ann's Academy (Victoria, British Columbia), a Roman Catholic secondary school

== See also ==
- St Anne's Academy
