= St. Anna (mission station) =

St. Anna was a Roman Catholic mission station during the German colonial period. It contained a plantation of coconut palm and rubber trees for export to Europe. It was located at Berlinhafen, Kaiser-Wilhelmsland (German New Guinea).

== Sources ==
- Averberg, Theodor: Skizzen und Bilder aus der Südsee-Mission - 3. Ein Besuch auf der Missionsfarm St. Anna, Steyler Missionsbote, 1908; 35: 90–92.
- Deutsches Kolonial-Lexikon (1920), Vol. III, p. 251
