= Drive: The Surprising Truth About What Motivates Us =

2009 book by Daniel Pink

- Hardcover edition
- Author: Daniel H. Pink
- Language: English
- Genre: Non-fiction
- Publisher: Riverhead Hardcover
- Publication date: December 29, 2009
- Publication place: United States
- Media type: Print (Hardback), E-book, Audiobook
- Pages: 256
- ISBN: 978-1594488849
- OCLC: 311778265

Drive: The Surprising Truth About What Motivates Us is a non-fiction book written by Daniel Pink. The book was published in 2009 by Riverhead Hardcover. It argues that human motivation is largely intrinsic and that the aspects of this motivation can be divided into autonomy, mastery, and purpose, while old models of motivation driven by rewards and fear of punishment, dominated by extrinsic factors such as money.

== Summary ==
The central claim of the book is that higher pay and bonuses result in better performance within the workplace only if tasks consist of basic mechanical skills. If the task involved cognitive skills, decision-making, creativity, or higher-order thinking, higher pay resulted in lower performance. Pink suggests, "You should pay enough to take the issue of money off the table". Much of the book is based on studies done at Massachusetts Institute of Technology (MIT) and other universities,

To motivate employees who work beyond basic tasks, Pink believes that supporting employees in the following areas will result in increased performance and satisfaction:

- Autonomy – A desire to be self directed, it increases engagement over compliance.
- Mastery – The urge to get better skilled.
- Purpose – The desire to do something that has meaning and is important. Businesses that only focus on profits without valuing purpose will end up with poor customer service and unhappy employees.

== Reception ==
Stefan Stern, writing for the Los Angeles Times, calls the book "short, punchy, energetic and not subtle", praising the writing, but simultaneously argues that Pink overstates his case. In The Guardian, William Leith identifies Drive as vying for attention "in the Gladwell market", but praises it for its "inspiring" message that views work as art as it inspires more than the "carrot-and-stick."
