= Lac Sainte-Anne (Lac-Croche) =

Lake in Lac-Croche, Quebec, Canada

- Location in Quebec
- Location: Lac-Croche (TNO), La Jacques-Cartier Regional County Municipality, Capitale-Nationale, Quebec, Canada
- Coordinates: 47.285°N 71.66°W
- Lake type: Natural
- Primary inflows: (clockwise from the mouth) Discharge of lakes Louise, Trépanier, Cuvette, La Saulx and Bastonis, discharge of lakes Émilie, Sioui, de la Spartine, Beauclair and Petit lac Beauclair, discharge of an unidentified lake.
- Primary outflows: Sainte-Anne River (Mauricie)
- Basin countries: Canada
- Max. length: 4.8 km (3.0 mi)
- Max. width: 0.5 km (0.31 mi)
- Surface area: 1.43 km^{2} (0.55 sq mi)
- Surface elevation: 656 m (2,152 ft)

The Lac Sainte-Anne (English: Sainte-Anne Lake) is a freshwater body at the head of the Sainte-Anne River in the unorganized territory of Lac-Croche, in the La Jacques-Cartier Regional County Municipality, in the administrative region of Capitale-Nationale, in the province from Quebec, to Canada. This body of water is located in the Laurentides Wildlife Reserve.

The area around the lake is served by the forest road R0300 which runs on the east side of the lake, and by another forest road from the south which connects to the first, south of the lake. These roads serve this area for the purposes of forestry and recreational tourism activities.

Forestry is the main economic activity in the sector; recreational tourism, second.

The surface of Lake Sainte-Anne is usually frozen from the beginning of December to the end of March, however the safe circulation on the ice is generally made from mid-December to mid-March.

== Geography ==
Lake Sainte-Anne has a length of 4.8 kilometres (3.0 mi), a width of 0.5 kilometres (0.31 mi) and its surface is at an altitude of 656 metres (2,152 ft). This lake deep in the mountains is long and has three small islands.

Lake Sainte-Anne supplies water through landfills:

- north side: the outlet of the lakes of Émilie, Sioui, de la Spartine, Beauclair and Petit lac Beauclair lakes;
- east side: the outlet of an unidentified lake;
- southwest side: the outlet of lakes Louise, Trépanier, Cuvette, La Saulx and Bastonis.

From the mouth of Lac Sainte-Anne, the current descends on following the course of the Sainte-Anne River (Mauricie) to the northeast shore of St. Lawrence River.

== Toponymy ==
The toponym Lac Sainte-Anne was formalized on December 5, 1968, by the Commission de toponymie du Québec.

== See also ==
- La Jacques-Cartier Regional County Municipality
- Lac-Croche, an unorganized territory
- Sainte-Anne River (Mauricie)
- St. Lawrence River
- List of lakes of Canada
