= St Anne's Hospital, Ripon =

Ruined hospital building in Ripon, England

Coordinates: 54°08′02″N 1°31′12″W

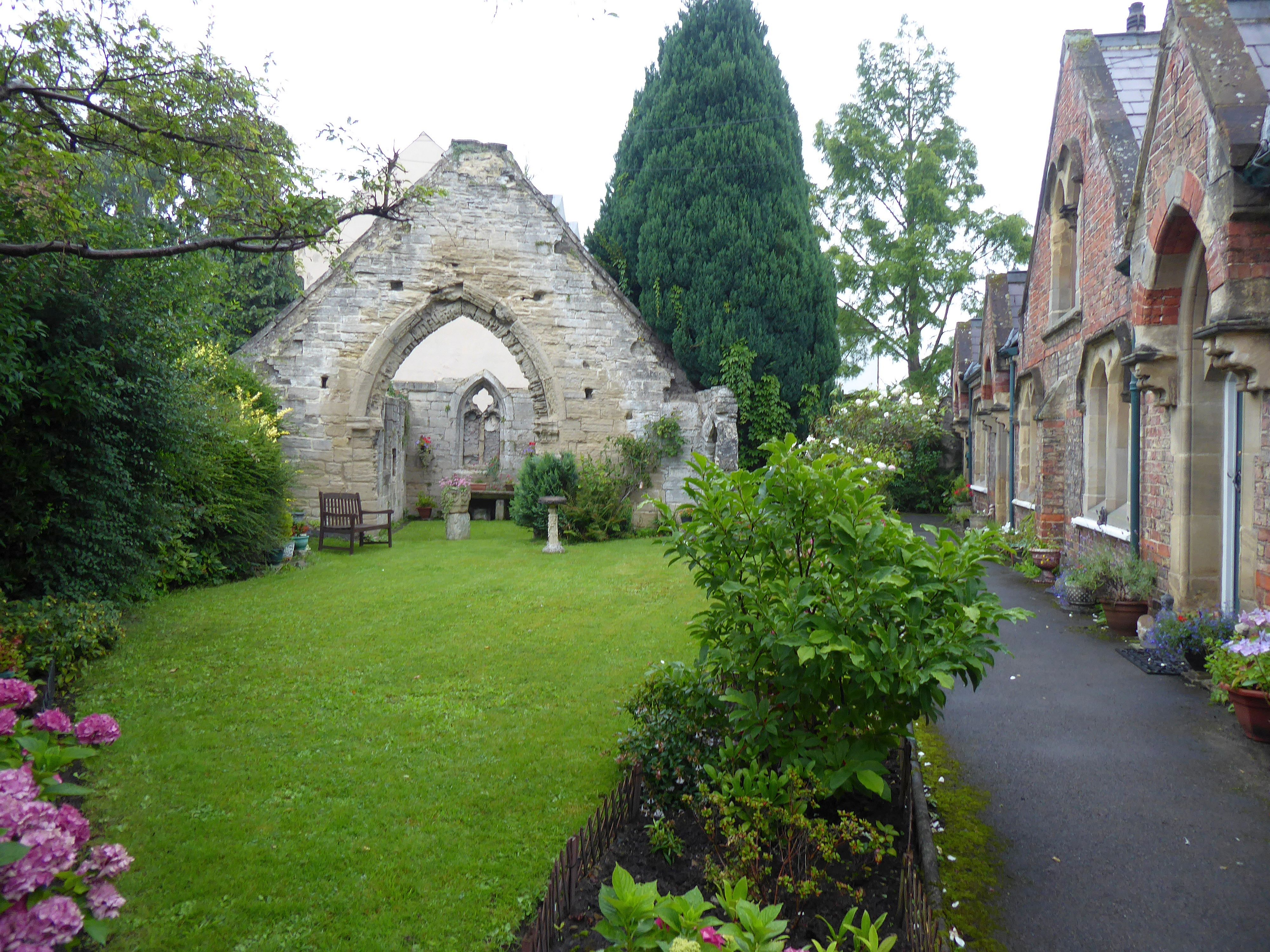
The ruined chapel, in 2019

St Anne's Hospital is a ruined historic building in Ripon, a city in North Yorkshire, in England.

The almshouse was first recorded in 1438, when a chantry chapel was added, but it was probably built in the 14th century. It provided accommodation for four men, four women, and two casual residents. There was a priest in charge, but the almshouse appears not to have had an endowment until 1680. At some point, the accommodation was divided into cottages, and was instead used to accommodate 16 women. In 1869, new almshouses were constructed at a cost of £858, and the residential section of the hospital was demolished. The chapel, already roofless, was left as a ruin, and was grade II* listed in 1949.

The ruins are built of limestone, with a chancel arch at the west end and a two-light Decorated window at the west end. Inside, there is a stone altar slab, a piscina and a stoup.

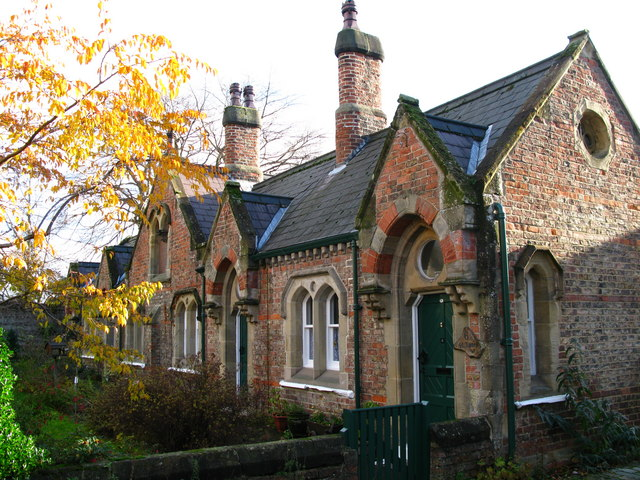
The almshouses

The almshouses are grade II listed. They are built of brown brick with stone dressings, pink brick string courses, and a slate roof. There is one storey and four bays. In the centre is a gable with two blind lights framing an inscribed marble panel. Each house has a doorway with a shouldered lintel and a circular fanlight, above which is a coped gable on paired cut corbels. The windows are paired pointed sashes with hood moulds.

== See also ==
- Grade II* listed buildings in North Yorkshire (district)
- Listed buildings in Ripon
- Media related to Chapel of St Anne's Hospital, Ripon at Wikimedia Commons
