= St Ann's Hospital, Dorset =

St Ann's Hospital
- Dorset HealthCare University NHS Foundation Trust
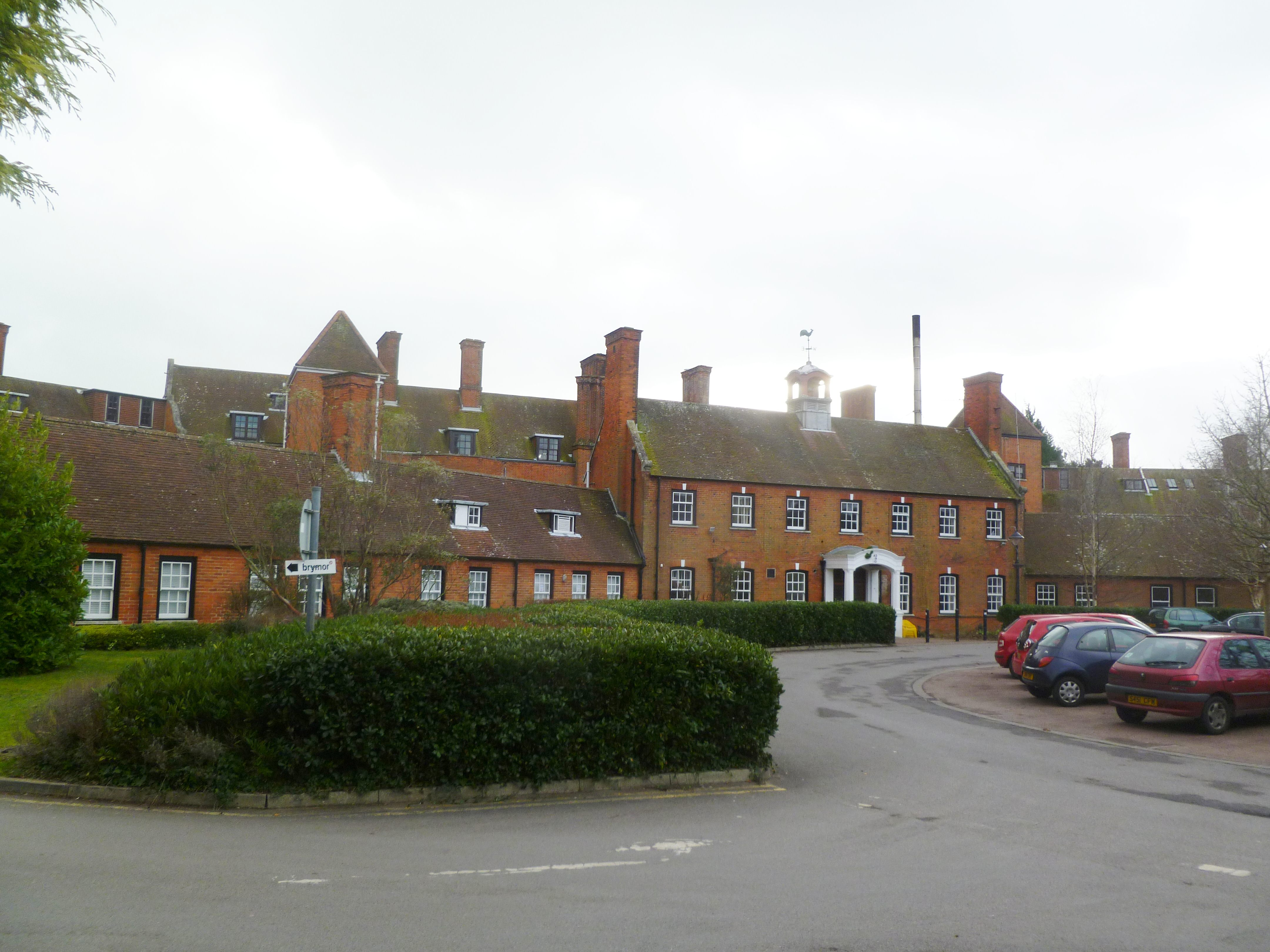
- St Ann's Hospital

- Shown in Dorset

Geography
- Location: Poole, Dorset, England, United Kingdom
- Coordinates: 50.700°N 1.928°W

Organisation
- Care system: NHS
- Type: Psychiatric Hospital
- Affiliated university: None

Services
- Emergency department: No Accident & Emergency
- Beds: 86

History
- Founded: 1912

Links
- Website: www.dorsethealthcare.nhs.uk
- Lists: Hospitals in England

St Ann's Hospital is a psychiatric hospital located in the Canford Cliffs area of Poole, Dorset. It is managed by Dorset HealthCare University NHS Foundation Trust. It is a Grade II* listed building.

== History ==
The hospital, which was designed by Robert Weir Schultz, was built between 1909 and 1912. A major expansion of the site involving the construction of a new ward block providing 30 extra beds at a cost of £14 million was completed in October 2013.

The Care Quality Commission reported that the hospital team had met all the necessary standards during an inspection in October 2013.

== See also ==
- Holloway Sanatorium
