= St. Anne's Convent School, Chandigarh =

St. Anne's Convent School
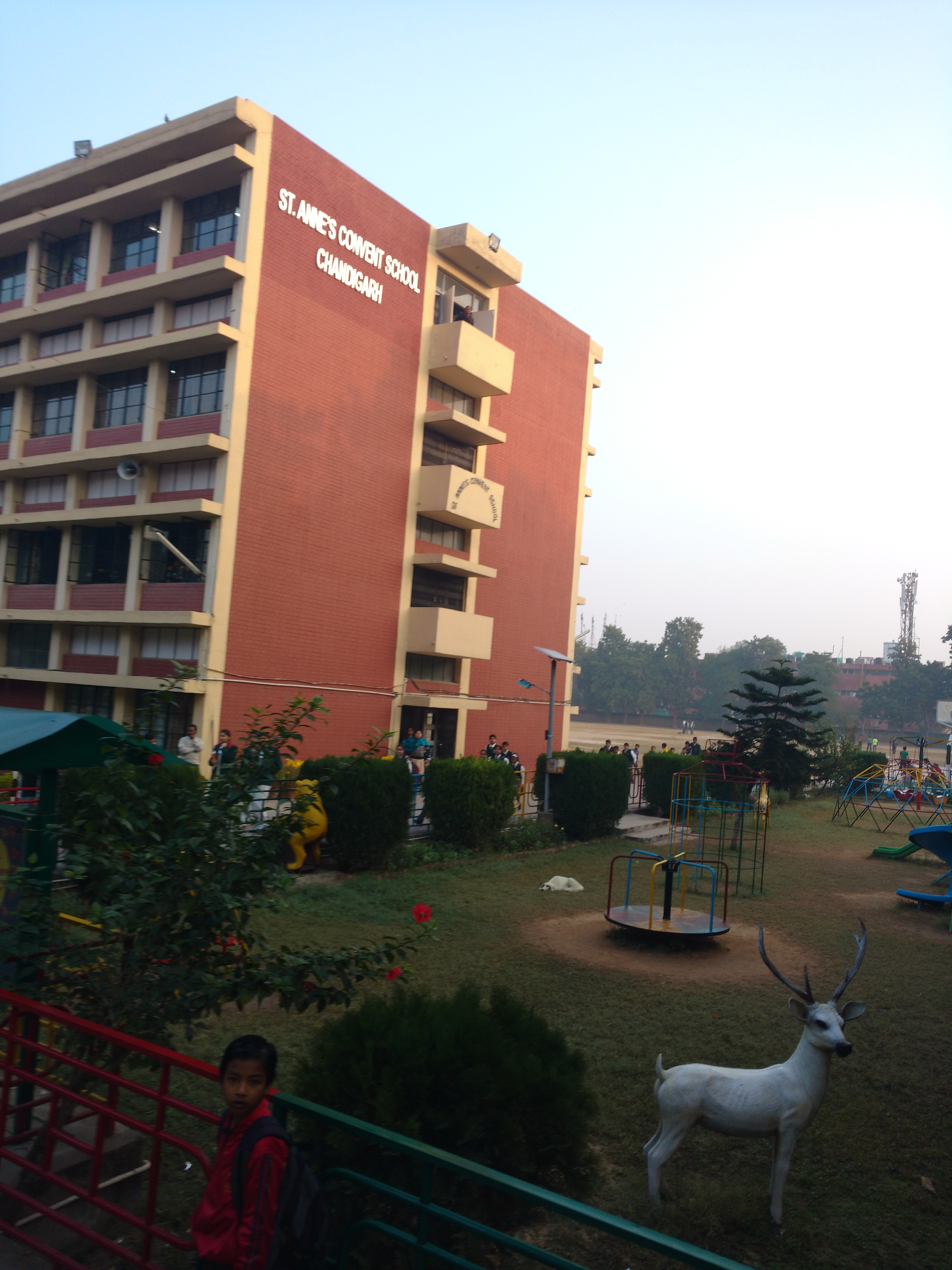
- The front portion of the primary wing building of St. Anne's Convent School, Chandigarh.
- Chandigarh; India

Information
- Type: Institution for Secondary Education
- Motto: Let Your Light Shine
- Patron saint: St. Anne
- Established: 1977; 49 years ago
- Principal: Sr. Siji Issac
- Grades: Nursery – 12th
- Enrolment: ~3000
- Language: English, Hindi, Punjabi
- Colors: Olive Green & Cream
- Affiliations: CBSE
- Website: St. Anne's Convent School

St. Anne’s (/sa:nt æns/) Convent School is a co-educational secondary school in Chandigarh, India with English-language education affiliated to Central Board of Secondary Education (CBSE). It is a Christian minority institution, established by the Simla- Chandigarh Educational Society, in 1977. It is administered by the Religious Congregation of the Ursuline Sisters of Mary Immaculate, in the Catholic Church. The school is under the religious jurisdiction of the Catholic bishop of Simla- Chandigarh Diocese. It is one of the four convent schools and the only Co-Ed convent school located in Chandigarh.

== Location ==
St. Anne's Convent School is located at 30° 42′ 22″ N and 76° 46′ 26″ E co-ordinates in Chandigarh. It lies on Chandi Path in Sector 32 C, one of the southern sectors of Chandigarh. It covers an area of around 30,000m^{2}.

== Achievements ==
- A student topped the All India Institute of Medical Sciences MBBS Entrance Exam for the year 2013.
- A student got All India Rank 103 in the Indian Administrative Services (IAS) exam of the year 2013.
- A student made it to the 'Top 200' list of the Indian Administrative Services (IAS) exam with the All India rank of 184 in 2013.
- A student made it to top 100 in the Indian Administrative Services Exam (IAS) exam in the year 2014.
- A student of St. Anne’s Convent Chandigarh topped the National Talent Search Examination in UT Chandigarh (2011–12) conducted by NCERT.
- Prakash Gupta topped tricity in UG-AIPMT 2014.
- The school was awarded best day school in 'Admissions Transparency' with a rating of 77 out of 100 in the year 2010 along with Springdales School, New Delhi and Inventure Academy, Bangalore with 77 rating each.

== Notable alumni ==
- Sachin Bansal, co-founder of Flipkart.
- Binny Bansal, co-founder of Flipkart.

== SAOSA ==
St. Anne's Old Student Association abbreviated as SAOSA is an association of school's alumni. It organizes programs and sports matches between school current and old students.
