= St. Anne's High School, Fort, Mumbai =

Location
- Madame Cama Road, Fort; Mumbai, Maharashtra, India; Mumbai, Maharashtra 400 001

Information
- School type: Day; Non-residential
- Established: 1929
- Founder: Religious of Jesus and Mary
- Sister school: Convent of Jesus and Mary, Fort, Mumbai (Fort Convent)
- Principal: Sr. Flory Fargose
- Grades: Junior Preparatory to Class 10
- Houses: St. Matthew (red), St. Mark (blue), St. Luke (yellow), St. John (green)
- Colours: Red, Blue, Yellow and Green

St. Anne's High School, Fort, Mumbai, popularly known as St. Anne's, Fort is a private girls school in Mumbai, India. Established in 1929, the school is part of the global network of Convent of Jesus and Mary schools and is considered one of South Mumbai’s legacy schools.

The school is housed at Grosvenor House on Madame Cama Road in the heart of the historical Fort neighbourhood of South Mumbai. The school is across the street from the National Gallery of Modern Art and the Chhatrapati Shivaji Maharaj Vastu Sangrahalaya museum and is about ten minutes walking distance from the Gateway of India, Oval Maidan and Cooperage Ground, all historical landmarks of the city. The locality is home to several reputed schools of Mumbai like Campion School and Fort Convent School.

== History ==
The school was established on 11 June 1929 by the pioneering team of Mother Beatrice Marti Sr. Pauline Coelho and Sr. Ida Mendes of the Congregation of the Religious of Jesus and Mary, a Roman Catholic order founded by Claudine Thévenet (Mary of St. Ignatius) in Lyon, France in 1818. The work of the Congregation started in India in November 1842 with the arrival of five French nuns at Agra. On 18 December 1850, nuns from the Congregation arrived in the Mazagaon neighbourhood of the erstwhile Bombay Presidency (now included in the mega-city of Mumbai), not far from the present St. Anne Church. The nuns of the Congregation went on to establish many educational institutions in Mumbai including the St. Anne's High School in Fort.

=== Foundation and early years (1929 to 1942) ===
1929 - The school started operating from a large rented room in Derby Hotel at Colaba Causeway in June 1929. On the first day, 59 students were admitted to the school.

1930 - As the number of students began to swell, the school moved to the second floor of Ormsby House on Ormiston road at Wellington Pier, Colaba. At this time, 120 students were enrolled in the school. In the period that followed, the school began operating toddlers' classes from the ground floor of the building. In this year, the school was placed under the patronage of St. Anne's and was given its name.

1931 - This was a significant year in the school's history as the first batch appeared for the Bombay matriculation examination. The school operated from Jer Villa (Steafan Hall) on Wodehouse Road in Colaba during this period.

1934 - For the next 8 years, the school was housed at The Grange (Archbishop's house) on Wodehouse Road.

1942 - The school came to be housed in the building that has been its abode ever since. The nuns of Religious of Jesus and Mary purchased Grosvenor House opposite the Cowasji Jehangir Hall, Colaba in this year.

== 21st Century ==
St. Anne's, Fort is a Christian Minority Institution claiming rights and privileges under Articles 29 and 30 of the Constitution of India. While, the school retains its unique Catholic identity, it is open to students from all castes and creeds. Today, the school has 930 students and 34 staff members.

The school migrated from Maharashtra State Board Secondary and Higher Secondary (SSC) curriculum to Indian Certificate of Secondary Education (ICSE) curriculum in June 2019. The ICSE curriculum was introduced for up to class VIII and the SSC classes will be discontinued by 2022.

St Anne's, Fort shares the use of Sabina Chandrashekhar Memorial Municipal ground (formerly called Wellington Garden) with other schools in the neighbourhood. In 2014, Colaba residents and principals of the schools protested against Mumbai's civic body, Brihanmumbai Municipal Corporation's proposed construction of a municipal swimming pool on the grounds.

== Notable alumni ==
- Kajal Aggarwal, Indian film actress and model.
- Dhvani Desai, Animation Filmmaker.
- Tanishaa, Indian film actress.
- Sanaya Irani, Television actress, model.
- Shubhangi Swarup, Indian print journalist, filmmaker, novelist and educationist
- Namita Mundada, Politician, MLA
