= St. Anne's School, Jodhpur =

St Anne's School

Location
- Sec-B Saraswati Nagar; Jodhpur, Rajasthan 342005; India
- Coordinates: 26°13′56″N 73°1′10″E

Information
- School type: Public
- Mottoes: Where the Mind is Without Fear
- Founded: 1983
- Principal: Dr. John Abraham
- Headmistress: Mrs. Tessy Joseph
- Grades: KG-12
- Enrolment: 4200
- Color: Light brown
- Mascot: Sacred fig leaf
- Newspaper: The St. Anne's Newsline
- Yearbook: The Oasis
- Website: www.stannes.edu.in

St. Anne's School is an independent co-educational school located at Saraswati Nagar, Jodhpur, Rajasthan, India, and founded by Mrs. Annie Cherian in 1983. It is governed by the St. Anne's School Society, a society formed under the Rajasthan Societies Registration Act.

== History ==
The school began in a rented building with thirty-three students in 1980. The next year the number of students swelled to more than 300. By 1995, the school was able to build its own school building in Saraswati Nagar.

The school consists of two administrative and academic units: St. Anne's School at Saraswati Nagar has 4000 students; St. Anne's Prep School in Rajeev Nagar, less than a kilometer away, has 1200 students. Saraswati Nagar and Rajeev Nagar are on the outskirts of Jodhpur. The two campuses have trees and lawns.

St. Anne’s Senior Higher Secondary School was founded in the summer of 1980. In the first session of the School, there were 62 students. The school now has nearly 4000 students. From 1980 to 1996, the school was housed in Jhalamand House, Ratanada, a hired building, and moved to its present location, Saraswati Nagar, near New Pali Road, in 1996. The Junior Section of St. Anne’s School has been in its present location, in Rajeev Nagar, a kilometer away from the Senior School, since 2001.

The first batch of XII class students passed out under the aegis of the Rajasthan Board of Secondary Education in 1992. Since 1998, St. Anne’s School has been affiliated to the Central Board of Secondary Education. The school has one section of Science and one of Arts at the Higher Secondary Level. The school now has two sections of Science, three sections of Commerce, and one section of Arts at the Higher Secondary Level.

St. Anne’s School has two Mathematics Laboratories, one for the Juniors and one for the Seniors, in 2005.

A fortnightly ‘Newsline’ has been coming out since 1992. In addition, ’Timeline’ is being uploaded to the school website since 2023, averaging three uploads per year.

== Campus ==
St Anne's School

The campus includes a quadrangle, a playground, two basketball courts, and two volleyball courts.

The campus is divided into two wings – the Junior Wing (classes III to V) and the Senior Wing (classes VI to XII).

Facilities include Science Labs, Maths Lab and Computer Labs, an Audio-Visual Room, an E-Beam, two Reading Halls, an auditorium, a Sports Room and rooms for Yoga and Work Education.

== Academics ==
There are parent–teacher meetings to encourage the cooperation of the students, teachers and the parents. Students are provided with a knowledge of languages, mathematics, sciences and computers. The students are evaluated for their performance under the CCE pattern. Under this pattern there are four formative assessments and two summative assessments in one academic session.

Co-curricular and extra-curricular activities are a part of a student's time in the school. There are child craft exhibitions, science exhibitions, quiz contests, English and Hindi debates, recitation contests, fêtes, sports festivals and Annual Day Celebrations.

A printing press has made possible the printing of material for academic purposes, as well as enabled publication of a fortnightly newspaper. The St. Anne's Newsline develops the writing ability of the students. The school's cooling plants provide pure and cold water.

== School recognition ==
The school has received awards for being the best school in the city for a number of years. Many of its ex-students are technologists and managers working with national and multi-national organisations like Infosys, Volkswagen, HUL, Procter & Gamble, Tata Group, etc. in India and abroad.

== House system ==
Sport in St. Anne's takes place generally in year groups. For pastoral and sporting competition purposes, the school is divided into four houses. Each student is assigned to a house at the start of their time in the school and will remain in that house for the whole of their school career. The houses are:

House	House colour
Jodha	
Shivaji	
Ashoka	
Akbar	

== Sports ==
Apart from the playground the school has two basketball courts, a volleyball court, a table tennis room and a sports room. Every year the school organizes inter-house championship and the annual sports meet. The students interested in pursuing a particular sport are provided professional training in the evening at Barkatullah Khan Stadium.

The students excelling in the inter-house activities participate in CBSE cluster, Zonal and National level championship. Some of the students have got admission in India’s best colleges through their achievements in sports. The St. Anne’s cricket team won the under 17-district champions in 2007.

Sports day is an annual event. It is an inter-house athletic meet with events for the Junior, Middle and Senior Classes

== Transport ==
Tata Motors 407 model minibuses are primarily used because they are comfortable, economical and they meet all safety standards. Each bus has speed limiter that restricts the speed to 40 km/h.

The bus routes are divided into six sectors:

- Mandore Area
- Inside City Area
- Ratanada
- C.H.B. Area
- Sardarpura/ Shastri Nagar
- Madhubun/Kudi H.B.

== School prayer ==
The school prayer is the 36th poem from Rabindranath Tagore’s collection of poems ‘Gitanjali’

This is my prayer to thee, my lord—strike, strike at the root of penury in my heart.
Give me the strength lightly to bear my joys and sorrows.
Give me the strength to make my love fruitful in service.
Give me the strength never to disown the poor or bend my knees before insolent might.
Give me the strength to raise my mind high above daily trifles.
And give me the strength to surrender my strength to thy will with love.

== Uniform ==
Monday to Friday the uniform is fawn and brown. On Saturday, the uniform is T-shirt and white skirts or trousers. In winter, the students wear brown blazers, sweaters and ties. There will be a change in the winter uniform for the session 2012-2013.

== Working hours ==
- April to November: 7:30am to 1pm
- December to March: 7:45am to 1:15pm

== See also ==
- Arid Forest Research Institute (AFRI) Jodhpur
- Jodhpur
- List of schools in Rajasthan
- Rajasthan
