= Ste. Anne's Hospital =

Ste. Anne's Hospital Hôpital Sainte-Anne
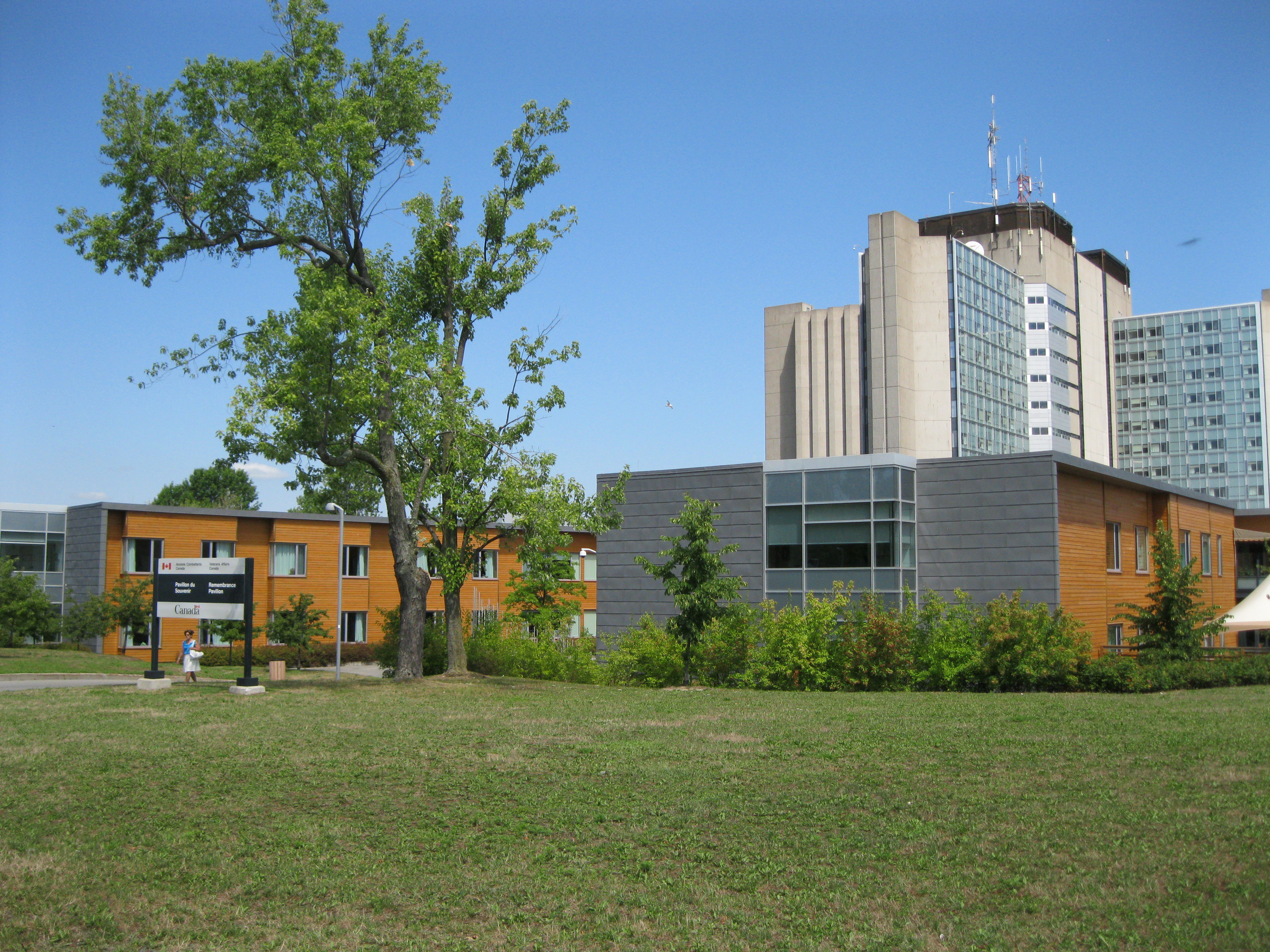

- Location of Ste. Anne's Hospital on the Island of Montreal

Geography
- Location: Sainte-Anne-de-Bellevue, Quebec, Canada
- Coordinates: 45.413°N 73.949°W

Organization
- Care system: Public Medicare (Canada)
- Type: Specialist
- Affiliated university: McGill University

Services
- Beds: 446

History
- Founded: 1917

Links
- Lists: Hospitals in Canada

Ste. Anne's Hospital (French: Hôpital Sainte-Anne) is a hospital located in Sainte-Anne-de-Bellevue, Quebec, Canada. It primarily serves veterans of the Canadian Forces and is specialized in long-term and geriatric care. It also treats younger veterans for operational stress injuries and post-traumatic stress disorder. The hospital has 446 beds in private rooms and underwent an extensive renovation in 2009.

== History ==
Ste. Anne's Hospital was founded in 1917 in response to the many wounded Canadian veterans returning from World War I. It was built on land leased from McGill University on its Macdonald Campus, in close proximity to major rail lines and roads. In 1950, Veterans Affairs Canada purchased the hospital's grounds, which contained two dozen buildings, from McGill.

Construction for a new hospital began in 1968, in order to replace the original buildings that were intended for temporary use. The new hospital, which is 14 storeys tall, was built so that it could be converted into a general hospital if required. The new hospital accepted its first patients in 1971. In order to comply with provincial standards for long-term care facilities, renovations were undertaken in 2003, which resulted in the construction of a thermal power plant and electrical substation, as well as a new building, the 116-bed Remembrance Pavilion to accommodate patients with cognitive impairment. The Main Pavilion was renovated from 2007 to 2009, and dormitories were converted into 446 private rooms.

It is the last remaining hospital operated by Veterans Affairs Canada. On April 27, 2012, Veterans Affairs Canada and the Government of Quebec signed an agreement to transfer the hospital to provincial jurisdiction. On June 14, 2013, it was announced that Ste. Anne's Hospital would become geriatrics centre, and would be an autonomous entity reporting to the Montreal Health and Social Services Agency.

In February 2021, a $19 million settlement was reached in a class action lawsuit alleging that the quality of care was degraded after the transfer to provincial jurisdictions.

In 1998, the Ste. Anne's Hospital Foundation was created named after the hospital. It was renamed by 2017 to Quebec Veterans Foundation (QFV), or La Fondation québécoise des Vétérans (FQV) in French.
