= Fort Sainte Anne =

Fort Sainte Anne may refer to:

- Fort Sainte Anne (Nova Scotia), Canada
- Fort Albany (Ontario), Canada, known as Fort Sainte Anne while it was under French control
- Fort Sainte Anne (Vermont), United States
