= Ödön Lechner =

Hungarian architect (1845–1914)

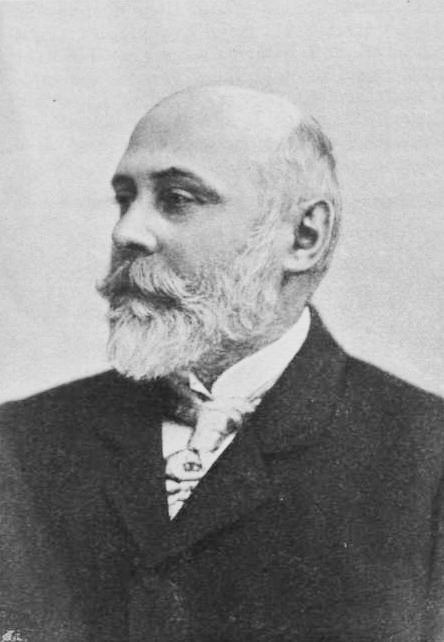
- Born: 27 August 1845; Pest, Hungary
- Died: 10 June 1914 (aged 68); Budapest, Hungary
- Other name: "Hungarian Gaudí"
- Education: Schinkel Academy
- Occupation: Architect
- Spouse: Irma Primayer
- Children: János Ödön; Irma
- Parent(s): Johann Lechner; Theresia Schummayer
- Buildings: Headquarters, National Bank of Hungary; Museum of Applied Arts

Ödön Lechner (born János Ödön Lechner; 27 August 1845 – 10 June 1914) was a Hungarian architect, one of the prime representatives of the Hungarian Szecesszió style, which was related to Art Nouveau in the rest of Europe, including the Vienna Secession. He is famous for decorating his buildings with Zsolnay tile patterns inspired by old Hungarian and Turkic folk art, which are combined with modern materials such as iron.

Lechner's work was submitted in 2008 for inclusion on the World Heritage List.

== Early career and travel ==
Lechner was born in Pest into a bourgeois family. His father, János Lechner (1812–1884), of Bavarian descent, was a certified lawyer, capital tax collector, and owner of a brick factory, who married Terézia Schummayer (1817–1895). His paternal grandparents were János Lechner Nepomuk (1774–1845), the head of a building materials factory and the Royal Beauty Commissioner of Pest and Erzsébet Hupf (1786–1853). He began his secondary school studies at the Real School of Downtown Pest (Pest-belvárosi Reáltanodán), then he attended the József Ipartanoda (now the Budapest University of Technology and Economics) to study architecture in 1865–66, where one of his teachers was Antal Szkalnitzky, responsible for many of Buda and Pest's major public buildings in the decades before the two cities merged in 1873.

In 1866 Lechner went to Berlin, where he spent three years at the Academy of Architecture with Alajos Hauszmann and Gyula Pártos, studying under Karl Bötticher, who became a great influence with his lectures on building materials, especially the role of iron-framed structures. After finishing his studies in Berlin, Lechner departed on a one-year tour and study in Italy in 1868 with his wife Irma Primayer, whom he had recently married. In 1869 he went into a partnership with Gyula Pártos and the architecture firm received a steady flow of commissions during the boom years of the 1870s, during the construction of buildings lining the ring roads on the Pest side of the Danube. The commissions the partners received were primarily apartment houses in which Lechner worked in the prevailing historicist style, drawing on neo-classical influences from Berlin and the Italian Renaissance.

Lechner interrupted his partnership with Pártos between 1874 and 1878 when he went to work in the studio of Clément Parent in France, where he was involved in the restoration of many French monuments. He took part in the design and renovation of seven castles. This was also influenced by a family tragedy, as after a six-year marriage, Lechner lost his wife Irma in 1875 and was left alone with two small children. In 1879 he also visited England.

Returning home, he reunited with Pártos and together they built a series of large-scale works, such as Szeged City Hall (1882), the apartment building of the former MÁV Pension Institute in Budapest at Andrássy út 25 (1883), and the Milkó House in Szeged). These still represent the historicizing style, but several features of his later art, such the use of folk ornamentation, are already evident in these designs. In 1889–90 he made his second visit to England, this time with Vilmos Zsolnay, a stoneware and terracotta manufacturer. There he studied oriental ceramics, primarily Indian decorative elements, at the South Kensington Museum (now the Victoria and Albert Museum). There was also a trace of English influence among his works, most notably Zsambok Castle (unfortunately destroyed in the Second World War).

== Development of Szecesszió and a Hungarian national architectural style ==
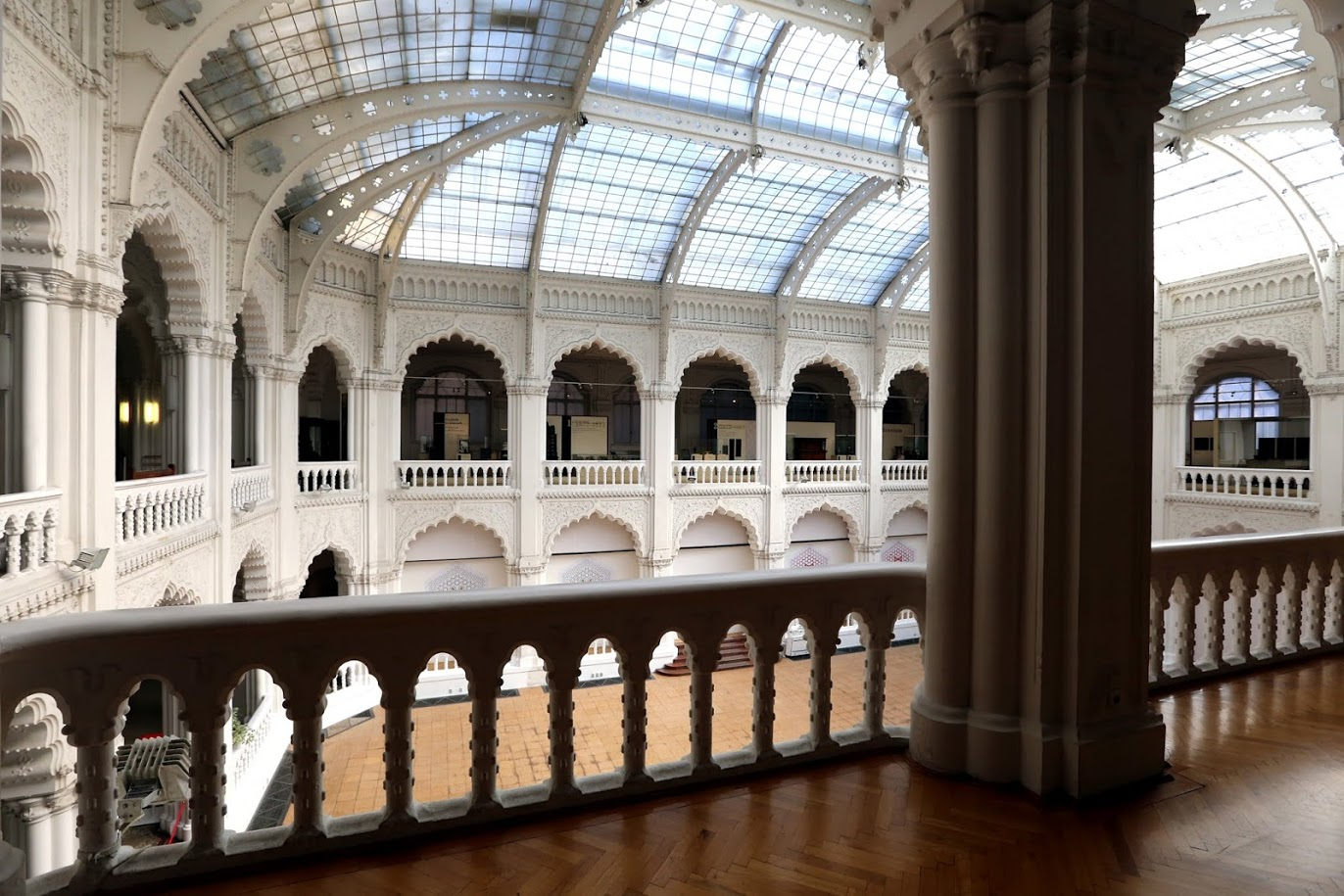
Interior light court of the Museum of Applied Arts, Budapest

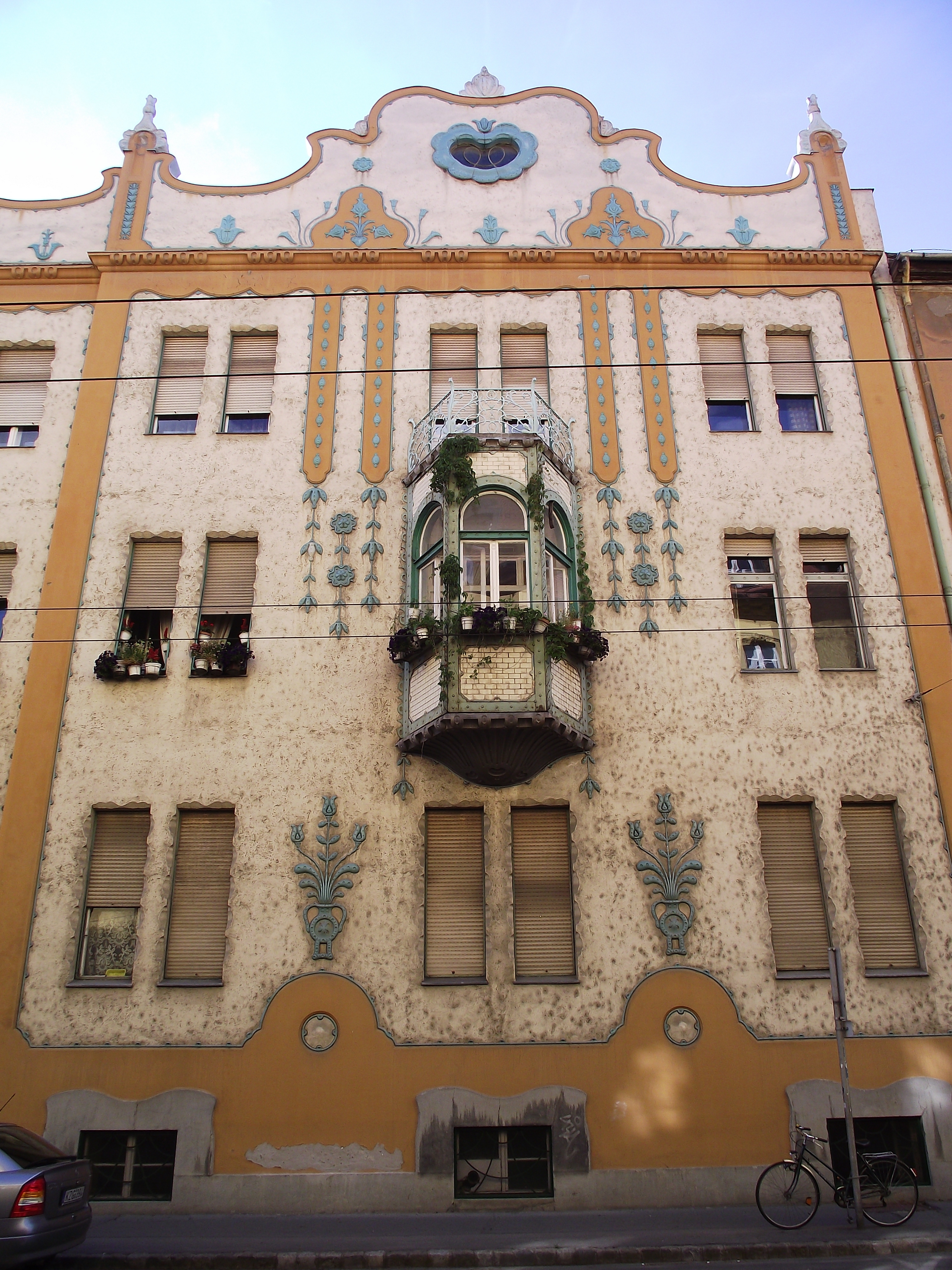
German Palace, Szeged

After 1890, Lechner increasingly turned to Hungarian folk culture and its Asiatic roots, as his inspiration in his aim to characterise a Hungarian national architectural style. His relationship with Zsolnay flourished and throughout the rest of his career he began to make free use of the company's stoneware tiles, beginning with the Thonet House in Budapest, Váci Street (1889) with its steel structure and the façade covered with Zsolnay terracotta. He followed this up with the Museum of Applied Arts (1893–1896), a commission for which he and Pártos won the design competition in 1891. The building's glazed tiles, the pyrogranite decorative elements, and the pierced floral motifs testify to Lechner's newfound Hungarian and Persian folk influences, as well as the cladding theories of German architectural theorist Gottfried Semper. The building represented a significant break from the historicism – mostly Baroque- and Gothic-revival architecture – popular in Budapest at the time. Though it encountered a mixed reception amongst critics, it was triumphantly inaugurated in time for the 1896 celebrations of the millennium anniversary of the Kingdom of Hungary. The building is today considered the first complete statement of Hungarian Szecesszió (Art Nouveau) architecture, and it formed a counterweight in the Hungarian half of the Austro-Hungarian dual monarchy to the work of the Secession developed later in Vienna around Otto Wagner, Joseph Maria Olbrich, Gustav Klimt, and others.

After 1896, Lechner and Pártos dissolved their partnership, with each continuing on in independent practice. In 1897 Lechner was commissioned to build the new home, on Stefánia út east of the city center, of the Geological Museum of Budapest, another of his distinctive Szecesszió designs. These developments in his vocabulary arguably reached their peak with the new Royal Postal Savings Bank (today the Hungarian State Treasury), on Hold utca in Budapest, built from 1899 to 1904. On 1 July 1900 he was named a "Királyi tanácsos" (Royal Counselor) to the King of Hungary, Emperor Franz Josef I, and for his work on the building the Hungarian Képzőművészek egyesülete (Association of Fine Artists) awarded him their "Nagy Aranyéremmel," or Grand Gold Medal.

Among Lechner's ecclesiastical commissions, perhaps the most notable is the parish church of St. Ladislaus in Kőbánya, Budapest, although its design is based on the earlier plans of Elek Barcza. The most significant commission of the last decade of his life was the Catholic Church of St. Elizabeth (the 'Blue Church') in Bratislava (then still called Pozsony) (1907–1913), an exuberant Szecesszió design built as the private chapel of an adjacent gymnasium, which is now an independent parish.

== Late career and influence ==
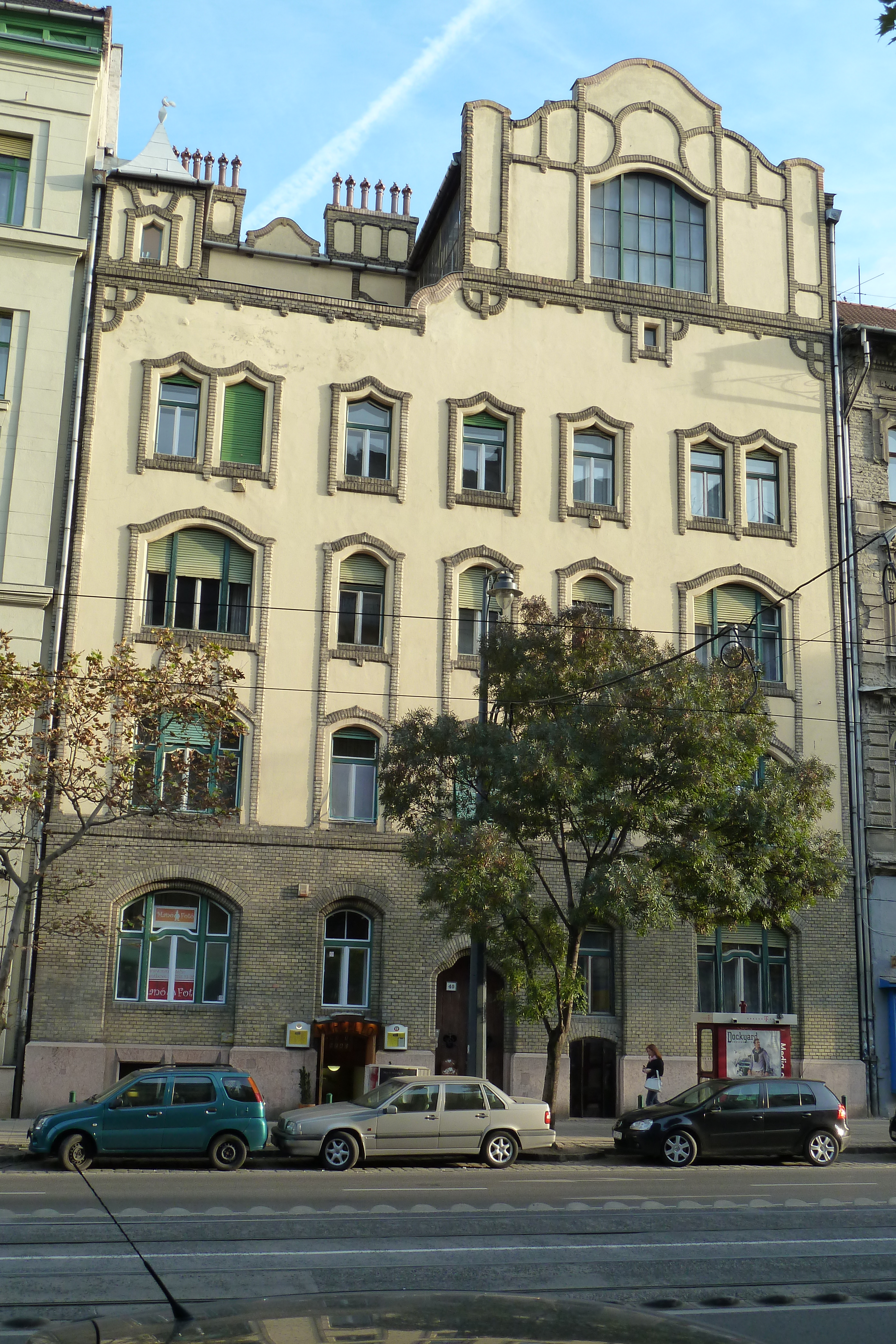
Lechner's residence in Budapest

Lechner received a gold medal at the Rome International Architecture Exhibition in 1911, along with his Austrian rival Otto Wagner. In the early 1900s, he received some small assignments, such as the reconstruction of the Dominican House in Szeged; the entrance to the Ernst Museum, Budapest; the Balázs Sipeki Villa; and the Péter Vajda Street School; but he enjoyed little success in his search for larger commissions. In 1906 he published a summary of his views in the journal Művészet. One of Lechner's final commissions was for the Gyula Vermes house in the fifth district of Budapest in 1910–11.

Nonetheless, his creation of the Szecesszió spawned a number of followers and imitators throughout Hungary, including Béla Lajta, Géza Maróti, Dezső Jakab and Marcell Komor, Zoltán Bálint, Lajos Jámbor, Artúr Sebestyén, Dénes Györgyi, Béla Jánszky, Dezső Zrumetzky, István Medgyaszay, Aladár Árkay, and Albert Kálmán Kőrössy.

== Buildings and projects ==
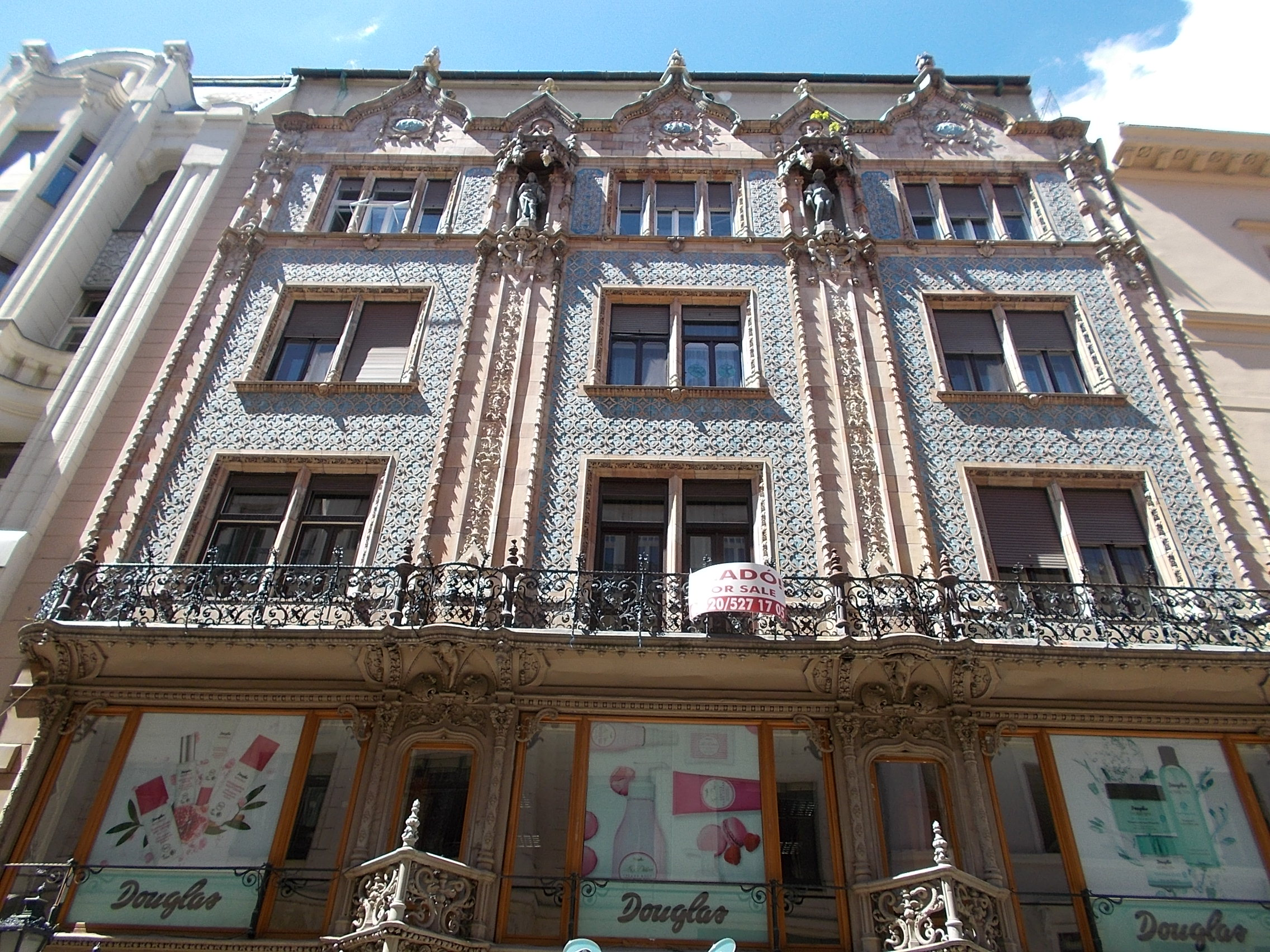
Thonet House, Budapest

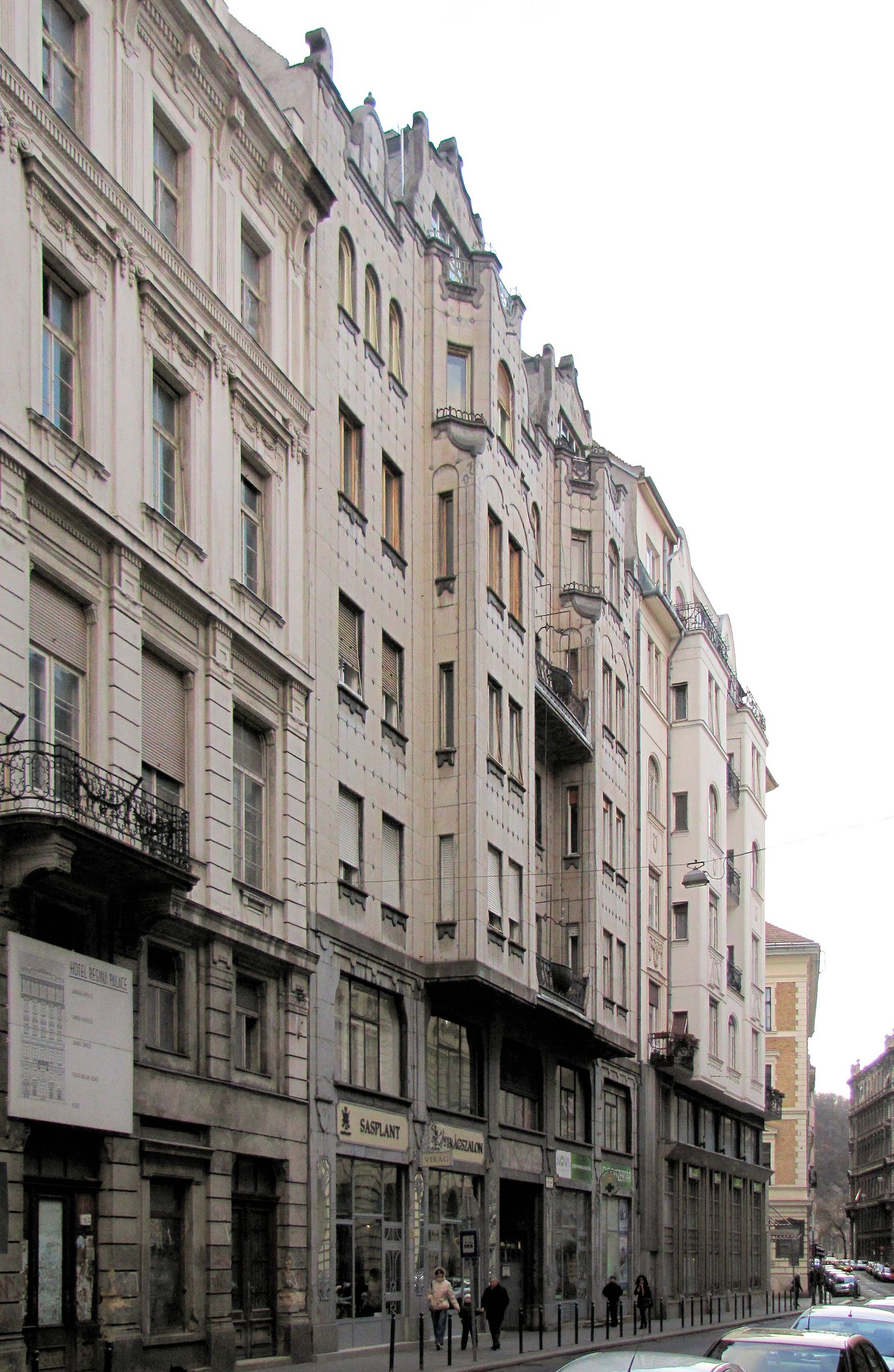
Gyula Vermes House, Irányi ut 15, Budapest

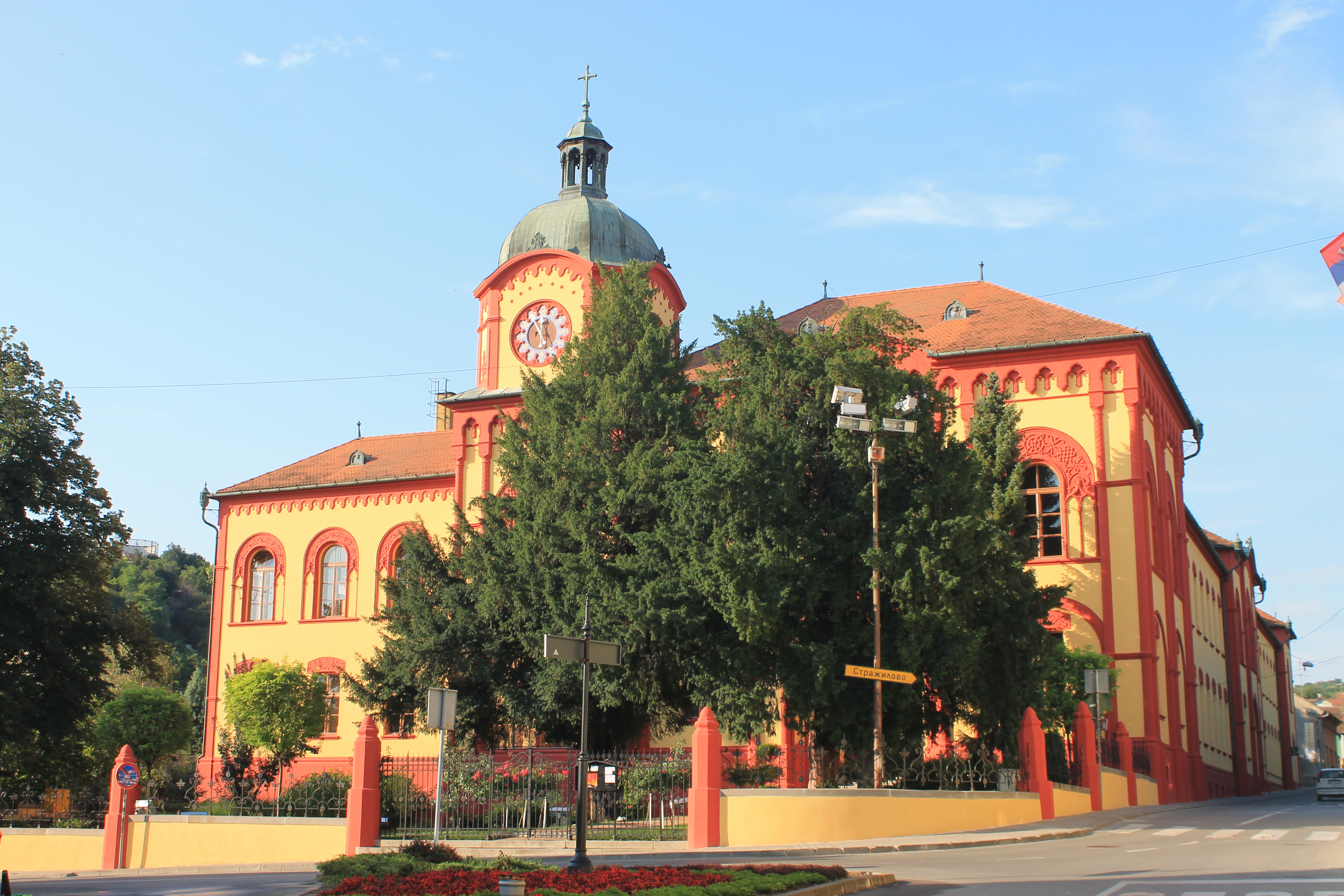
Karlovci Gymnasium, Sremski Karlovci, Serbia

- 1870: Batthyány Tomb
- 1871: House of József Lenhossék, Budapest VIII., Múzeum krt. 33 (destroyed)
- 1871: Military men's house of 1848, Budapest IX., Soroksári út 62 (destroyed)
- 1871–1872: János Primayer House, Budapest V., Sas u. 9 (Former Kéksas Street) (Lechner himself lived here, his father-in-law's residence, for an extended period)
- 1871–1874: Apartment building, Budapest V., Szent István tér 3
- 1871–1875: Pál Mándl house, Budapest VI., Bajcsy-Zsilinszky út 43
- 1872–1874: Kecskemét apartment building, Budapest V., Veres Pálné utca 9
- 1873: Arad City Hall (plan)
- 1874: Tomb of Irma Primayer, Budapest VIII., Fiumei Úti Tomb Garden
- 1874–1875: Kecskemét Savings Bank, Kecskemét, Szabadság tér
- 1875: Skating Rink, Budapest, Városliget (demolished in 1893)
- 1880: School, Sombor
- 1882: Kecskemét City Baths (unbuilt)
- 1882–1883: City Hall, Szeged, Széchenyi tér 10 (with Gyula Pártos)
- 1882–1883: Milkó Palace (monument), Szeged, Roosevelt Square 5
- 1882–1884: Hungarian Railway Pensioners Building (Palais Drechsler), Budapest, (with Pártos)
- 1885–1886: Nagybecskerek City Hall, (today's Zrenjanin, Serbia), (with Pártos)
- 1885–1886: Nagybecskerek, County Hall
- 1887: Rudolf cavalry barracks, Kecskemét (listed monument)
- 1888–1889: Thonet House, Budapest V., Váci u. 11 (listed monument)
- 1888: Ottó Biedermann Castle, Mozsgó (destroyed in a fire in 1917 and then partially restored)
- 1889–1891: Karlovci Gymnasium, Karlóca (now Sremski Karlovci, Serbia) (with Pártos)
- 1889–1893: Szegzárd Hotel, Szekszárd
- 1890–1896. Kecskemét City Hall, Kossuth Lajos tér 1 (with Pártos)
- 1891–1896: Budapest Museum of Applied Arts, Budapest IX., Üllői út 33-37 (listed monument)
- 1891–1897: Saint Ladislaus Church (Szent László-plébániatemplom), Kőbánya, Budapest X., Templom tér (listed monument)
- 1892–1893: Palace of Simon Leovich, Subotica, Serbia
- 1894: Ferenc József Bridge traffic plan, Budapest
- 1895: Lechner House, Budapest IX., Berzenczey u. 11
- 1895: Greek Church Street, Kecskemét, Bazaar Row
- 1896–1899: Geological Institute, Budapest
- 1897: Ilka Lechner Vacation House, Pécel, Korányi u. 8.
- 1898–1900: Lechner House, Bartók Béla út 40 (listed monument)
- 1899: Stock Exchange, Budapest (unbuilt)
- 1899–1901: The Postal Savings Bank building (Postatakarékpénztár), Budapest
- 1900: Villa of Károly Lechner, Cluj-Napoca
- 1902: Postal Palace plan, Bratislava (with Béla Lajta)
- 1902–1904: Klein Castle, Szirma (now Miskolc) (with Béla Lajta; destroyed in World War II)
- 1903: Gerngross Department Store, Vienna (design competition)
- 1903: Tomb of Schmidl family, Kozma Street Cemetery, Budapest, together with Béla Lajta
- 1905: Ministry of Culture, Budapest V., Széchenyi rkp. (design competition)
- 1905: Villa of Balázs Béla Sipeki, today MVGYOSZ, the headquarters of the Hungarian Association of the Blind and Visually Impaired, Budapest XIV., Hermina út 47 (listed monument)
- 1906–1908: Royal Catholic Gymnasium in Pozsony (Pressburg), Kingdom of Hungary (Kráľovské katolícke gymnázium in today's Bratislava, Slovakia)
- 1907–1913: The Church of St. Elizabeth (Blue Church) in Pozsony (Pressburg) (today's Bratislava)
- 1909: State Teacher Career Training Center, Sárospatak
- 1909: Plans of the monument to Queen Elizabeth, Budapest, Castle Hill
- 1909–1910: Kecskemét, Water Tower and Rákóczi monument, plan
- 1909–1912: Saint Ladislaus Church in South Norwalk, Connecticut, USA
- 1910: Mixed-use building at Irányi ut 15, Budapest
- 1910-1911: Gyula Vermes House, Budapest
- 1913–1924: Simor Street School (today Péter Vajda Primary and Sports School of Singing and Music), Budapest VIII., Vajda Péter u. 25-31
- 1914: Szent László Gimnázium, Budapest X. (Kőbánya), Kőrösi Csoma Sándor út 28-34 (listed monument)
- 1914: Francis Joseph Memorial Church, Budapest VIII., Rezső tér (design competition, 1st prize)
- 1914–1915: Szent László Gimnázium, Budapest

== Gallery ==
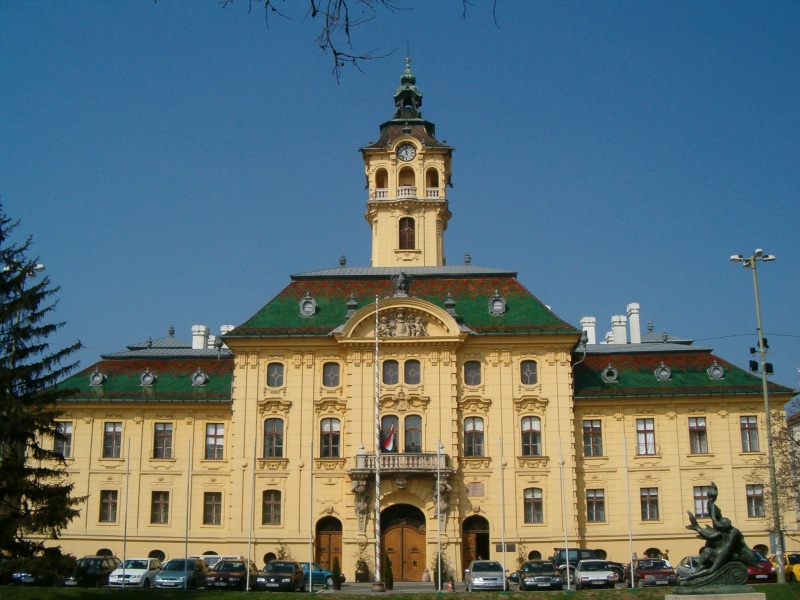
City Hall, Szeged (1882)

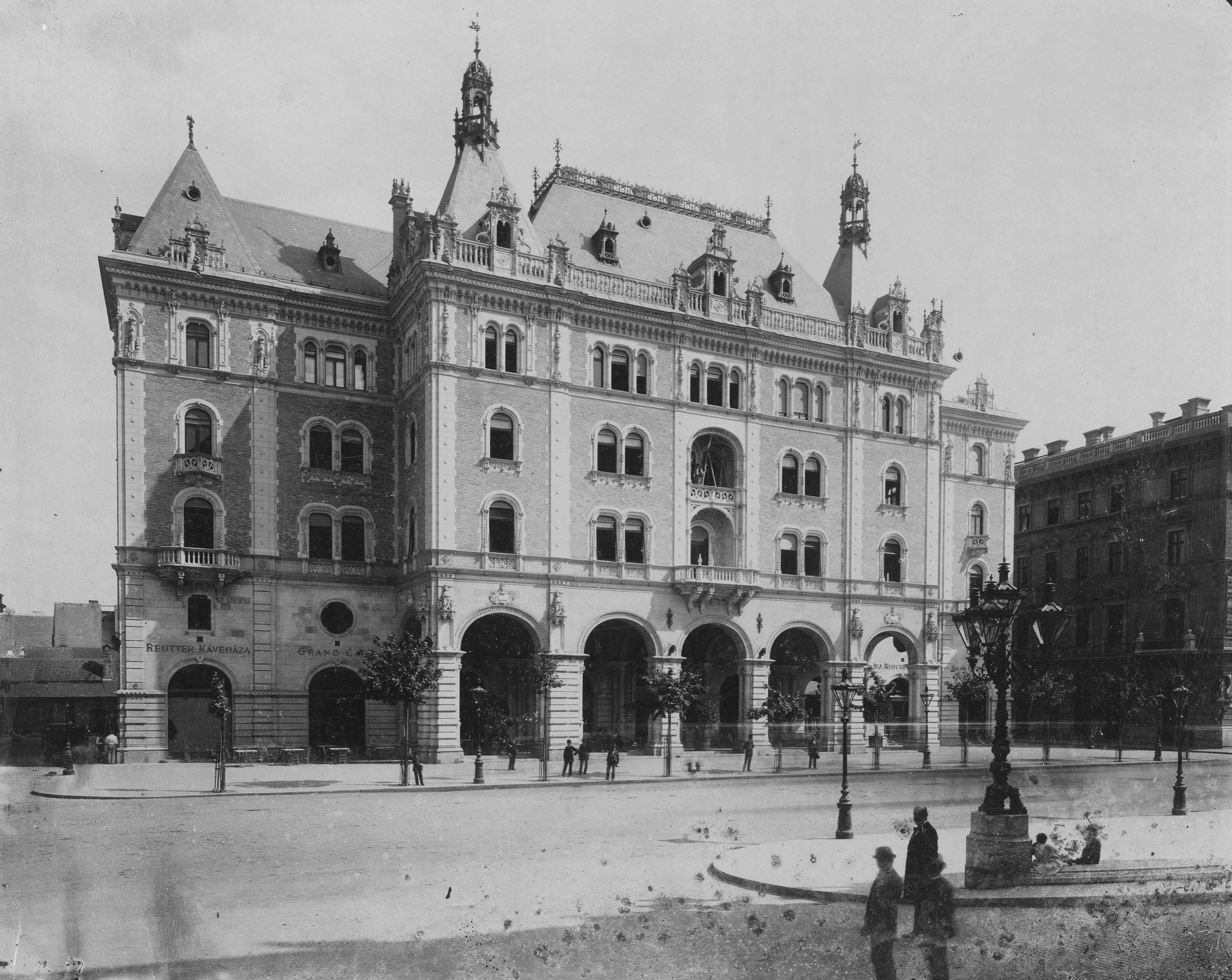
Drechsler Palais, Budapest (1882–1884)

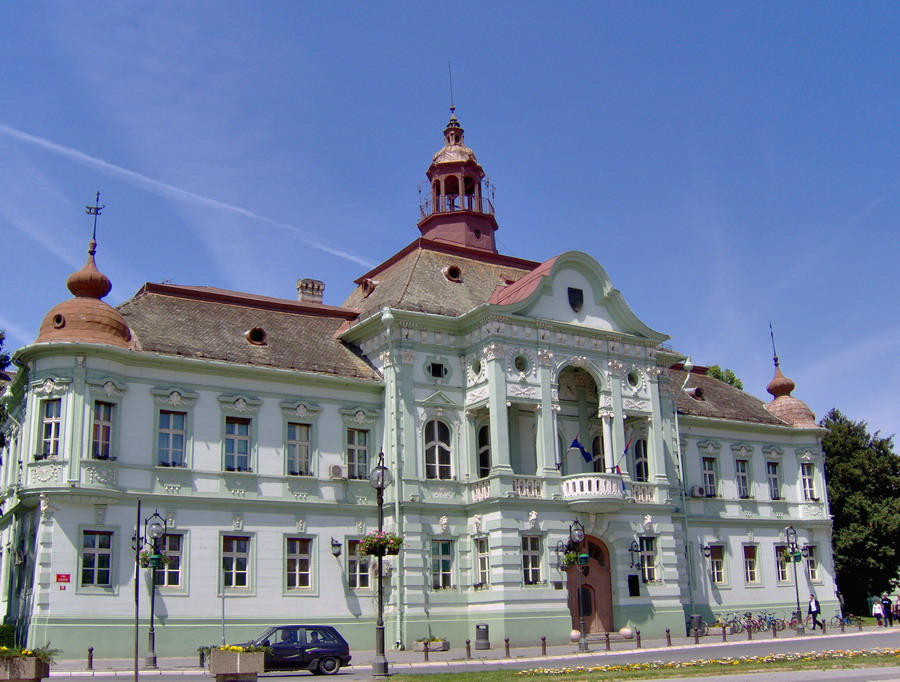
Zrenjanin City Hall, today's Serbia (1885–1886)

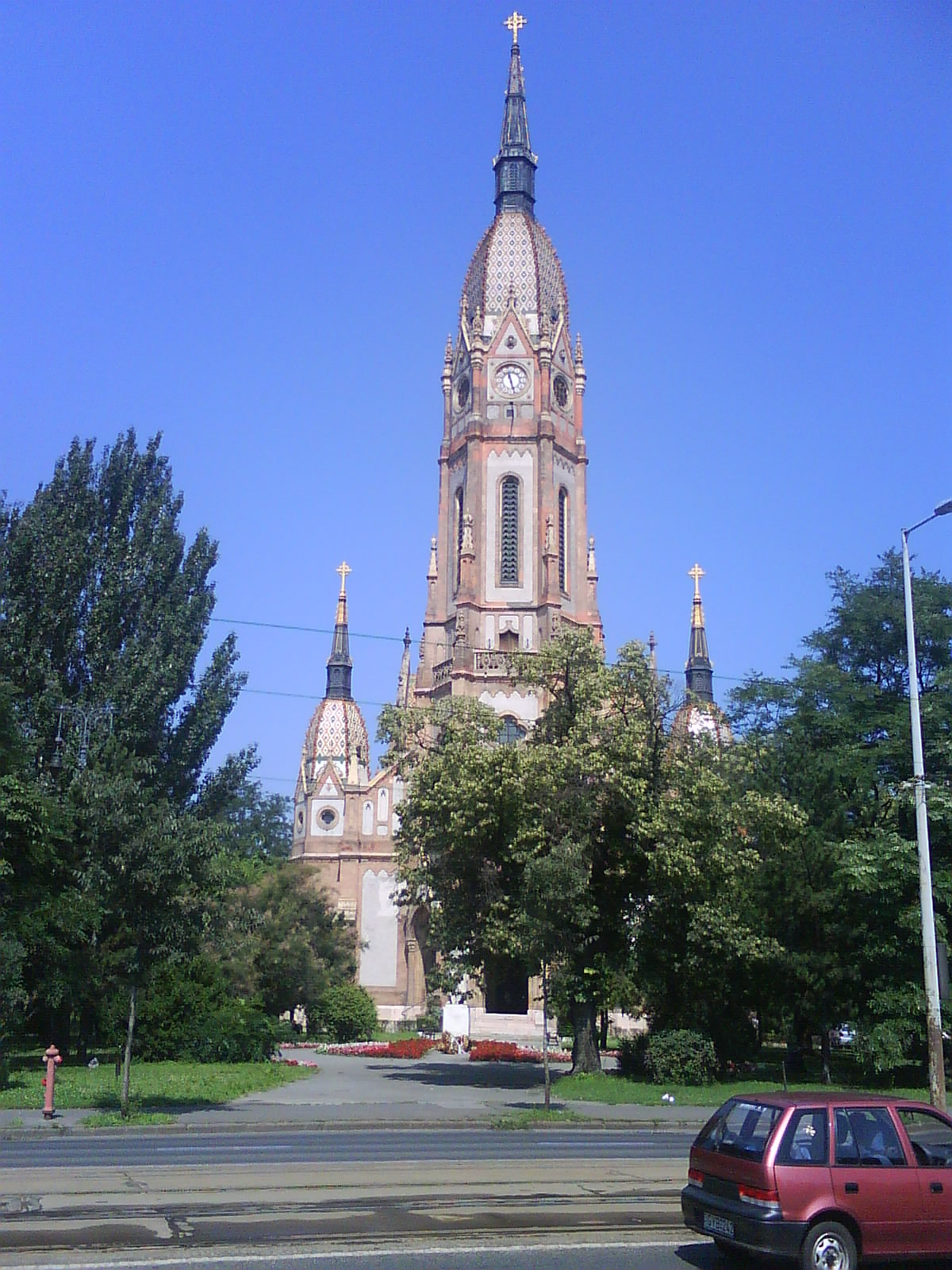
Saint Ladislaus Church, Kőbánya (1891–1897)

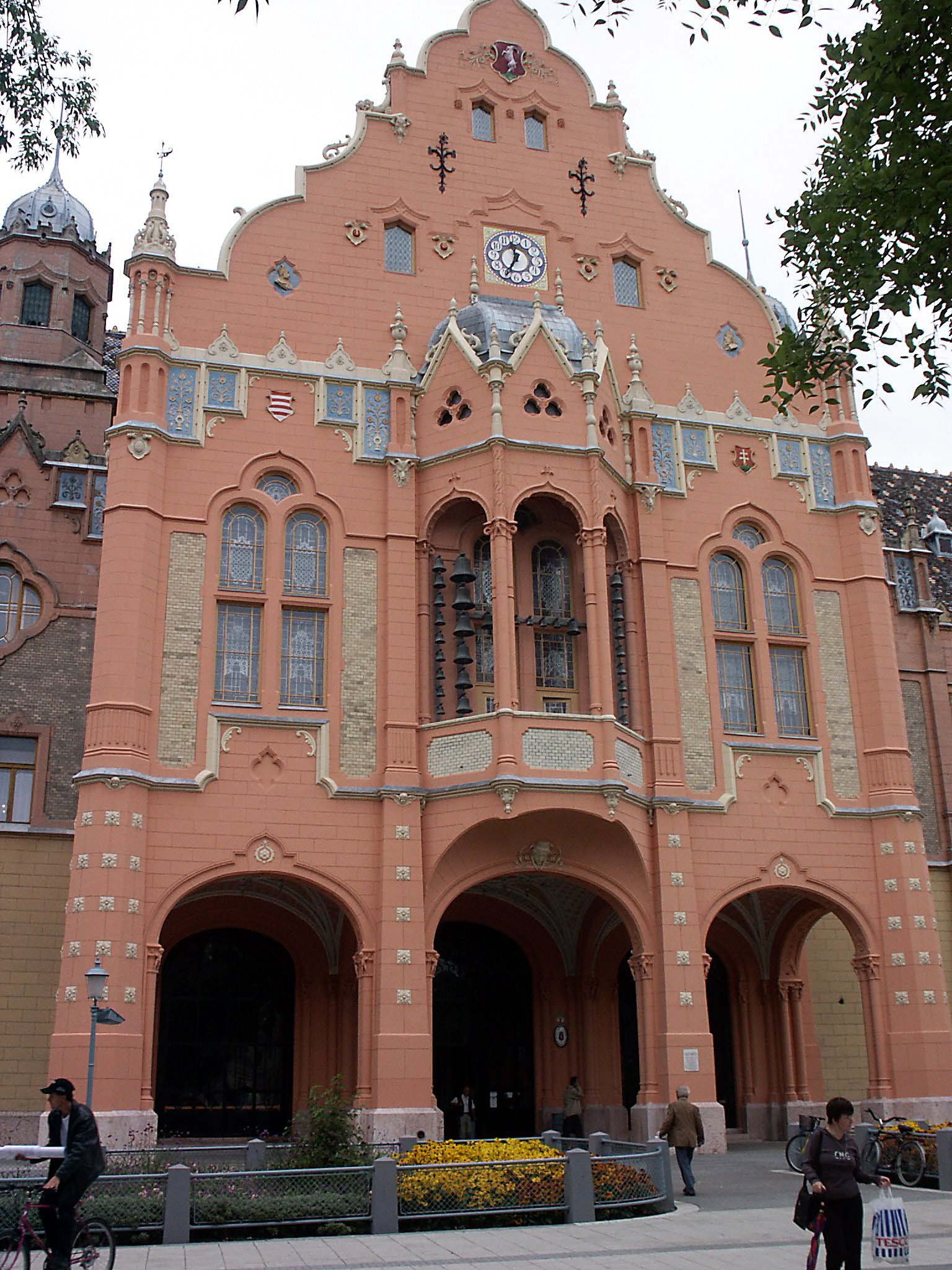
City Hall, Kecskemét (1893)

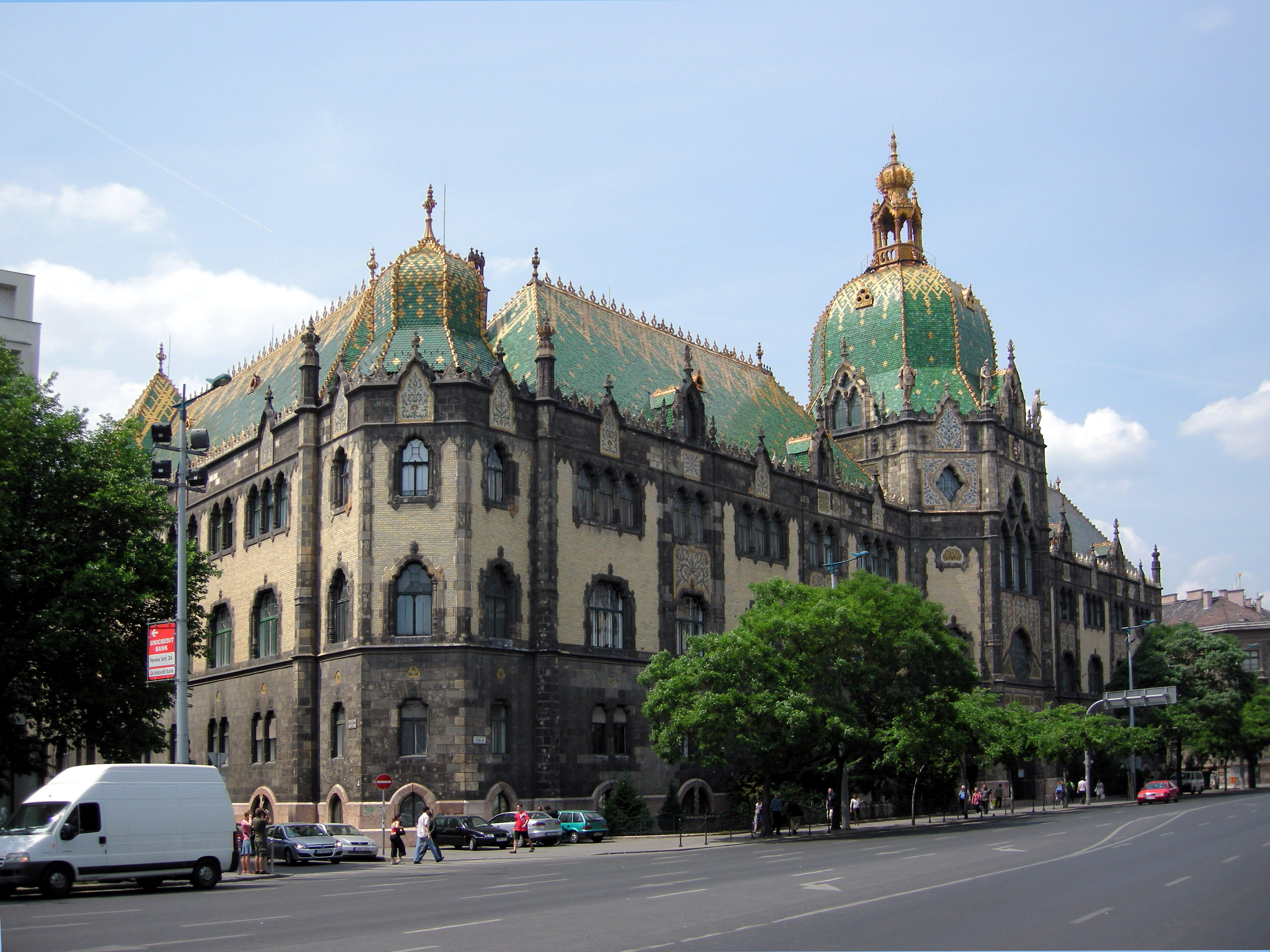
Museum of Applied Arts in Budapest (1896)

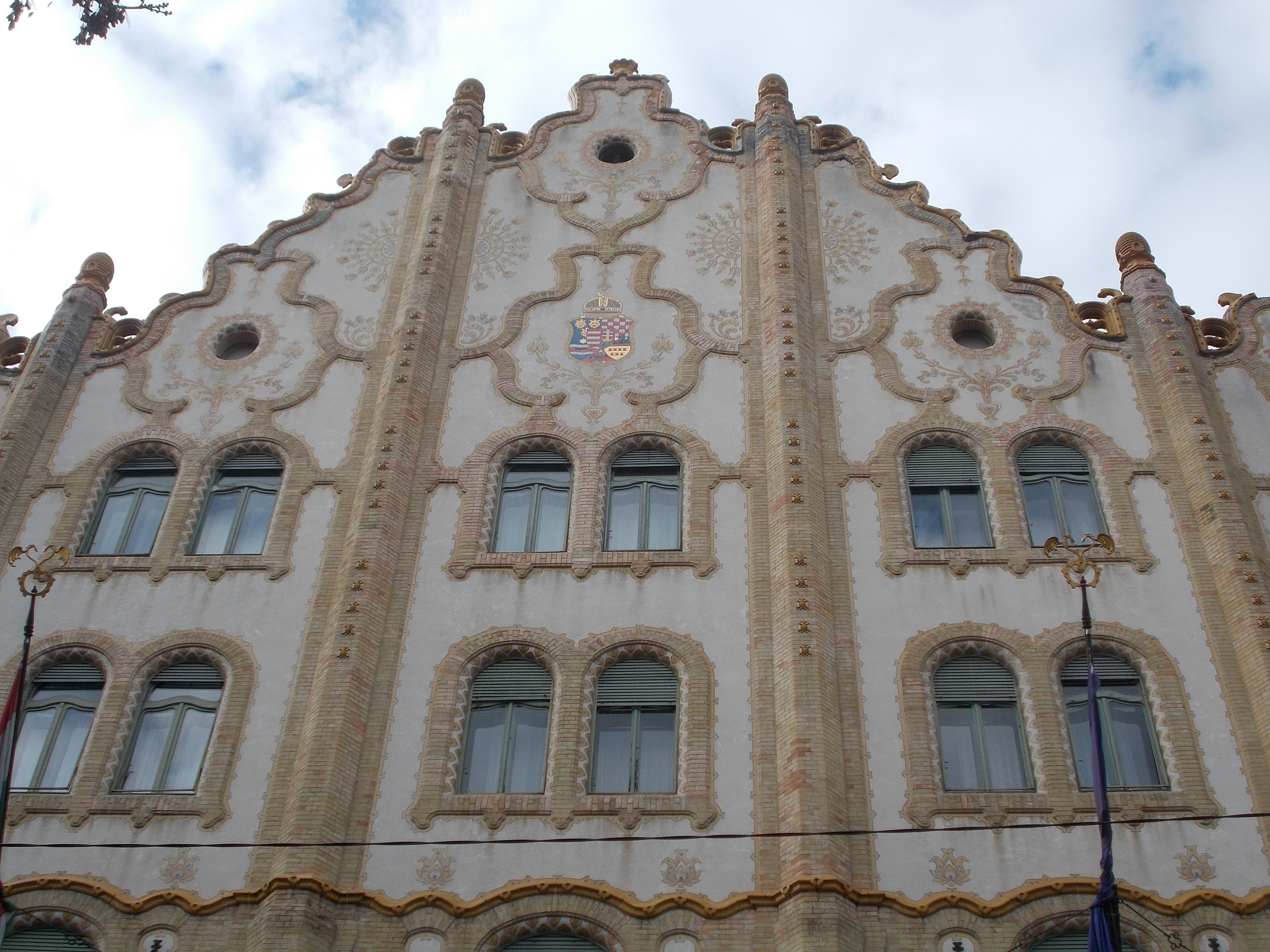
Hungarian Postal Savings Bank (1899–1901)

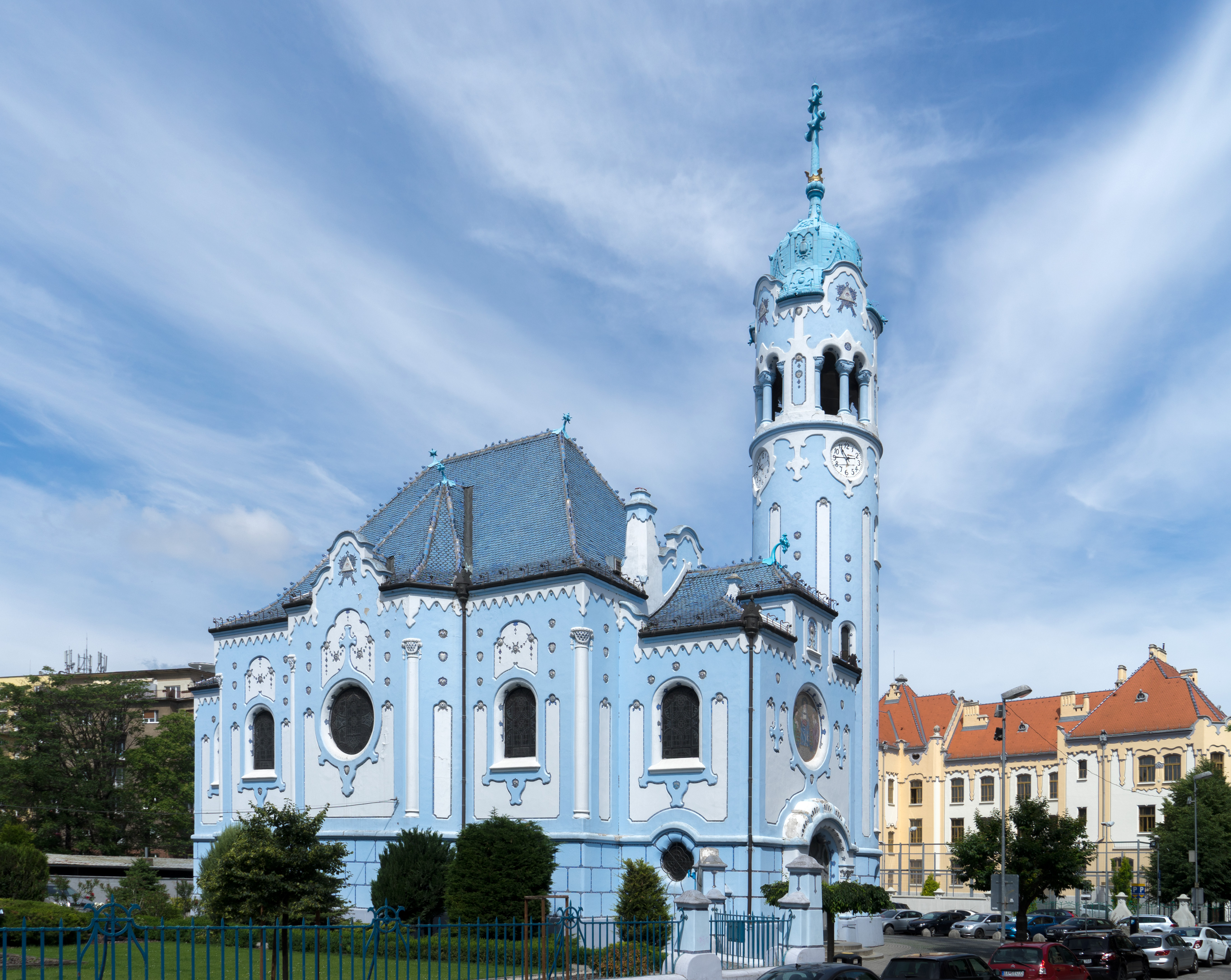
The Blue Church of Pozsony (Pressburg) (today's Bratislava, Slovakia) (1907–1913)

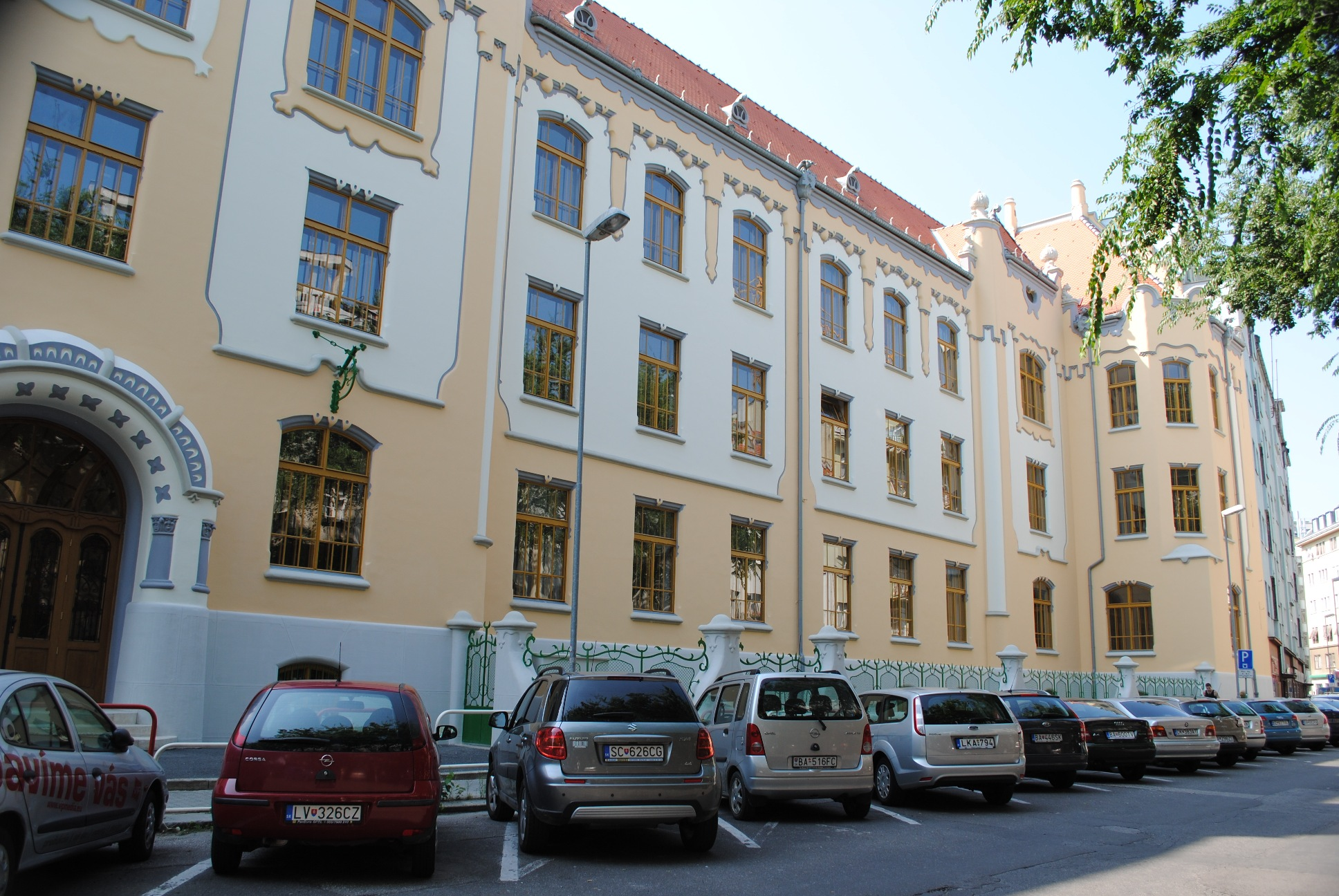
Gymnázium Grösslingová in Pozsony (Pressburg) (today's Bratislava) (1906–1908)

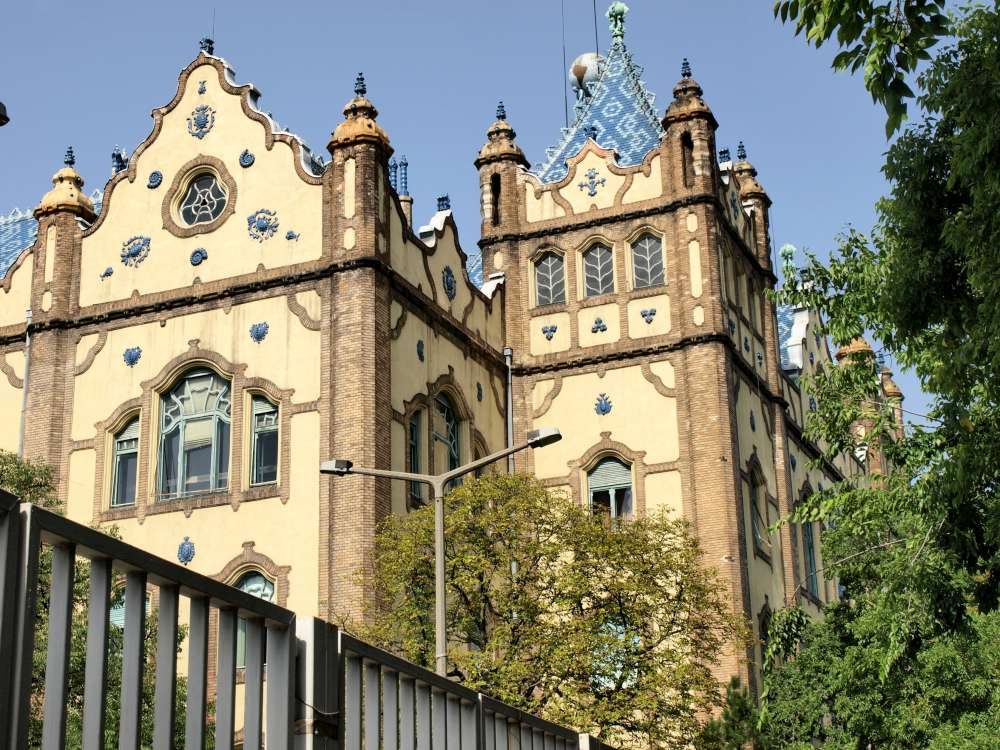
Geological Museum, Budapest (1896–1899)

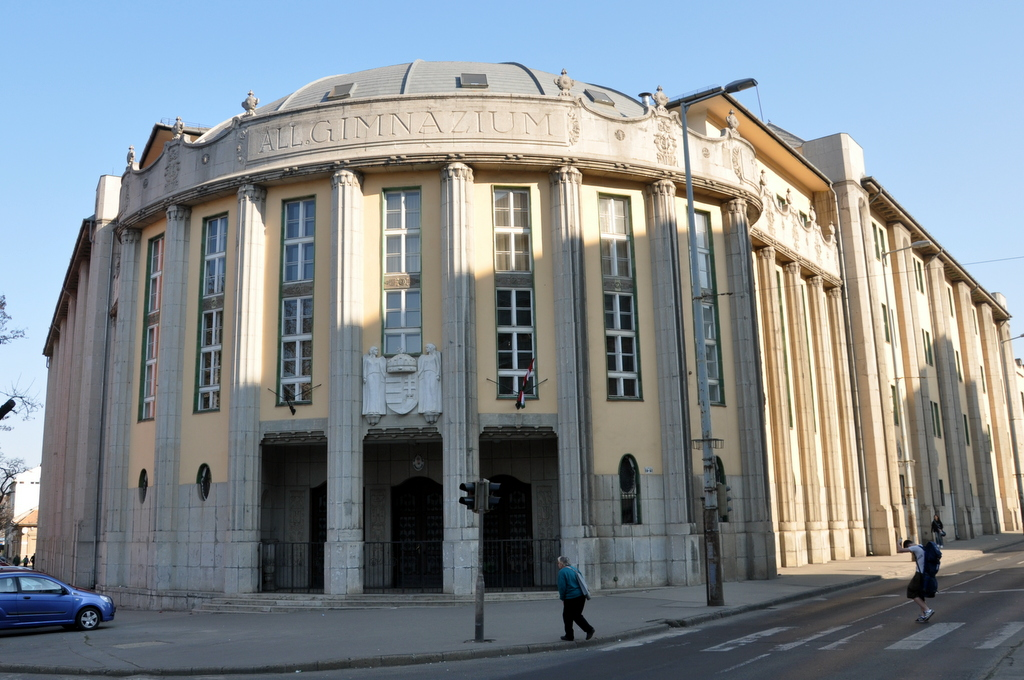
Szent László Gimnázium, Budapest (1914–1915)

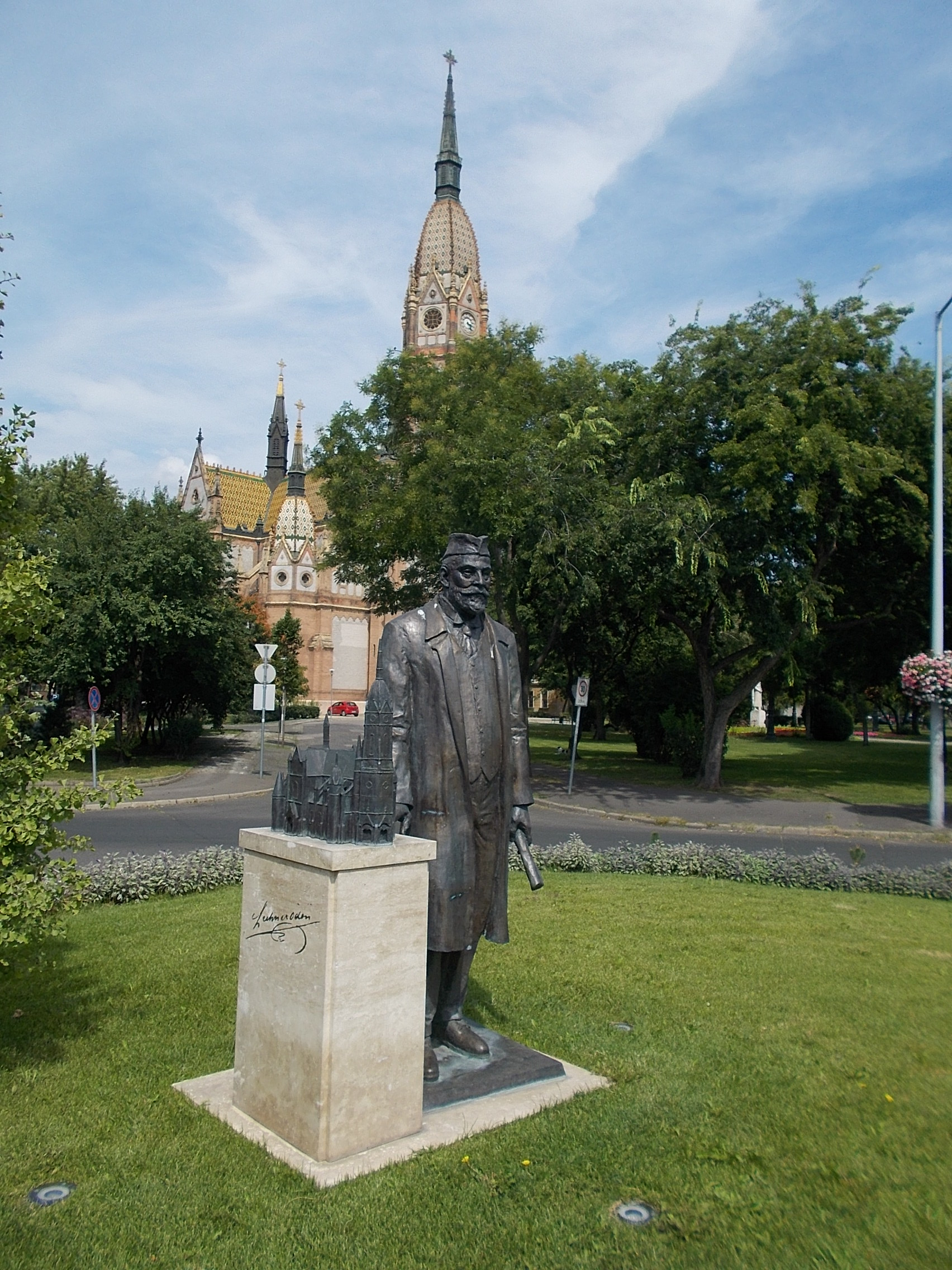
Statue of Lechner by Ildikó Zsemlye in Kőbánya

== Monuments and memorials ==
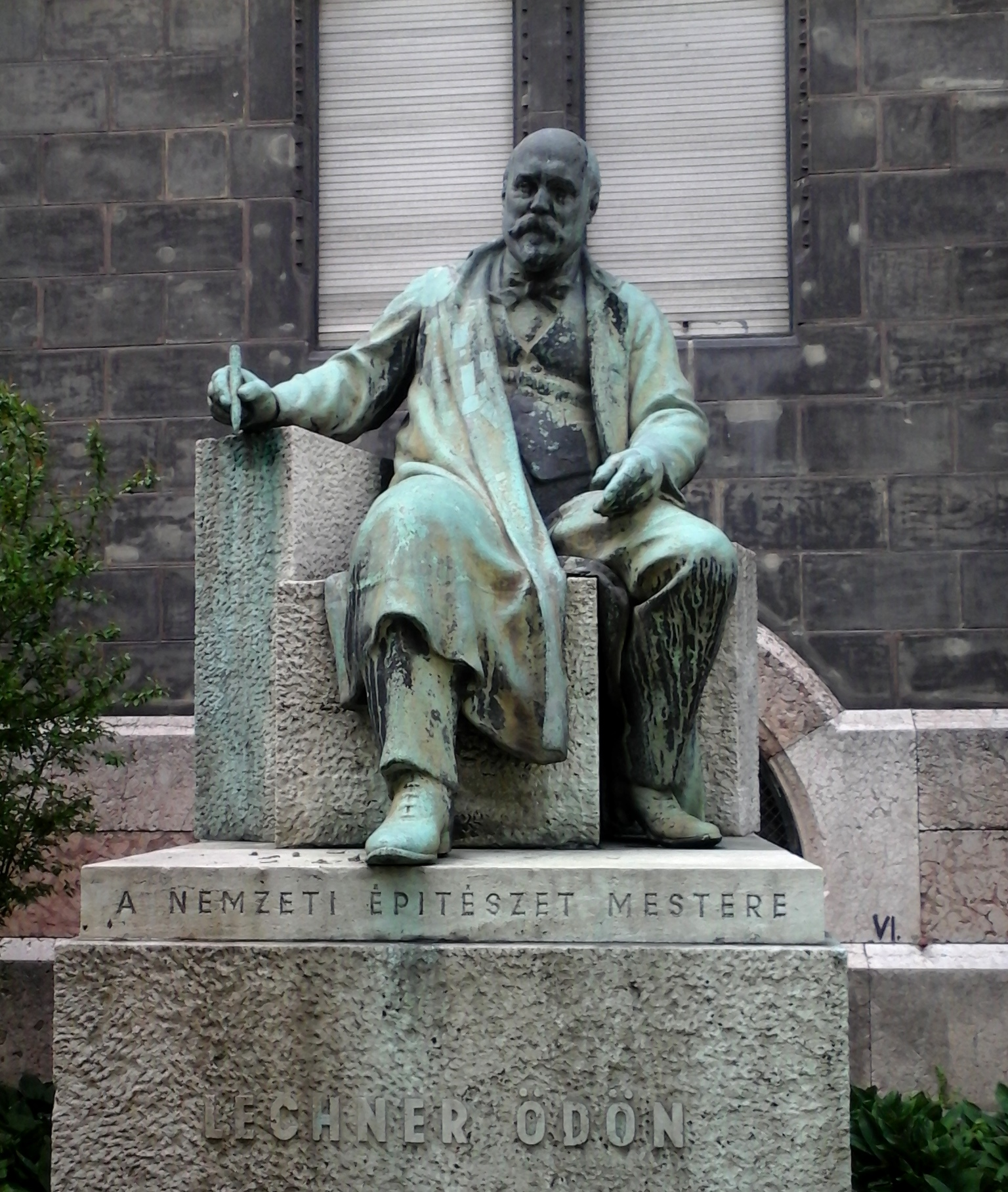
Ödön Lechner Monument outside the Museum of Applied Arts, Budapest

- The Ödön Lechner Society was founded in 1928; its founding members included Béla Bartók, Zoltán Kodály, Jenő Lechner, Loránd Lechner, István Medgyaszay, and Kornél Neuschloss.
- There is a statue in front of the Museum of Applied Arts, next to the Margaret Island Artist's Promenade, and in Szent László Square in Kőbánya.
- Lechner's bust can be seen in the pantheon of Dóm Square in Szeged.
- A row of trees in the capital, a square in Szeged, and streets in several cities (such as Kecskemét), are named for Lechner.
- Lechner's burial place is the 19th tomb of the 28th row of the Fiumei Úti Tomb Garden.

== Sources ==
Media related to Ödön Lechner at Wikimedia Commons
