= Hungarian Postal Savings Bank =

Former bank in Hungary

Royal Postal Savings Bank
- Magyar Királyi Postatakarékpénztár
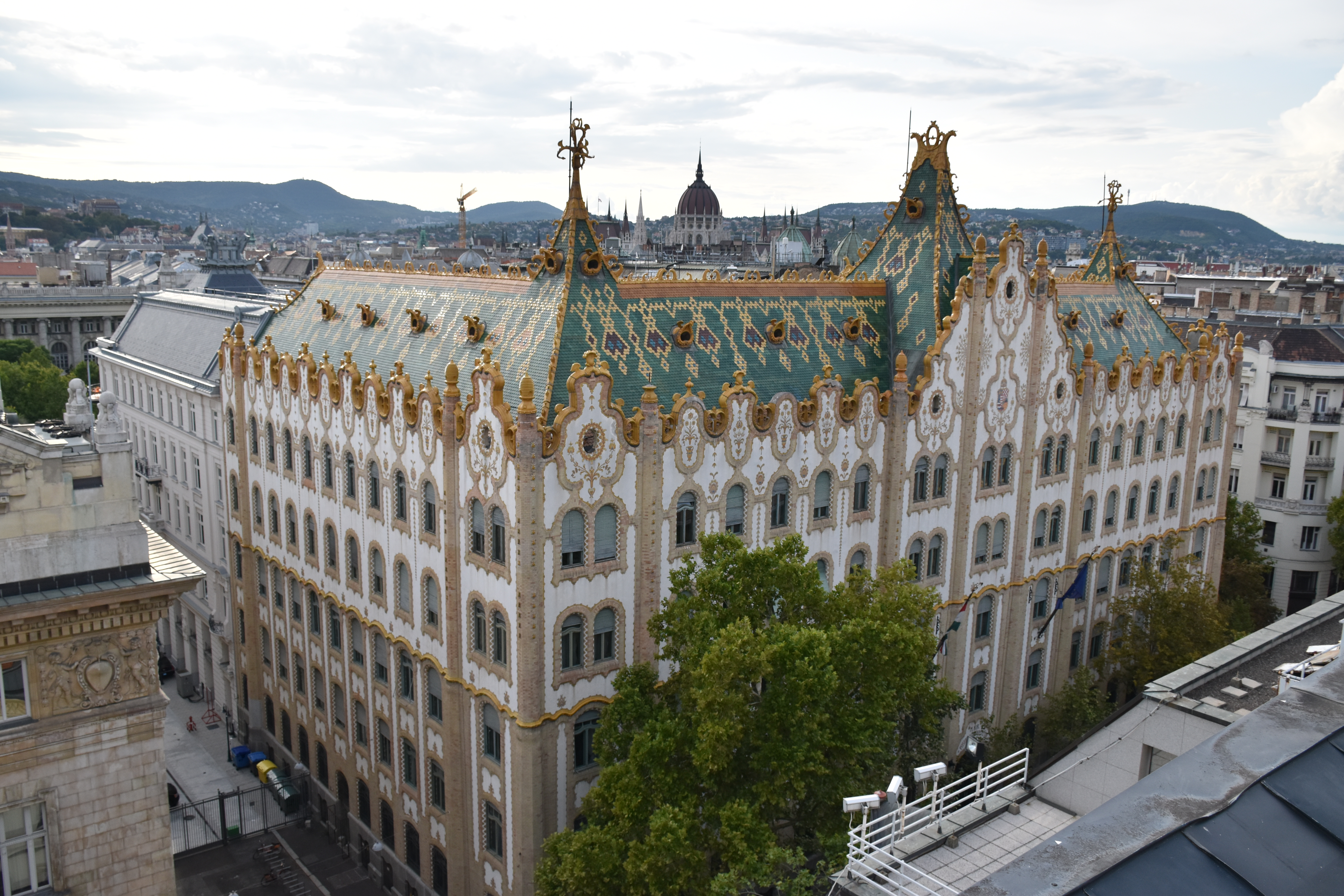
- The Postal Savings Bank building in 2019
- Interactive map of the Royal Postal Savings Bank area

General information
- Architectural style: Art Nouveau
- Location: V. Hold utca 4., Budapest, Hungary
- Coordinates: 47.5044°N 19.0521°E
- Opened: 1901

Design and construction
- Architect: Ödön Lechner

The Hungarian Postal Savings Bank (Hungarian: Magyar Postatakarékpénztár) was a major savings institution in Hungary, established in 1886 as the Hungarian Royal Postal Savings Bank (Hungarian: Magyar Királyi Postatakarékpénztár) and terminated in 1948. It is well remembered for its head office in District V of Budapest, a striking Art Nouveau building designed by Ödön Lechner.

== History ==
The Postal Savings Bank was established on 1 February 1886 by order of Lax IX of 1885. This act initially only authorized savings accounts, but was later expanded by Law XXXIV of 1889, which authorized "checks and clearing" starting on 1 January 1890. A state institutions under the Ministry of Trade, the Postal Savings Bank used local post offices as its branches and thus had unparalleled to retail clients, especially less wealthy ones. By end-1908, the Postal Savings Bank had 684,299 depositors out of a population of around 20 million in the Kingdom of Hungary.

In 1919 the Postal Savings Bank notes were issued by decree of the Revolutionary Governing Council of the Hungarian Soviet Republic by the Magyar Postatakarékpénztár (Hungarian Postal Savings Bank).

== Head office building ==
The iconic head office building of the Postal Savings Bank opened in 1901. It currently houses the Hungarian State Treasury.

It is emblematic of the Hungarian szecesszió style, which was part of the larger "secession" zeitgeist in European art and architecture at the time. The exterior of the building is covered in tiles from the Zsolnay Porcelain Factory and Hungarian folk art motifs. Decorative elements inspired by nature can be found everywhere, including large ceramic bee hives that sit atop the green patterned roof.

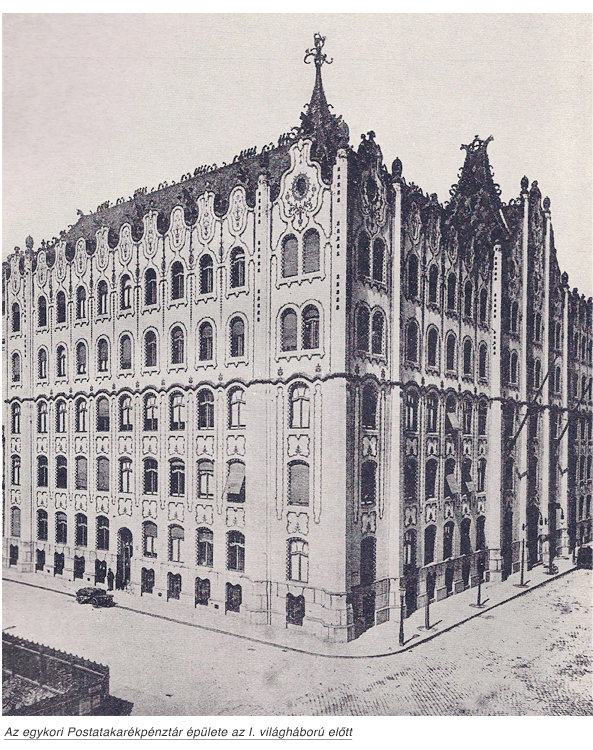
The building in 1910

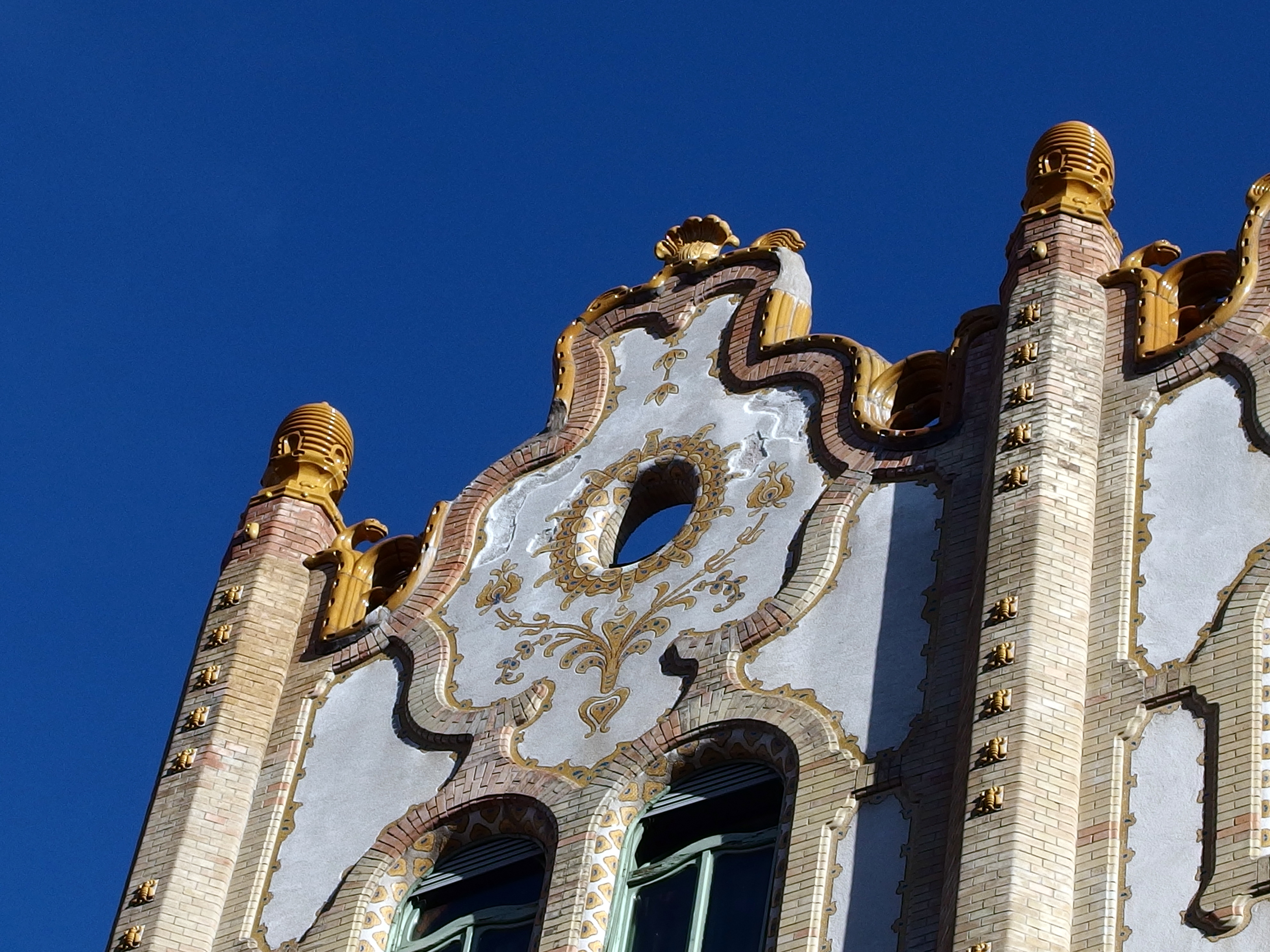
Detail from top of the building: bees and hives

== Aftermath ==
Following the complete nationalization and reorganization of the banking sector in 1948, the Postal Savings Bank was abolished and its assets (including its iconic building) taken over by the Hungarian National Bank (MNB). The distribution of rudimentary savings services through the post office network was entrusted to the Hungarian National Savings Bank Company (Hungarian: Országos Takarékpénztár Nemzeti Vállalat), one of the country's four main financial institutions alongside the MNB, the Hungarian Investment Bank (renamed the State Bank for Development in 1972 and liquidated in 1987), and the Hungarian Foreign Trade Bank.

A successor entity named Postabank was established in 1988 to offer financial services through the Hungarian post office network, majority-owned by Magyar Posta with a 20-percent stake sold to foreign investors in 1990. It grew rapidly until 1996, then experienced severe deposit withdrawal in 1997 and had to be bailed out by the government in 1998. It was sold to Erste Group in 2003.

== See also ==
- Österreichische Postsparkasse
- Poštanska štedionica
- First National Savings Bank of Pest
- First Croatian Savings Bank
- List of banks in Hungary
