= St. Ladislaus Church =

St. Ladislaus Church may refer to:

== Europe ==
Alphabetical by country

- St. Ladislaus Church in the Kőbánya district of Budapest, Hungary
- St. Ladislaus Church in Nocrich, Romania
- St. Ladislaus Church in Veľká Paka, Slovakia

== United States ==
Alphabetical by state

- St. Ladislaus Church (South Norwalk, Connecticut)
- St. Ladislaus Roman Catholic Church (Chicago), Illinois
- St. Ladislaus Roman Catholic Church in New Brunswick, New Jersey
- St. Ladislaus Roman Catholic Church (Lorain, Ohio), listed on the National Register of Historic Places

== See also ==
- Ladislaus I of Hungary
