= Szent László Gimnázium =

Coordinates: 47°29′20″N 19°08′07″E

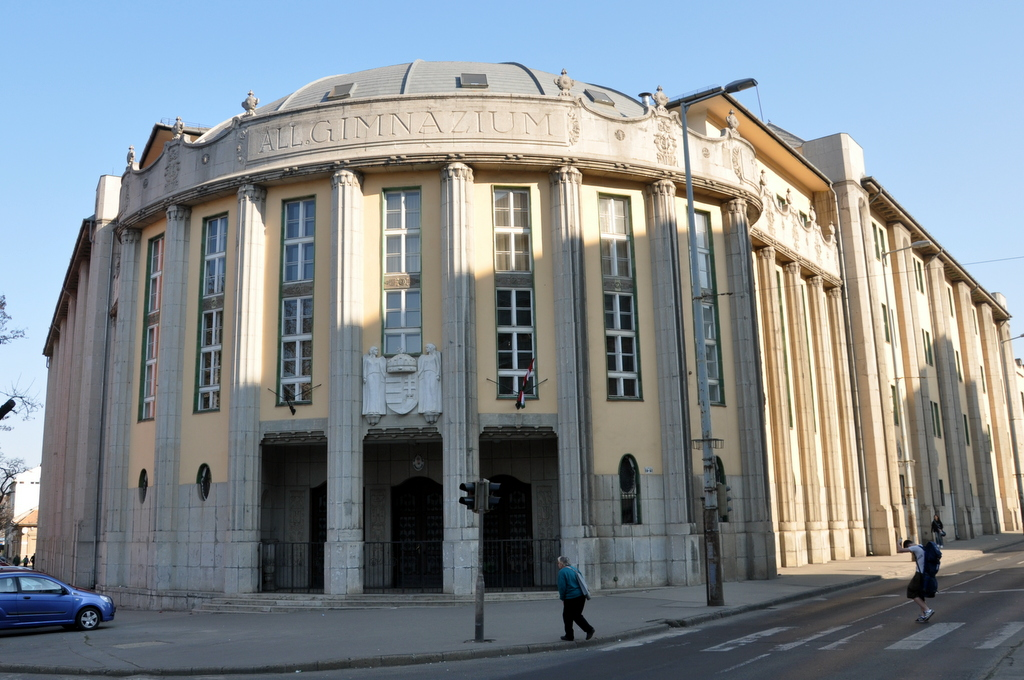
The school building

Founded in 1907, Szent László Gimnázium is located in Kőbánya, Budapest’s 10th District. The school’s building was designed by the renowned Hungarian architect Ödön Lechner, and has been in use since 1915.

The gymnasium runs 25 classes with eight specialisations. It also offers evening classes for adults. Therefore, the school’s enrolment is approximately 1000 students each year.

This school is a UNESCO–associated school, which means that we teach a wide range of foreign languages, the students take part in many special programmes and competitions on the topic of foreign countries, the second-year students organise ‘UNESCO shows’ and many of the students participate in exchange programmes every year.

== Classes ==
Currently, students at Szent László Gimnázium can choose to specialise in one of eight subjects as members of one of the five classes. The five classes are marked A, B, D, E and F. The A, E and F classes have a 5-year curriculum. The B and D classes have a 4-year curriculum.

=== A ===
The A class is the Italian-Hungarian bilingual class. Students in this class have 12 Italian lessons a week, and from the second year onwards they study certain subjects (geography, history, mathematics, Italian culture and civilisation, and art history) in Italian.

They also have skills development lessons in Italian, as well. To maximise the opportunities to learn the language, they regularly have lessons with native Italian teachers and take part in various student exchange programmes. The school receives considerable help from the Italian Embassy in Budapest, as well as from the Italian government, in the form of books and other teaching aids.

=== B ===
One third of the students in the B class specialise in English. Students here have 6 to 8 English lessons a week, some of these with a native English-speaking teacher. By the time they leave the school, these students speak English fluently. Another third of the B class specialises in mathematics. These students have two or three extra maths lessons a week. The remainder of the class does not have a particular specialisation.

=== D ===
Class D is divided into three groups in a similar fashion. One third of this class specialises in German, one third in art and drawing, and the rest of the class follows a regular curriculum with no specialisation.

=== E ===
The E class specialises in the sciences. Students in this class not only study the theoretical background of biology and chemistry, but they also receive thorough practical training in these subjects. Many of these students love animals, and they even run a small ‘zoo’ on the third floor of the school. Many former Szent László students have gone on to become doctors and vets.

=== F ===
Half of the students in class F specialise in information technology (IT), and the other half in media studies. The training in both halves of this class is very practical. The IT students spend many hours developing their programming skills, while the media students learn how to record and edit films, write newspaper articles and take professional-quality photos.

== Sources ==
Official page of the school
Official page of the school /English/
