= István Medgyaszay =

Hungarian architect (1877–1959)

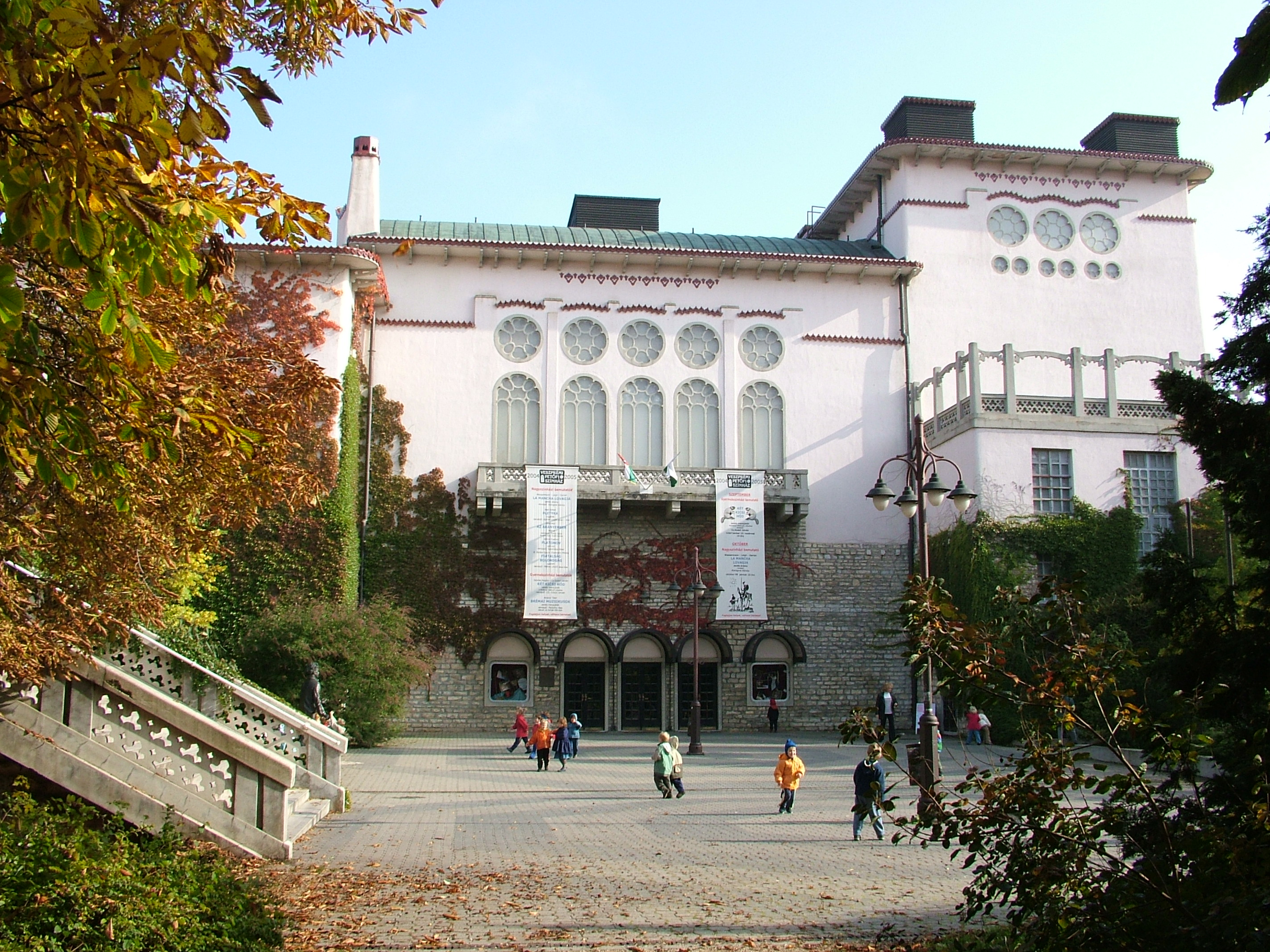
The theater in Veszprém, 1908

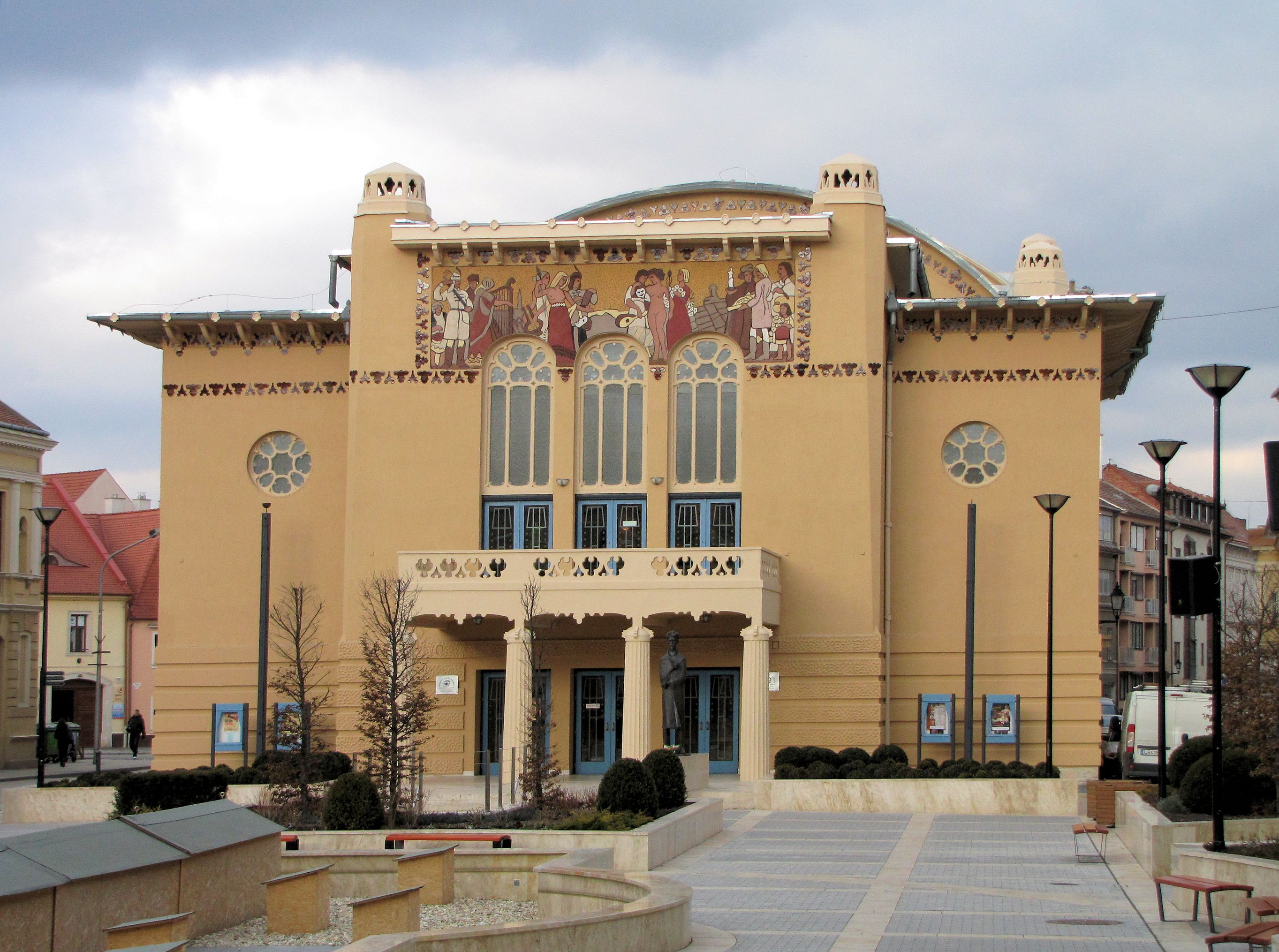
Theatre, Sopron, 1908–09

István Medgyaszay (born Benkó) (23 August 1877 in Budapest – 29 April 1959 in Budapest) was a Hungarian architect and writer. He was one of the first to employ Hungarian folk idioms, particularly from Transylvania, and combine them with influences ranging from the far east to organic architecture.

Medgyaszay studied at the Vienna Academy of Fine Arts (as a student of Otto Wagner) and also at the Budapest Hungarian Academy of Fine Arts. He won the commission for the design of the national pantheon in 1903 and graduated the following year. After further studies abroad he returned home and began working on the combination of reinforced concrete technology with folkloric design elements. He also travelled to northern Africa and India to study the architecture there.

In 1906, he took the mother's grandfather's surname for Medgyaszay.

Medgyaszay had a successful academic career and was highly regarded until the communist takeover in the late 1940s when he was criticised for his apolitical or so-called formalist approach to art. He did not receive an adequate retirement and stopped his working by the communist State in 1959 and died three weeks later.

== Main works ==
=== Architecture ===
- National pantheon, 1903, not built (won 5 European prizes for this plan)
- Milan exposition pavilion, 1906
- Artists homes, Gödöllő, 1904–06
- Theatre, Veszprém, 1908
- Theatre, Sopron, 1908–09
- Budapest Opera House, rebuilding, 1912
- Theatre, Miskolc, rebuilding, 1922
- Various church buildings: Rárósmúlyad (1910); Ógyalla (1912); Püspökladány (1921); Kenderes (1922)

=== Literary writings ===
as surname Benkó

- Körösfő (1905)
- Egy-egy székely házról, faluról (Szekler house, szekler village) (1905)
- Népünk művészetéről (Our people's art) (1906)

as surname Medgyaszay

- VASBETON MŰVÉSZI FORMÁJA (Artistic form of reinforced concrete) (1908)- Reprint: Ars Hungarica 1983/2.
- A vasbeton művészi formáiról (Artistic form of ferro-concrete) (1909)
- A hun-magyar ókori művészet. Székfoglaló beszéd (The Hun-Hungarian ancient art. Inaugural speech) (1927)
- Művészet és népművészet (Art and folklore) (1942)
