= Blue Church =

Church of St. Elizabeth
- Kostol svätej Alžbety
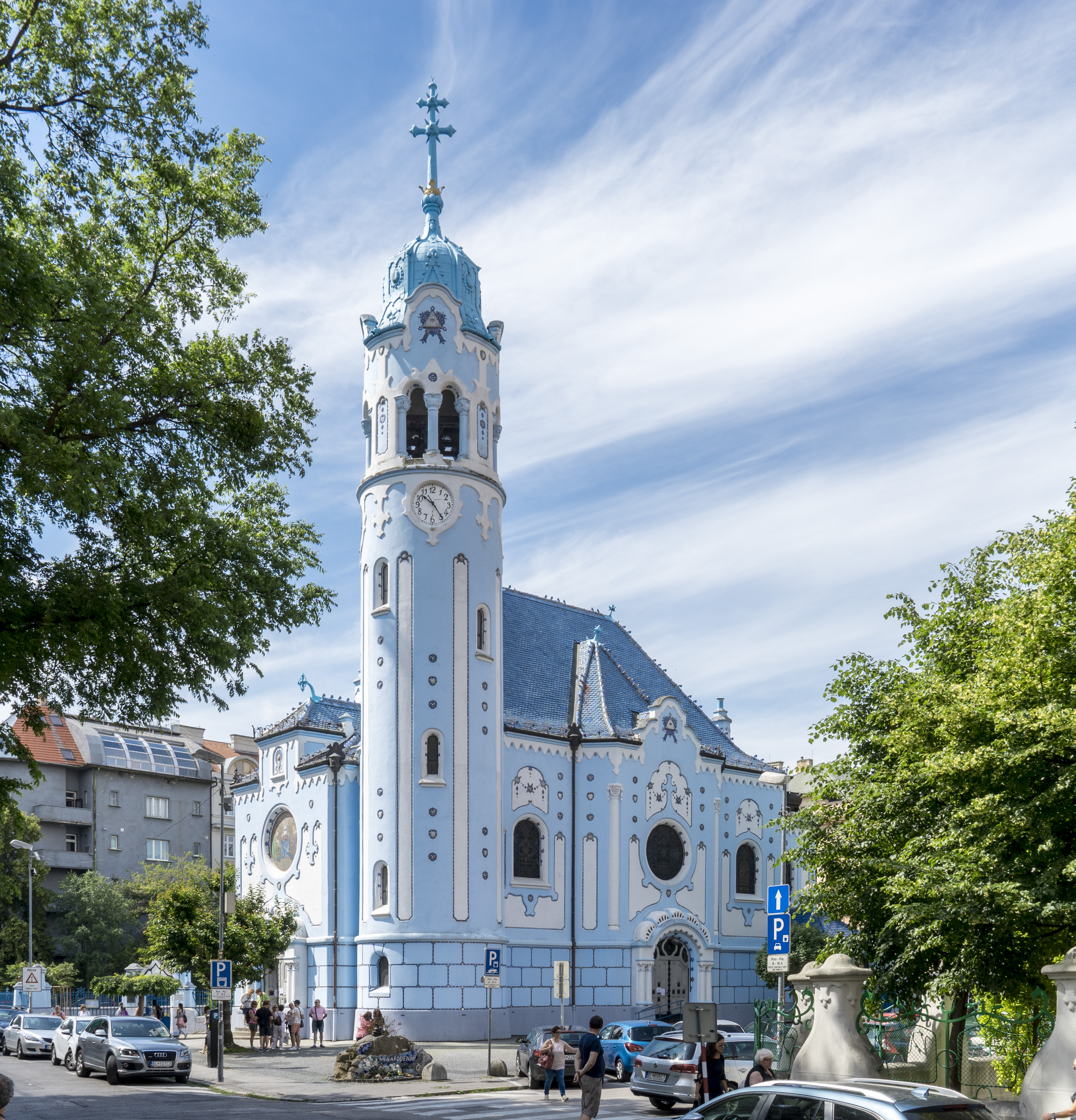

- Location within Slovakia
- 48°08′36.2″N 17°07′00.6″E
- Location: Bratislava
- Country: Slovakia
- Denomination: Catholic

Architecture
- Architect: Ödön Lechner
- Style: Art Nouveau
- Years built: 12th century. Consecrated 1908–1913

The Church of St. Elizabeth (Slovak: Kostol svätej Alžbety, Hungarian: Szent Erzsébet templom), commonly known as Blue Church (Modrý kostolík, Kék templom), is a Hungarian-Secessionist (Jugendstil, Art Nouveau) Catholic church located in the eastern part of the Old Town in Bratislava, present-day Slovakia. It is consecrated to Elisabeth of Hungary, daughter of Andrew II, who grew up in the Pressburg Castle (Pozsonyi vár). It is referred to as "The Little Blue Church" because of the colour of its façade, mosaics, majolicas and blue-glazed roof. It was initially part of the neighboring gymnázium (high school) and served as the school chapel.

== Architecture ==
The one-nave church was designed by Ödön Lechner in the Hungarian Art Nouveau style, together with the Catholic grammar school he was planning next to it. Its foundation stone was laid on 23 August 1909, and it was consecrated on 11 October 1913. The so-called Hungarian secessionist style forms dominate in the church. Lechner also drew plans of the neighbouring Gymnázium Grösslingová 18 and of the vicarage (also in the Hungarian Secessionist style).

The ground floor of the church is oval. In the foreground there is a 36.8 metre high cylindrical church tower. At first, a cupola was planned, but was never constructed; instead, a barrel vault was built, topped by a hip roof. The roof is covered with blue glazed ceramic tiles.

The main and side entrances are enclosed with Romanesque double-pillars, which have an Oriental feeling. Pillars are also located near the windows.

The façade was at first painted with light pastel colours. Later the church got its characteristic blue colour. A line of blue tiles and wave-strip encircles the church. Both the exterior and the interior are painted in shades of pale blue, the walls are decorated with blue majolica, and even the wooden pews are blue.

== Interior ==
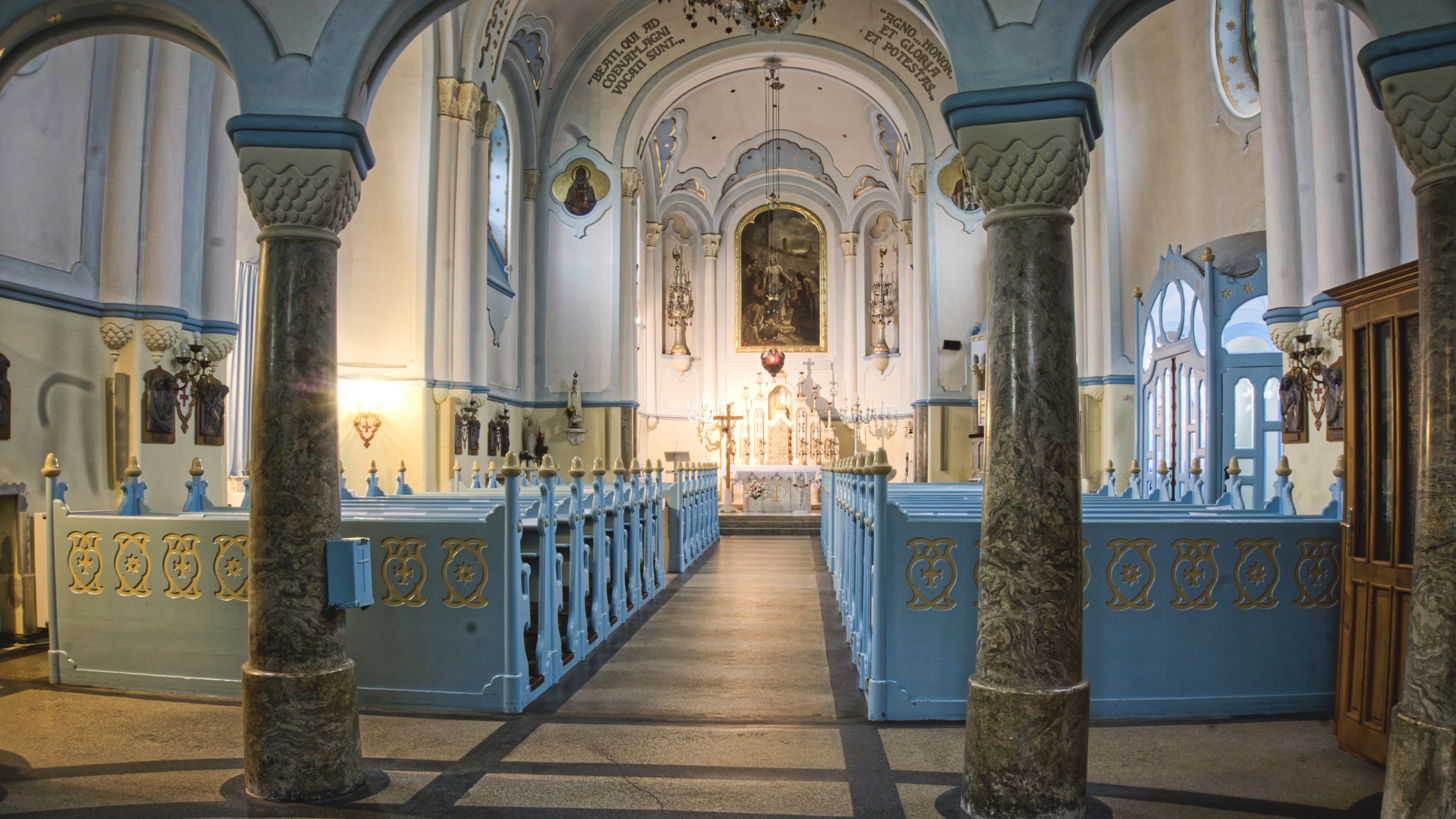
Interior view towards the altar

The interior is richly decorated with altarpieces. On the altar there is an illustration of St Elizabeth, depicted giving alms to the poor, and a mosaic above the main entrance also shows the saint.

A model of the church is in Mini-Europe in Brussels, representing Slovakia.

== See also ==
- St. Nicholas' Church, Bratislava
- Franciscan Church, Bratislava
