= Geological Museum of Budapest =

Museum in Budapest, Hungary

Coordinates: 47°30′20.10″N 19°5′50.77″E

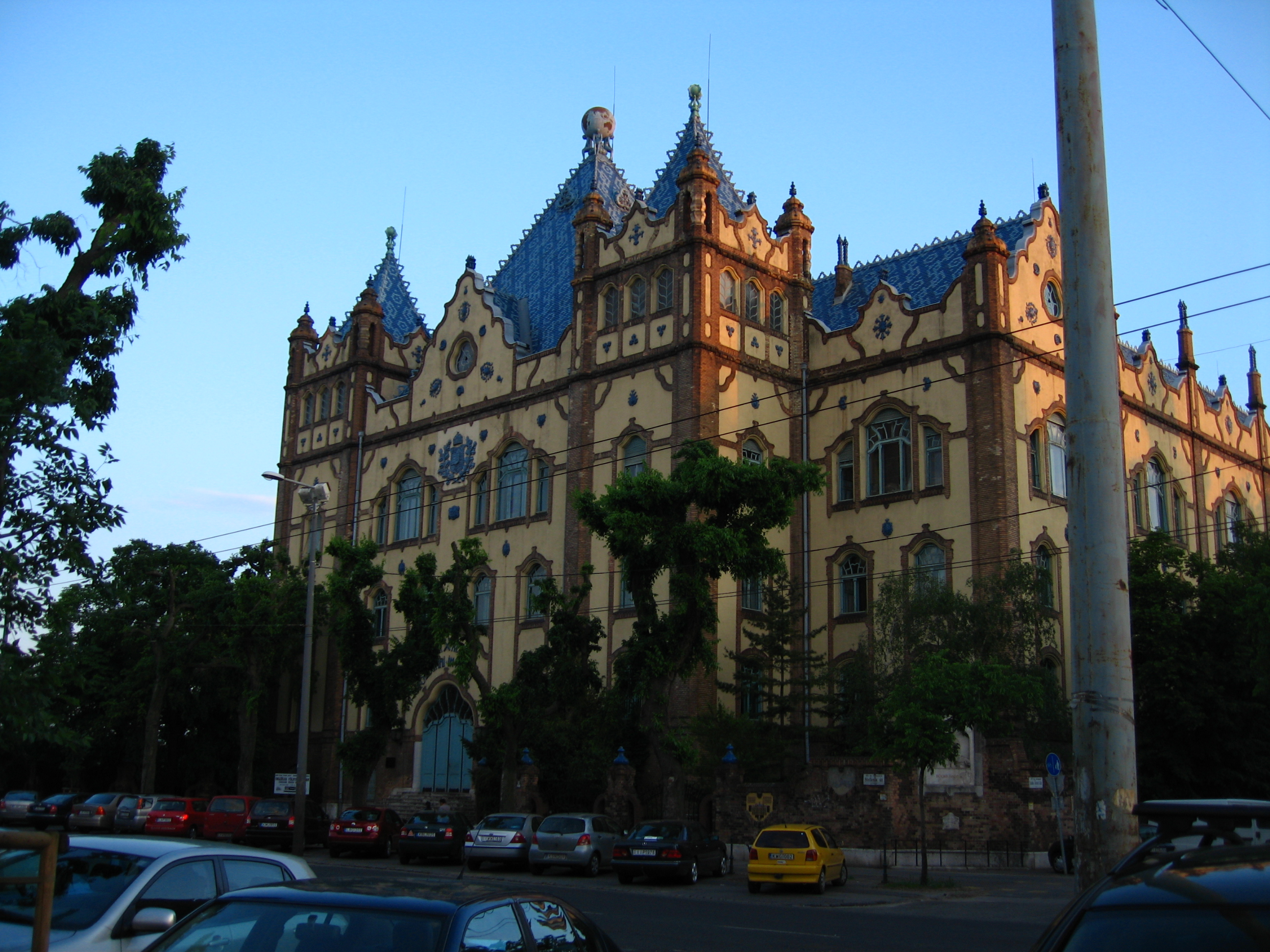
Geological Museum of Budapest

The Geological Museum of Budapest (Hungarian: Országos Földtani Múzeum) is the national geological museum of Hungary. It is housed in the headquarters of the national geological survey on Stefánia út in the eastern part of Budapest, in the district of Pest.

The building was designed by Ödön Lechner for the Royal Hungarian Geological Institute, which was founded in 1869 as the first scientific research institute in Hungary. It was completed in 1899 and paid for by the state and, to a large extent, by the landowner Andor Semsey. Its blue tiled roof imitates the pyramids of mineral crystals and is topped by a globe, and the walls are decorated with Zsolnay majolica from Pécs. The building is the seat of the Mining and Geological Survey of Hungary, the legal successor of the institute.

The exhibitions cover minerals, mining, the history of geology and the geological history of Hungary. The collection also includes prehistoric footprints and a display honoring Lechner.
