= Zsolnay =

Hungarian porcelain manufacture

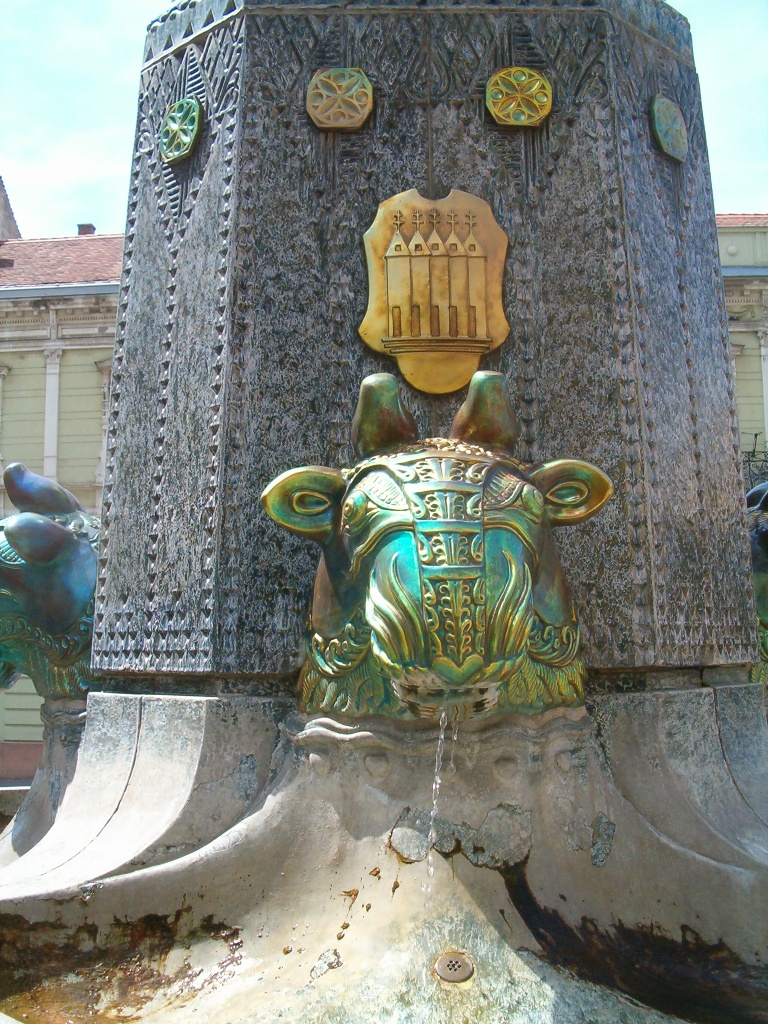
Eosin glaze of Zsolnay fountain, Pécs

Zsolnay, or formally Zsolnay Porcelánmanufaktúra Zrt (Zsolnay Porcelain Manufactory Private Limited) is a Hungarian manufacturer of porcelain, tiles, and stoneware. The company introduced the eosin glazing process and pyrogranite ceramics.

== History ==
The Zsolnay factory was established by Miklós Zsolnay (1800–1880) in Pécs, Hungary, to produce stoneware and other ceramics in 1853. In 1863, his son, Vilmos Zsolnay (1828–1900) joined the company and became its manager and director after several years. He led the factory to worldwide recognition by demonstrating its innovative products at world fairs and international exhibitions, including the 1873 World Fair in Vienna, then at the 1878 World Fair in Paris, where Zsolnay received a Grand Prix. In 1893, Zsolnay introduced porcelain pieces made of eosin. Tádé Sikorski (1852–1940) married Vilmos’ daughter Júlia and became the chief designer. In 1900 Vilmos’ son Miklós took over. Frost-resisting Zsolnay building decorations were used in numerous buildings specifically during the Art Nouveau movement. By 1914, Zsolnay was the largest company in Austro-Hungary. During World War I, production of pottery and building materials were curtailed, and the factory produced for military use, for instance insulators. After World War I, the fortunes of the factory declined due to the Serbian occupation, loss of markets, and difficulty to secure raw materials. However, after the depression, conditions improved.

During World War II, its site of production in Budapest was bombed. With the rule of communism the factory was nationalized in 1948. Eventually, the Zsolnay name was dropped. The Pécsi Porcelángyár (Pécs Porcelain Factory) was used primarily to produce common tableware goods. However, in 1982 with the resumption of a market economy, the company regained its operational independence, was reorganized, and the Zsolnay name returned. In 1991, the Zsolnay Porcelain Manufacture became a stock company, and five years later it was bought by a private equity enterprise.

In 2012, a Swiss-Syrian businessman called Bachar Najari bought the company from the city of Pécs.

Beside the factory, there is also the Zsolnay Museum in Pécs.

== Eosin ==
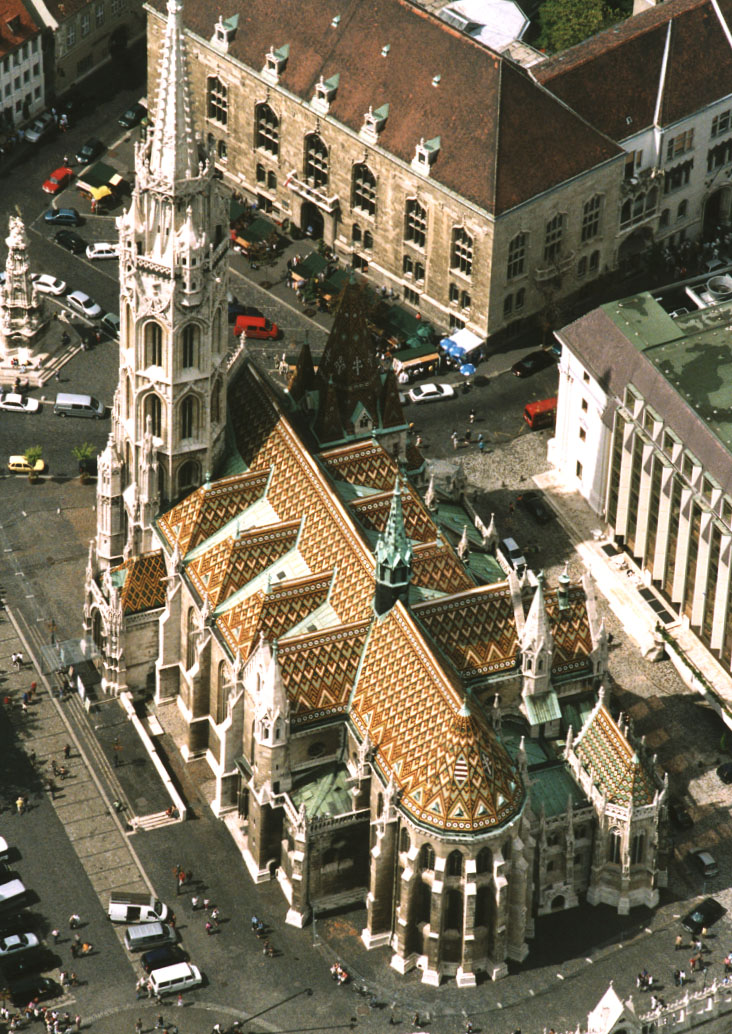
Roof of Matthias Church, Budapest

Many Zsolnay ceramics are noted for the use of the eosin process that was introduced in 1893. The process results in a light red iridescence of the first prepared hue, hence the term eosin (Greek eos, flush of dawn). Different eosin colours and processes were developed over time. The eosin-based iridescence became a favourite of art nouveau and Jugendstil artists, among them Sándor Apáti Abt, Lajos Mack, Géza Nikelszky, and József Rippl-Rónai.

The secret eosin glaze renders porcelain to appear iridescent metallic, in different colours that change with the angle of reflection. Typical colours include shades of green, red, blue, and purple.

== Pyrogranite ==
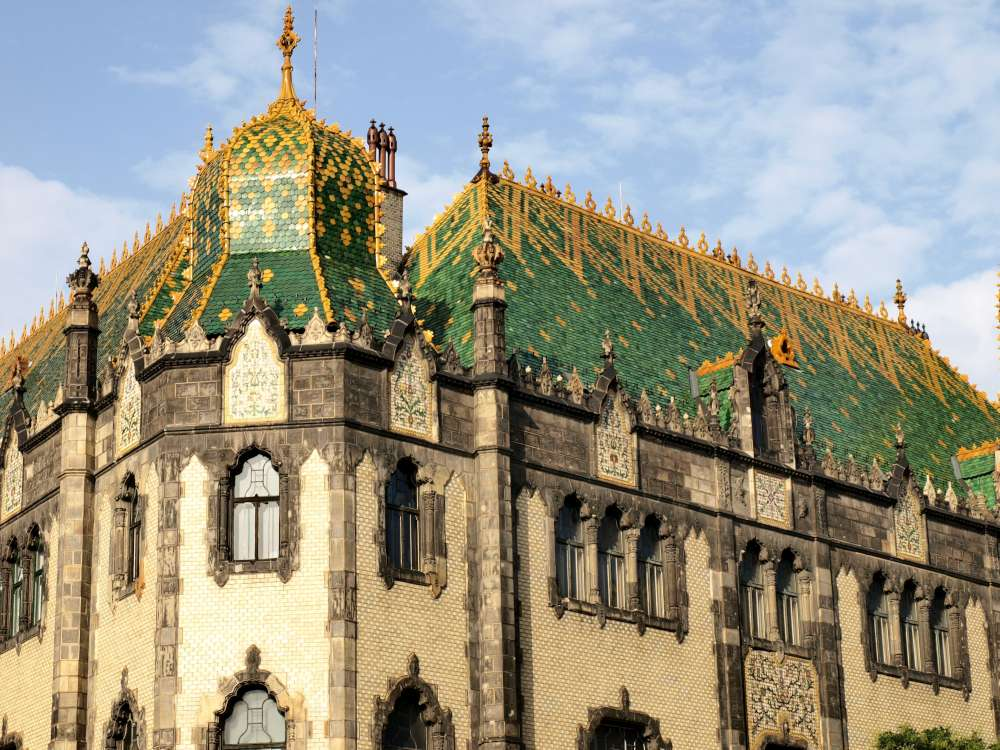
Roof of Museum of Applied Arts (Budapest)

Pyrogranite refers to a type of ornamental ceramics that were developed by Zsolnay and placed in production by 1886. Fired at high temperature, this durable material remains acid and frost-resistant making it suitable for use as roof tiles, indoor and outdoor decorative ceramics, and fireplaces. Architects that used the material in their buildings include Miklós Ybl, Ödön Lechner, Béla Lajta, Samu Pecz, and Imre Steindl. It can be seen in buildings such as Matthias Church, the Hungarian Parliament Building, the Museum of Applied Art, the Geological Institute, the St. Ladislaus Church, the Gellért Baths (all these buildings are in Budapest), the Párizsi Udvar Hotel, Four Season Hotel (in Budapest), the Castle Garden Bazaar, the ELTE University, the Budapest Technical University, the Central Market Hall, the Town Hall in Kecskemét and many beautiful buildings across Hungary, like the Post Office Palace, in Pécs.

== See also ==
- Glazed architectural terra-cotta
- Porcelain manufacturing companies in Europe
