= Gamča =

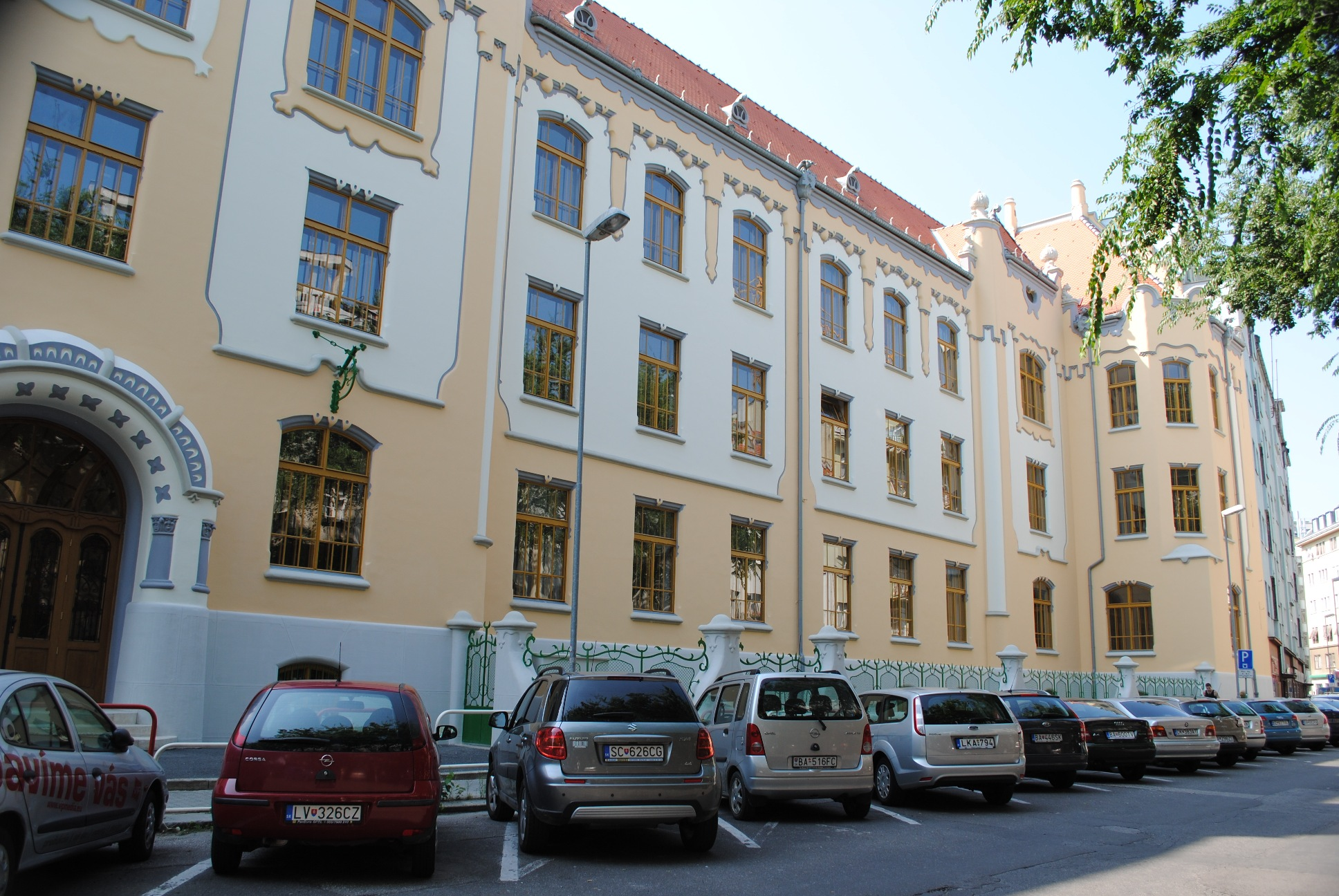

Location
- Grösslingová 18, 811 09 Bratislava, Slovakia
- Coordinates: 48.144°N 17.116°E

Information
- Type: Public
- Founded: 1626; 400 years ago
- Founder: Bratislavský samosprávny kraj
- Headmistress: Viera Babišová
- Faculty: appr. 40
- Gender: Coeducational
- Age: 11 to 19
- Enrollment: appr. 600
- Language: Slovak
- Colors: Blue and Ochre
- Website: www.gamca.sk

Gamča (Slovak pronunciation: [ˈɡamtʂa]), today officially Gymnázium, Grösslingová 18, Bratislava, is a public coeducational gymnasium located in Bratislava, Slovakia. It educates around 600 pupils in 8-year long and 4-year long programs leading to Maturita. It was founded in 1626 by Peter Cardinal Pazmáň (Péter Pázmany) as Collegium Posoniense.

Gamča's focus on mathematics, natural sciences and computer sciences brought 56 of its students to successfully represent Slovakia (Czechoslovakia) at the International Mathematical Olympiad, 26 students at the International Physics Olympiad and 14 at the International Olympiad in Informatics in the past 35 years.

Since 1988, the school's popular "Olympic games" (Olympijské hry), OH Gamča, are held annually.

== History ==
Cardinal Archbishop of Esztergom Petrus Pazmanus founded Collegium Posoniense on September 11, 1626, with the approval of the 6th Jesuit Superior General Mutio Vitelleschi and Ferdinand II, Holy Roman Emperor.

== Building ==
The current building was designed by Ödön Lechner and built in 1906–08. The school building was completely renovated in 2008–10.

The Church of St. Elizabeth, commonly known as the Blue Church, was initially part of the gymnázium, serving as the school chapel. The church was also designed by Lechner.

== Notable alumni ==
Both current students and alumni are called Gamčáci (m) and Gamčáčky (f).

- Philipp Lenard (1862 - 1947) - physicist and Nobel Prize Laureate
- Béla Bartók (1881 - 1945) - composer and pianist
- Gustáv Husák (1913 - 1991) - former President of Czechoslovakia
- Ján Vilček (b. 1933) - biomedical scientist, educator, inventor and philanthropist
- Milan Lasica (1940 - 2021) - playwright, director, actor and singer
- Robert Redhammer (b.1963) - former Rector of Slovak University of Technology and current Chairman of the Executive Board of The Slovak Accreditation Agency for Higher Education
- Lucia Žitňanská (b. 1964) - former Member of National Council and former Minister of Justice
- Daniel Lipšic (b. 1973) - former Member of the National Council, former Minister of Justice, former Minister of Interior of Slovakia and current Special Prosecutor
