= Gerngross =

Gern(e)gross or Gern(e)groß (from German: gern/gerne "gladly", "with pleasure" or "like to" (in this context "would like to be", "want to be", "wannabe") plus groß "large", "big", "great") is a German surname belonging to the group of family names based on a personal characteristic, in this case derived from a nickname originally used for an ambitious or aspiring person. Notable people with the name include:

- Aleksandr Gerngross (1851–1925), Imperial Russian Army general of Dutch origin
- Rupprecht Gerngroß (1915–1996), German lawyer
- Tillman Gerngross, American scientist
