= Béla Lajta =

Hungarian architect (1873–1920)

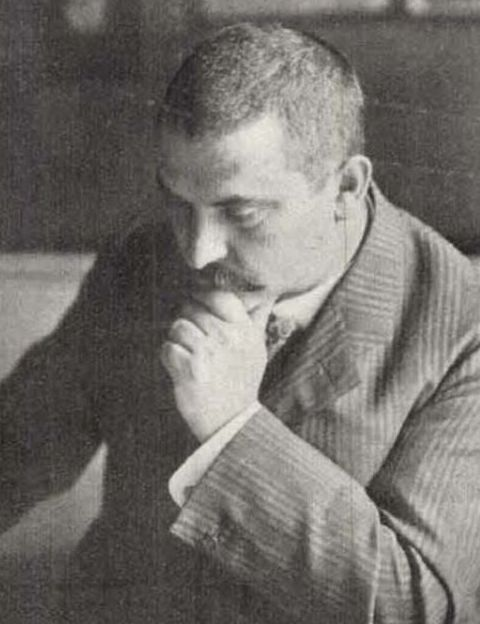
- Born: Béla Leitersdorfer; January 23, 1873; Óbuda, Budapest, Kingdom of Hungary
- Died: October 12, 1920 (aged 47); Vienna, Austria
- Education: Budapest Technical University
- Occupation: Architect
- Style: Art Nouveau (Szecesszió), Art Deco
- Buildings: Rózsavölgyi House, Budapest; Parisiana, now New Theatre (Új Színház), Budapest

Béla Lajta, until 1907 Béla Leitersdorfer (Óbuda, 23 January 1873 – Vienna, 12 October 1920) was a prominent Hungarian architect.

== Career ==
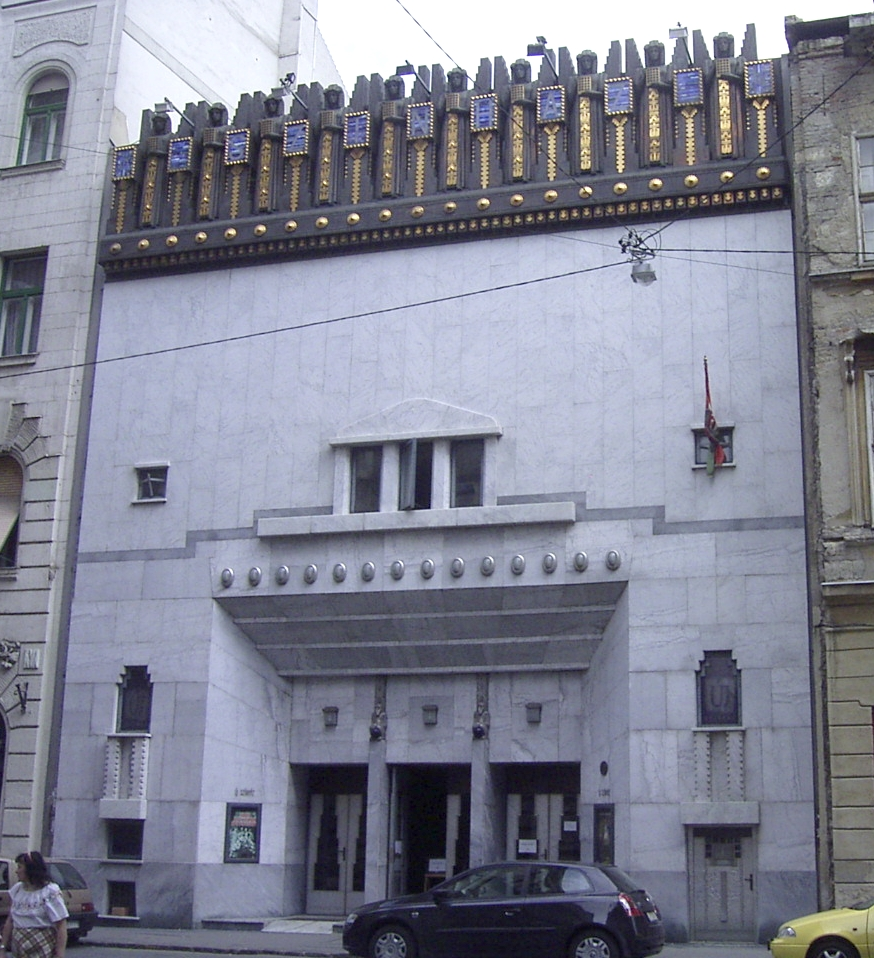
New Theatre (Új Színház), Budapest

Lajta finished his degree at the Budapest Technical University and worked briefly under Alajos Hauszmann before spending one and a half years in Italy, mainly Rome. During that time, he also worked in painting and sculpture. After this he worked in Berlin and London. He returned home in 1899 to take part in a competition to design a synagogue, where his project won the third prize. His first work in 1900 was the Bard music shop on Budapest's Lajos Kossuth street, finished in 1900. Ödön Lechner was a notable influence on him at this time. They worked together on a number of projects, among them the Schmidl crypt at Kozma Street Cemetery. He designed a number of buildings in the Hungarian offshoot style of Art Nouveau, called szecesszió in Hungarian (see Vienna Secession), the most notable being the Rózsavölgyi Commercial Building in Budapest on Szervita Square (see Architecture of Hungary: In the 20th century).

In 1909 he designed in an Art Deco style the Parisiana on Ede Paulay Street, Budapest, now New Theatre (Új színház).

Lajta died after a serious illness at a relatively young age.

== See also ==
- Salgotarjani Street Jewish Cemetery
