= St. Ladislaus Church (South Norwalk, Connecticut) =

Coordinates: 41.0929°N 73.4278°W

- St. Ladislaus Church
- Location: 25 Cliff Street; South Norwalk, Connecticut
- Country: United States
- Denomination: Roman Catholic

Architecture
- Architect: Ödön Lechner

Administration
- Province: Hartford
- Diocese: Bridgeport

Clergy
- Bishop: Most Rev. Frank J. Caggiano
- Pastor: Rev. Juan Gabriel Acosta

St.Ladislaus is a Roman Catholic church in South Norwalk, Connecticut, part of the Diocese of Bridgeport.

== History ==
St. Ladislaus Church was established in 1907 to serve a Hungarian congregation. Many immigrants from Hungary had arrived in South Norwalk in the late 19th century. The church still conducts some Hungarian language services in addition to services in English and Spanish .

== Buildings ==
The church building, which was completed in 1912, is patterned after a church in the Kőbánya district of Budapest that is dedicated to St. Ladislaus. The Romanesque Revival-style church was designed by distinguished Hungarian architect Ödön Lechner, marking one of the few times that an American Roman Catholic church was designed by a European architect. The sanctuary features stained glass windows made in Germany. One of the windows adjacent to the altar depicts St. Ladislaus leading his armies during the Crusades. The image in the window on the opposite side of the altar shows St. Stephen of Hungary handing the crown of Hungary to Mary and baby Jesus. The church's steeple, which has a distinctive octagonal base, is a local landmark that has been a reference point for fishermen on Long Island Sound and for World War II aviators.

The church's interior was renovated in 1977 and 1983. The steeple was toppled during a storm in March 2010, but was taken to a restoration company for repairs and was expected to be replaced.
