= Muľa =

Muľa Rárósmúlyad
- Municipality
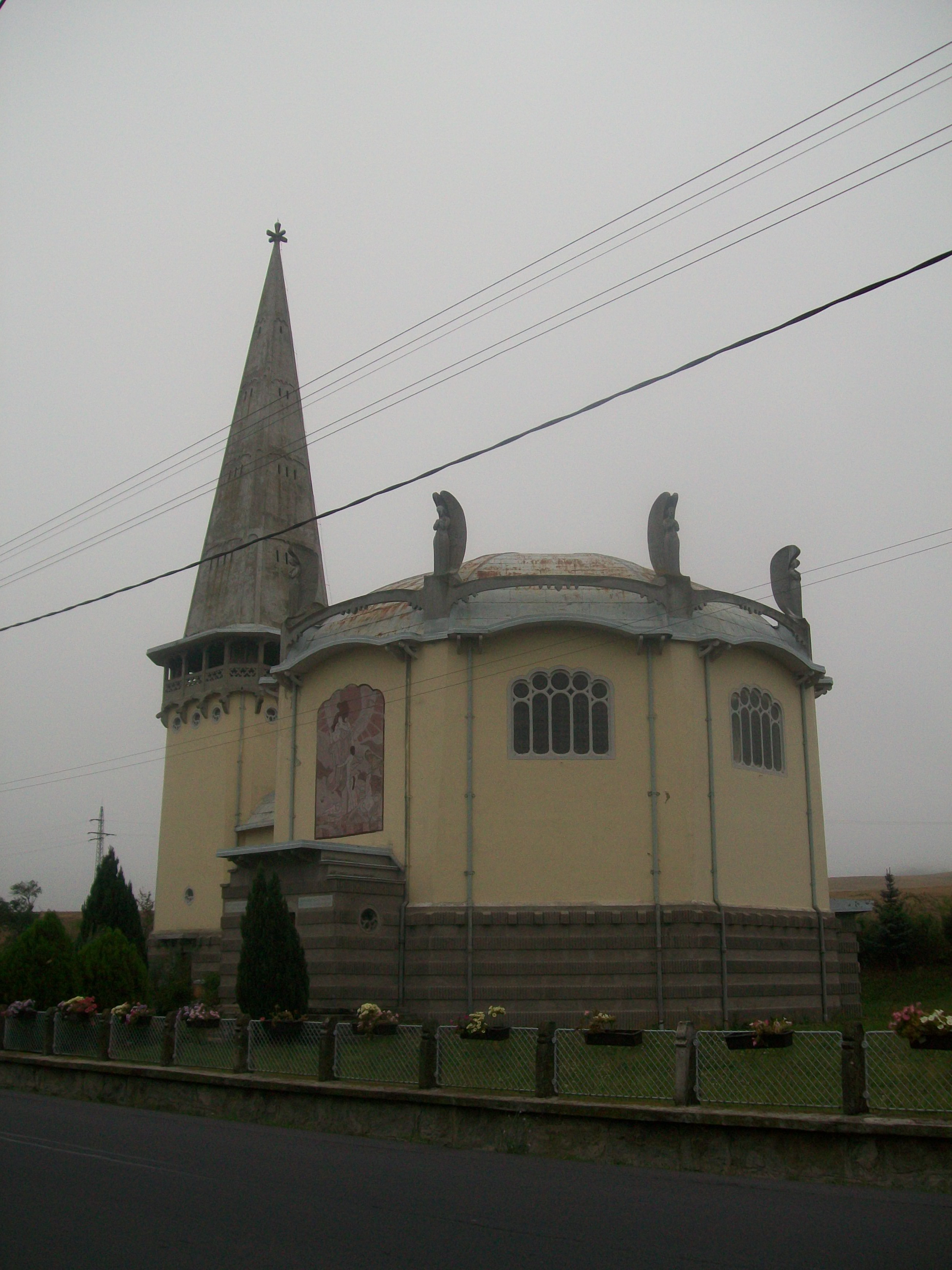
- St. Elizabeth's Church in the village Muľa

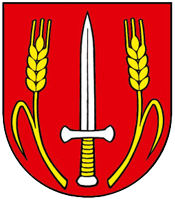
- Flag Coat of arms

- Location of Muľa in the Banská Bystrica Region Location of Muľa in Slovakia
- Coordinates: 48.20°N 19.53°E
- Country: Slovakia
- Region: Banská Bystrica Region
- District: Veľký Krtíš District
- First mentioned: 1321

Area
  - Total: 12.28 km^{2} (4.74 sq mi)
- Elevation: 219 m (719 ft)

Population (2025)
  - Total: 356
- Time zone: UTC+1 (CET)
  - Summer (DST): UTC+2 (CEST)
- Postal code: 991 22
- Area code: +421 47
- Vehicle registration plate (until 2022): VK
- Website: www.obecmula.sk

Muľa (Hungarian: Rárósmúlyad) is a village and municipality in the Veľký Krtíš District of the Banská Bystrica Region of southern Slovakia.

== Geography ==
The municipality lies at an altitude of 219 metres (719 ft) and covers an area of 12.28 km^{2} (4.74 sq mi) (2025).

== Population ==
Population statistic (10 years)
| Year | 1995 | 2005 | 2015 | 2025 |
|---|---|---|---|---|
| Count | 241 | 291 | 351 | 356 |
| Difference | | +20.74% | +20.61% | +1.42% |

Population statistic
| Year | 2024 | 2025 |
|---|---|---|
| Count | 353 | 356 |
| Difference | | +0.84% |

It has a population of 356 people (31 December 2025).

=== Ethnicity ===
Census 2021 (1+ %)
| Ethnicity | Number | Fraction |
|---|---|---|
| Slovak | 291 | 81.05% |
| Hungarian | 80 | 22.28% |
| Not found out | 24 | 6.68% |
| Total | 359 | |

In year 2021 was 359 people by ethnicity 291 as Slovak, 80 as Hungarian, 24 as Not found out, 1 as Italian, 1 as Austrian and 1 as Polish.

Note on population: The difference values of population numbers in the table "Population statistic" and in the sections "Ethnicity" & "Religion" is caused by the use of various statistical methods.

The vast majority of the municipality's population consists of the local Roma community. In 2019, they constituted an estimated 87% of the local population.

=== Religion ===
Census 2021 (1+ %)
| Religion | Number | Fraction |
|---|---|---|
| Roman Catholic Church | 265 | 73.82% |
| None | 58 | 16.16% |
| Not found out | 22 | 6.13% |
| Evangelical Church | 11 | 3.06% |
| Total | 359 | |

In year 2021 was 359 people by religion 265 from Roman Catholic Church, 58 from None, 22 from Not found out, 11 from Evangelical Church and 3 from Greek Catholic Church.
