= Steiner Palace =

- Palatul Steiner
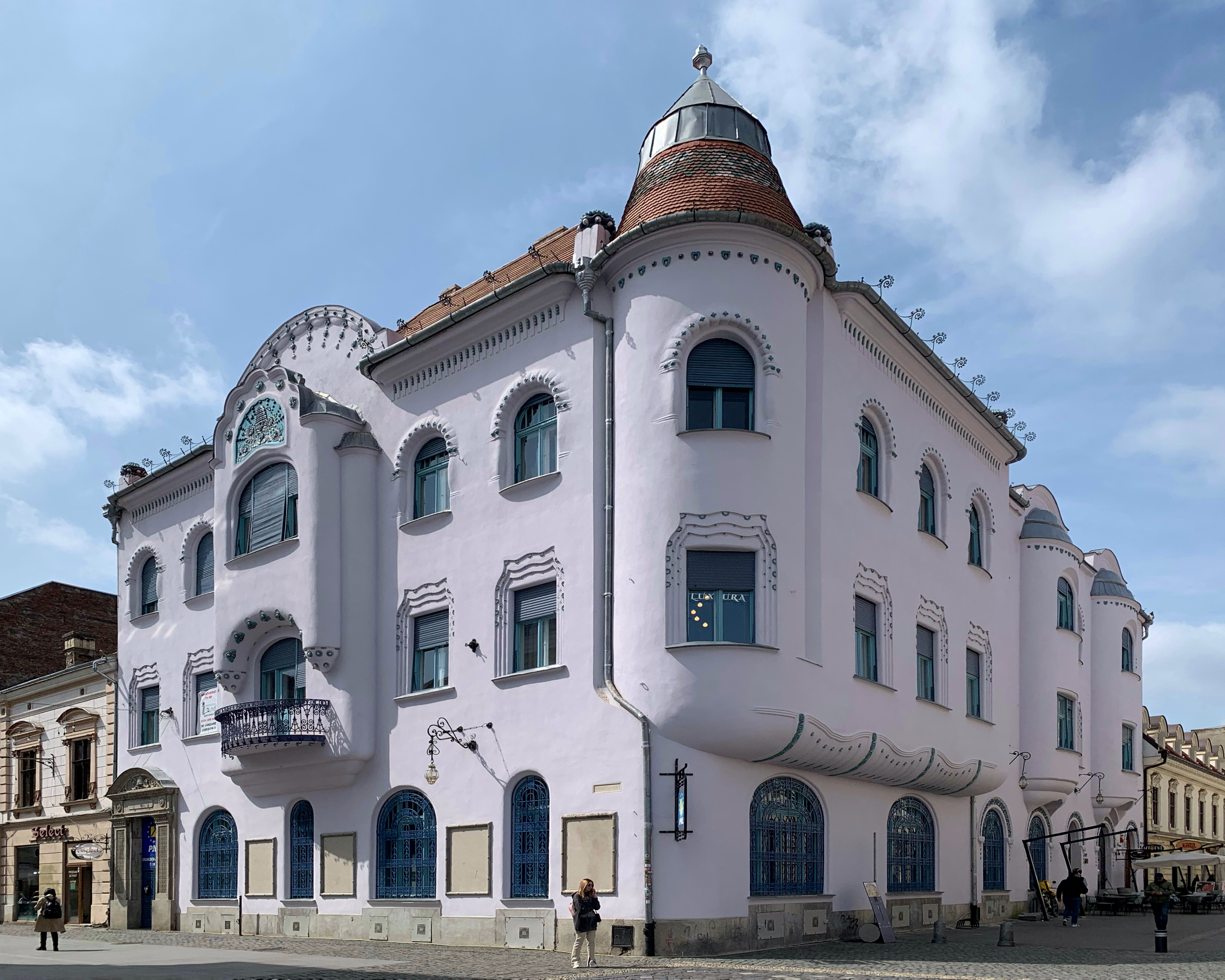
- Steiner Palace in 2023
- Interactive map of the Steiner Palace area
- Former names: Discount Bank
- Alternative names: Gingerbread House

General information
- Architectural style: Secession
- Location: 1 Gheorghe Lazăr Street, Timișoara
- Coordinates: 45°45′26″N 21°13′39″E
- Completed: 13 August 1909

Design and construction
- Architects: Marcell Komor; Dezső Jakab

Steiner Palace (Romanian: Palatul Steiner) is a historical building in Timișoara, Romania, located in the southwest corner of Union Square. One of the most representative buildings of the local szecesszió movement, it housed the South Hungarian Discount Bank during the pre-war period.

== History ==
The palace is named after its benefactor, the spodium producer Miksa (Max) Steiner. It was designed by Jewish architects Marcell Komor and Dezső Jakab, disciples of Ödön Lechner. Komor and Jakab have also collaborated on the construction of other buildings in modern-day Romania in Salonta, Târgu Mureș, Oradea or Deva. Until 1908, on the current site of the palace, there was a low building with a very massive ground floor elevation, probably an 18th-century construction, where the owners were merchants, lawyers, officers, a pharmacist, and a military pharmacy. Completed in the summer of 1909, the structure was intended as a rental property. Its owner, Miksa (Max) Steiner, also owned another impressive building in the Fabric district, which was also leased out.

The Steiner Palace housed the South Hungarian Discount Bank (Hungarian: Délmagyarországi Leszámítolóbank; German: Südungarische Escomte Bank), a banking institution founded in 1906, during the pre-war period.

After the 1989 revolution, the building began to deteriorate. The first rehabilitation project was done in 2012–2013, and the actual works began in 2019. Carried out with the tenants' funds, the rehabilitation proved complicated due to the building's curved shapes in contrast to the rigid forms of baroque and neoclassicism that dominate Union Square.

== Architecture ==
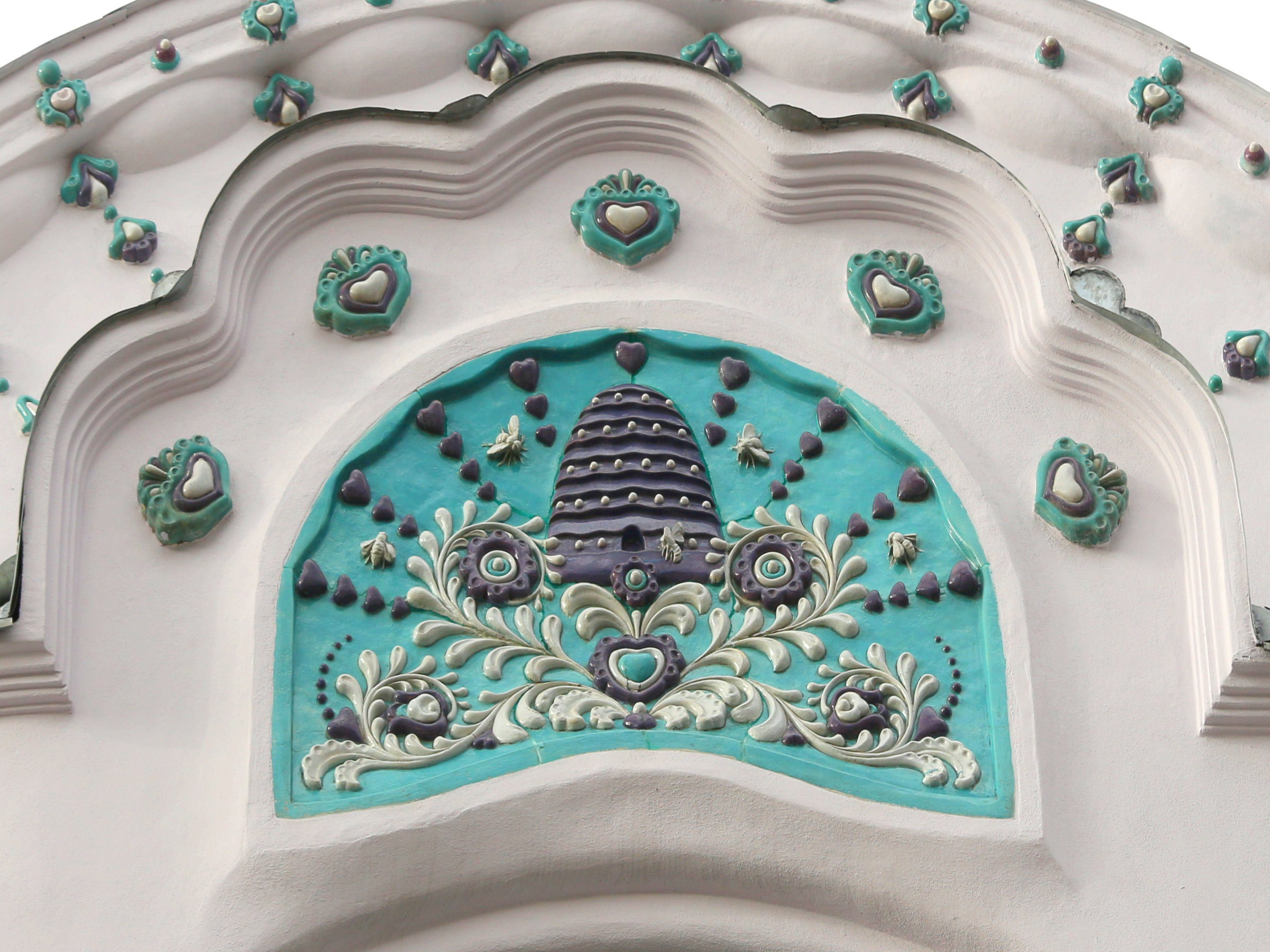
The motif of the beehive

The roof's dynamic shapes, the Zsolnay glazed ceramic decorations, and the national decorative motifs encase the building within the Hungarian szecesszió style. The building has two floors and faces two streets. The facade on Vasile Alecsandri Street is shorter but more ornate, while the one on Gheorghe Lazăr Street is longer and more sober. While the ground floor is designed with simplicity and straight lines, the upper floors feature projections shaped from curved forms that break out from the building's monolithic structure along the entire facade. The short facade is symmetrical, with a prominent central projection extending across both floors, which also supports the balcony, complemented on the upper floor by a second, richly adorned projection. On the longer side, three similar but less decorative projections are placed asymmetrically. The wide projection at the corner creates the illusion of the building's greater length and, with its vertical design, gives a sense of upward movement, an effect enhanced by the pointed roof.

The building's decoration incorporates various symbols, such as beehives shaped like flowers or hearts, representing diligence and prosperity, which also reference the bank's headquarters on the ground floor. With its dynamic forms and curving elements on the facade, the Steiner Palace appears to be a forerunner to the works of Antoni Gaudí. Also noteworthy is the chameleon-like color of the facades, which changes its hue depending on the intensity of the light, being white, blue or lilac.

The building's architectural design was frequently lauded by contemporary press, which offered reviews like "the most elegant building in the city," "a gem of elegance in Timișoara," and similar praise.
