= Géza Márkus =

Hungarian architect

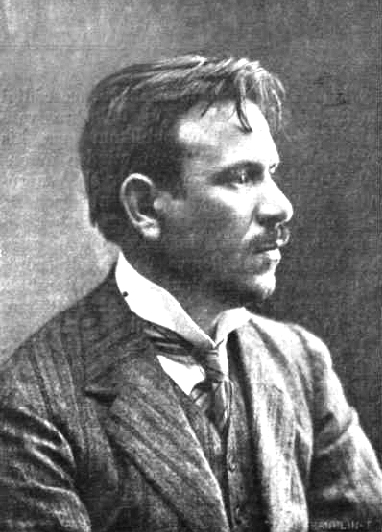

Géza Márkus (Pest, 4 August 1871 – Budapest, 6 December 1912) was a Hungarian Jewish architect.

== Life ==
He was the brother-in-law of conductor Dezső Márkus and newspaper writer Miksa Márkus. His first works show the influence of the modern Viennese Art Nouveau, later Ödön Lechner (the apartment building of the city of Kecskemét, the Erdey Sanatorium in Bakács Square). With Frigyes Spiegel, he won the 1st prize in the competition of the Szeged Music Palace. His last work is the Budapest Folk Opera, which he designed together with architects Marcell Komor and Dezső Jakab. He was one of the pioneers of modern Hungarian theater construction and set design. He designed the architectural parts of the Vörösmarty memorial. He has been an art critic for a long time for Magyar Hírlap and other newspapers.
