= Subotica City Hall =

Building in Subotica, Serbia

- Градска кућа у Суботици; Gradska kuća u Subotici; Szabadkai Városháza
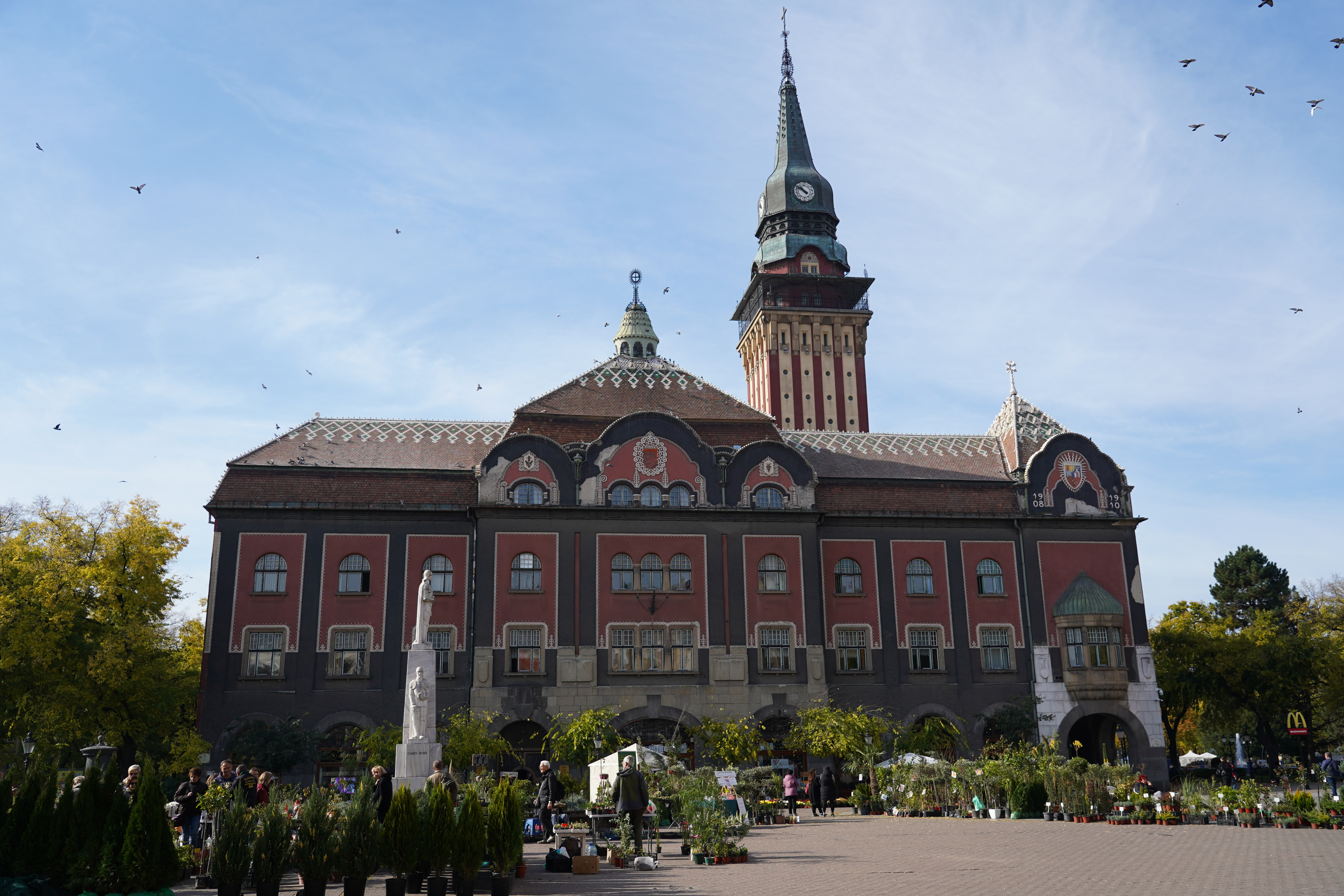
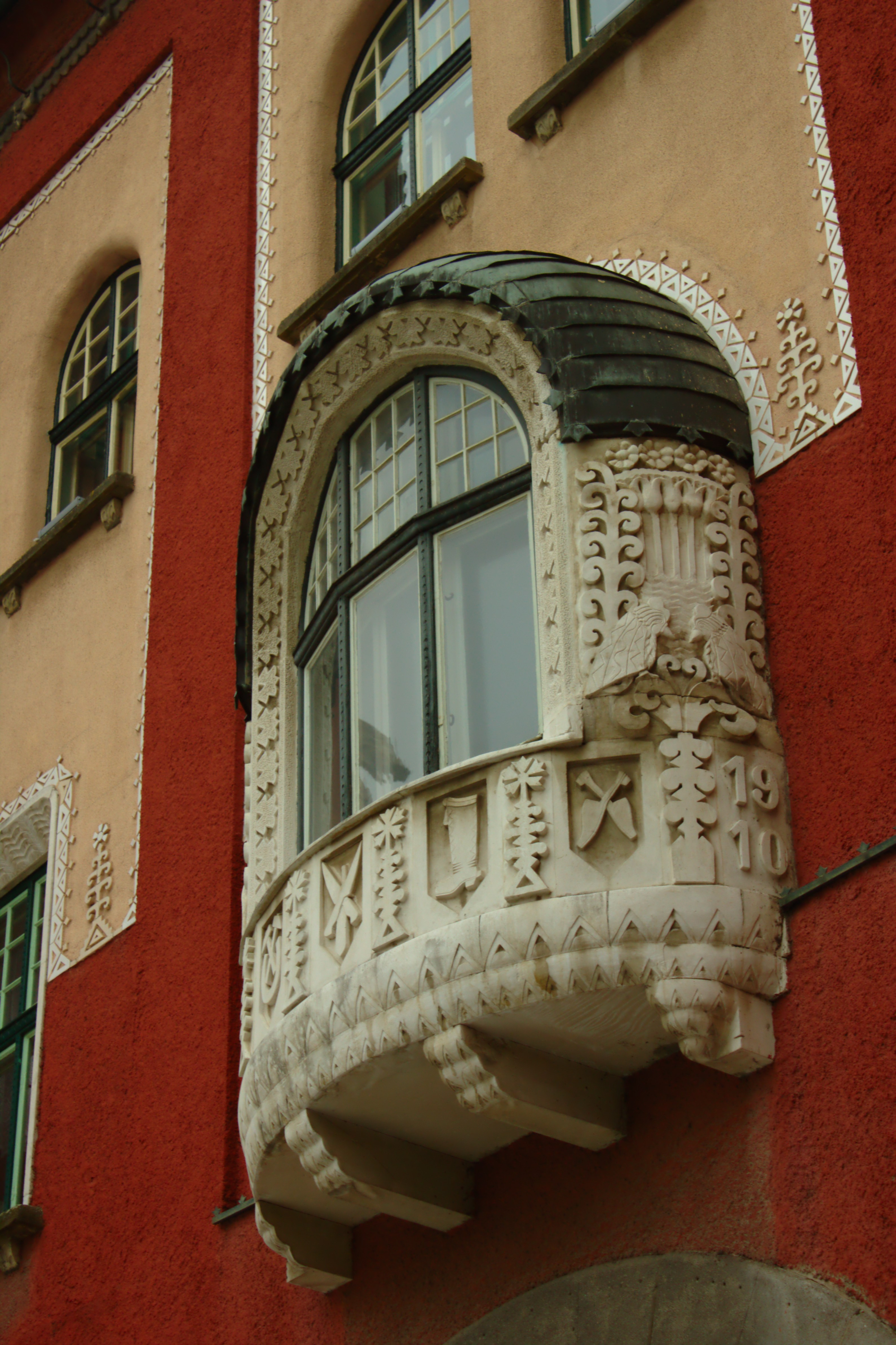
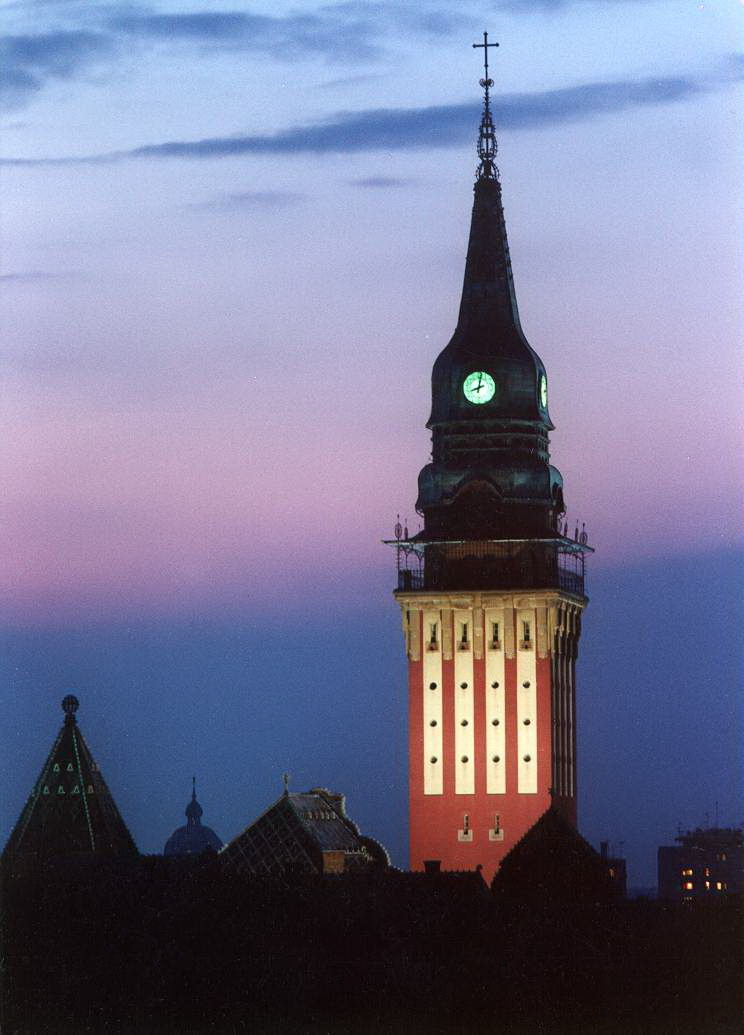
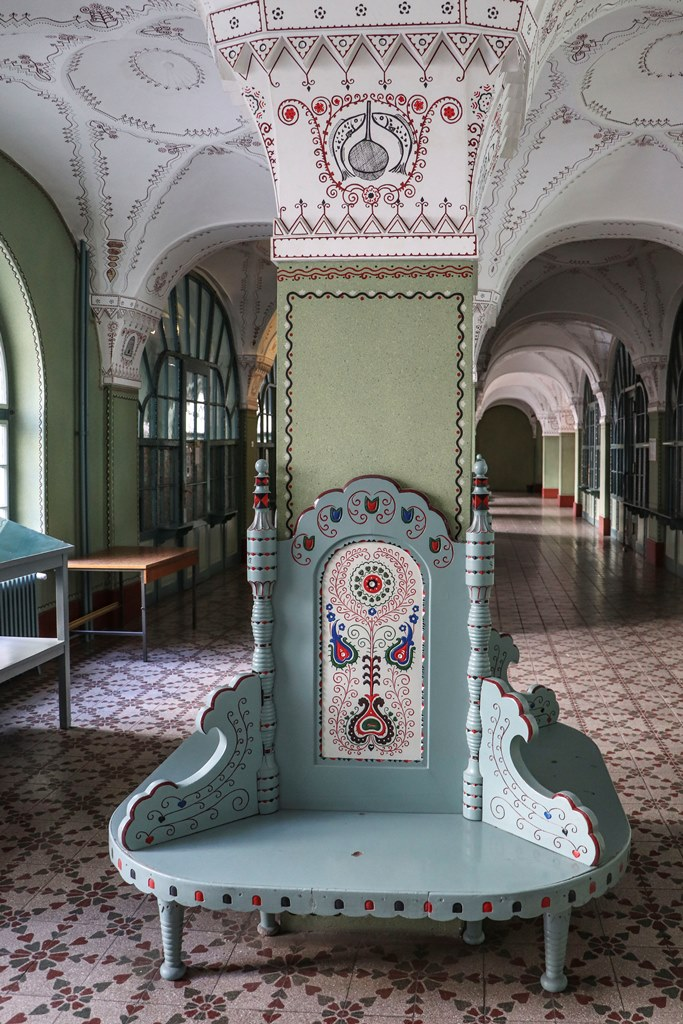
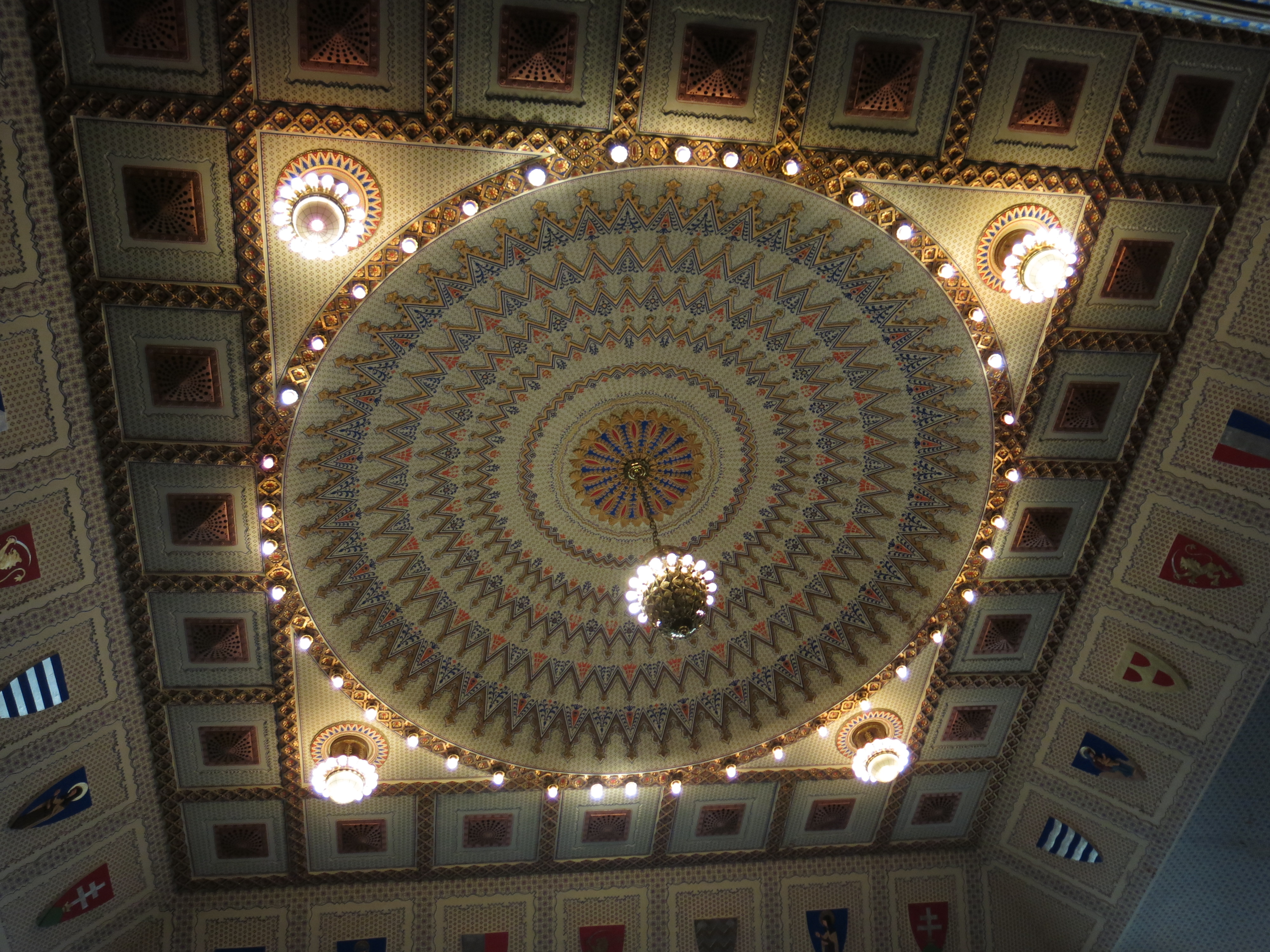
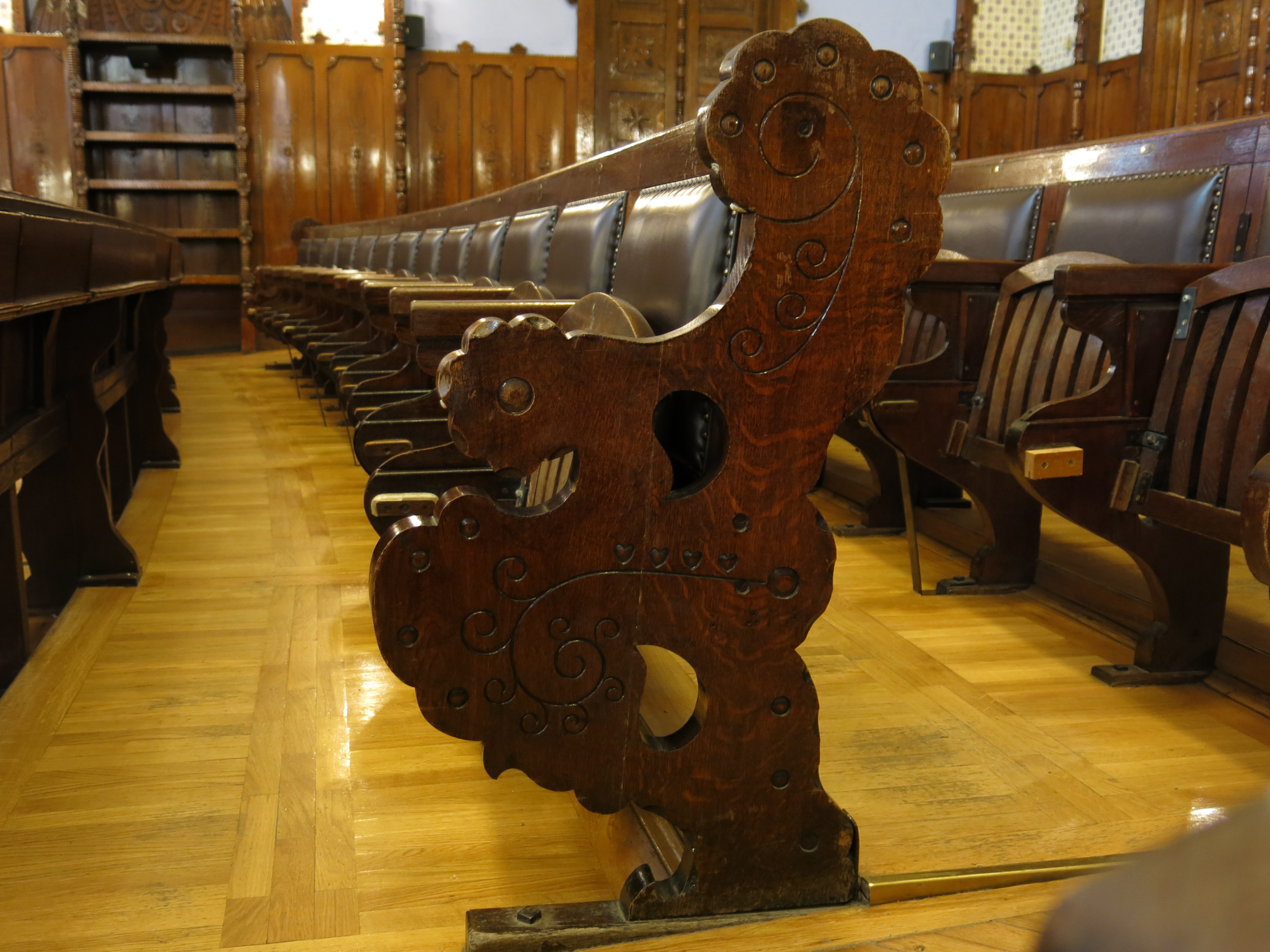
- Subotica City Hall

General information
- Architectural style: Hungarian Secession (Art Nouveau)
- Location: Trg slobode, Subotica, Serbia
- Coordinates: 46°05′59″N 19°39′52″E
- Construction started: 1908; 118 years ago
- Completed: 1912; 114 years ago

Technical details
- Size

Cultural Heritage of Serbia
- Type: Immovable Cultural Heritage of Exceptional Importance
- Designated: 22 December 1993
- Reference no.: SK 1036

Design and construction
- Architects: Marcell Komor and Dezső Jakab

The Subotica City Hall (Serbian: Градска кућа у Суботици, Gradska kuća u Subotici, Hungarian: Szabadkai Városháza) is the administrative seat of the city of Subotica in the province of Vojvodina in northern Serbia. The building is one of city's most prominent landmarks. Constructed between 1908 and 1912 when Vojvodina was a part of Austro-Hungarian Transleithania, the building was designed by Hungarian architects Marcell Komor and Dezső Jakab in the Hungarian Secession style, a branch of Art Nouveau. Today, it serves both as the center of local government and as a major tourist attraction in northern Serbia.

== History ==
Three successive town hall buildings have stood on the same site, constructed in 1751, 1826–1827 and with the completion of the contemporary building in 1912.

Plans for a new town hall in Subotica were initiated in 1906, when the city senate announced a public tender for its construction. The existing Baroque-style town hall from the early 19th century had fallen into disrepair, prompting mayor Károly Biro to advocate for a modern replacement. The winning design was submitted by Budapest architects Marcell Komor and Dezső Jakab, who worked in the Hungarian Secession style. Construction took place between 1908 and 1910, with interior works completed in 1912.

== Cultural Heritage Designation ==
The Subotica City Hall was built between 1908 and 1912 and has been recognized as a cultural monument since the mid-20th century. It was first placed under protection by a decision of the Provincial Institute for the Protection of Cultural Monuments in Novi Sad in 1967. Additional protective rulings were issued by the Intermunicipal Institute for the Protection of Cultural Monuments in Subotica in 1985 and 1986. In 1990, the building was officially classified as a Cultural Property of Exceptional Importance by the Republic of Serbia. It was entered into the Central Register of cultural monuments under number SK 1036 on 22 December 1993.

== See also ==
- Novi Sad City Hall
- Bács-Bodrog County Palace
- Zrenjanin City Hall
- Raichle's Palace
- Subotica Synagogue
- Historical Archives of Subotica
