= Erkel Theatre =

Theatre in Budapest, Hungary

Coordinates: 47°29′49″N 19°4′36″E

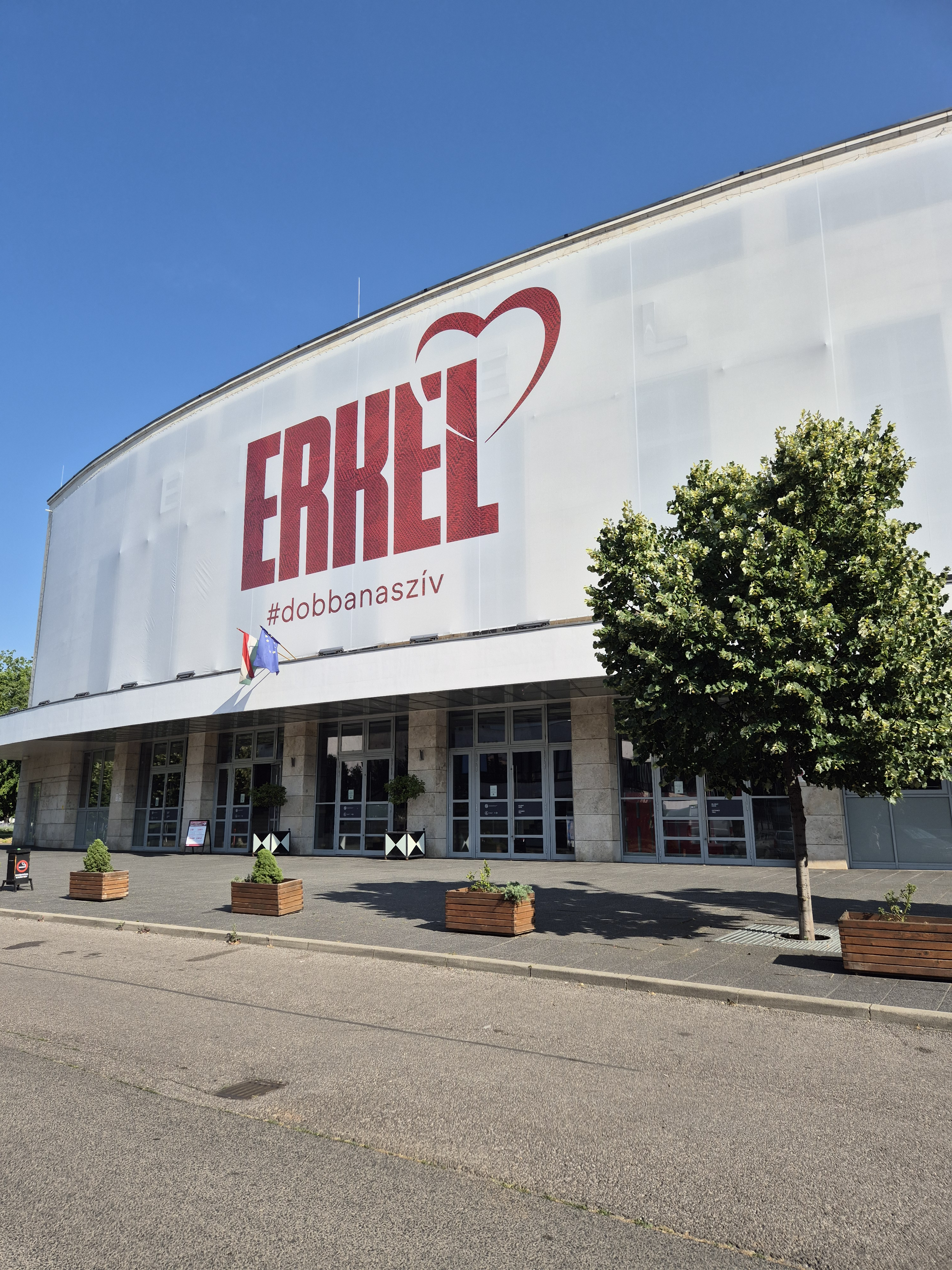
The Erkel Theatre

Auditorium of Erkel Theatre

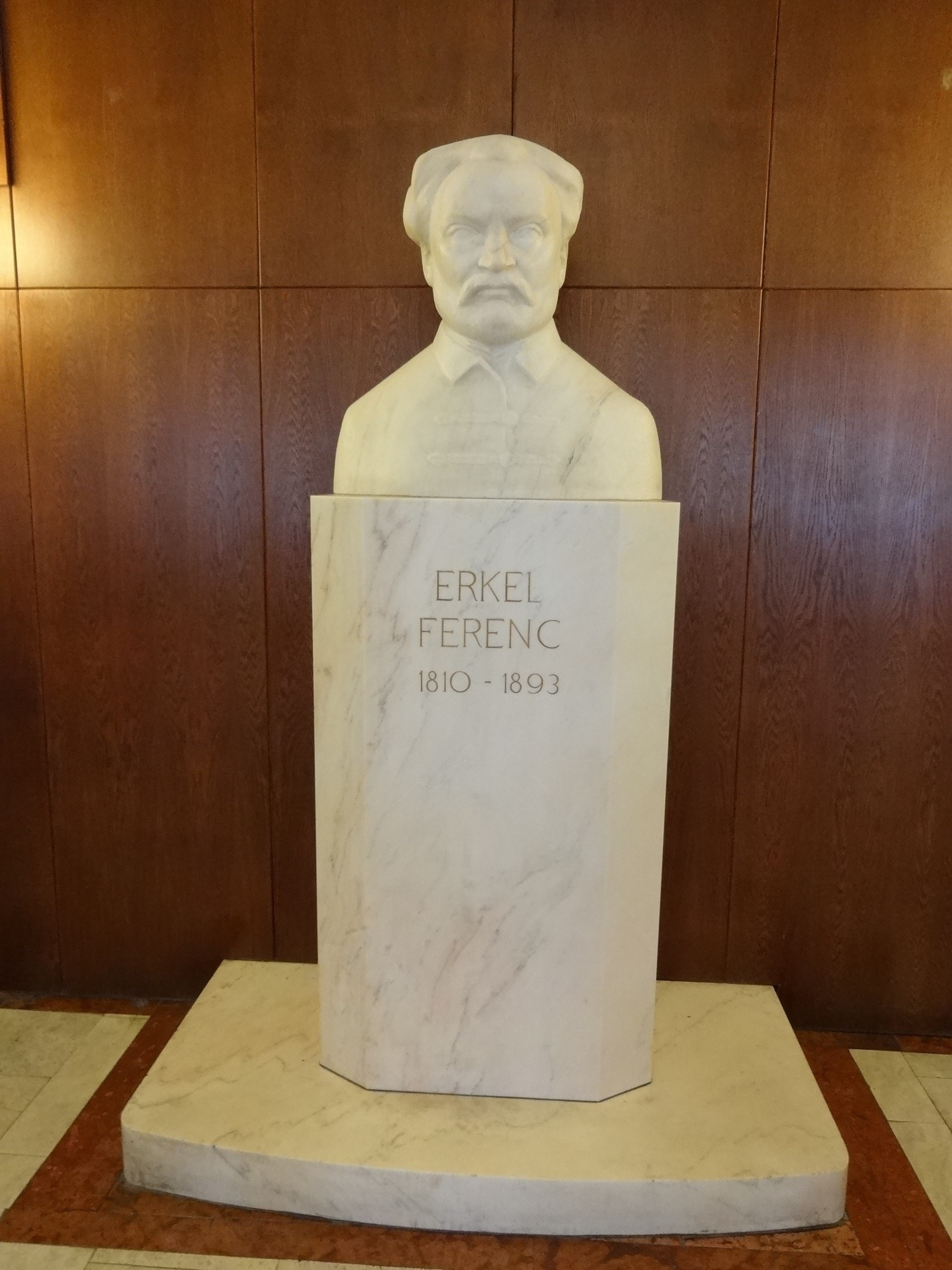
Bust of Hungarian composer Ferenc Erkel, foyer of the Erkel Theatre, Budapest.

The Erkel Theatre is a theatre in Budapest, Hungary. The largest theatre in the city with 1819 seats, it functioned as a secondary venue to the Hungarian State Opera House from 1951 until 2024. Since september 2025, it operates as a standalone musical theatre under the leadership of Vajk Szente, with a mission statement to become the #1 home of musicals in the country. It operates on a repertory system.

== History ==
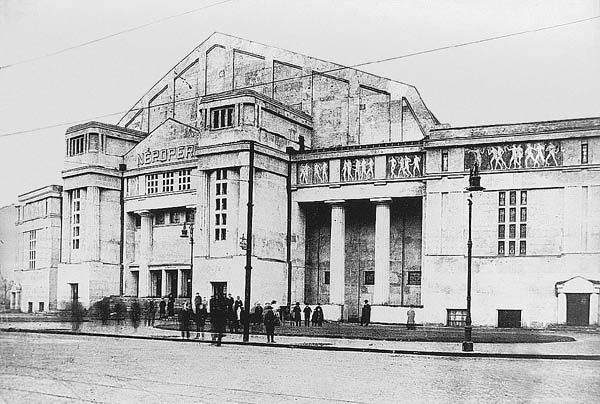
The building after its opening in 1911

With the idea of bringing opera to the masses for cheap, originally named Népopera (The People's Opera), the theatre was planned and built by the Népopera JSC (funded largely by the Budapest city council). The council provided the plot for free, but in return it regulated the theatre's operation: among other requirements, it had to employ a permanent Hungarian company, and the language of the plays had to be Hungarian.

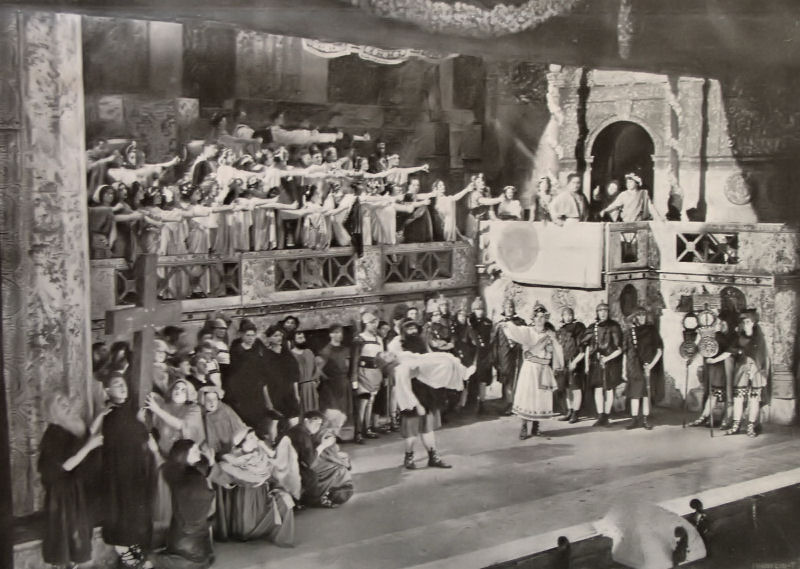
The final moments of the premiere in 1911

Designed by Dezső Jakab, Marcell Komor and Géza Márkus, the theatre was completed in 9 months. Equipped with modern machinery, including an organ, it had a 14-meter-wide (46 ft) and 8.5-meter-tall (28 ft) stage. The auditorium was similarly large, with a size of 40×10 meters. Intended for the working masses, the theatre was simplistic in style, except for a large mural made by Bertalan Pór. The inauguration took place on 7 December 1911.

While it was home to a number of critically acclaimed and successful shows, including a season featuring the complete works of Richard Wagner, after a few years, the idea of an Opera house for the working class proved to be impossible to realize. After the start of World War I, The People's Opera was shut down in 1915. In 1917 Gábor Faludi modernized the building, reduced the number of seats to 2400, and changed the name to Városi Színház (City Theatre). For the next three decades, the theatre became home to a number of tenants and theatre companies, and with them, to a number of various genres and styles.

Between 1940 and 1945 the theatre was managed directly by the city council as an art center, showing guest plays by the Opera House and the National Theatre, along with various literary events and concerts. From 1946, the building operated as a cinema for two years.

From 1948 it returned to its original function, and in 1951 the building was brought under the supervision of the State Opera House, and operated as its secondary stage until its 2007 closure. The theatre was renamed to Erkel Theatre in 1953 after the composer Ferenc Erkel. Significant renovations took place between 1959 and 1961.

The theatre was closed between June 2007 and March 2013, when it reopened after renovations. It served as a secondary scene for the Hungarian State Opera until 2025.

After a state-founded nonprofit was made in November 2024 to acquire the construction for HUF 2 billion, the Erkel Theatre rebranded as a standalone musical theatre independent from the State Opera starting with the 2025/2026 season. With its first show 'Hello, Erkel!' being a welcome for the expected new young audiences, the first season's show repertory was presented to a sold-out auditorium. The new theatre's director is Vajk Szente, its art director is Péter Cseke.

== Production history ==
=== 2025/2026 Season ===
- Levente Juhász - Vajk Szente - Attila Galambos: The Throne (Hungarian: A trón, dir.: Vajk Szente, premiered on September 19, 2025)
- Szilveszter Lévay - Michael Kunze: Elisabeth (Hungarian: Elisabeth, dir.: Vajk Szente, premiered on October 3, 2025)
- Alan Menken - Glenn Slater - Cheri & Bill Steinkellner: Sister Act (Hungarian: Apáca show, dir.: Vajk Szente, premiered on November 14, 2025)
- Viktor Rakonczai - Tamás Orbán - András Vinnai - Bálint Hegedűs: Dream Traveller (Hungarian: Álomutazó, dir.: Tamás Juronics, premiered on December 19, 2025)
- Ferenc Demjén - Krisztina Goda - Anett Kormos: How Could I Live Without You? (Hungarian: Hogyan tudnék élni nélküled?, dir.: Vajk Szente, premiered on February 13, 2026)
- Szilveszter Lévay - Michael Kunze: Rebecca (Hungarian: Rebecca, dir.: Attila Béres, premiered on April 2, 2026)

=== Summer 2026 ===
- Katalin Vajda: Lovers in Ancona (touring production; Hungarian: Anconai szerelmesek, dir.: Péter Cseke, premiere expected on June 13, 2026 in Gödöllő)

=== 2026/2027 Season ===
- Stephen Schwartz - Winnie Holzman: Wicked (Hungarian: Wicked, dir.: Vajk Szente, upcoming premiere)
- Rob Bolland - Ferdi Bolland - André Breedland: The Three Musketeers (Hungarian: A 3 testőr, dir.: Vajk Szente, upcoming premiere)
- Juli Svraka-Gévai - Márk Ember: Tenants' Meeting (Hungarian: Lakógyűlés, dir.: Márk Ember, premiere expected on October 14)*

* Erkel360 productions (arena theatre productions with the audience seated on stage, performed on the ensemble team's and chorus line's days off

== Sources ==
- - The Erkel Theatre in the Hungarian Theatrical Lexicon (György, Székely. Magyar Színházművészeti Lexikon. Budapest: Akadémiai Kiadó, 1994. ISBN 978-963-05-6635-3), freely available on mek.oszk.hu (in Hungarian)
- The People's Theatre (Study) (in Hungarian)
