= Marcell Komor =

Hungarian architect (1868–1944)

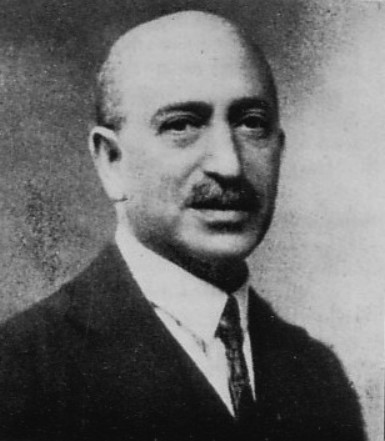
- Marcell Komor, circa 1901–02
- Born: November 7, 1868; Pest, Hungary
- Died: November 29, 1944 (aged 76); Sopron, Hungary
- Education: Királyi József Műegyetem (Royal Joseph University of Technology; now the Budapest University of Technology and Economics)
- Occupation: Architect
- Buildings: Subotica City Hall; Subotica Synagogue; Targu Mures Town Hall; Black Eagle Hotel

Marcell Komor (né Kohn; in Hungarian: Komor Marcell) (Pest, Hungary, 7 November 1868 – 29 November 1944, Sopron, Hungary), was a Hungarian architect. He was one of the most important architects in Hungary from the end of the nineteenth century to the 1930s, particularly known for his work as a major exponent of the Szecesszió style, the Hungarian strand of Art Nouveau, at the turn of the twentieth century. He is regarded as one of the major founding figures of Hungarian modern architecture, in particular for his work in tandem with longtime partner Dezső Jakab.

== Early life ==
Komor was Jewish. His father was the rabbi Salamon Kohn, and his mother named Lujza Eibuschitz (née Eibenschütz). He was the last of seven biological children, with older siblings Izidor, Siegfrid, Arnold, Gyula, Kamilla, and Regina. His parents also raised and adopted another son as their eighth child, Pál Újlaki, who later became the Batavian physician to Queen Wilhelmina of the Netherlands (who led the Dutch during World War II and became eventually the world's richest woman and first female billionaire). It was Marcell, however, who became the most famous member of the family. His grandson, Tamás Székely (1925–2025), was an engineer and composer of the MÁV signal.

== Career ==
Komor matriculated at the Királyi József Műegyetem (Royal Joseph University of Technology; now the Budapest University of Technology and Economics), graduating in 1891. He then worked in the architectural offices of two of his professors there, Alajos Hauszmann and Győző Czigler, and then moved to the office of the great Ödön Lechner, who with his then-partner Gyula Partos, was just beginning to develop his signature Szecessió aesthetic based on central Asian arts and crafts traditions in the design of the new national Iparművészeti Múzeum in Budapest (1893–96), one of the first museums in the world dedicated specifically to the decorative and applied arts. In Lechner's office Komor was responsible for much of the interior design of another major commission, the Hungarian Institute of Geology and Geophysics (1897–99).

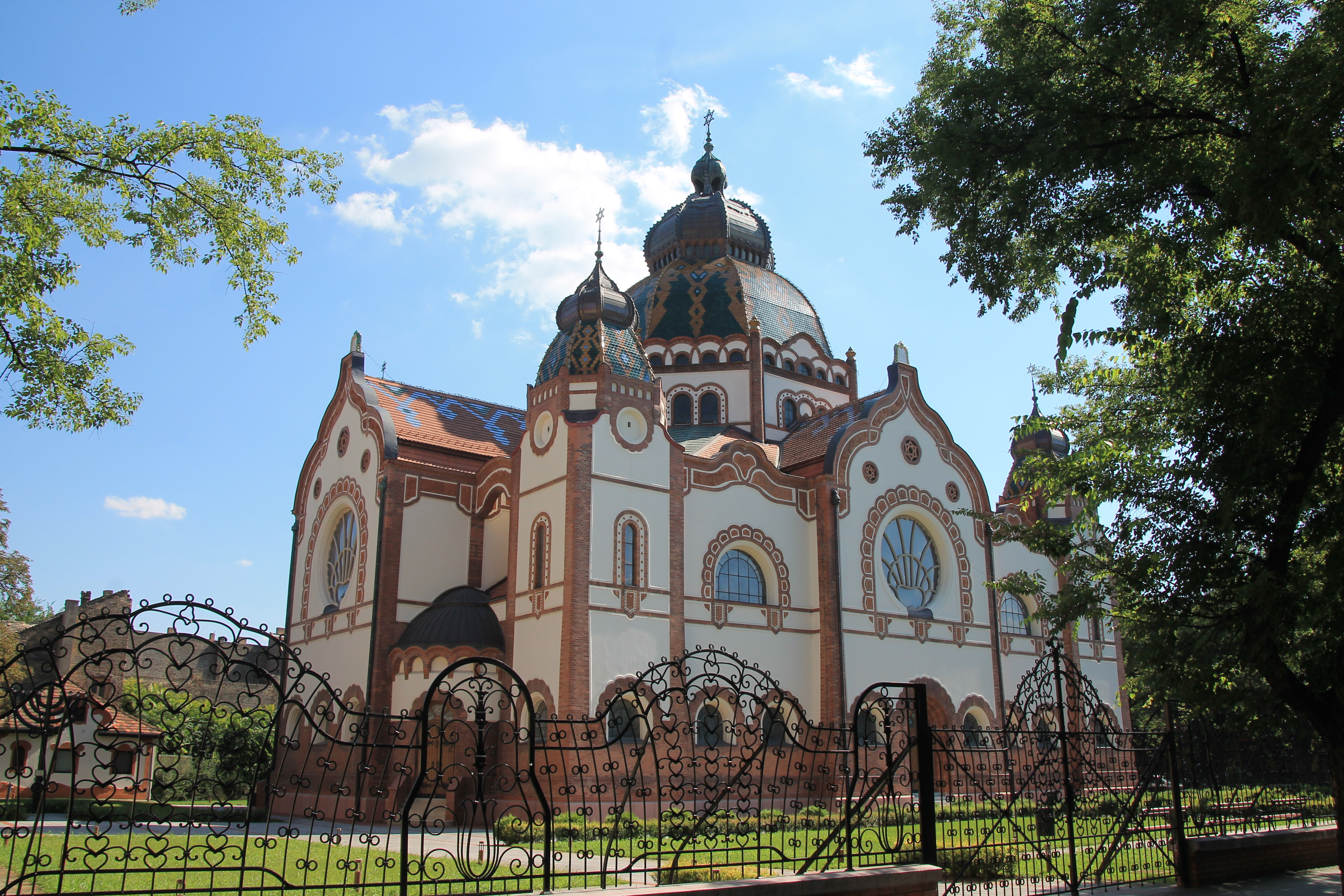
The Synagogue in Szabadka, Hungary, (now Subotica, Serbia; 1900–03) is one of two major works of Komor and his partner Dezső Jakab in the city.

In 1897, Komor formed an independent firm with Dezső Jakab, which they maintained until 1923, a highly successful partnership that would bring both of them international renown and develop a distinctive architectural aesthetic using the language of Szecesszió. The two won several architectural competitions for major commissions, most of which were ultimately built. Komor was the lead designer, responsible for the conception of the overall building, organization of space, and construction; while Jakab handled the interior design and minute details. They were quite prolific and versatile, designing residential buildings, both villas and collective housing; commercial structures; public buildings; houses of worship; mausoleums; exhibition pavilions; monuments; and institutional structures, throughout what was then Hungary, Austria, and Bulgaria, but now with readjusted national borders includes also locations in Serbia, Romania, and Slovakia.

Komor and Jakab's best-known works include the town halls of Subotica, Serbia (then Szabadka, Hungary; 1908–10) and Târgu Mureș, Romania (then Marosvásárhely, Hungary; 1905–07), the latter of which was complemented shortly after by the neighboring Târgu Mureș Palace of Culture (1911–13). These are very large multi-wing complexes enclosing multiple courtyards, marked by prominent bell towers and a rich array of colorful surfaces, particularly stucco ornamentation and Zsolnay tilework. Much of this ornament is composed of floral and geometric patterns that mimic those on printed or woven textiles. In Subotica, they completed the New Synagogue (1900–02), a design which they recycled from their second-prize entry to the 1899 competition for the neighboring Szeged Synagogue (won and built by Lipót Baumhorn). The multi-domed structure, designed like a tent, features prominent use of Zsolnay ceramics and stained glass with floral decor that also resembles the motifs of peacock feathers. Like its sister in Szeged, the 23-meter-high interior space, with a dome span of 12.6 meters, accommodated a large Jewish community in southern Hungary, seating up to 1600 people, 850 men on the ground floor and 550 women in the gallery, unusually supported by a modern steel structure. It is the only synagogue in Europe built in a Hungarian Szecesszió style. It was designated a national heritage site of great importance in 1974 and was elevated to national heritage site of exceptional importance 1990; in 2018, a complete restoration was finished and it is now open to the public as a UNESCO World Heritage Site.

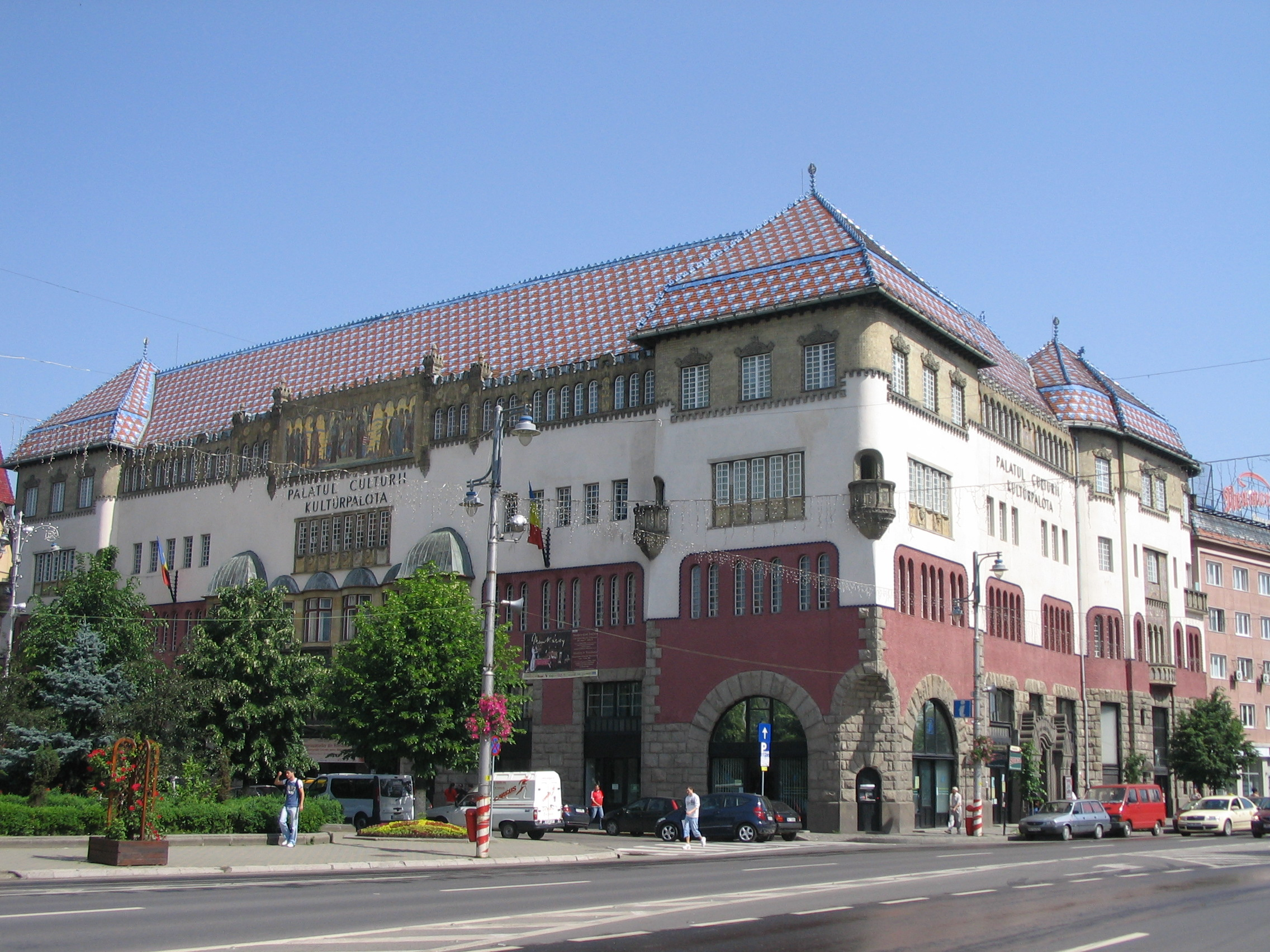
The Palace of Culture in Târgu Mureş (Romania), formerly Marosvásárhely (Hungary), is part of a cluster of Szecesszió-style municipal buildings there built to Komor and Jakab's designs.

Among Komor and Jakab's major commercial buildings are the Black Eagle Hotel in Oradea, Romania (then Nagyvárad, Hungary; 1906–08), which essentially consists of two asymmetrical pavilions, one topped by a prominent turret, joined by a recessed wing; and the Palace Hotel, in Budapest, still a major monument on Rákóczi út. They were commissioned to designed numerous theaters, including ones in Szentes (1897), Bratislava (then called Poszony, 1906), Deva (1910), and Budapest (the original Erkel Theatre, 1911); and banks in Oradea (1906), Timisoara (1908), Subotica (1907), and Szolnok (1908–09). Their numerous private residential commissions included several vacation villas on the shores of Lake Palić, outside of Subotica, along with numerous other supplementary structures, including water tower, grand terrace, women's swimming complex, and memorial fountain. While many of these are marked by their evocations of Hungarian folk architecture, including gabled roofs supported by large eaves and brackets, by the beginning of the First World War Komor and Jakab had begun to experiment with a more severe aesthetic that would parallel much modern architecture in Hungary and elsewhere in the 1920s and '30s. They designed the National Social Security Institute building on Fiumei út in Budapest in 1912–13, but delays in part caused by the war only permitted its completion in 1930, with a tower crowned by a striking floral crown that was demolished in 1967 due to its unstable bauxite concrete content. This shift is confirmed by the modernist villa he and his son János Komor built at 4 Árvácska út, Budapest, in 1931.

Beginning at the start of the new century, Komor also wrote extensively in the periodical Vállalkozók Lapjá (Engineers' Pages), founded in 1879, the definitive journal for architecture and construction in Hungary. He served as editor-in-chief between 1901 and 1914, writing under the pseudonym "Ezrey," referring to the millennium (in 1896 Hungary had just celebrated 1000 years of the monarchy). In his articles he further advocated the nationalistic intellectual principles originally elucidated by Lechner and colleagues such as Károly Kós; namely, that modern Hungarian architecture could only develop by combining national motifs, traditional forms, and modern technologies. At the end of the 1920s, Komor relinquished control of the magazine to his son János. Under a new editor, Virgil Borbíró (or Bierbauer), the publication would soon become the internationally renowned avant-garde organ, Tér és Forma.

== Family Life and Death ==
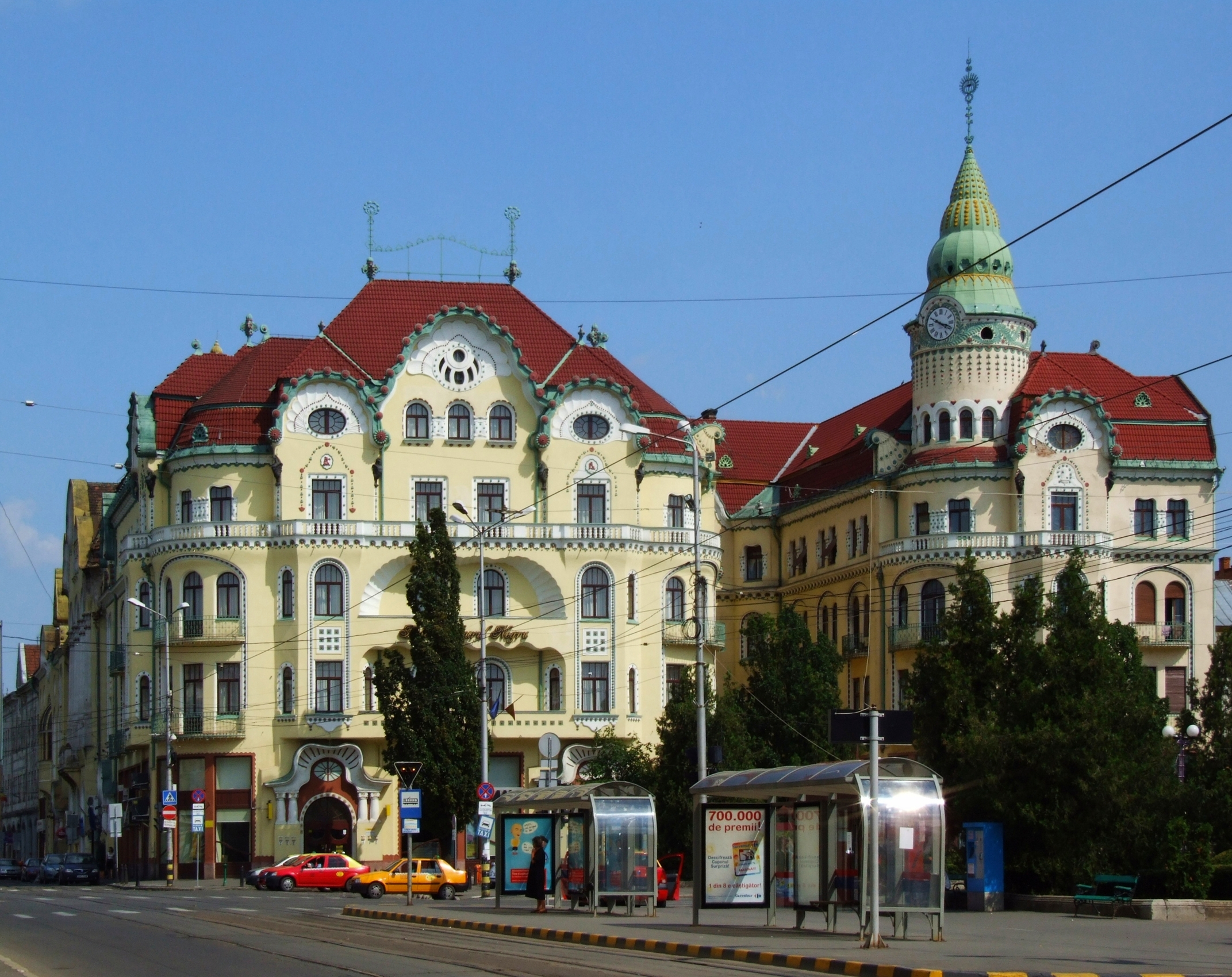
Black Eagle Hotel in Oradea (Romania), probably Komor and Jakab's most outstanding example of hotel design.

Komor and Jakab designed Komor's house in the fashionable second district of Budapest, in the hilly terrain on the west bank (Buda) of the Danube, at 29 Keleti Károly utca, finished in 1909. (Jakab and his family lived at no. 31, next door.) Their office was also located at the same address.

The Komor household was a solidly bourgeois environment. The Komors could afford a servant for 20–30 pengős a month until 1942. Hungarian and German were both frequently spoken, and Komor kept a large library that consisted of volumes of Hungarian and German art, literature and music. The family commonly attended the theater, opera, or another concert twice a week, and music was a major part of the household activities. Marcell and his siblings all had learned an instrument, and chamber music performances were not unusual. They entertained and were entertained by renowned Hungarian musicians such as János Starker, Dezső Ernster, Lívia Rév, and Béla Salamon in the large inner hall, as well as the Hungarian writer Józsi Jenő Tersánszky. Komor also kept an art collection of reasonable size. His grandson Tamás Székely remembered a large 3-by-2-meter canvas, Hercules at the Crossroads, possibly painted by Annibale Carracci, that hung in the villa, which was likely destroyed in early 1944.

As Hungary was allied with Nazi Germany during World War II, the Hungarian Jewry were not immediately rounded up (as in directly-Nazi-controlled territories) and sent to the concentration camps as part of the Holocaust. The Komors were allowed to stay in their house relatively unmolested apparently through 1943, despite the repressive measures increasingly implemented by the Hungarian government as the war continued. At the end of January 1944, however, a bomb fell on their house, destroying the living areas of both the Székely and Komor families on the upper two floors of the villa, including all the furnishings, artwork, and furniture, as well as the walls. The residence was designated a yellow-star house in June 1944, and many other Jews moved in, as prescribed by government decree. In mid-November 1944, Marcell Komor set off on foot to visit his sister Kamilla on Falk Miksa utca, but was picked up by the Arrow Cross Party, who drove him westward, and never returned. He was killed near Soproneresztúr (Deutschkreutz), in what is now Austria; he was 76 years old.

== Legacy ==
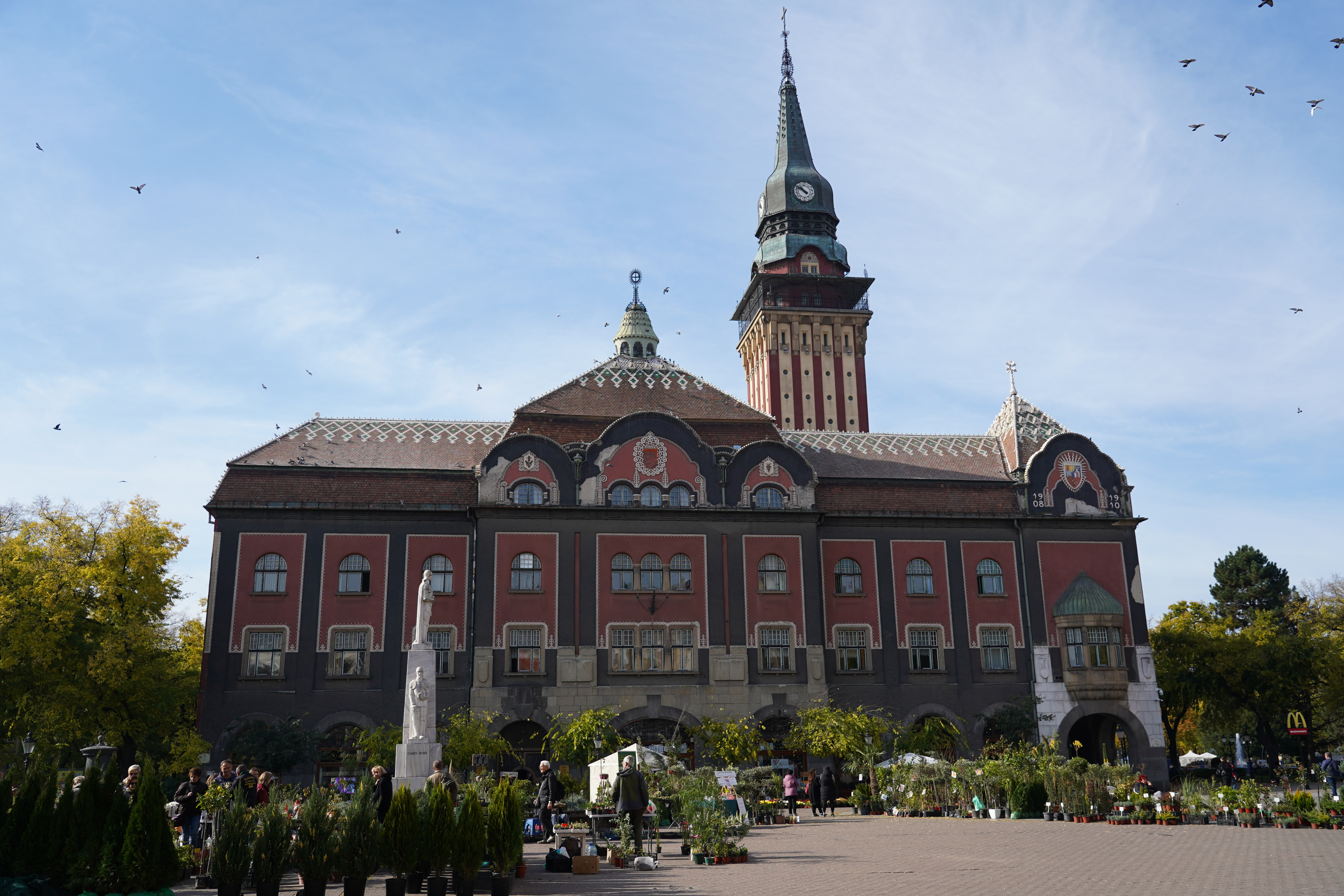
The City Hall of Subotica (1908–10) is one of Komor and Jakab's major works and an outstanding example of Szecesszió architecture.

Art Nouveau (including Hungarian Szecesszió) architecture has seen a renewed interest from scholars and architecture enthusiasts since the 1990s, particularly with the advent of the European Union and the attempts to build a shared continental cultural heritage. Organizations such as the Reseau Art Nouveau Network (RANN) have been founded dedicated to the promotion and preservation of the style in the built environment and decorative arts, and most of the cities where Komor and Jakab's architecture is located have joined such organizations as municipal/institutional members. These developments have also been strengthened by the collapse of the Eastern bloc and the new accessibility of Central and Eastern Europe to tourists and scholars from the rest of Europe and North America. Komor and Jakab's architecture has thus been "rediscovered" (or, perhaps, discovered for the first time) as a key component of the construction of a distinctly Hungarian identity in the built environment in the Austro-Hungarian monarchy at the dawn of the twentieth century. Today much Szecesszió architecture is undergoing or awaiting refurbishment or renovation and being landmarked as key pieces of cultural heritage in many of the countries that made up the Hungarian half of the Habsburg monarchy before 1918, often by international organizations such as UNESCO as a World Heritage Site or the World Monuments Fund.

== Projects and Completed Works ==
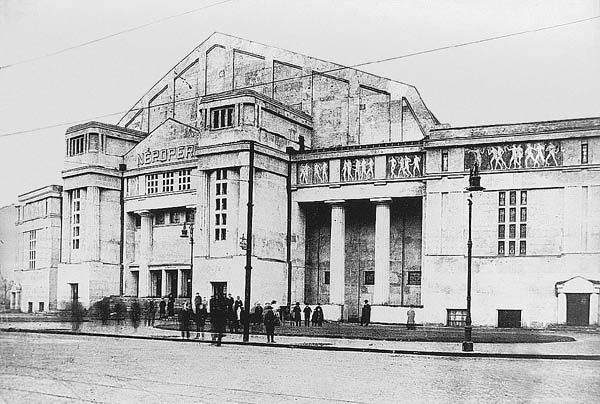
The Folk Opera (Erkel Theater) in Budapest, shortly after Komor and Jakab finished it using designs of Géza Márkus in 1911.

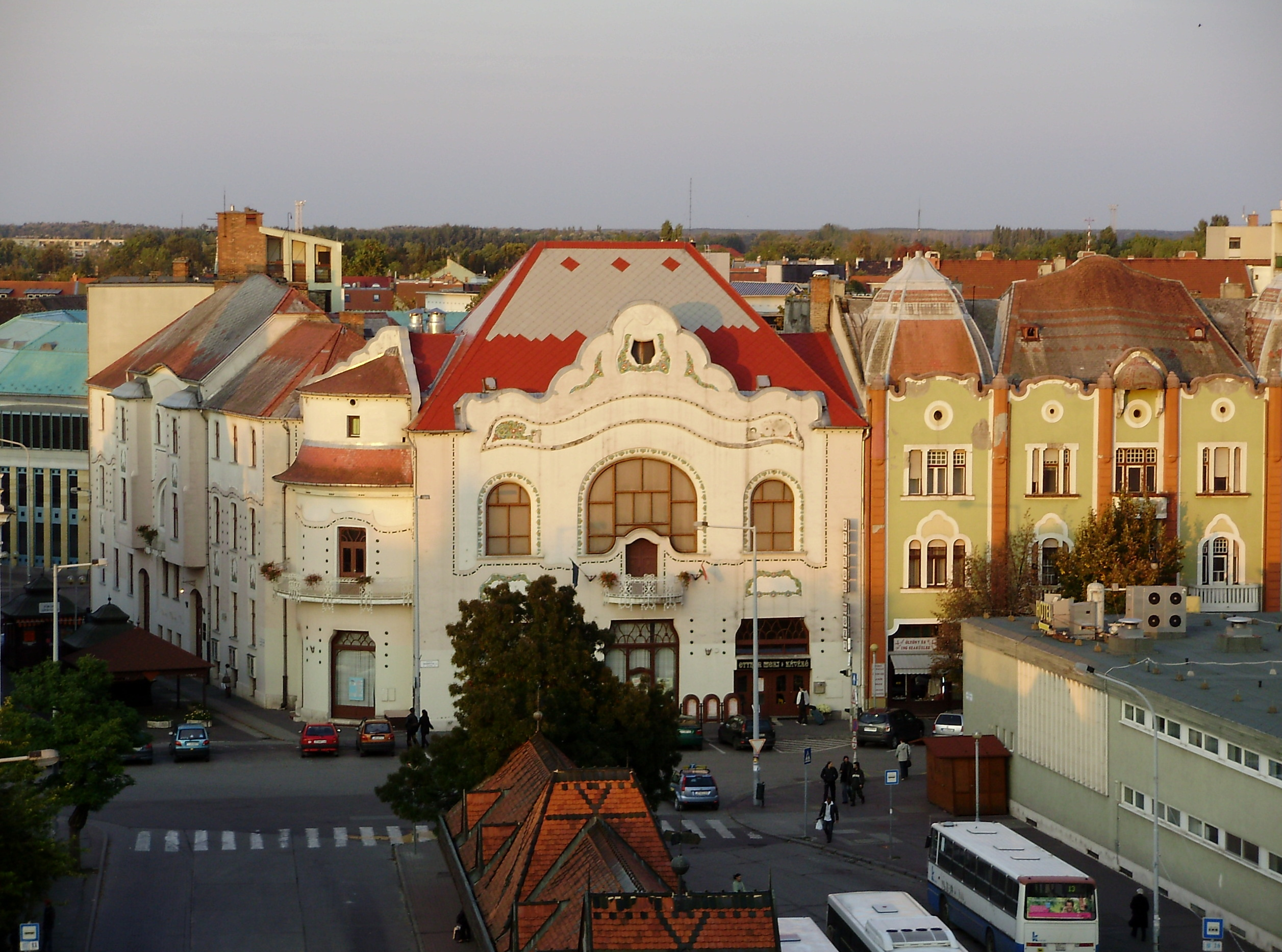
The Kecskemet Youth (Industrial) Home (1904–07) was one of the few buildings of this type designed by Komor or Jakab.

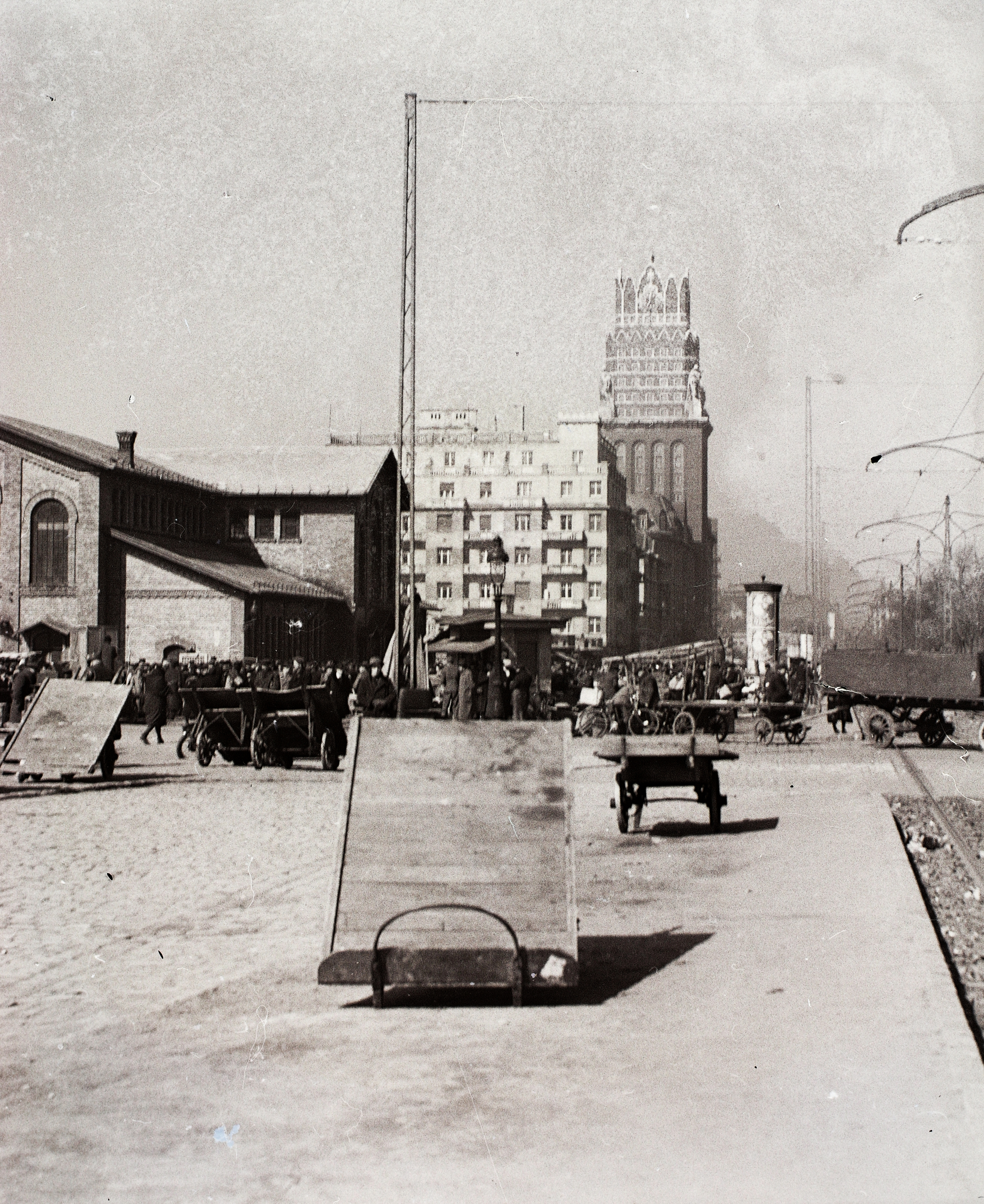
Komor and Jakab and Aladár Sós' Budapest District Workers' Insurance Headquarters on Fiumei út in Budapest (1911–13) was notable for its tower's high crown, removed in 1967 for structural reasons, shown here in a 1940 photograph.

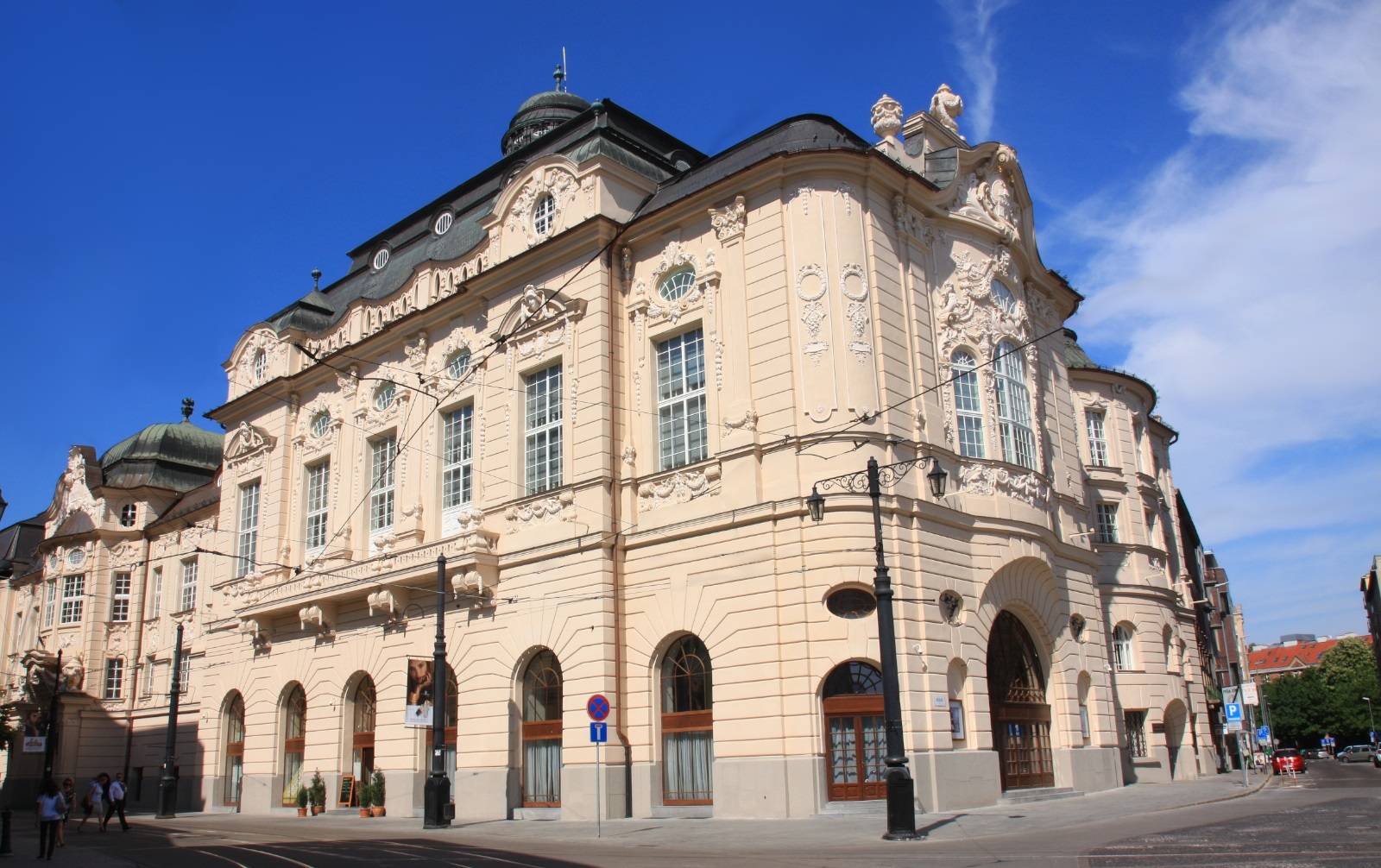
The Reduta concert Hall in Bratislava (Slovakia), then Poszony (Hungary), built 1911–19, was one of the few Baroque-revival buildings by Komor and Jakab.

Note: this is not an exhaustive list.

With Desző Jakab:

- 1890–1900: Szentes. Petőfi Hotel and Theatre. Competition: 1st prize and construction
- 1898–1900: Szolnok. Gorove utca 5 (today Lajos Kossuth utca 5). Szolnok Agricultural Savings Bank headquarters
- 1898: Hungarian Pavilion for the 1900 Exposition Universelle, Paris. Competition: 2nd prize
- 1899: Szeged. Synagogue. Competition entry, unbuilt
- 1899: Budapest. Commodity and Stock Exchange. Competition entry, unbuilt
- 1900: Budapest, VI district, residential building at Csengery utca 76
- 1900–02: Subotica. Synagogue. Competition: 1st prize, and construction
- 1901: Pécs. Main post office. Competition: 3rd prize
- 1902: Bratislava. Chamber of Commerce and Industry. Competition: 1st prize
- 1902: Budapest-Kossuth Mausoleum. Competition entry (with sculptor Márk Vedres)
- 1903: Budapest, XIII. Radnóti Miklós Street 4–6. Residential building (renovation)
- 1904: Kiskunfélegyháza. Central school. Competition: 2nd prize (with Mihály Gesztesi)
- 1905: Budapest. Sáros-fürdő. Competition and commission (with Géza Márkus)dead link
- 1904–07: Kecskemét. Széchenyi Square 7/Kossuth Square 4. Industrial home (now Youth Home). Competition: 1st prize and construction
- 1905: Budapest. Statue of Liberty. Competition entry (with Géza Márkus and sculptor Ede Kallós)
- 1905: Kiskunhalas. Hotel. Competition: Shared 1st prize (with Géza Márkus)
- 1905–06: Oradea. Patriotilor utca 4–6. Adorján Houses
- 1905: Nagyszalonta. Town Hall. Competition: 2nd prize
- 1905: Marcali Synagogue (rebuilt)
- 1905–10: Târgu Mureș. Town Hall. Competition: 1st prize; commission
- 1906: Oradea. Chamber of Commerce and Industry. Competition: 1st prize
- 1906: Oradea. Black Eagle Hotel. Competition: 1st prize; and construction, 1907–1908
- 1906: Oradea. Savings Bank. Competition: 2nd prize.
- 1906: Bratislava. City entertainment and music palace
- 1907–10: Subotica. City Hall (built 1908–1910)
- 1907: Subotica. Commercial Bank Limited
- 1907: Budapest. Workers' Sickness Relief Headquarters. Competition entry and commission
- 1908: Budapest, I. Döbrentei Square residential building (destroyed)
- 1908: Vienna, Austria. Ministry of War. Competition: 3rd prize
- 1908: Timisoara, Romania. Commercial Bank
- 1908–09: Szolnok. Commercial Bank and Savings Bank (destroyed)
- 1908–09: Oradea. Stern Palace
- 1908–09: Budapest, VI. Benczúr utca 47. Liget Sanatorium
- 1909: Palic (Serbia). Vigadó building
- 1909–10: Budapest, VI. Színyei Merse utca 21. Lefèvre House
- 1909–10: Budapest, II. Keleti Károly utca 29–31. Komor and Jakab's own office and residence
- 1909–10: Budapest, VIII. Hegedüs Gyula utca 94. Small apartment building
- 1910: Târgu Mureș (Marosvásárhely). Administrative Palace of Maros-Torda County. Competition: 1st prize, and commission
- 1910: Deva, theater
- 1910: Budapest, VIII. Rákóczi út 43. Palace Hotel
- 1910: Budapest District Workers' Insurance Fund. Design competition: 1st prize, and commission
- 1911: Budapest Bank Rt. Palace. Design competition entry and commission
- 1911: Budapest, VII. Dózsa György út 84. Park sanatorium (demolished)
- 1911: The former People's Opera (now the Erkel Theatre; using the designs of Géza Márkus)
- 1911–13: Târgu Mureș (Marosvásárhely). Cultural Palace
- 1911–13: Budapest, VIII. Fiumei út 19: Budapest District Workers' Insurance Headquarters (with Aladár Sós; tower demolished in 1967)
- 1911–19: Bratislava. Reduta Concert Hall
- 1912: Budapest. Buda Synagogue
- 1912–14: Murány. Palace of Tsar Ferdinand I of Bulgaria. Competition: 1st prize, and commission
- 1913: Budapest National Theatre

With János Komor:

- 1931: Budapest, II. Árvácska utca 4 (formerly the Rézmál Estate), residential building

Independent works:

- 1934: Budapest, IX. Ferenc út 7, interior renovations
- 1935–36: Budapest, II. Kacsa utca 12, Apartment building for József Hoffer
