= Dezső Jakab =

Hungarian architect (1864–1932)

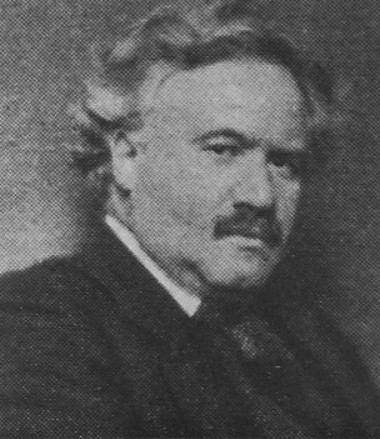
- Dezső Jakab, circa 1900
- Born: November 4, 1864; Biharrév, Hungary (today Rév, Romania)
- Died: August 5, 1932 (aged 67); Budapest, Hungary
- Education: Királyi József Műegyetem (Royal Joseph University of Technology; now the Budapest University of Technology and Economics)
- Occupation: Architect
- Buildings: Subotica City Hall; Subotica Synagogue; Targu Mures Town Hall; Black Eagle Hotel

Dezső Jakab (4 November 1864 – 5 August 1932) was a Hungarian architect of Jewish heritage. He was one of the most important architects in Hungary from the end of the nineteenth century to the 1920s, particularly known for his work as a major exponent of the Szecesszió style, the Hungarian strand of Art Nouveau, at the turn of the twentieth century. He is regarded as one of the major founding figures of Hungarian modern architecture, in particular for his work in tandem with longtime partner Marcell Komor.

== Career ==
He was born in Biharrév, Hungary (now Rév, Romania) to Ármin Jakab and Terézia Held. He graduated from the Királyi József Műegyetem (Royal Joseph University of Technology; now the Budapest University of Technology and Economics) in 1893. He then undertook study trips to Germany, Italy, France, England, the Netherlands, and Belgium. As a young architect, he gained practical experience in several architectural firms. He worked for Imre Francsek Sr., with Marcell Komor, who, despite being four years younger, had graduated two years before him. Later, Jakab worked in the offices of Korb and Pecz. He also worked for the great Ödön Lechner for a short time in the 1890s. In 1896, he transferred to the exhibition design department of the Ministry of Agriculture, where he designed several buildings for the 1896 Millennium Exhibition, celebrating 1000 years of the Hungarian monarchy.

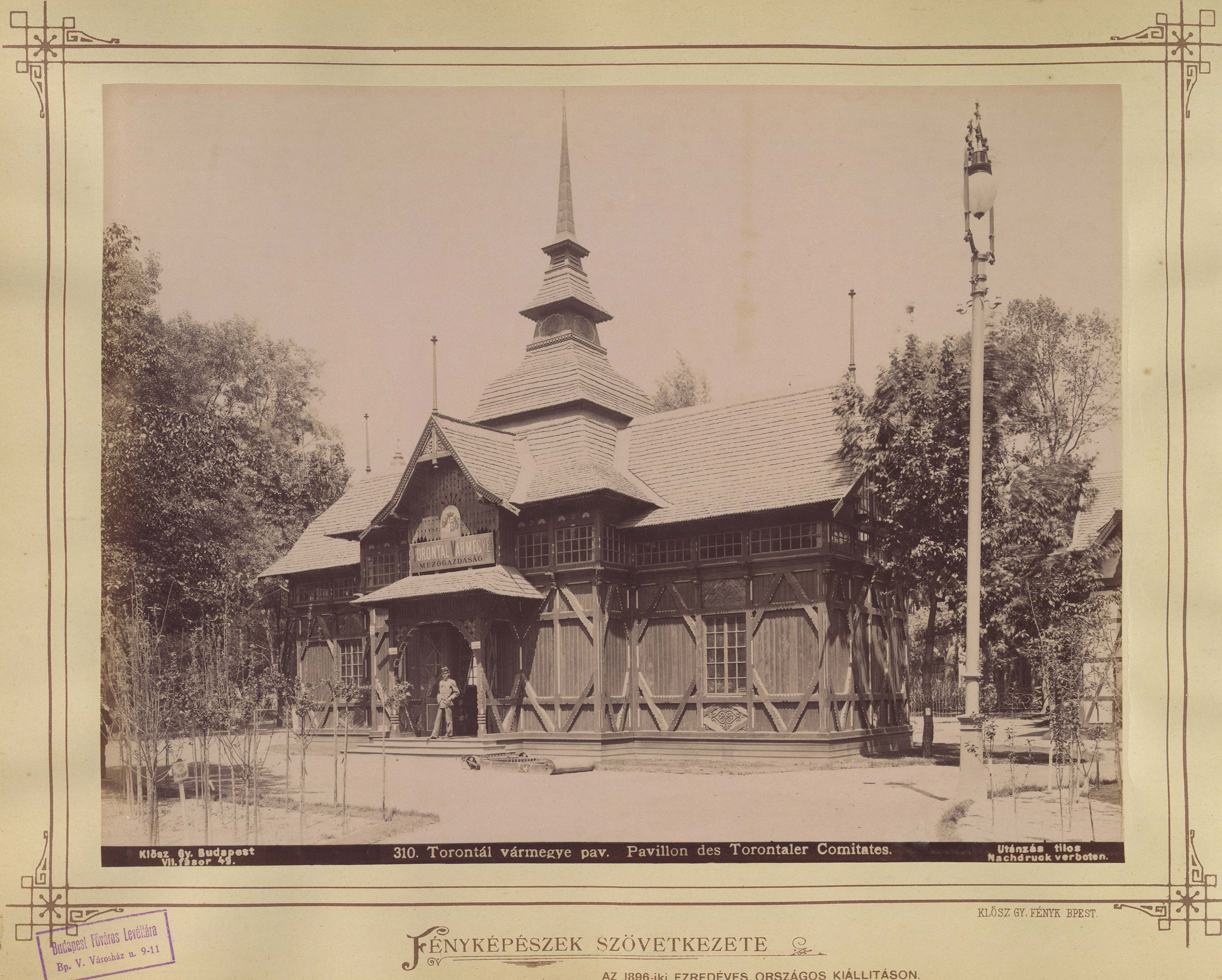
Torontál County Hall at the 1896 Budapest Millennial Exhibition, one of several structures at the fair designed by Jakab.

In 1897, Jakab formed an independent firm with Marcell Komor, which they maintained until 1923, a highly successful partnership that would bring both of them international renown and develop a distinctive architectural aesthetic using the language of Szecesszió. The two won several architectural competitions for major commissions, most of which were ultimately built. Komor was the lead designer, responsible for the conception of the overall building, organization of space, and construction; while Jakab handled the interior design and minute details. They were quite prolific and versatile, designing residential buildings, both villas and collective housing; commercial structures; public buildings; houses of worship; mausoleums; exhibition pavilions; monuments; and institutional structures, throughout what was then Hungary, Austria, and Bulgaria, but now with readjusted national borders includes also locations in Serbia, Romania, and Slovakia.

Komor and Jakab's best-known works include the town halls of Subotica, Serbia (then Szabadka, Hungary; 1908–10) and Târgu Mureș, Romania (then Marosvásárhely, Hungary; 1905–07), the latter of which was complemented shortly after by the neighboring Târgu Mureș Palace of Culture (1911–13). These are very large multi-wing complexes enclosing multiple courtyards, marked by prominent bell towers and a rich array of colorful surfaces, particularly stucco ornamentation and Zsolnay tilework. Much of this ornament is composed of floral and geometric patterns that mimic those on printed or woven textiles. In Subotica, they completed the New Synagogue (1900–02), a design which they recycled from their second-prize entry to the 1899 competition for the neighboring Szeged Synagogue (won and built by Lipót Baumhorn). The multi-domed structure, designed like a tent, features prominent use of Zsolnay ceramics and stained glass with floral decor that also resembles the motifs of peacock feathers. Like its sister in Szeged, the 23-meter-high interior space, with a dome span of 12.6 meters, accommodated a large Jewish community in southern Hungary, seating up to 1600 people, 850 men on the ground floor and 550 women in the gallery, unusually supported by a modern steel structure. It is the only synagogue in Europe built in a Hungarian Szecesszió style. It was designated a national heritage site of great importance in 1974 and was elevated to national heritage site of exceptional importance 1990; in 2018, a complete restoration was finished and it is now open to the public as a UNESCO World Heritage Site.

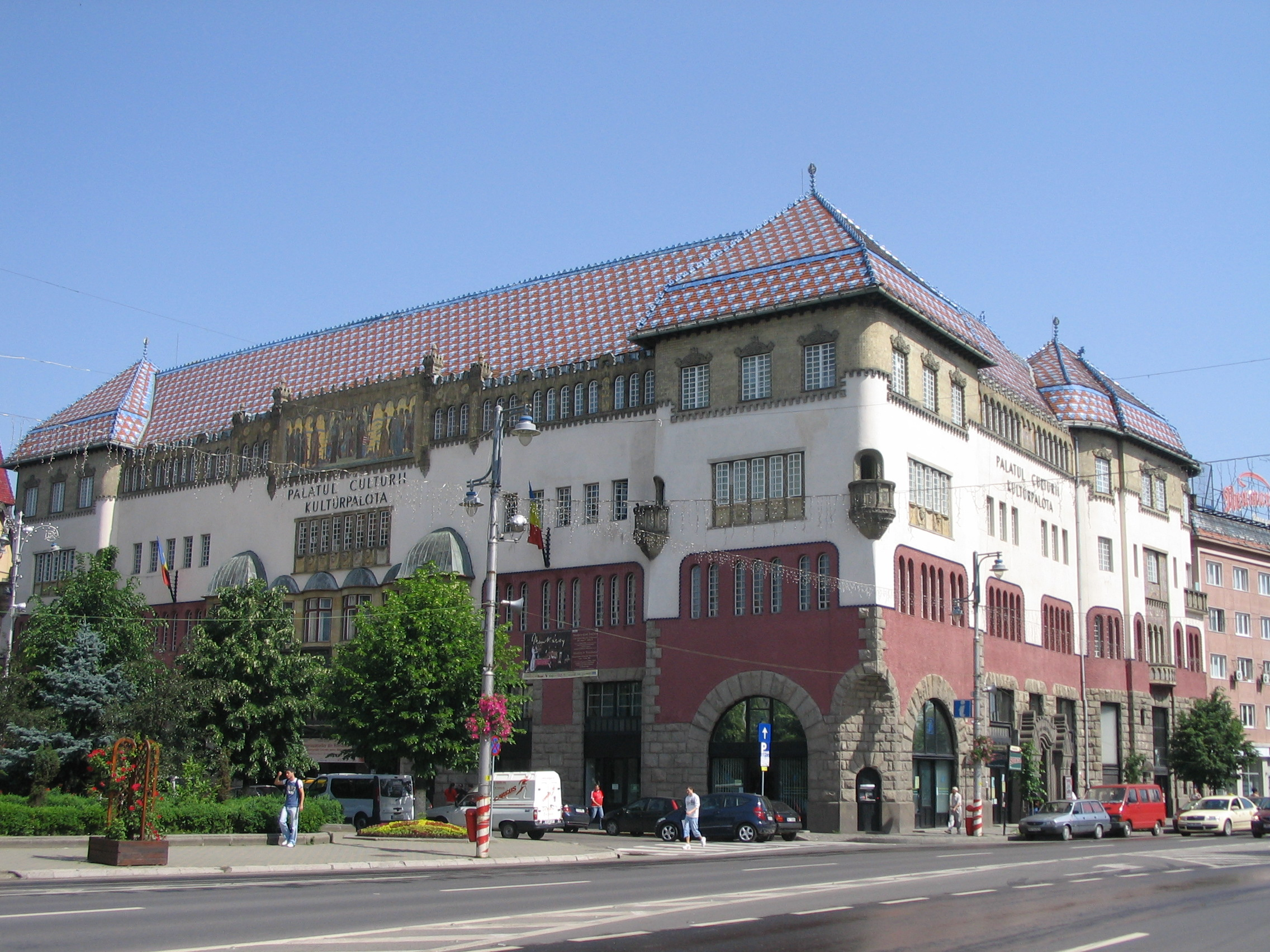
The Palace of Culture in Târgu Mureș (Romania), formerly Marosvásárhely (Hungary), is part of a cluster of Szecesszió-style municipal buildings there built to Komor and Jakab's designs.

Among Komor and Jakab's major commercial buildings are the Black Eagle Hotel in Oradea, Romania (then Nagyvárad, Hungary; 1906–08), which essentially consists of two asymmetrical pavilions, one topped by a prominent turret, joined by a recessed wing; and the Palace Hotel, in Budapest, still a major monument on Rákóczi út. They were commissioned to designed numerous theaters, including ones in Szentes (1897), Bratislava (then called Pozsony, 1906), Deva (1910), and Budapest (the original Erkel Theatre, 1911); and banks in Oradea (1906), Timisoara (1908), Subotica (1907), and Szolnok (1908–09). Their numerous private residential commissions included several vacation villas on the shores of Lake Palić, outside of Subotica, along with numerous other suppplementary structures, including water tower, grand terrace, women's swimming complex, and moemorial fountain. While many of these are marked by their evocations of Hungarian folk architecture, including gables roofs supported by large eaves and brackets, by the beginning of the First World War Komor and Jakab had begun to experiment with a more severe aesthetic that would parallel much modern architecture in Hungary and elsewhere in the 1920s and '30s. With Jakab's son-in-law, Aladár Sós, they designed the National Social Security Institute building on Fiumei út in Budapest in 1912–13, but delays in part caused by the war only permitted its completion in 1930, with a tower crowned by a striking floral crown that was demolished in 1967 due to its unstable bauxite concrete content. The Svábhegy Sanatorium was also a joint project with Sós, with whom he partnered increasingly during the rest of the 1920s. Jakab also participated in competitions for statues and monuments. (Budapest, Plan for the Kossuth Mausoleum, 1902, with Marcell Komor and Márk Vedres; Plan for the Kossuth Statue, 1908, with Marcell Komor and Ede Kallós).

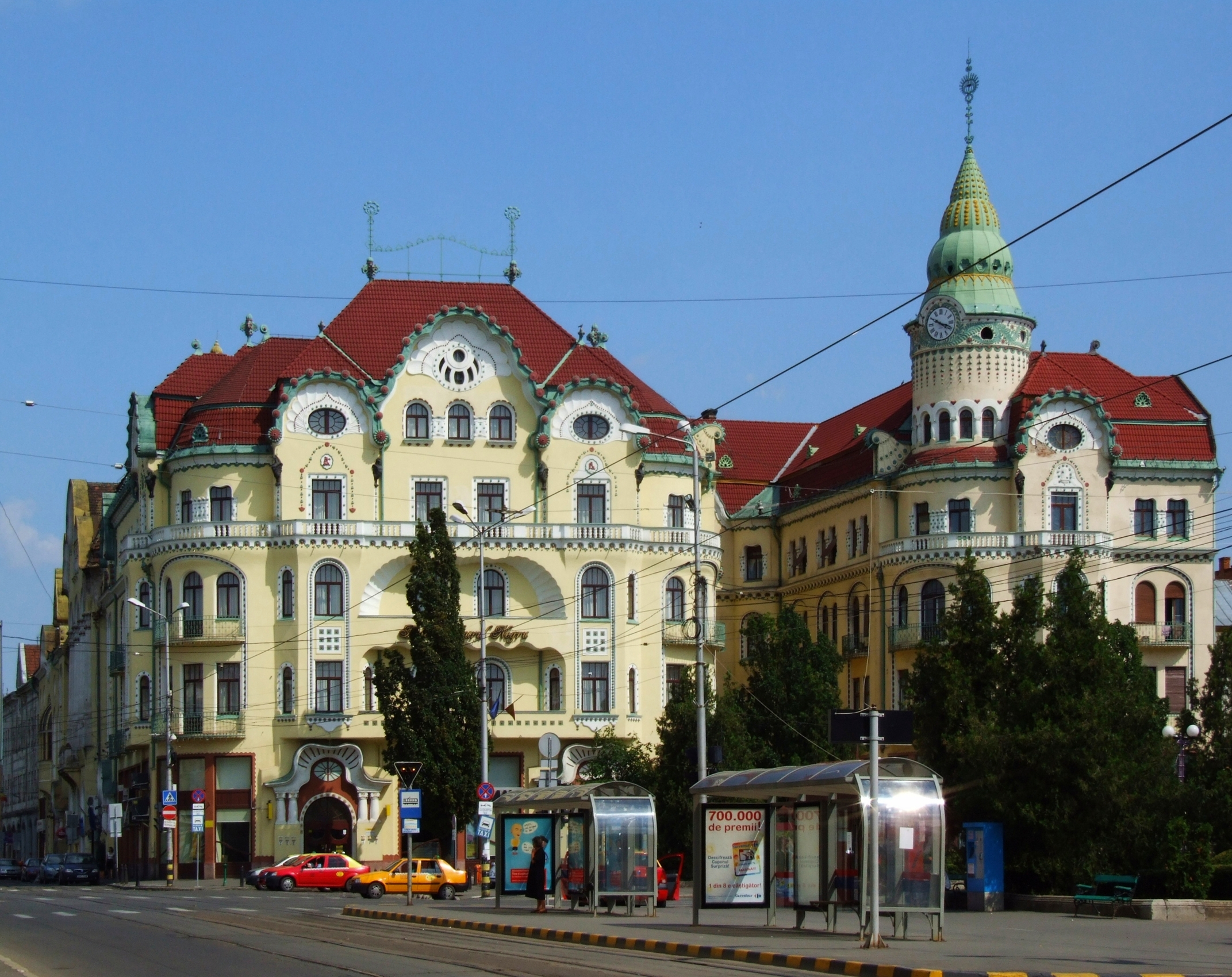
Black Eagle Hotel in Oradea (Romania), probably Komor and Jakab's most outstanding example of hotel design.

Komor and Jakab designed Jakab's house in the fashionable second district of Budapest, in the hilly terrain on the west bank (Buda) of the Danube, at 31 Keleti Károly utca, finished in 1909. (Komor and his family lived at no. 29, next door.) Their office was also located at the same address.

Jakab wrote on architecture, though not as extensively as his partner Komor. His articles were published as "Angol kertvárosok," (in A Ház, 1909, pp. 4–5 and 81–87); "A jelenlegi modern építészetről" (in Vállalkozók Lapja, January 9, 1929, pp. 3–4; January 16, 1929, pp. 3–4); and "Die Gefolgschaft Edmund Lechners," (A Műgyűjtő, 1930, pp. 8–9 and 245–247). For his work, he won the grand gold and silver medals of the Hungarian Society of Engineers and Architects, where he gave several lectures on his study trips. Jakab also gave several lectures on his extensive European study tours at the Hungarian Association of Engineers and Architects, where he won the Grand Gold Medal and the Silver Medal for his work.

== Legacy ==
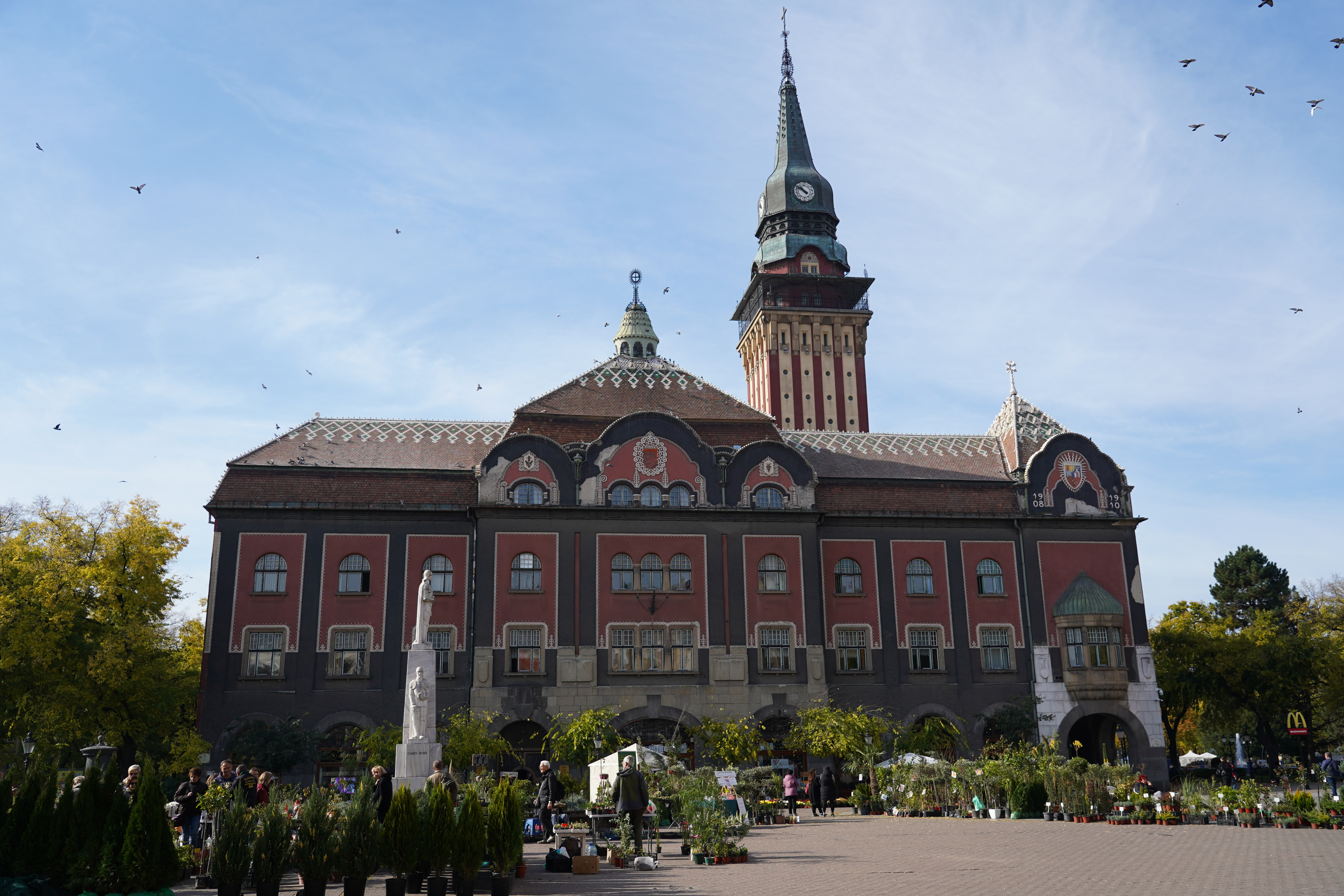
The City Hall of Subotica (1908–10) is one of Komor and Jakab's major works and an outstanding example of Szecesszió architecture.

Art Nouveau (including Hungarian Szecesszió) architecture has seen a renewed interest from scholars and architecture enthusiasts since the 1990s, particularly with the advent of the European Union and the attempts to build a shared continental cultural heritage. Organizations such as the Reseau Art Nouveau Network (RANN) have been founded dedicated to the promotion and preservation of the style in the built environment and decorative arts, and most of the cities where Komor and Jakab's architecture is located have joined such organizations as municipal/institutional members. These developments have also been strengthened by the collapse of the Eastern bloc and the new accessibility of Central and Eastern Europe to tourists and scholars from the rest of Europe and North America. Komor and Jakab's architecture has thus been "rediscovered" (or, perhaps, discovered for the first time) as a key component of the construction of a distinctly Hungarian identity in the built environment in the Austro-Hungarian monarchy at the dawn of the twentieth century. Today much Szecesszió architecture is undergoing or awaiting refurbishment or renovation and being landmarked as key pieces of cultural heritage in many of the countries that made up the Hungarian half of the Habsburg monarchy before 1918, often by international organizations such as UNESCO as a World Heritage Site or the World Monuments Fund.

== Works ==
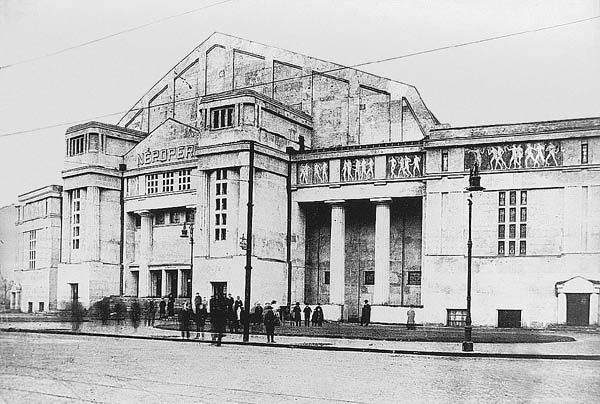
The Folk Opera (Erkel Theater) in Budapest, shortly after Komor and Jakab finished it using designs of Géza Márkus in 1911.

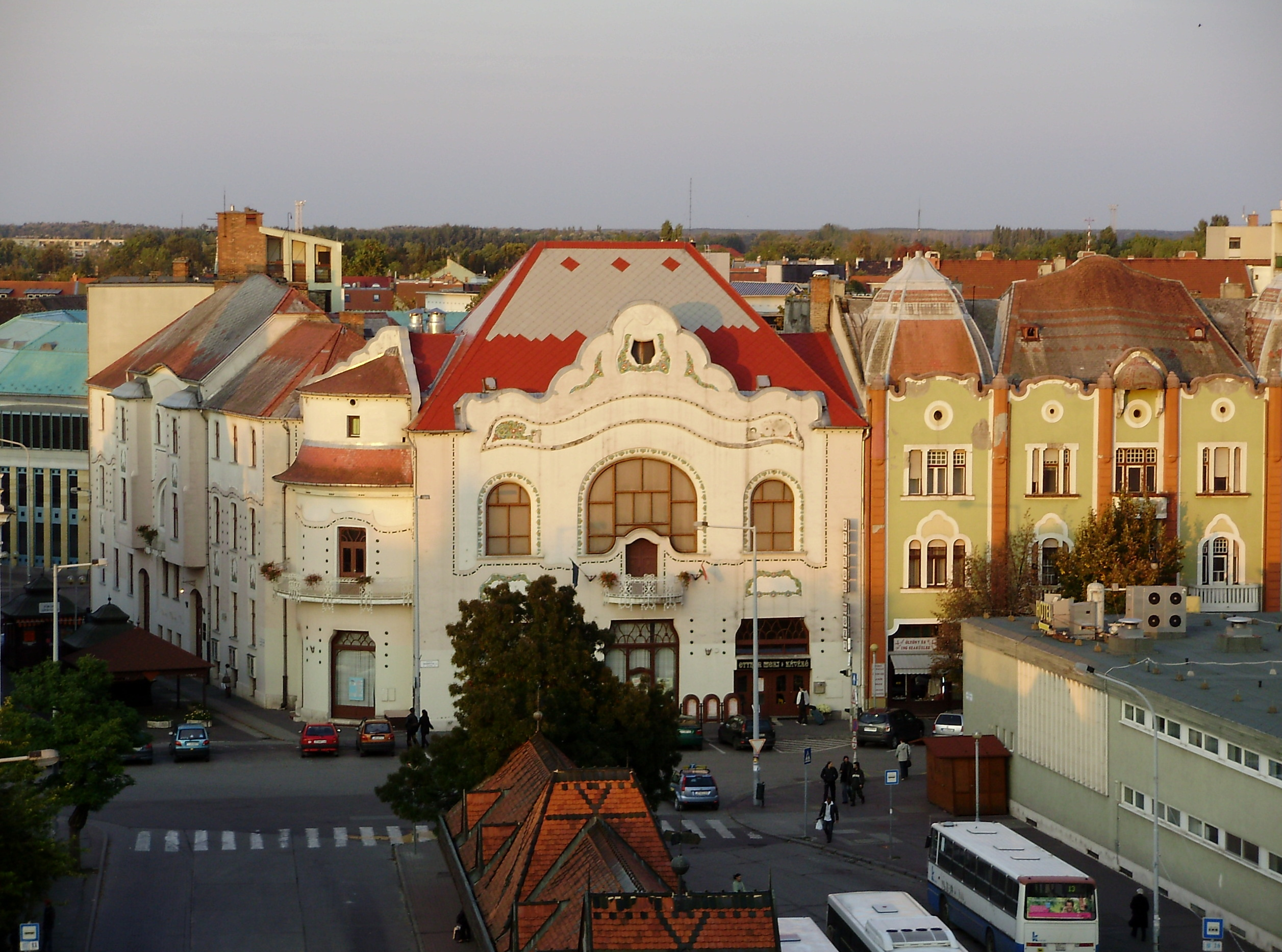
The Kecskemet Youth (Industrial) Home (1904–07) was one of the few buildings of this type designed by Komor or Jakab.

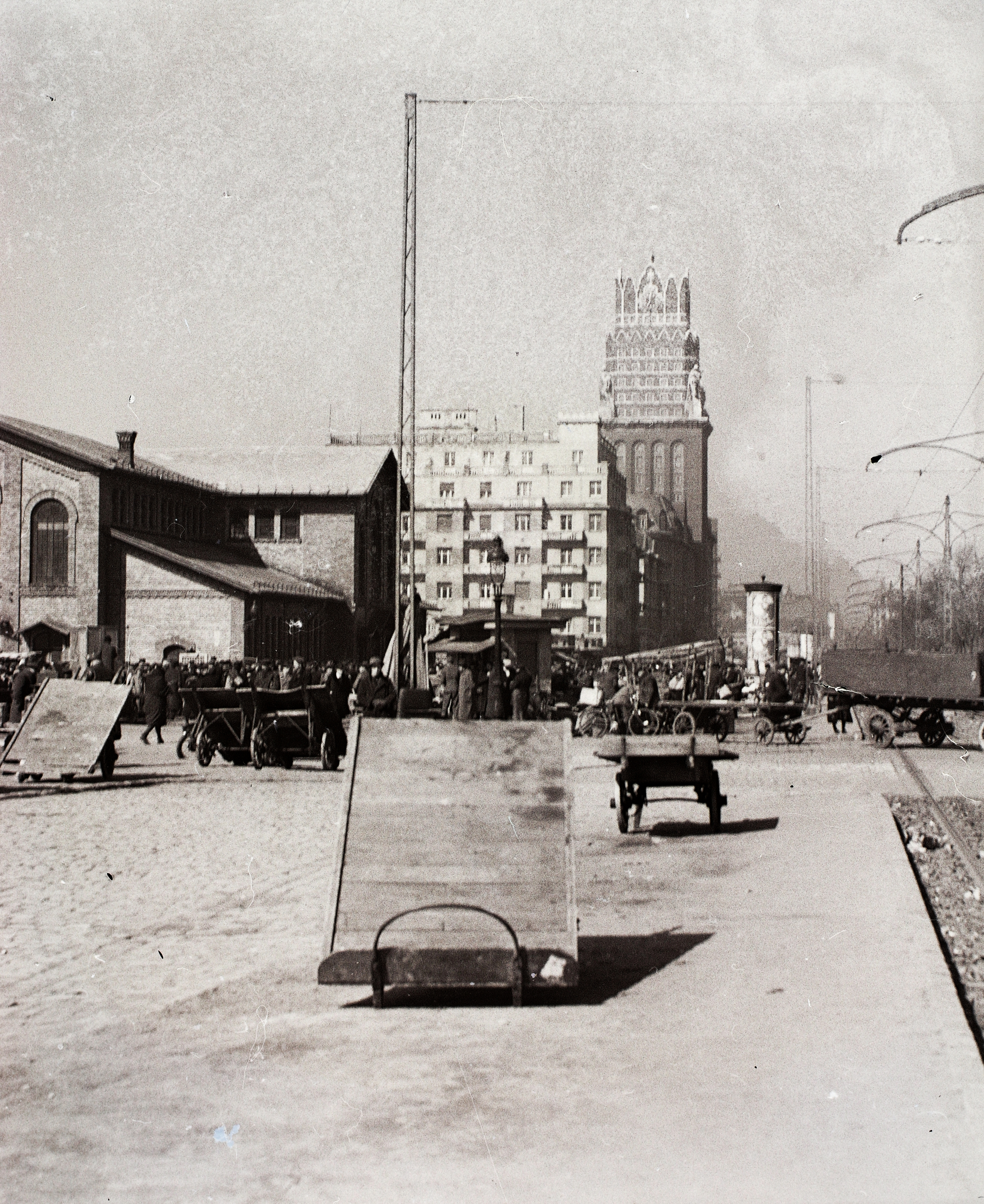
Komor and Jakab and Aladár Sós' Budapest District Workers' Insurance Headquarters on Fiumei út in Budapest (1911–13) was notable for its tower's high crown, removed in 1967 for structural reasons, shown here in a 1940 photograph.

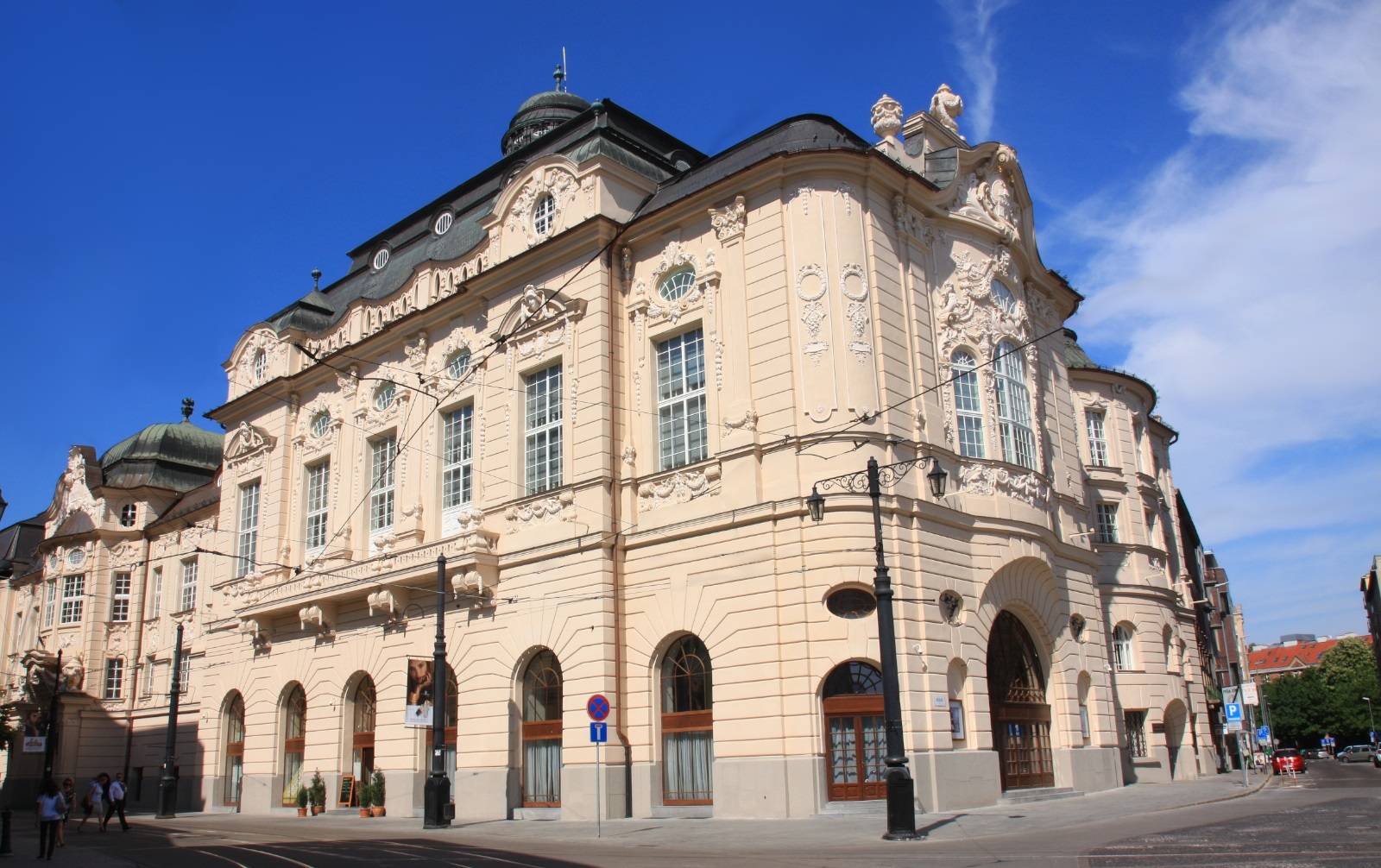
The Reduta concert Hall in Bratislava (Slovakia), then Pozsony (Hungary), built 1911–19, was one of the few Baroque-revival buildings by Komor and Jakab.

Note: this is not an exhaustive list.

With Marcell Komor:

- 1890–1900: Szentes. Petőfi Hotel and Theatre. Competition: 1st prize and construction
- 1898–1900: Szolnok. Gorove utca 5 (today Lajos Kossuth utca 5). Szolnok Agricultural Savings Bank headquarters
- 1898: Hungarian Pavilion for the 1900 Exposition Universelle, Paris. Competition: 2nd prize
- 1899: Szeged. Synagogue. Competition entry, unbuilt
- 1899: Budapest. Commodity and Stock Exchange. Competition entry, unbuilt
- 1900: Budapest, VI district, residential building at Csengery utca 76
- 1900–02: Subotica. Synagogue. Competition: 1st prize, and construction
- 1901: Pécs. Main post office. Competition: 3rd prize
- 1902: Bratislava. Chamber of Commerce and Industry. Competition: 1st prize
- 1902: Budapest-Kossuth Mausoleum. Competition entry (with sculptor Márk Vedres)
- 1903: Budapest, XIII. Radnóti Miklós Street 4–6. Residential building (renovation)
- 1904: Kiskunfélegyháza. Central school. Competition: 2nd prize (with Mihály Gesztesi)
- 1905: Budapest. Sáros-fürdő. Competition and commission (with Géza Márkus)dead link
- 1904–07: Kecskemét. Széchenyi Square 7/Kossuth Square 4. Industrial home (now Youth Home). Competition: 1st prize and construction
- 1905: Budapest. Statue of Liberty. Competition entry (with Géza Márkus and sculptor Ede Kallós)
- 1905: Kiskunhalas. Hotel. Competition: Shared 1st prize (with Géza Márkus)
- 1905–06: Oradea. Patriotilor utca 4–6. Adorján Houses
- 1905: Nagyszalonta. Town Hall. Competition: 2nd prize
- 1905: Marcali Synagogue (rebuilt)
- 1905–10: Târgu Mureș. Town Hall. Competition: 1st prize; commission
- 1906: Oradea. Chamber of Commerce and Industry. Competition: 1st prize
- 1906: Oradea. Black Eagle Hotel. Competition: 1st prize; and construction, 1907–1908
- 1906: Oradea. Savings Bank. Competition: 2nd prize.
- 1906: Bratislava. City entertainment and music palace
- 1907–10: Subotica. City Hall (built 1908–1910)
- 1907: Subotica. Commercial Bank Limited
- 1907: Budapest. Workers' Sickness Relief Headquarters. Competition entry and commission
- 1908: Budapest, I. Döbrentei Square residential building (destroyed)
- 1908: Vienna, Austria. Ministry of War. Competition: 3rd prize
- 1908: Timisoara, Romania. Commercial Bank
- 1908–09: Szolnok. Commercial Bank and Savings Bank (destroyed)
- 1908–09: Oradea. Stern Palace
- 1908–09: Budapest, VI. Benczúr utca 47. Liget Sanatorium
- 1909: Palic (Serbia). Vigadó building
- 1909–10: Budapest, VI. Színyei Merse utca 21. Lefèvre House
- 1909–10: Budapest, II. Keleti Károly utca 29–31. Komor and Jakab's own office and residence
- 1909–10: Budapest, VIII. Hegedüs Gyula utca 94. Small apartment building
- 1910: Târgu Mureș (Marosvásárhely). Administrative Palace of Maros-Torda County. Competition: 1st prize, and commission
- 1910: Deva, theater
- 1910: Budapest, VIII. Rákóczi út 43. Palace Hotel
- 1910: Budapest District Workers' Insurance Fund. Design competition: 1st prize, and commission
- 1911: Budapest Bank Rt. Palace. Design competition entry and commission
- 1911: Budapest, VII. Dózsa György út 84. Park sanatorium (demolished)
- 1911: The former People's Opera (now the Erkel Theatre; using the designs of Géza Márkus)
- 1911–13: Târgu Mureș (Marosvásárhely). Cultural Palace
- 1911–13: Budapest, VIII. Fiumei út 19: Budapest District Workers' Insurance Headquarters (with Aladár Sós; tower demolished in 1967)
- 1911–19: Bratislava. Reduta Concert Hall
- 1912: Budapest. Buda Synagogue
- 1912–14: Murány. Palace of Tsar Ferdinand I of Bulgaria. Competition: 1st prize, and commission
- 1913: Budapest National Theatre

With Aladár Sós:

- 1923–27: Budapest XII., Eötvös út 11–14 Svábhegy Sanatorium
- 1929: Budapest II., Borbolya utca 4. Residential building
- 1929–31: Budapest VIII., Fiumei út 19. Expansion of the Budapest District Workers' Insurance Headquarters
- 1932: Budapest II., Bimbó út 12/Mész utca 4/a. Residential building

== Sources ==
- Magyar zsidó lexikon. Ed. Péter Ujvári. Budapest: Magyar Zsidó Lexikon, 1929. p. 413.
