= Eugen Todoran Central University Library =

Library in Timișoara, Romania

- Biblioteca Centrală Universitară „Eugen Todoran”
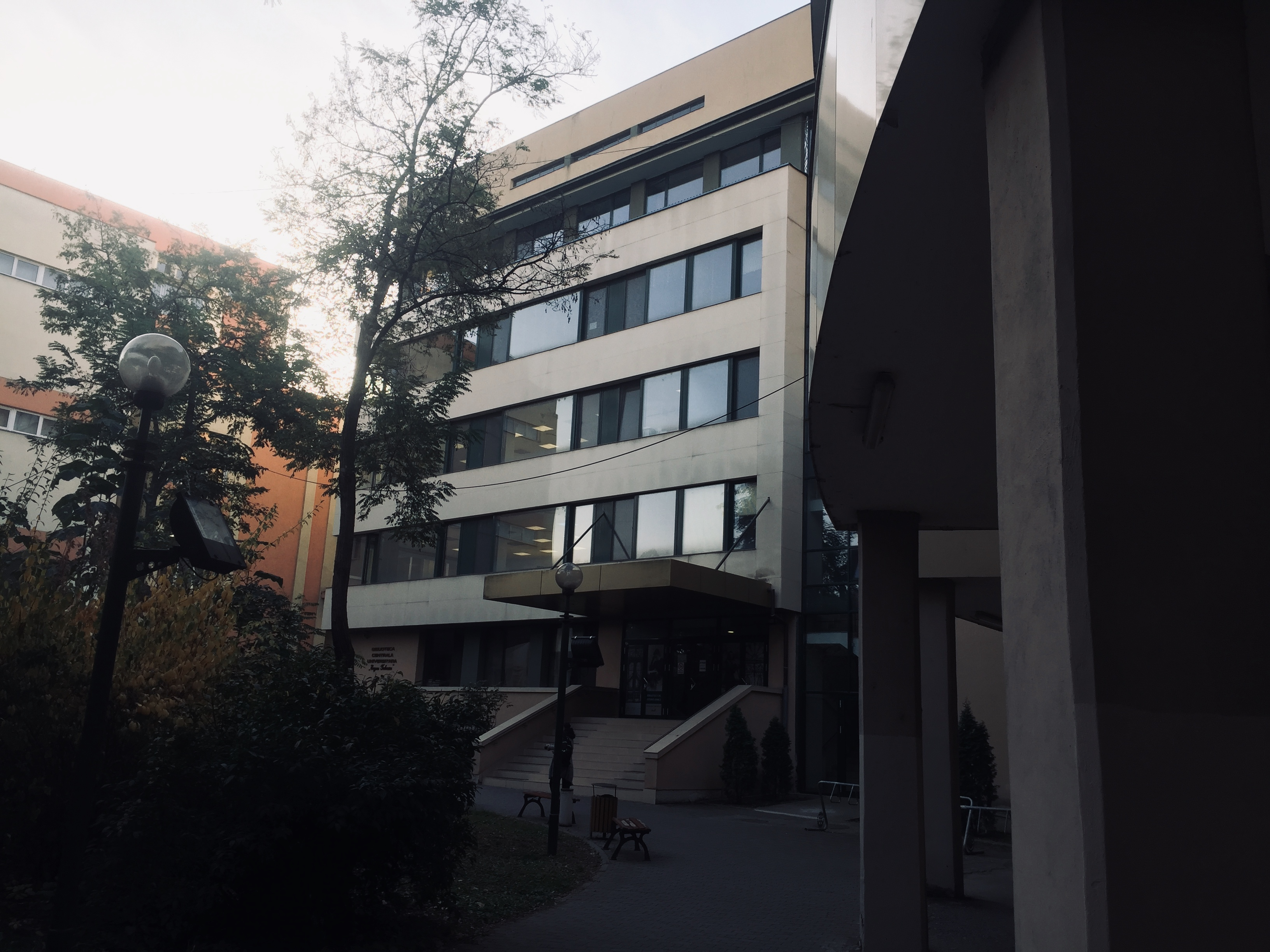
- 45°44′50″N 21°13′57″E
- Location: 4A Vasile Pârvan Boulevard, Timișoara
- Type: Academic library
- Established: 30 December 1944; 81 years ago
- Branches: 7

Collection
- Size: 1,176,914 (2019)
- Legal deposit: Yes (since 1975)

Access and use
- Circulation: 157,584 (2019)

Other information
- Budget: RON 6,798,000 (2019)
- Director: Vasile Docea
- Employees: 84 (2019)
- Website: bcut.ro

Eugen Todoran Central University Library (abbreviated BCUT) is an academic library in Timișoara. Founded in 1944, it serves the West University of Timișoara (UVT). The library is subordinated and funded by the Ministry of National Education. BCUT provides access to over one million volumes, books, journals and other documents. The library has a headquarters, consisting of two buildings, branch libraries located in the UVT faculty buildings, as well as the Austrian and British libraries.

BCUT is part of the consortium of central university libraries in Romania, which allows it to make shared purchases of journals and scientific databases and use the electronic collective catalog, thus giving users the possibility to quickly access the documentary funds of similar libraries in Bucharest, Cluj-Napoca and Iași.

== History ==
The creation of an academic library in Timișoara was established by Decree-Law no. 660 of 30 December 1944, issued by King Michael I. At first, the library's bookstock consisted mainly of mathematics and physics books and journals. After the Faculty of Philology was founded in 1956, the library of the Pedagogical Institute acquired an encyclopedic profile and was continuously enriched. Since 1962, with the transformation of the Pedagogical Institute into a university, the Central Library of the University of Timișoara has developed rapidly. Since 1975, it has been entitled to a legal deposit.

Since 1992, by Order of the Minister of Education no. 6237 of 14 September 1992, the Library of the University of Timișoara became the Central University Library, an institution of national interest, with legal personality, similar to those in Bucharest, Cluj-Napoca and Iași. Since 8 February 2000, the Central University Library of Timișoara has officially been named after Romanian philologist Eugen Todoran who, as rector of the West University, supported its transformation into a central university library.

Upon establishment, the Eugen Todoran Central University Library took over the material base and the staff of the former Library of the West University. From the beginning, the library operated in its own building (built in 1978), with two adjoining bodies (reading room and storage room), located in the immediate vicinity of the West University. In 1994, a small commercial space was added to this complex (first a bookshop, then a café), which in turn became part of the library's patrimony. In 2008, another building was put into use, attached to the two oldest ones, including reading rooms, storerooms and administrative spaces.

== Collections and branch libraries ==
As of 2019, BCUT's bookstock consisted of 1,176,914 volumes, 1,422 manuscripts, 3,423 microfilms, 1,564 audio documents, 127 video documents, 4,329 multimedia documents, 3,233 electronic collections (books, periodicals and databases) and 8,466 documents from other categories.

The following branch libraries are organized in the headquarters of some UVT faculties:

- plastic arts;
- chemistry and biology;
- law;
- physical education and sports;
- music;
- economics;
- Orthodox theology.

== See also ==
- List of libraries in Romania
