= Vilmos Zsolnay =

Hungarian industrialist and entrepreneur

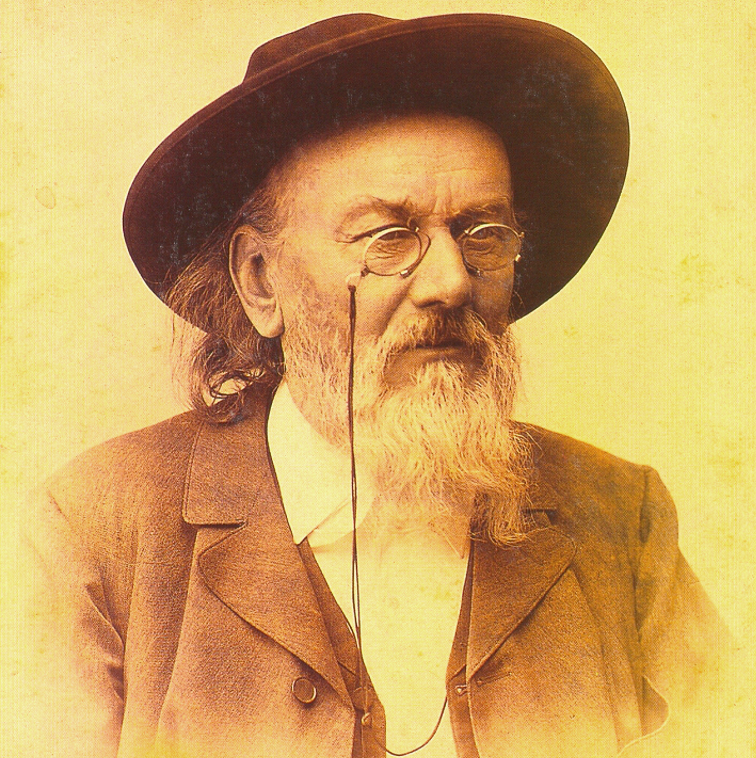
- Born: 19 April 1828; Pécs, Hungary
- Died: 12 March 1900 (aged 71); Pécs, Hungary
- Occupation: Industrialist

Vilmos Zsolnay (19 April 1828 in Pécs – 23 March 1900 in Pécs) was a Hungarian industrialist and entrepreneur. As the director of the Zsolnay porcelain manufacture he introduced new materials and inventions into the manufacture of pottery and ceramics and led the company to world-wide recognition.

== Early life and education ==
Zsolnay was born on 19 April 1828 in Pécs. He studied at Vienna's Polytechnical High School.

== Business career ==
In 1863, he returned and joined his father company, The Zsolnay factory, to eventually take over its management. He was able to attract talented artists to work for him, and under his directorship the small family-owned company grew into a world-renowned enterprise. The introduction of new techniques and materials was important in this development. With Vince Wartha, Zsolnay discovered the eosin process that gives articles an iridescent glaze in multiple colors. Pyrogranite is a ceramic building material that he introduced and that became popular with the architects of the Hungarian Art Nouveau movement. He displayed his products at several World expositions, and was honored with the French Légion d'honneur and the Order of Franz Joseph in recognition of his artistic work.

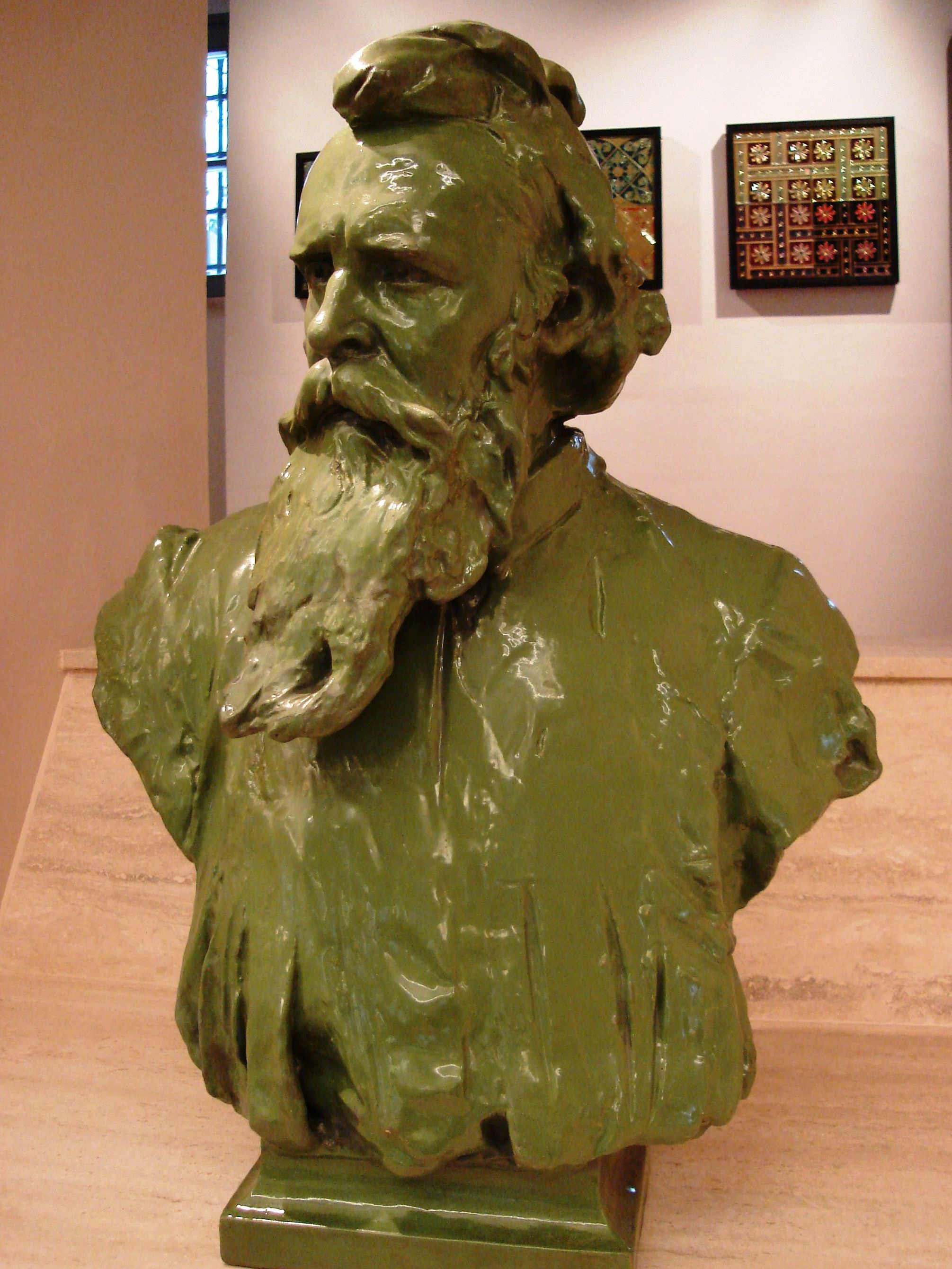
Faience bust of Vilmos Zsolnay (1828-1900), Hungarian ceramist and china industrialist in the ’Museum Zsolnay’ in Pécs (Hungary)

As a designer, he was major employer for visual artists like Ármin Klein, and his doughters Terez and Julia as well as Sándor Apáti Abt, and several others. Important architects of his time were delighted to use Zsolnay's ceramics, e.g.:

- Imre Steindl
- Ödön Lechner
- Aladár Árkay
- Flóris Korb
- Kálmán Giergl
- Béla Lajta
- Samu Pecz
- J. Ferenc Raichle
- Frigyes Schulek

== Death and legacy ==
After he died on 23 March 1900, his son Miklós Zsolnay took over the management of the manufacture.

In 1907 the city of Pécs inaugurated a statue of Vilmos Zsolnay, the first known statue in Hungary in the honour of someone other than statesmen or clergy, highlighting his importance in the contemporary development of commerce and industry. The statue is one of main touristic landmarks of the city.

== See also ==
- Zsolnay family
