= Flóris Korb =

Hungarian architect (1860–1930)

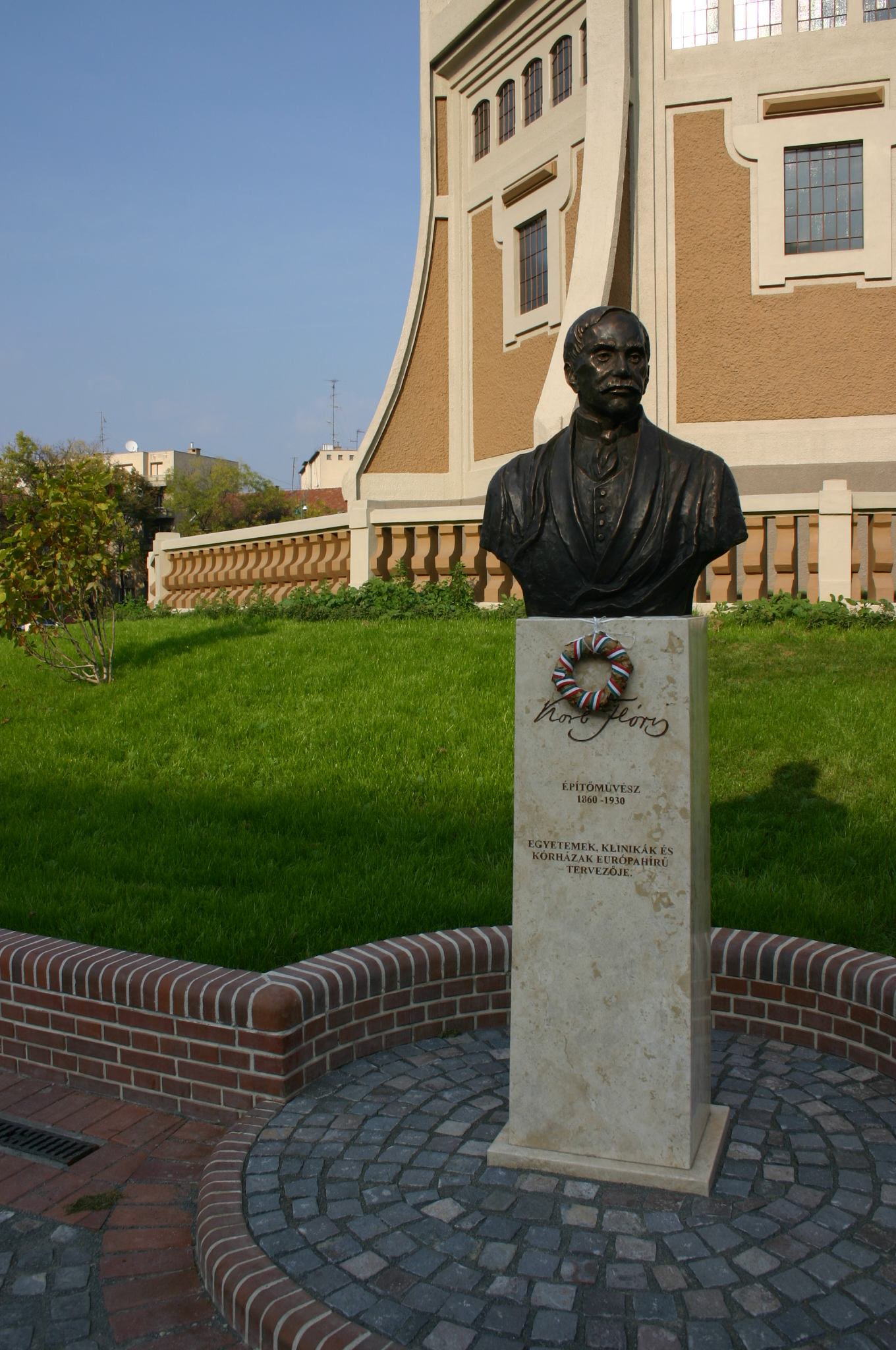
- Statue of Flóris Korb
- Born: Flóris Nándor Korb; 7 April 1860; Kecskemét, Habsburg Empire
- Died: 16 September 1930; Budapest, Hungary
- Education: TU Berlin, Berlin
- Occupation: Architect

Flóris Korb (born as Flóris Nándor Korb, Kecskemét, 7 April 1860 – Budapest, 16 September 1930) was a Hungarian architect.

== Career ==
After finishing his studies in Berlin, he returned to Budapest to work under Alajos Hauszmann for fourteen years, during which time he took part in designing the New York Palace. In 1893, he entered into a partnership with Kálmán Giergl, which resulted in many important commissions in the developing capital. Korb was awarded the Greguss prize in 1924 and was admitted into the Royal Institute of British Architects.

== Works ==
- New York Palace, with Hauszmann & Giergl (1891–95)
- Croatian Art Pavilion at the Millennium Exhibition in Budapest (1896), with Giergl
- Klotild Palaces, Budapest (1899–1902) hu:Klotild paloták
- Kiraly Apartments, Budapest (1900–01)
- Franz Liszt Academy of Music, Budapest (1904–07)
- Clinic buildings, Mari and Ulloi ut, Budapest
- Central University Library of Cluj-Napoca (w. Kálmán Giergl, 1904–1909)
- Commercial Savings and Insurance Bank (today Press Building), Kecskemét (1909–12)
- Mint Building, Budapest
- Debrecen University, (1914–30)
- Zielinski Water Tower, Szeged (1903–04)
