= Kálmán Giergl =

Hungarian architect

- Born: Koloman Giergl; 29 June 1863; Pest, Hungary, Habsburg Empire
- Died: 10 September 1954; Verőce, Hungary
- Education: Berlin University of the Arts, Berlin; Technical University of Budapest, Budapest
- Occupation: Architect
- Practice: Alajos Hauszmann
- Buildings: Klotild Palace, Budapest; New York Palace, Budapest; Art Pavilion, Zagreb; Central University Library, Cluj

Kálmán Giergl (born as Koloman Giergl, 29 June 1863 in Pest, Hungary, Austrian Empire – 10 September 1954 in Verőce, Hungary), was a Hungarian-German architect and a significant figure in the Austro-Hungarian eclectic architectural style. A member of the Györgyi-Giergl artistic family.

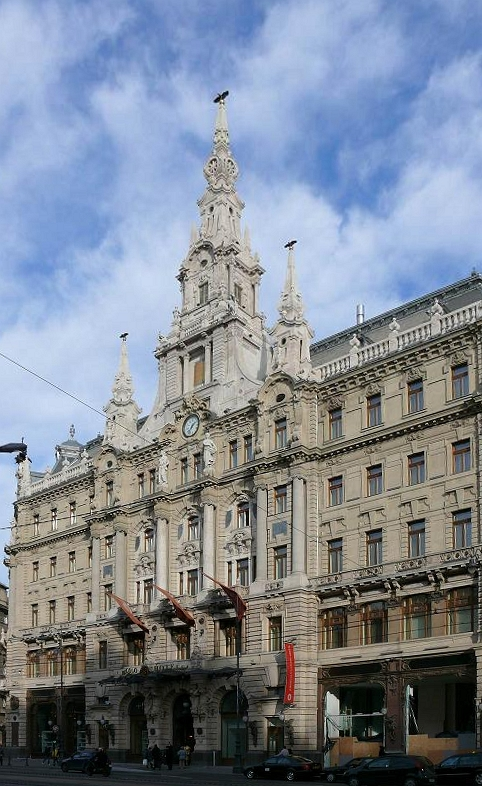
The New York Palace

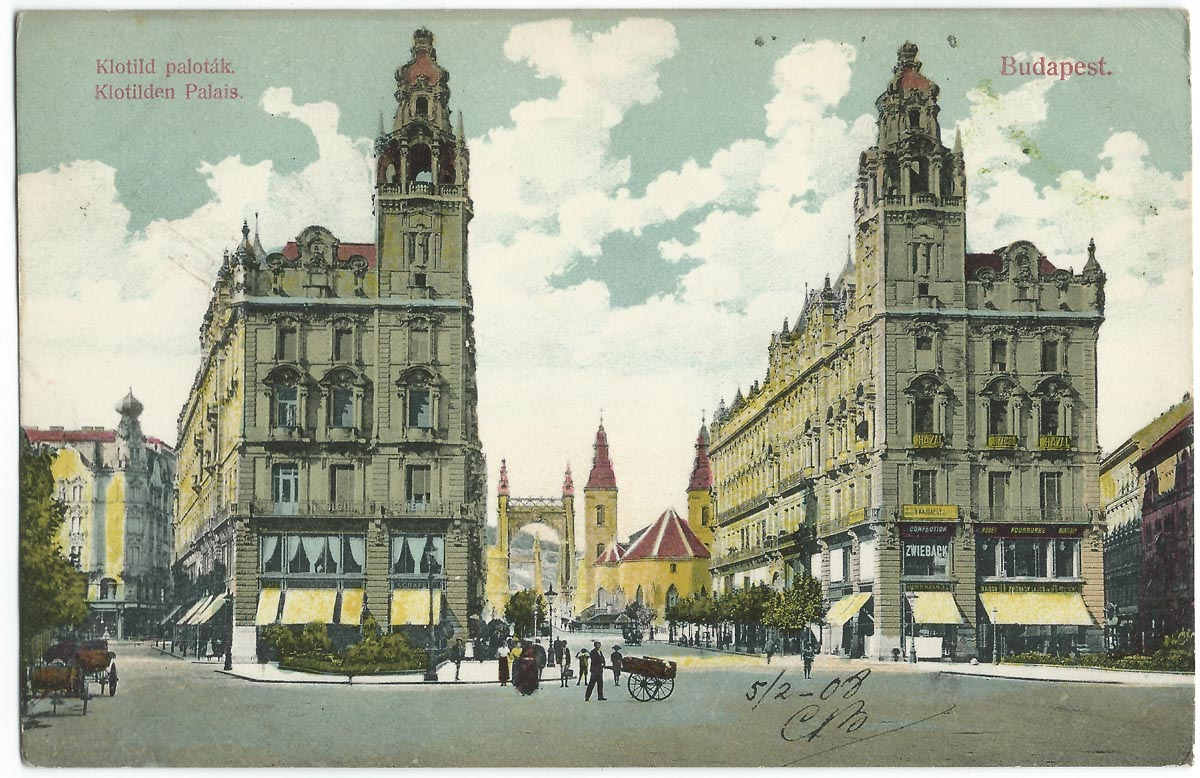
Klotild Palaces

== Family background ==
Giergl's family originated from the Tyrol region but for generations were known for their artistic endeavors in Pest. His father Henrik Giergl (1827–1871) was a famous glass artist and among his cousins were Géza Györgyi (hu) (1851–1934) who was an architect and Kálmán Györgyi (hu) (1860–1930) who was an expert on applied arts.

== Career ==
Giergl finished his studies at Budapest Technical University and the Berlin University of the Arts. He also began his career working for the Gropius and Schmieden company of Martin Gropius and Heino Schmieden in the Berlin. Upon his return to Budapest, he came to work under Alajos Hauszmann at the Budapest Technical University. This is the period when he also began to work with the other rising star of the Hauszmann office, Flóris Korb (1860–1930). They both took part in working on major commissions such as the Palace of Justice, New York Palace and the extension to the Buda Palace all in the capital. In 1893 the two established their own partnership, their first major work being the Pesti Hirlap headquarters and also some of the many now demolished pavilions for Hungary's 1896 Millennial Exhibition. They built the twin Klotild Palaces on the approach to the Elizabeth bridge in 1901 and won the competition for the Music Academy building. This building, built between 1904 and 1907, is their major work. Subsequent projects include the Maria street eye clinic and Üllői street wound and general clinics. It is unclear when they finished working together: some sources say 1906, others 1909 or even 1914. Giergl traveled extensively throughout Europe, America and the near and far East. Notes of his travels and collections of applied arts from these areas are housed in the Budapest Museum of Applied Arts.

== Works ==
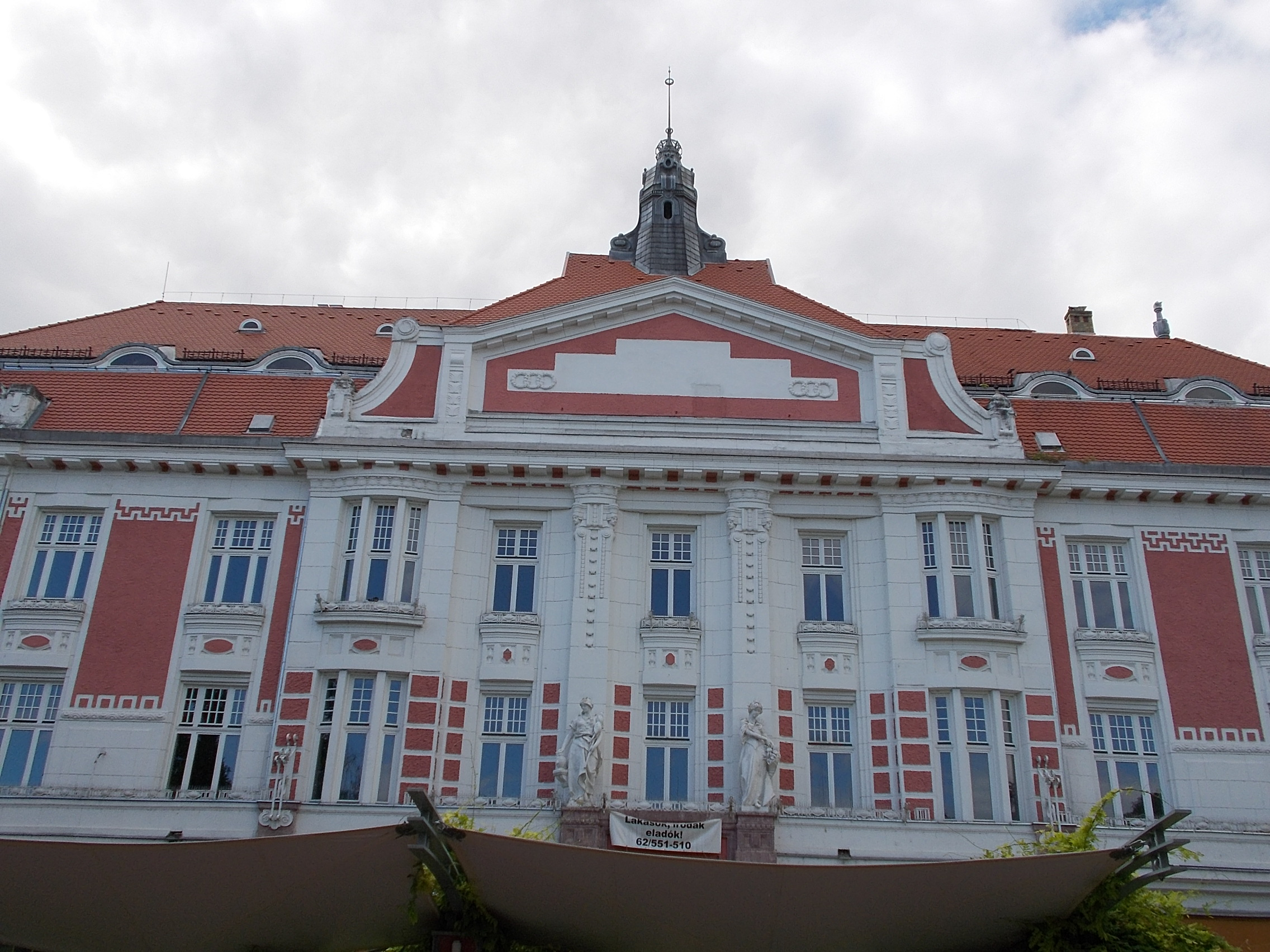
Kereskedelmi Ipar Hitelintézet és Népbank, Kecskemet, by Korb and Giergl

- New York Palace, Budapest (with Hauszmann & Korb, 1894)
- Palace of Justice, Budapest
- Klotild Palace, Budapest (with Korb, 1901)
- Király Apartment, Budapest (with Korb, 1902)
- Liszt Ferenc Academy of Music, Budapest (with Korb, 1907)

== See also ==
- Dénes Györgyi
- Györgyi-Giergl family (Hungarian: Györgyi-Giergl művészcsalád)
