= Sorin Titel County Library =

Public library in Timișoara, Romania

- Biblioteca Județeană „Sorin Titel”
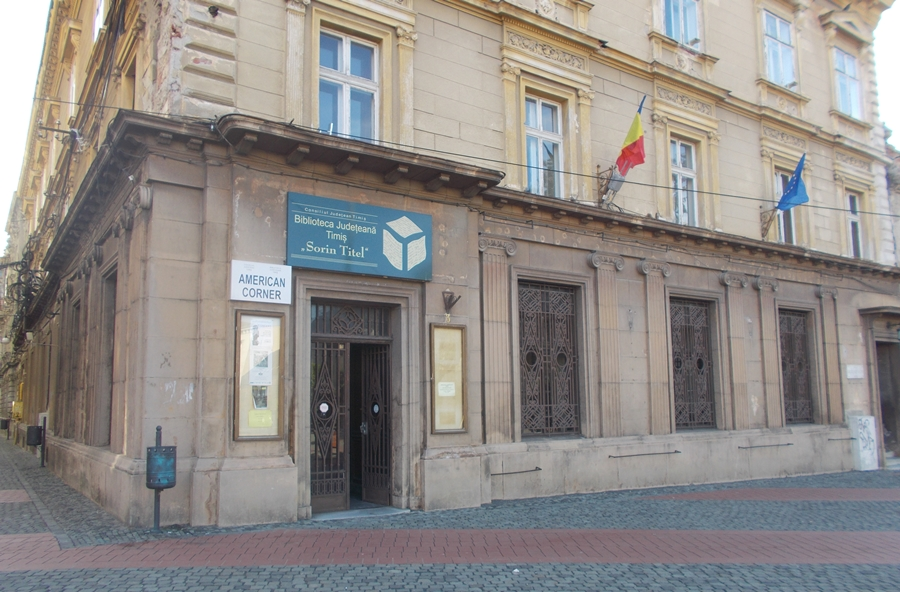
- 45°45′19″N 21°13′41″E
- Location: 3 Liberty Square, Timișoara
- Type: Public
- Established: 29 October 1904; 121 years ago
- Branches: 6

Collection
- Size: 744,018

Access and use
- Circulation: 41,500 (2017)

Other information
- Budget: RON 4,250,000 (2017)
- Director: Tudor Crețu
- Employees: 29 (2018)
- Website: www.bjt.ro

Sorin Titel County Library is a public library in Timișoara, Romania subordinated to the Timiș County Council. Founded in 1904, the library offers its readers about 750,000 publications – books, periodicals and other graphic and audio-visual documents – in Romanian and in foreign languages. In 2012 and 2013, the institution was awarded the prize for best library at Bun de Tipar, within the Romanian Book Industry Gala.

== History ==
The idea of a public library, which would provide access to all those interested in reading or informing, appeared in the 19th century, when Josef Klapka founded in Timișoara in 1815 the first public loan library with a reading room in the Habsburg Empire. In 1870, three popular libraries operated in Timișoara, the book fund of which was available to the inhabitants of the Fabric, Iosefin and Elisabetin districts. With the establishment of the Romanian Reading Reunion, in 1873, a library was opened in the Fabric district.

On 30 June 1903, the local jurisdictional commission decided to establish a public library with a scientific profile. At the recommendation of the members of the commission, the cultural associations and reunions in Timișoara, together with personalities of the city, donate important publication funds to the newly established library. It was inaugurated on 29 October 1904. It started its activity with a publication fund of 27,850 volumes. From 1940 to 1952, the library operated within the headquarters at 7 Voltaire Street. The current headquarters are located at 3 Liberty Square. The first branch libraries opened in 1968.

In 2015, by a decision of the Timiș County Council, the library was named after Sorin Titel (1935–1985), a post-war Romanian novelist.

== Branch libraries ==
- Blașcovici (2 Captain Dan Street)
- Casa Tineretului (19 Arieș Street)
- Fabric (1 Costache Negruzzi Street)
- Fabric-Vii (10 Pomiculturii Street)
- Freidorf (10 Podgoriei Street)
- Mehala (6 Avram Iancu Street)

== See also ==
- List of libraries in Romania
