= Dénes Györgyi =

Hungarian architect (1886–1961)

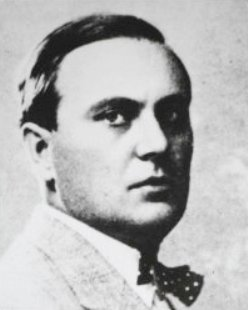
Dénes Györgyi

Dénes Györgyi (April 25, 1886 – November 25, 1961) was a Hungarian architect, a member of the Györgyi-Giergl artistic family.

== Biography ==
=== Family background ===
Gyorgyi was born in Budapest into a well-known clan of artists which stretched back generations. On his father's side, his great grandfather, Alajos Giergl (1793–1868) was a silversmith who originated from the Tyrol and his grandfather, Alajos Györgyi Giergl (1821–1863), was a well-known painter in Pest. His father, Kálmán Györgyi (1860–1930) was a craftsman and art theorist, the director of the National Society of Applied Arts and editor of its journal. Two other close relatives, Géza Gyorgyi (1851–1934) and Kálmán Giergl (1863–1934) were well known architects. The latter built the Music Academy and Klotild Palaces in Pest. Also notable in the clan was Henrik Giergl (1827–1871), a glass artist and trader.

== Career ==
Gyorgyi began studying architecture at the Budapest Joseph Technical University, where he met his slightly older contemporary Károly Kós. Together they formed a unique partnership and, most significantly, they built the Városmajor Street school in Budapest.

On his own, Györgyi designed the Hangya Associated Office building (1920) and many other schools and public buildings in regional cities, for example the Copf-style Deri Museum in Debrecen. He also designed numerous pavilions for world fairs: the 1929 Barcelona International Exposition, the Brussels International Exposition (1935), and the Paris Exposition Internationale des Arts et Techniques dans la Vie Moderne (1937). He designed the Electricity Works at Budapest's Székesfőváros (1926–1938), which incorporated art deco and modernist elements.

In 1945, Györgyi lost his only son and his last work was to be competed 3 years later, a primary school at Balatonalmádi where he lived his final years. He briefly became involved in the Hungarian People's Republic offices of State Planning during the 1950s, but illness prevented this from continuing. Györgyi died in Balatonalmádi. His collaborator Kós considered him "One of the outstanding architects in Hungary of that sorrowful and dark period between the wars".

== Buildings ==
- 1910-1920
  - Hungarian pavilion at the World Fair Turin, with Emil Tory and Móric Pogány
  - Városmajor Street primary school, Budapest, with Károly Kós
  - Part of the Wekerle housing estate (buildings on the main square), Kispest
  - Hangya office building (the present-day MOL Group's building), Közraktár Street 30, Budapest
- 1920-1930
  - Balaton Museum, Keszthely
  - Deri Museum, Debrecen
  - Hungarian pavilion at the Exhibition in Philadelphia
  - ELMU apartments on Honvéd Street, Budapest
  - Hungarian pavilion at the World Fair in Barcelona
- 1930-1940
  - Hungarian Room, Pittsburgh
  - Apartments on Orom Street, Budapest
  - Houses on St János Square; Nyary Pal Street 10, Budapest
  - Hungarian pavilion at the World Fair in Brussels
  - Office building of the Danuvia factory, Budapest
  - Hungarian pavilion at the Paris Exposition Internationale des Arts et Techniques dans la Vie Moderne
  - ELMU buildings on Attila Street, Budapest
- 1940-1950
  - Primary school on Tomcsányi Street, Budapest
  - Primary school, Balatonalmádi
