= Julia Zsolnay =

Hungarian applied artist and painter

Julia Zsolnay, married Sikorski (15 February 1856 – 2 April 1950) was a Hungarian applied artist and painter in the medium of ceramics who worked for the Zsolnay Ceramic Factory, founded by her father Vilmos in Pécs, in 1868. Along with her older sister Teréz and Ármin Klein, she was the most productive and most important artist of that factory during its rapid development and worldwide success in the late 19th and early 20th centuries.

== Biography ==
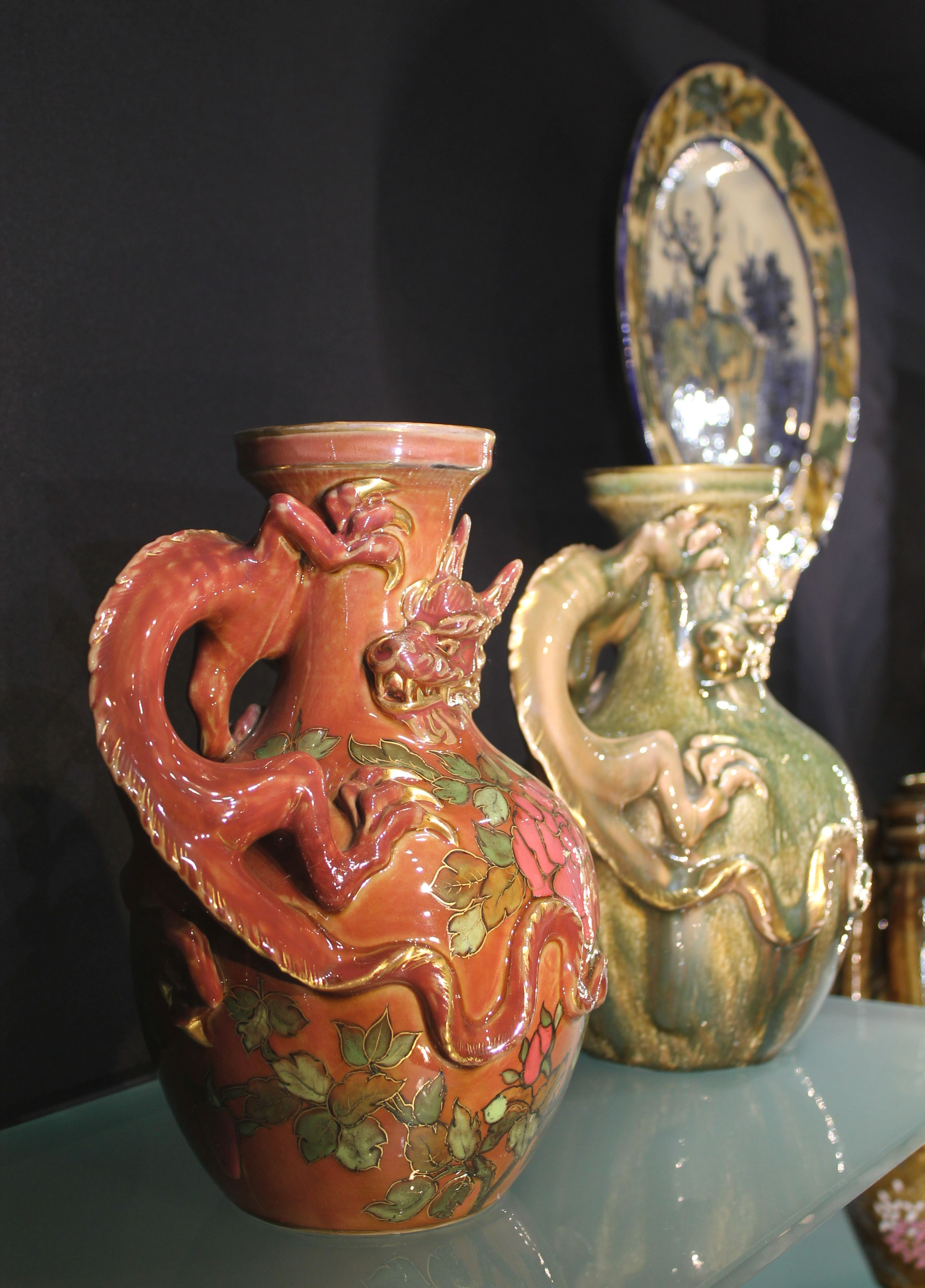
Vases by Julia Zsolnay, 1882, Gyugyi Collection, Pécs

Unlike her sister Teréz, who was mostly inspired by the motifs of folk art, Julia had more extravagant taste and sources that fed her art. Initially, these were Japanese and Turkish-Persian motifs, while her husband Tádé Sikorsky designed even more extravagant vases in the Spanish-Moorish style, as well as perforated double-walled vessels that have Chinese patterns.

After request of her father Vilmos, in 1878 she designed the emblem of the Zsolnay family, with schematic representation of five churches of Pecs, which has been regularly used as a seal of quality ceramics from the family factory ever since.

At the end of the 1880s, Julia's ceramic style reaches its peak in various decorative vessels - jugs with snake-shaped handles, modeled on forms from antiquity.

She closely followed the currents of contemporary fine and applied art, and together with her sister Teréz, she visited then famous painter and applied artist Hans Makart in his Viennese studio.

According to the number of reproductions in the exhibition catalogs and monographs of the Zsolnay Factory, it seems that during the greatest rise of the company, Julia was its most prolific artist.

In her seventies, she rejoined the production of the family factory, decorating large bowls with Japanese and Chinese floral patterns.

Julia was not a traditionalist, and was the first in the family to break away from the family business and devote herself entirely to classical painting, still living in the family home, but no longer working for the factory. She was devoted to painting even after the birth of her children, until her old age.

== Literature ==
- Hars 1989 – Eva Hars: Signature umjetnika i zaštitni znakovi tvornice Zsolnay, in: Keramika Zsolnay, exhibition catalogue, Zagreb, 1989., p. 118-126
- Kovács 1989 - Orsolya Kovács: Ármin Klein, umjetnik - projektant tvornice Zsolnay (1855 - 1883), in: Keramika Zsolnay, exhibition catalogue, Zagreb, 1989., p. 33-37
- Romváry 1989 - Ferenc Romváry: Keramika Zsolnay, in: Keramika Zsolnay, exhibition catalogue, Zagreb, 1989., p. 16-22
- Zsolnay 1989 - Keramika Zsolnay, exhibition catalogue, Zagreb, 1989.
- W.hu/Zsolnay family 2023
