= Anantara New York Palace Budapest Hotel =

Five-star hotel in Budapest, Hungary

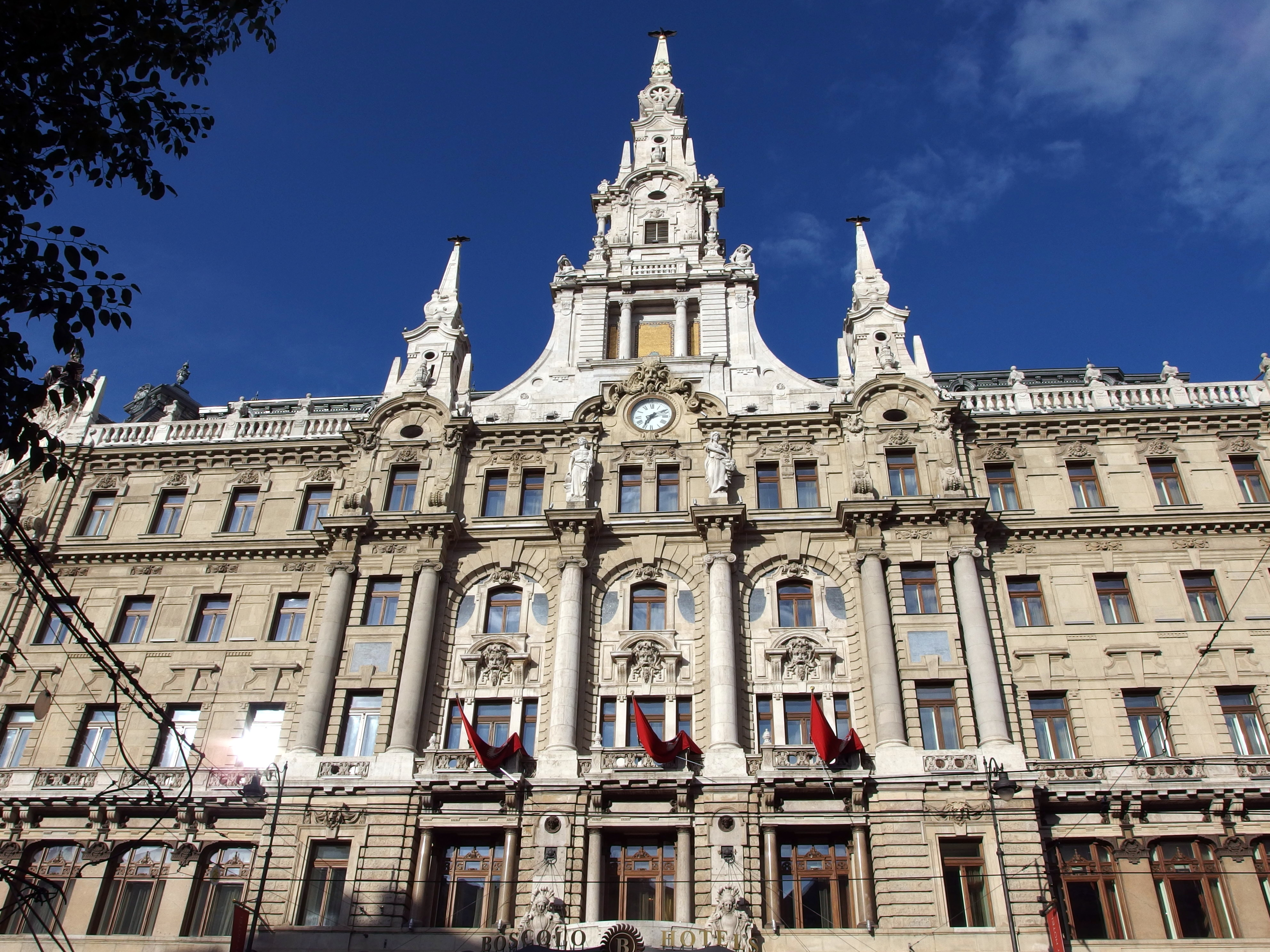
- Interactive map of the Anantara New York Palace Budapest Hotel area
- Hotel chain: Anantara Hotels & Resorts

General information
- Architectural style: Belle Époque
- Location: Erzsébet krt. 9, Budapest, Hungary
- Coordinates: 47.4986°N 19.0705°E
- Opening: 2006; 20 years ago
- Owner: Minor Hotels

Design and construction
- Architects: Alajos Hauszmann, Flóris Korb, and Kálmán Giergl

Other information
- Number of rooms: 185

Website
- anantara.com/en/new-york-palace-budapest

The Anantara New York Palace Budapest Hotel is a five-star luxury hotel located on the Grand Boulevard of Budapest's Erzsébet körút part, under Erzsébet körút 9–11, in the 7th district of Budapest, Hungary. The hotel is part of the Anantara Hotels & Resorts brand under Minor Hotels.

== History ==
The building opened on October 23, 1894, as a local office of the New York Life Insurance Company. It was designed by architect Alajos Hauszmann, along with Flóris Korb and Kálmán Giergl. The famous New York Café (Hungarian: New York Kávéház), located on the ground floor, has been a longtime center for Hungarian literature and poetry. The statues and other ornaments on the facade of the building, as well as the café's 16 imposing devilish fauns, are the works of Károly Senyei.

The building was damaged in World War II, and then nationalized during the communist era. The New York Café was renamed the Hungaria Café in 1954. In 1957, Hungarian sculptors Sándor Boldogfai Farkas, Ödön Metky, and János Sóváry carved replicas in the café of the damaged allegorical sculptures of Thrift and Wealth, America and Hungary. The New York Café was returned to its historic name in 1989, with the fall of communism.

In February 2001, the structure was sold by the Hungarian government to the Italian Boscolo Hotels chain for US$8 million. The building was completely renovated and reopened on May 5, 2006 as the New York Palace - A Boscolo Luxury Hotel, a 107-room luxury hotel, including the restored New York Café. In 2011, the name was shortened to Boscolo Budapest Hotel. In 2017, it joined The Dedica Anthology Hotels as the New York Palace Budapest Hotel.

In January 2020, Covivio, a European investment and development company, acquired the eight hotels under The Dedica Anthology's portfolio, with these hotels subsequently managed by NH Hotel Group.

In 2018, Minor Hotels, the parent company of Anantara Hotels & Resorts, acquired a majority stake in NH Hotel Group. It was renamed as the Anantara New York Palace Budapest Hotel on November 24, 2021.

== Gallery ==
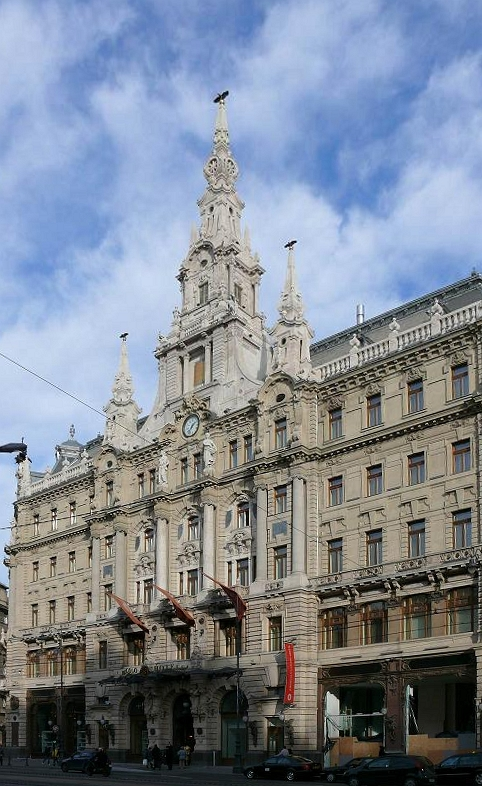
Anantara New York Palace Budapest Hotel

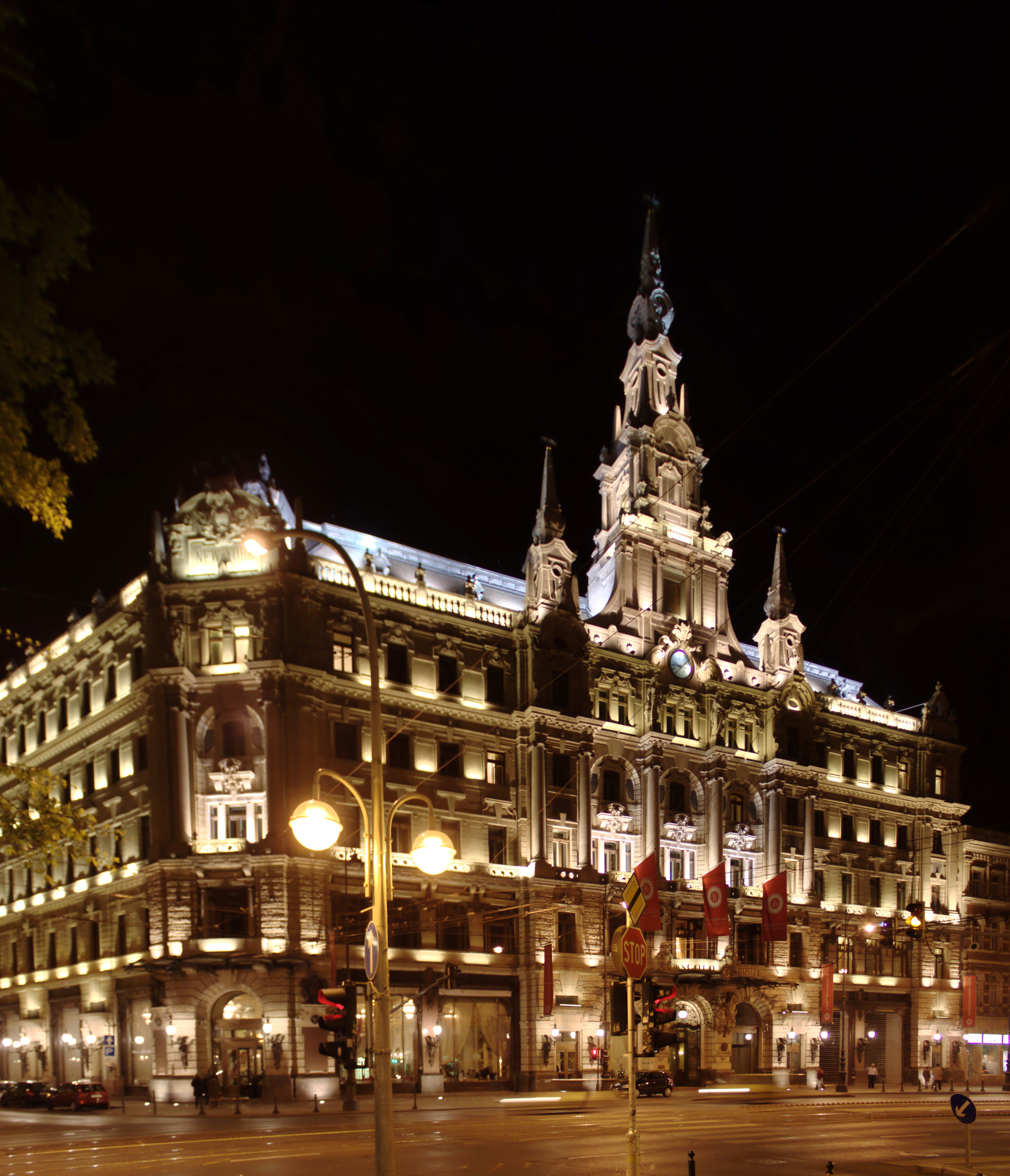
Anantara New York Palace Budapest Hotel at night

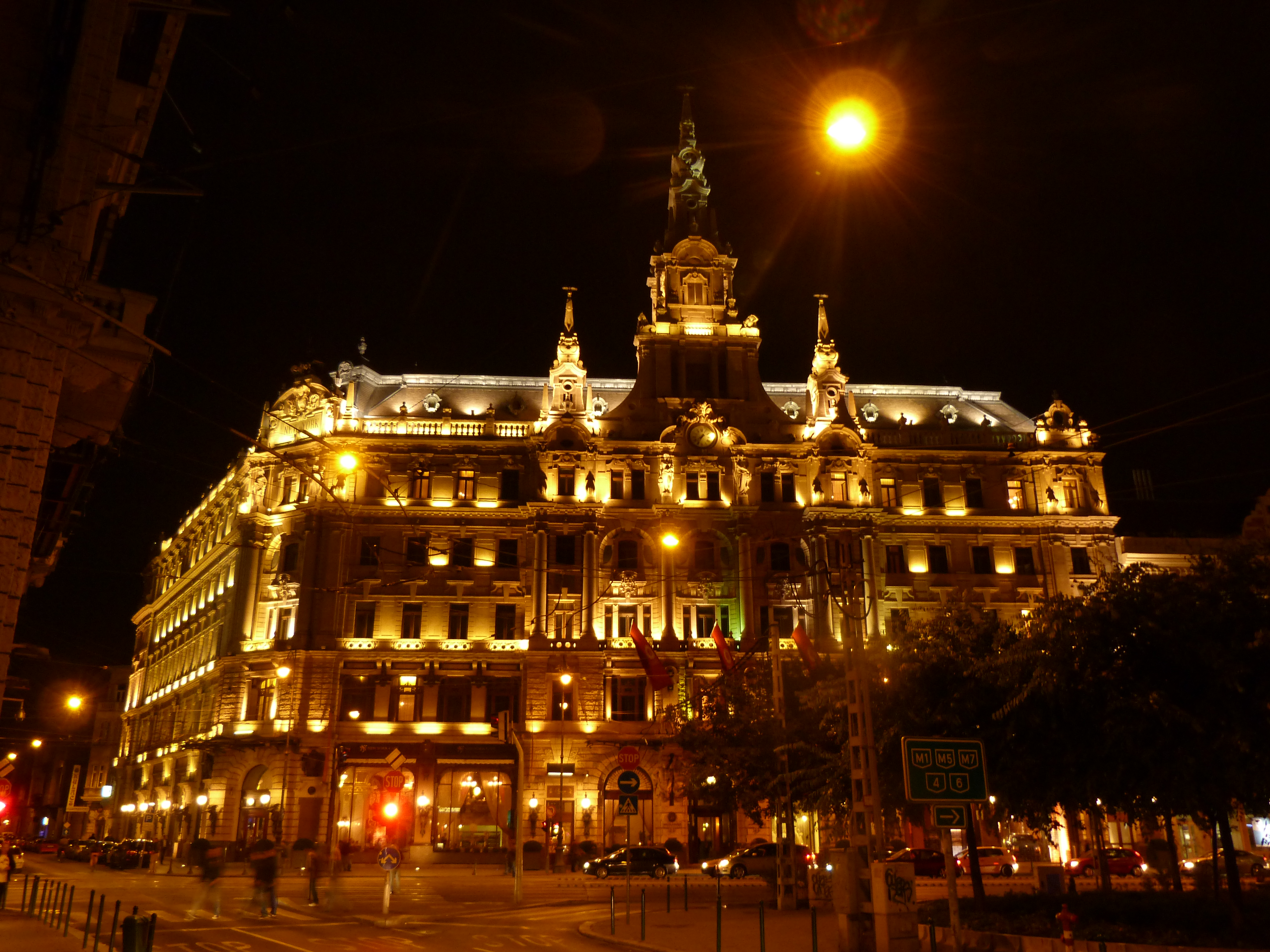
Anantara New York Palace Budapest Hotel

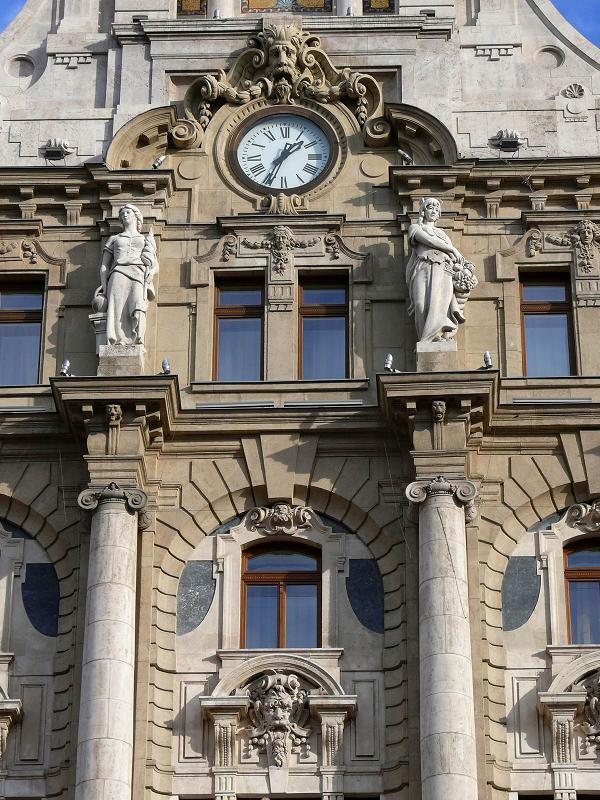
Facade of Anantara New York Palace Budapest Hotel

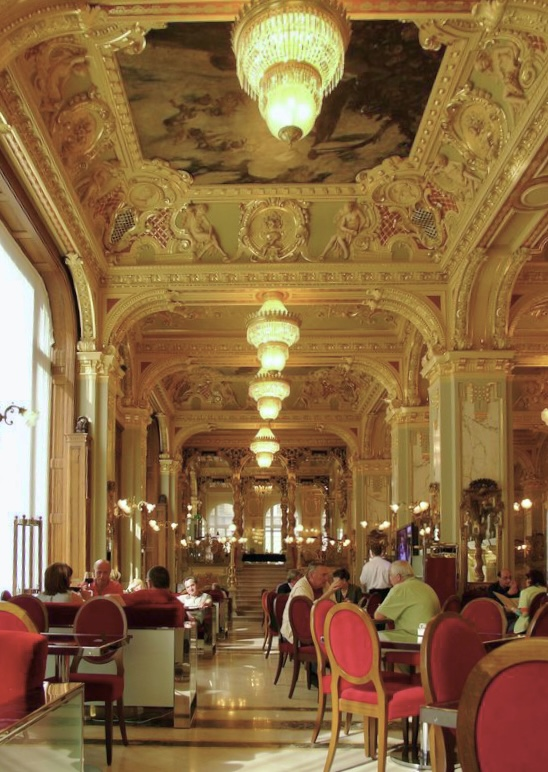
New York Café
