= Philobiblon =

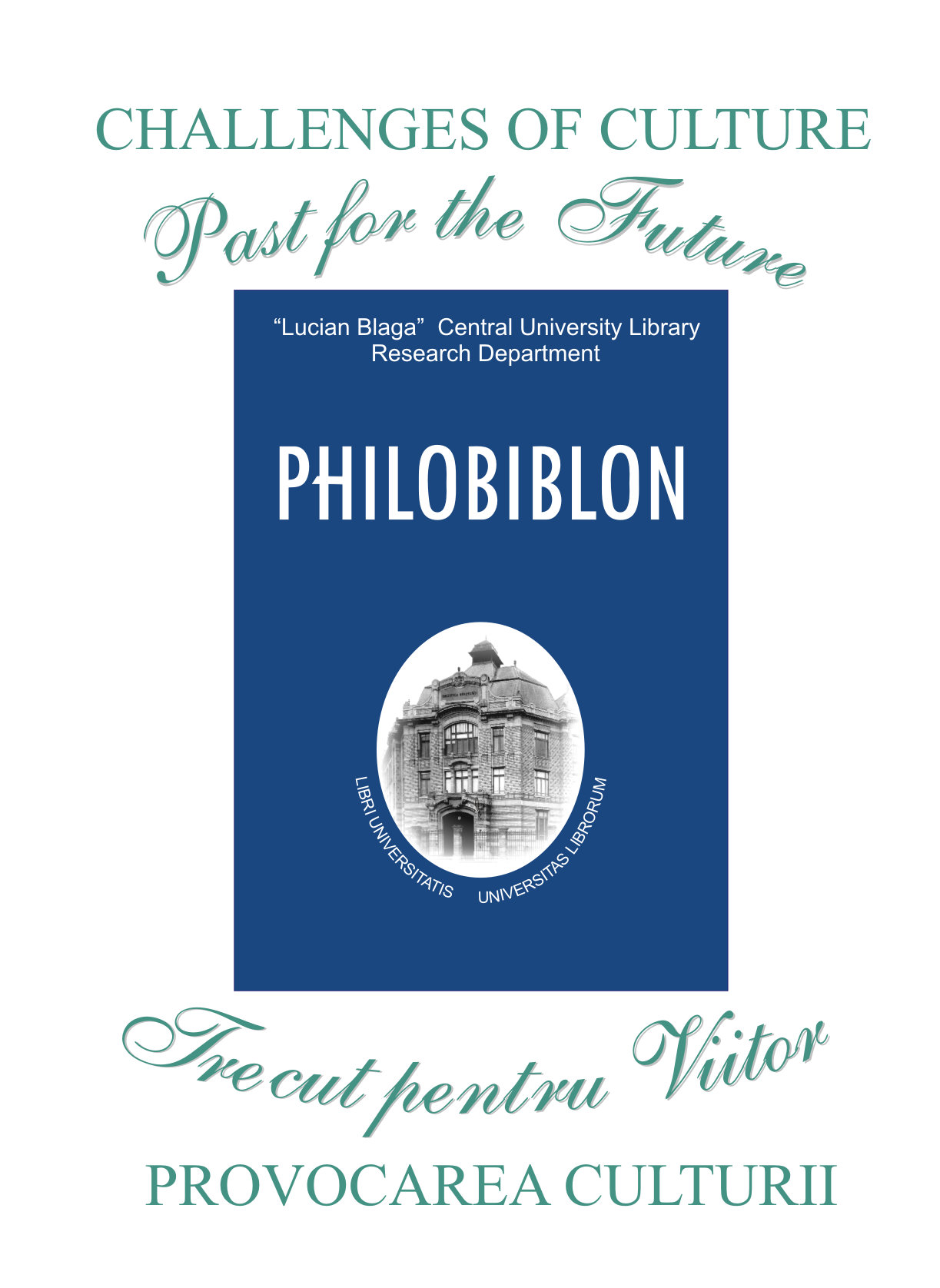
- Discipline: Humanities, social sciences
- Language: English
- Edited by: István Király V.

Publication details
- History: 1996-present
- Publisher: Cluj University Press (Romania)
- Frequency: Biannually

Standard abbreviations
- ISO 4: Philobiblon

Indexing
- ISSN: 1224-7448 (print); 2247-8442 (web)
- LCCN: sn98052041
- OCLC no.: 271188595

Links
- Journal homepage; Online access; Online access

Philobiblon is a biannual peer-reviewed academic journal published by the Central University Library of Cluj-Napoca, Romania, in collaboration with Cluj University Press (Presa Universitară Clujeană). It was established in 1996 as a continuation of an irregular publication entitled Biblioteca și Învățămîntul (Library and Education).

The subtitles and publication frequency of the journal have changed several times: Bulletin of the Lucian Blaga Central University Library (1996−2008), Journal of the Lucian Blaga Central University Library (2009−2010), and currently: Transylvanian Journal of Multidisciplinary Research in Humanities. Until 2011 it was published annually (except for 1996−1997, when it was also published twice a year). The program of the journal has changed, completed over time: see the initial program (1996) and the next (2011)

Philobiblon is available electronically through EBSCO Publishing and ProQuest databases, as well as in print. The journal was ranked in 2011 by the Romanian National Council for Scientific Research in Higher Education in seven Humanities categories as a periodical having serious chances to gain international import: Arts; Philosophy; Architecture; History of Science; Historiography and Theory of History; Romanian Language and Literature; Foreign Languages and Literature.

== Scope ==
Until 2011, issues of the journal were thematic, engaging several areas of academic research in the humanities and social sciences. As of 2011, the journal changed its profile, appearing with two issues per year as an academic journal of multidisciplinary research in humanities, covering research at the confluence of various branches of the humanities and social sciences and promoting the contemporary synergy of sciences (such as, for example, medical humanities).

Selected articles from Philobiblon are translated into Romanian in a series of biannually published anthologies entitled Hermeneutica Bibliothecaria.

== Abstracting and indexing ==
The journal is abstracted and indexed in EBSCO databases, Library, Information Science & Technology Abstracts), ProQuest databases, Scopus, and ERIH PLUS.
