= List of libraries in Romania =

This is a list of libraries in Romania.

== Libraries by region ==
=== Bucharest-Ilfov ===
- Central University Library, Bucharest
- National Library of Romania

=== Center ===
- George Barițiu County Library in Brasov
- Teleki Library, Târgu-Mureș

=== North-East ===
See also: Iași International Festival of Literature and Translation (in Romanian)

- Central University Library of Iași
- G.T. Kirileanu City Library, Vatra Dornei

=== North-West ===
- Central University Library of Cluj-Napoca

=== South-East ===
- Ioan N. Roman County Library in Constanța
- V. A. Urechia Library, Galați, est.1889
- Vasile Voiculescu County Library in Buzău

=== South-Muntenia ===
- Dinicu Golescu Argeș County Library, Pitești
- IA Bassarabescu Giurgiu County Library

=== South-West ===
- Alexandru and Aristia Aman Dolj County Library
- Olt County Library Ion Minulescu, Slatina

=== West ===
- Central Library of Politehnica University of Timișoara
- Eugen Todoran Central University Library, Timișoara
- Sorin Titel County Library, Timișoara

== See also ==
- Access to public information in Romania
- Copyright law of Romania
- List of Romanian-language publishers
- Mass media in Romania
- Romanian literature

in Romanian

- List of city libraries in Romania (in Romanian)
- List of county libraries in Romania (in Romanian)
- List of municipal libraries in Romania (in Romanian)
- List of specialized libraries in Romania (in Romanian)
- List of university libraries in Romania (in Romanian)
- Publishing house (in Romanian)
