= Access to public information in Romania =

Access to public information and freedom of information (FOI) refer to the right of access to information held by public bodies also known as "right to know". Access to public information is considered of fundamental importance for the effective functioning of democratic systems, as it enhances governments' and public officials' accountability, boosting people participation and allowing their informed participation into public life. The fundamental premise of the right of access to public information is that the information held by governmental institutions is in principle public and may be concealed only on the basis of legitimate reasons which should be detailed in the law.

In Romania Access to public information is regulated by the Freedom of Information Act (FOIA), adopted in 2001. The information access principle is enshrined in Article 31 of the Romanian Constitution which provides that people's right of access to any information of public interest shall not be restricted and that public authorities shall be bound to provide correct information to the citizens in public affairs and matters of personal interests. However, despite the existence of a legal framework regulating access to public information and providing rules for its implementation, transparency has yet to take roots in Romanian institutional culture.

== Background ==
In Romania, as in other countries in Central and Eastern Europe, freedom of information laws were not among the first priorities of the new post-Communist regimes after 1989 changes. In such countries, pressure to open archives and secret police records increased, but there was little public pressure to adopt freedom of information laws relating to all categories of public interest information. In Romania, the process of European integration was one of the main political driver for the passage of the Law on Freedom of Information adopted in 2001, two years after Romania was accepted as a European Union candidate country. However, the EU transformative potential was weakened by the lack of proper implementation. Domestic statutes transposing EU directives mandating for public access to information were riddled with multiple exemptions that Romanian authorities largely exploited.

The Law was the result of a consultation process which is considered a best practice in terms of civil society's cooperation with political actors. Implementing rules of this law, approved by the Government in 2002, laid down the applicable principles, procedures and norms for the application of the law and for guaranteeing the right of free access to public information as well as the sanctions in case of infringement. The law also regulates proactive disclosure, meaning the proactive publication of relevant information without a prior specific FOI request.

== Legal Framework ==
Freedom of information in Romania is regulated by a framework law on free access to public information (2001) and by a set of regulations. Other relevant laws concern classified information (2002), transparency in decision-making (2003), transparency in public office, in commercial transactions and in debts of the state (2003). Also, for public access to environmental information, a special Governmental Decision was adopted in 2005, applying the Aarhus Convention.

=== The Law on free access to public information ===
According to the law on free access to public information, all persons - natural or legal, Romanian or foreign - are entitled to ask for and receive public information.

The law applies to all public institutions (central and local), as well as to public companies where the state is a majority shareholder. All information held by these entities is considered public unless it is duly classified or related to personal data.

The Romanian FOIA exempts from access any information regarding personal data as well as classified information on national defence, public order, deliberations of public authorities, and national economic and political interests. In addition to these traditional kind of exempted information, commercial information is also exempted from access if its disclosure would breach intellectual property rights and the principle of fair competition. Information on the judicial process is another sensitive area on FOIA's exemptions: in principle, information regarding criminal or disciplinary investigation is generally not public due to its confidential character, but, according to the European Court of Human Rights, information must be provided to the public about high-profile cases, i.e. those involving high-level corruption and organised crime.

==== Procedures for Access ====
Information requests may be submitted in writing (both electronically and on paper) and orally. The public information officer performs a first check on the requested information in order to decide if it can be disclosed or it falls within one of the exceptions. Officers also check if their respective institution holds the information; if not, the public information officer forwards the request to the body that may have it.

The law establishes strict deadlines for providing the requested information: 5 days from the submission of the request if access is denied; 10 days from the submission of the request if access is granted; 30 days from the submission of the request if access is granted and the compilation of the answer is complex and time consuming.

Accessing public information is free of charge. Fees can only be charged for covering costs for copying and reproducing the documents required.

==== Right to appeal ====
The process for appealing an administrative decision on FOI requests has two phases: the first is ad administrative complaint filed to the respective agency; the second is to the courts. The first procedure also covers administrative silence, meaning when no answer is provided within the legal time frame. As for appeals to the courts, enforcement of the FOIA has widely relied on the judicial system and on precedents by courts sanctions.

== The role of Romanian civil society in enforcing the FOI law ==
In Romania, the activism of civil society actors in enforcing the law and exploiting its possibilities has been remarkable. The media and civil society organisations embraced the FOI law in order to create practices and monitoring tools, sometimes using institutional support for consolidating good practices or more confrontational approaches, such as suing state bodies on the FOIA to test the scope of the law's applicability and creating legal precedents. Some NGOs have been particularly active: for instance, the Center for Independent Journalism - which organised a series of workshops and trainings for journalists on how to use FOIA - or the Institute for Public Policy - which organised programmes for monitoring the activities and expenditures of MPs and councilors.

== Access to public information in practice ==
According to some experts, the Romanian freedom of information law gives discretionary powers to public authorities which do not use them properly. Another shortcoming concerns the provisions enacted by another law, the law on classified information, that gives the head of the public institution the right to decide if some information is confidential, without establishing any control mechanism over this decision.

In 2003 the Pro Democracy Association published a report after having monitored for a year the way in which Romanian authorities applied the law. One of the main findings of the study was that the number of FOI requests was quite low, because of a lack of knowledge among citizens and companies of this right and the relevant law. The conclusion of the report was that the secretive mentality of public officials, the lack of institutional management and the poor knowledge of the regulations regarding the application of freedom of information, impeded the proper implementation of the 2001 law on access to public information.

According to some journalists that made use of the law to request access to public information, there are several ways for circumventing the law. In some cases, these ways seem to be well established 'modus operandi' by public bodies that exploit the citizens' lack of knowledge of their right under the FOI law.

== See also ==
- Access to public information in Europe
- Freedom of information
- Freedom of information laws by country
- List of libraries in Romania
- Transparency of media ownership in Europe
- Media of Romania
- Transparency of media ownership in Romania
