= Albert Kálmán Kőrössy =

Hungarian architect (1869–1955)

- Born: 18 June 1869; Szeged, Austria-Hungary
- Died: 21 April 1955 (aged 85); Budapest, Hungary
- Occupation: Architect
- Buildings: Kőrössy Villa; Kölcsey Ferenc Gimnázium; Palace of the Hungarian Agricultural and Means Bank Limited Liability Company; Tündérpalota; Decebal Bridge

Albert Kálmán Kőrössy (18 June 1869 – 21 April 1955), known as Albert Neumann until 1891, was a Hungarian architect of Jewish heritage. He was one of the more prominent Hungarian practitioners of the Szecesszió (Art Nouveau) style in Hungary between the 1890s and 1914.

== Life and career ==
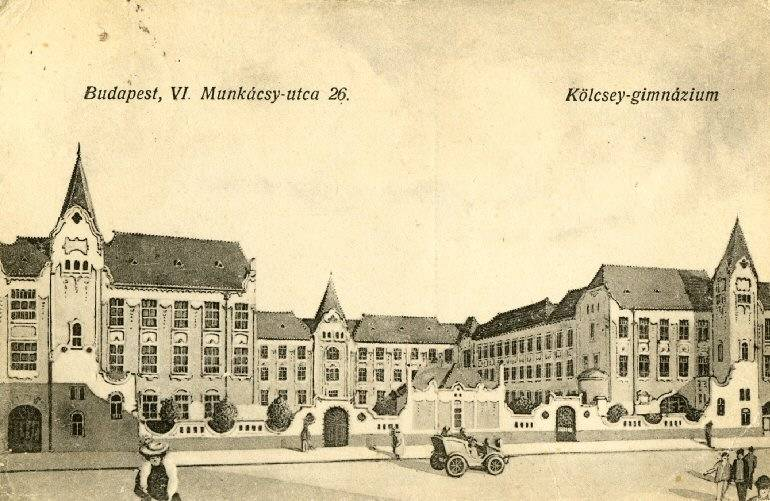
Kölcsey Ferenc Gimnázium, Budapest (1906-09).

Albert Neumann was born into a wealthy Jewish family in Szeged, south of Budapest. His father, Miksa Neumann (1837–1912), was the vice-president of the Budapest Commodity and Stock Exchange and was a member of the Chevra Kadisa in Pest for decades, and his mother was Júlia Heiduschka. In 1891, he converted to Catholicism and thus was fully "Hungarianized." Albert Kőrössy matriculated to the Royal Joseph Polytechnic University in Budapest (now the Budapest University of Technology and Economics), and then went on to the École des Beaux Arts in Paris, then arguably the most prestigious architectural school in the world. He later studied at the Königliche Bauakademie in Berlin, and eventually made his way to Munich, where he received his degree in architecture as a student of the famous German Baroque Revival architect Friedrich von Thiersch.

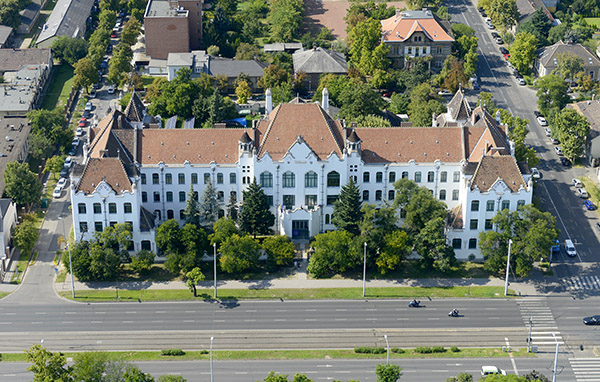
Tündérpalota, or the former Civil Service State High School, Budapest (1909-11).

During his years abroad, Kőrössy was introduced to the embryonic forms of Art Nouveau in France and its counterpart, Jugendstil, in Germany. Upon his return to Hungary, he got a job in the office of Alajos Hauszmann, then one of the most respected architects in Budapest. There, he met the young designer Artúr Sebestyén, and the two became friends. In 1895, the pair decided to start their own firm, a partnership which lasted for four years. During this time their main commissions consisted of Baroque-revival tenements and apartment houses, which were quickly becoming some of the most popular residential types in Budapest. A notable exception was the Osztálysorsjáték palotát (Palace of the Royal Hungarian Lottery) on Eskü (now Március 15.) tér [15 March Square] (1898–99), which was severely damaged in World War II and subsequently demolished.

Kőrössy split from Sebestyén in 1899 and built his own house at Városligeti fasor 47 in Budapest, which was heavily influenced by Belgian, French and German Art Nouveau/Jugendstil. Having become proficient in the vocabulary of the style just when it was reaching its apogee elsewhere in Europe, he became a much-sought after designer in Hungary, helping to develop the Szecesszió into a kind of national style alongside many other architects, chief among them Ödön Lechner, who was nearly 25 years his senior. He was known for many residential commissions in Budapest, amongst them the Walko House at Aulich utca 3 (1901); the Sonnenberg twin apartment houses at Alkotás utca 5-7 (1904–05); the Gonda House at Práter utca 9 (1904–05); and the Sonnenberg House at Munkácsy Mihály utca 23 (1904). The latter was a few steps away from the grammar school at Munkácsy Mihály utca 26, now the Kölcsey Ferenc High School (1906–09), one of several schools that Kőrössy designed. Others included the Roman Catholic grammar school (now Unirea Liceum) in Marosvásárhely (now Târgu Mureş, Romania; 1903), and the Royal Hungarian State High School in Budapest, often called the Tündérpalota (Fairy Palace; 1909–11), now the National Pedagogical Library and Museum. In this building one can see the influence of Károly Kós and the Szecesszió architects interested in folk and vernacular themes and handcraft.

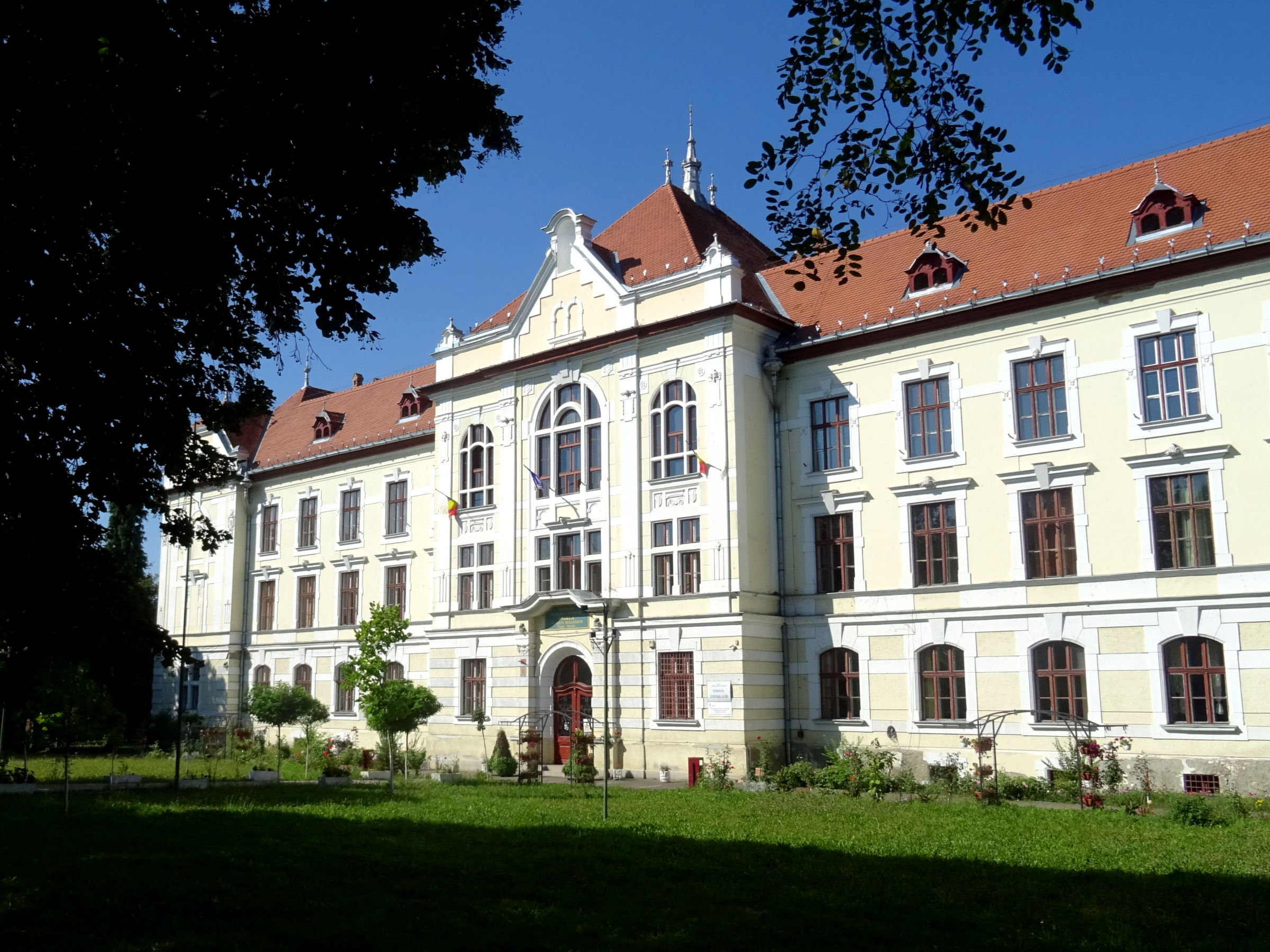
Unirea Liceum in Târgu Mureş (1903).

Kőrössy also undertook several other notable large-scale commissions. In 1909 he formed a partnership with Geza Kiss, and together they completed three major buildings for financial institutions, most significantly the Palace of the Hungarian Agricultural and Means Bank Limited Liability Company on Nador utca (1912). With Michailich Győző, he also designed the Decebal Bridge, a reinforced concrete structure over the Bega River in Temesvár (now Timișoara, Romania) in 1908, which at the time was the longest of its type in the world.

With the outbreak of World War I in 1914, nearly all building activity in Budapest ceased. During the conflict Kőrössy designed an army barracks and worked as a law enforcement officer. After the war, he effectively retired, although his name is sometimes mentioned in conjunction with the work of the Hungarian Ministry of Reconstruction from the 1920s.

== Personal life ==
He married Dóra Paula Román, daughter of Károly Rosenberg and Ilka Märle, on 10 April 1902 in Terezváros, Budapest. They divorced in 1930. Kőrössy sold his villa in 1948 with nationalization of property imminent.

== Principal works ==
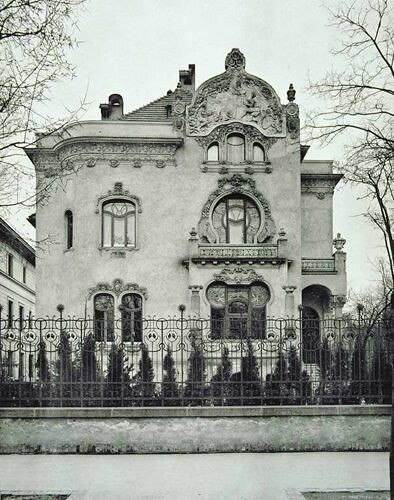
Kőrössy House, Budapest (1899–1900), 1904 photo.

- 1898–99: Budapest V., Eskü tér 6. Palace of the Royal Hungarian Lottery – with Artúr Sebestyén
- 1899–1900: Budapest VII., Városligeti utca 47. Kőrössy Villa – with Artúr Sebestyén
- 1901: Budapest V., Aulich utca 3. Walko House
- 1904: Budapest VI., Munkácsy Mihály u. 23. Sonnenberg House
- 1904–05: Budapest VIII., Práter utca 9. Gonda House
- 1905: Budapest XII., Alkotás utca 5–7. Sonnenberg twin house
- 1906–09: Budapest VI., Munkácsy Mihály utca 26. Main grammar school, today: Kölcsey Ferenc Gimnázium
- 1907: Budapest II., Török utca 8. Bíró House
- 1908: Timișoara, Decebal Bridge, with Michailich Győző
- 1909–11: Budapest VIII., Könyves Kálmán körút 40. Civil Service State High School, often called the Tündérpalota
- 1912: Budapest V., Kristóf tér 6. residential building
- 1912: Budapest V., Budapest, Nádor u. 16. Palace of the Hungarian Agricultural and Means Bank Limited Liability Company – together with Géza Kiss
- 1912–13: Budapest VI., Benczúr utca 26. Dayka Villa
