= Central Library of Politehnica University of Timișoara =

Library in Timișoara, Romania

Central Library of Politehnica University
- Biblioteca Centrală a Universității Politehnica
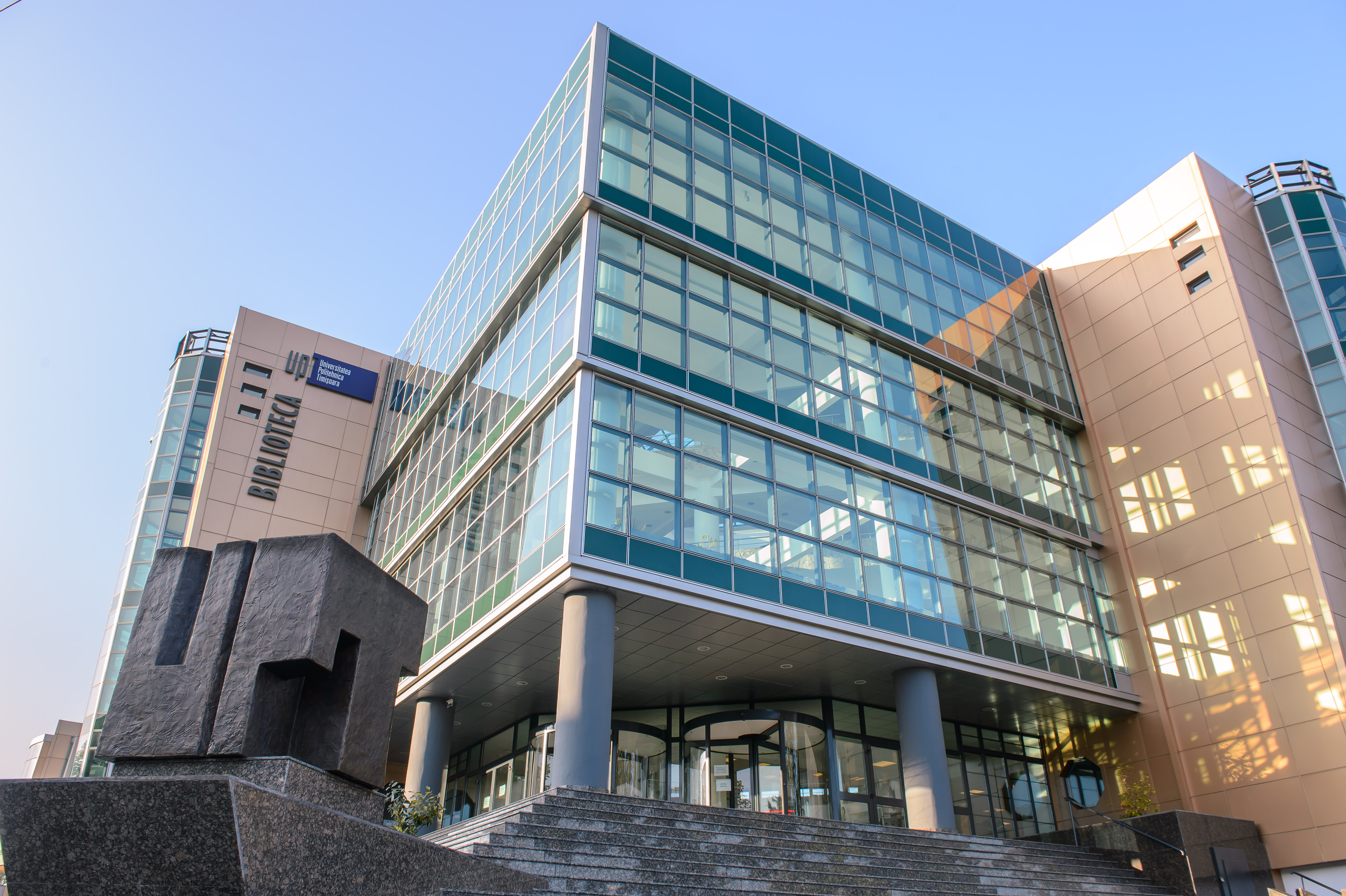
- 45°44′49″N 21°13′43″E
- Location: 2B Vasile Pârvan Boulevard, Timișoara
- Type: Academic library
- Established: 1920

Collection
- Size: 700,000 volumes

Other information
- Director: Florin Bodin
- Parent organization: Politehnica University of Timișoara
- Website: library.upt.ro

The Central Library of Politehnica University is the library of the Politehnica University of Timișoara. Between 1947 and 2014 it functioned in the Piarist High School ensemble.

== History ==
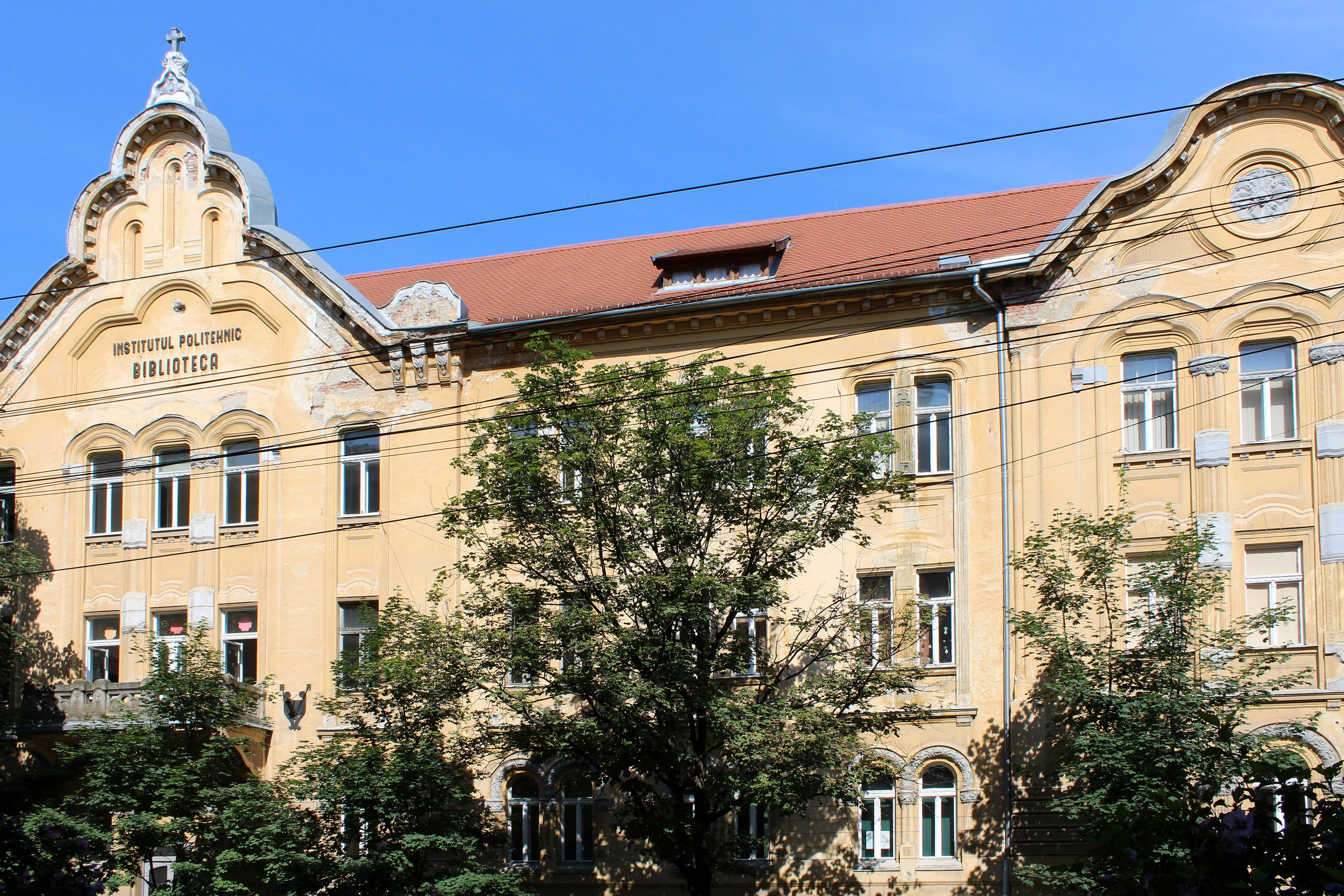
The old headquarters of the library at the Piarist High School

The library was established with the Polytechnic Institute by royal decree in 1920. The activity of the library was started in the building of the primary school on Carol Telbisz Street, where it was active until 1947, when its collections were moved to the headquarters on Piatra Craiului Street.

The first librarian mentioned in the institute's yearbooks was Eustațiu Pandele. On 15 March 1921, he registered the first book in the library's patrimony: Béton armé. Abaques pratiques pour l'établissement des hourdis et des poteaux, a French-language work published by M. Corset, a French engineer, in Paris in 1920. After only one year, in which he worked alone, followed a period of 16 years in which, in addition to the librarian, there is also mentioned a room warden, which demonstrates the increase in the number of publications and the number of readers. The activity of the library continued in all the past years, parallel to the activity of the institute, it being the one that provided the material support of the students' training and of the research activity.

Because it was located in the center of Timișoara, but far from some faculties, the library had specialized branches at the faculties of Chemistry, Electro, Mechanics and Construction. Following the retrocession of the Piarist ensemble to the Catholic Church, a new headquarters was built for the library on Vasile Pârvan Boulevard, near the mentioned faculties, so that the branches were merged there. Construction work on the new building took eight years and cost about 16 million euros. The last 100 books were symbolically moved to the new location on 12 November 2014 by a human chain of 1,000 students.

== Collections ==
The library contains about 700,000 volumes to which students of other universities in Timișoara also have access. The book fund mainly includes documents from technical fields, but also from other spheres of knowledge, being intended exclusively for loan.

The collection of descriptions of inventions includes approximately 61,300 documents from all fields of activity. The library offers users a rich collection of Romanian and foreign periodicals. The collection of periodicals includes representative documents that have appeared over the years, especially in areas that cover technical disciplines. The first foreign periodical to be part of the Central Library's fund is Berichte der deutschen chemischen Gesellschaft, published in Berlin in 1868. The oldest Romanian magazine kept in the library's collection, since its first issue, is Gazeta matematică and dates from 1897.

== See also ==
- List of libraries in Romania
