= Ármin Klein =

Hungarian painter and sculptor (1855–1883)

Ármin Klein (1855 – 1883) was a Hungarian painter, sculptor and applied artist in the medium of ceramics, who created almost his entire artistic oeuvre for the Zsolnay Ceramics Factory in Pécs. Along with the owner's daughter, sister Teréz and Julia Zsolnay, he was the most important artist of that factory during its fast development and worldwide success at the end of the 19th century.

== Early life and education ==
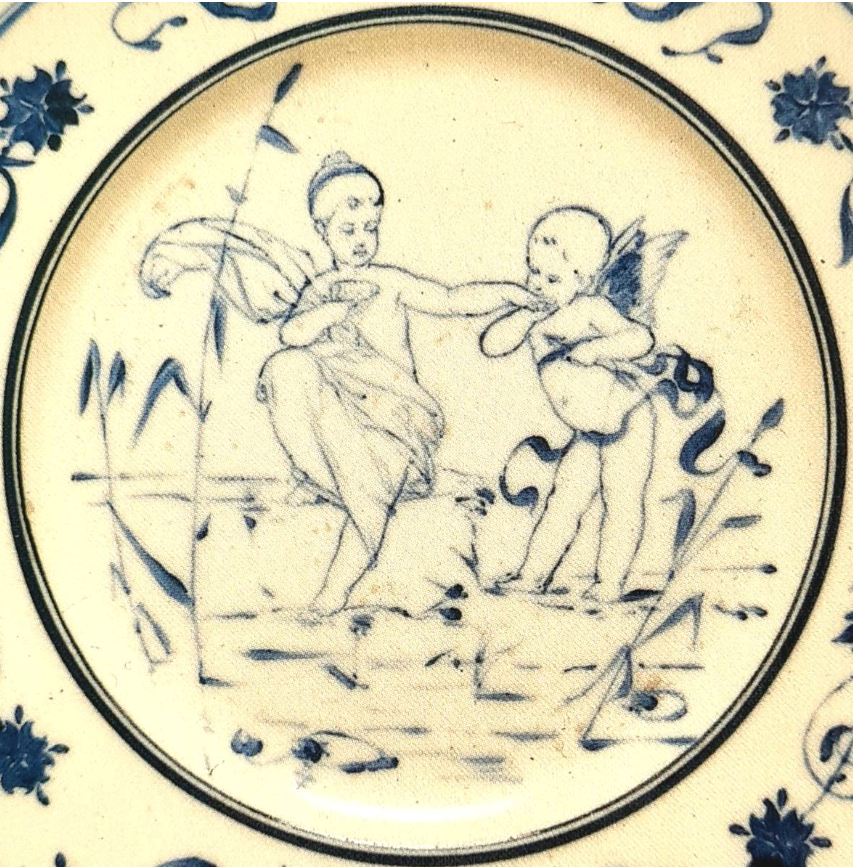
Armin Klein: Plate with amoretti, 1879.

He was born in 1855 in Veszprém, in a Jewish family.

He studied sculpture at the University of Applied Arts in Vienna and at the suggestion of his professors he went to Pécs.

== Career ==
With his arrival, Klein introduced a new spirit to the previous production of Zsolnay ceramics, which at that time was based mainly on oriental (Chinese and Japanese), and Persian and Turkish ornamentation, as well as on the ornamentation of domestic Hungarian folk art.

Klein, however, brought breath of European art of that time, and especially in the German cultural circle of then-popular style of historicism, specifically: Neo-Renaissance.

However, in Klein's expression there was no trace of the pedantry of German historicism and the copying of templates. Although he was a sculptor by training, he was also quite skilled in drawing, which was decorative and lyrical at the same time. This is especially shown in his Amoretti series from 1878 and 1879. Typical for this series are plates with a rim divided by a stripe and decorated with a Renaissance ornament on the rim, while in the recipient are drawn amoretti in pairs, shown in genre scenes. All this was done in cobalt sepia. The amoretti motif was especially popularized by Hans Makart, a popular Viennese painter at the time, whom Teréz and Julia Zsolnay visited in his Viennese atelier, and Klein even made a female portrait in his style. Klein also painted other types of vessels, so, for example, he painted flasks with scenes from folk life. There are several of his flasks with depictions of the wedding party.

Although he was much less productive in sculpture, it is certainly worth mentioning his depictions of famous scientists (Leonardo da Vinci, Newton, Watt...) for the Polytechnic in Budapest. These circular, colored ceramic reliefs, were later also installed in the Apprentice School in Pécs.

Klein's creativity essentially shaped the artistic production of the Zsolnay Factory. In accordance with the artistic currents of his time, he united the ideas and styles of large centers with local features, and despite his early death at the age of 28, he left an indelible mark on the Austro-Hungarian ceramic art of his time.

== Literature ==
- Kovács 1989 - Orsolya Kovács: Ármin Klein, umjetnik - projektant tvornice Zsolnay (1855 - 1883), in: Keramika Zsolnay, exhibition catalogue, Zagreb, 1989., p. 33–37
- Romváry 1989 - Ferenc Romváry: Keramika Zsolnay, in: Keramika Zsolnay, exhibition catalogue, Zagreb, 1989., p. 16–22
- Sorić 1989 – Ante Sorić: Uvod, in: Keramika Zsolnay, exhibition catalogue, Zagreb, 1989., p. 7
