= Central University Library of Iași =

- Biblioteca Centrală Universitară "Mihai Eminescu" Iași
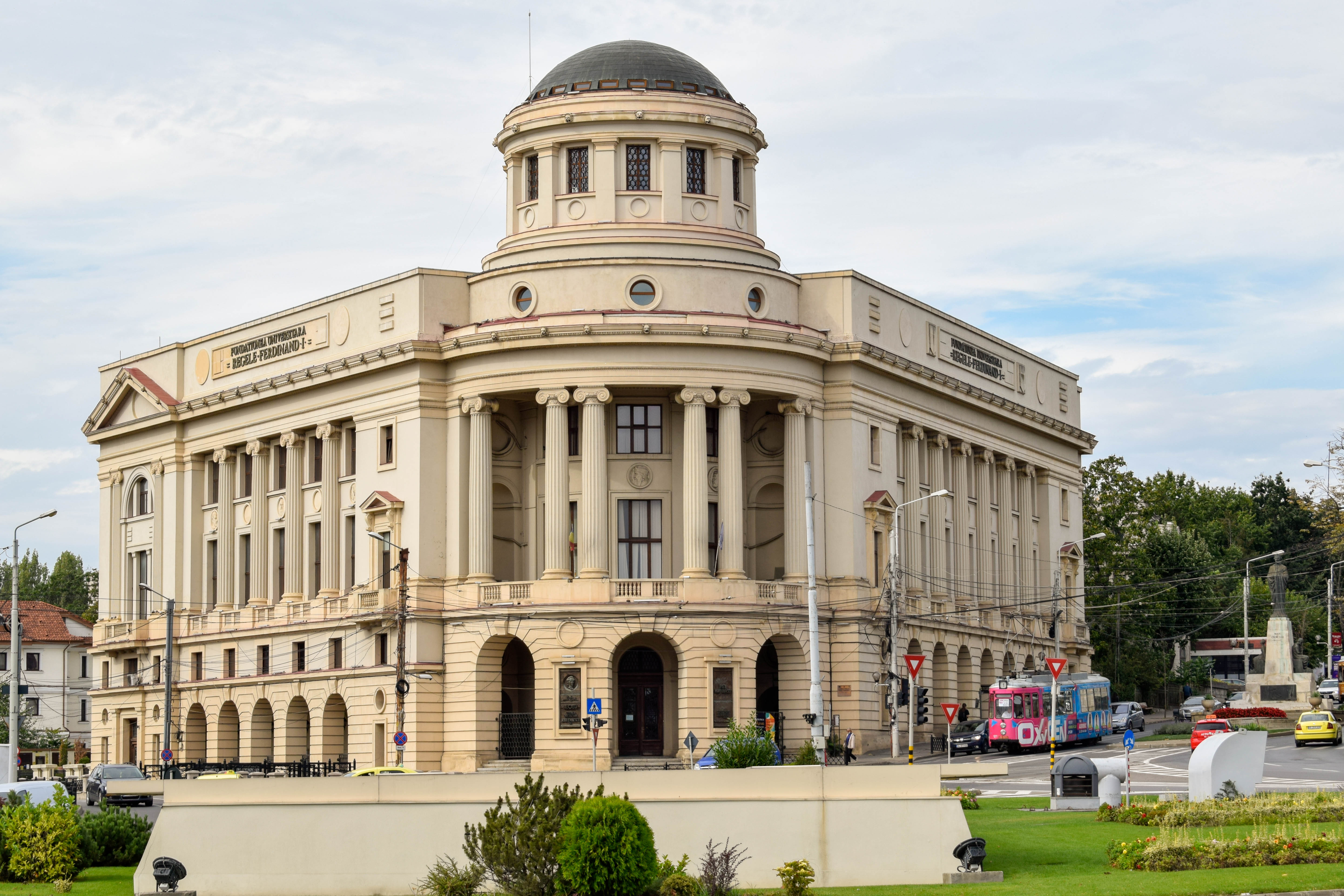
- The main branch of the Mihai Eminescu Central University Library
- 47.1702°N 27.5756°E
- Location: Iași, Romania
- Type: Academic library
- Established: 1839
- Branches: 13

Collection
- Size: over 2.5 million

Other information
- Website: www.bcu-iasi.ro

Building details

General information
- Architectural style: Neoclassical
- Construction started: 1930
- Inaugurated: 1934

Design and construction
- Architect: Constantin Iotzu
- Engineer: Emil Prager

The Mihai Eminescu Central University Library of Iași (Romanian: Biblioteca Centrală Universitară "Mihai Eminescu" Iași) is a library that serves the Alexandru Ioan Cuza University and the entire university and academic community in Iași, Romania.

== History ==
The library was established on 8 November 1839 and opened on 23 November 1841, carrying on the tradition of the activity and fame of the old library of Academia Vasiliană, founded in 1640. Functioning closely with Academia Mihăileană, founded in 1835, it had the double character of a school library and a public library. In 1860, when the academy was transformed into the new University of Iași, the library became the Central University Library of Iași. However, its university character was soon changed again, for in 1864 the Regulation for Public Libraries transformed it into the Central State Library of Iași, with a national library profile but also playing the role of a university library. This double character continued until 1916, when the library once again assumed its current name.

When it opened, the University of Iași had three faculties, not counting the theological section: Law, Philosophy, and Science. Scientific and technical specialisation of the different sections within the faculties began almost at once. After several management proposals made by Dimitrie Gusti in 1913 and 1914, the library was reorganised in 1932 according to the system proposed by B. Harms and W. Gülich. It was once again reorganised in 1948, after World War II. This had become quite necessary, as the library's collection had increased from 600 volumes to 1,500,000. By 2007 it had an additional million volumes. Among these are manuscripts, incunabula and rare books that entered the collection from monastic and private libraries, either by donation or purchase.

Mihai Eminescu and Bogdan Petriceicu Hasdeu both served as librarians-in-chief at this institution.

From its foundation until 1860, the library functioned in the building of Academia Mihăileană (now demolished). It was housed in the old university building (now the University of Medicine and Pharmacy) until 1897 and in the new university building (now the study hall of the Gheorghe Asachi Technical University of Iași) until after World War II, when it moved into the building of the King Ferdinand I Foundation's Library, the collections of which it now includes.

This structure was built between 1930 and 1934 by the engineer Emil Prager following architect Constantin Iotzu's plans. The interior features Carrara marble and Venetian mosaic, while the exterior is decorated with Ionic columns, neo-Doric pilasters, small triangular pediments and medallions of important cultural figures. The building is listed in the National Register of Historic Monuments.

== See also ==
- List of libraries in Romania
