= Central University Library of Cluj-Napoca =

Coordinates: 46°46′01″N 23°35′06″E

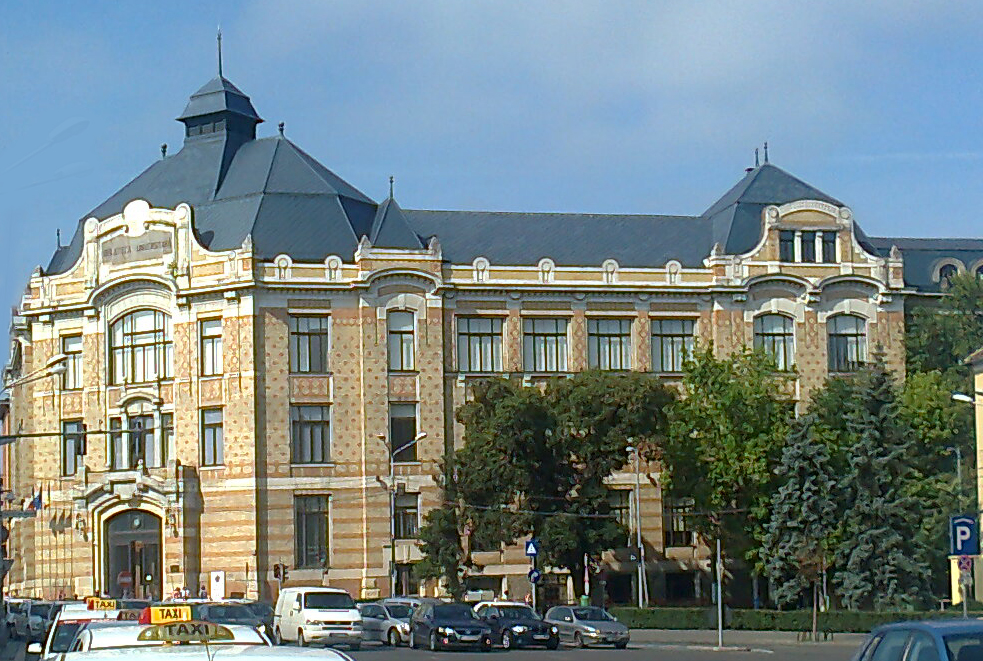
Central University Library of Cluj-Napoca.

The Lucian Blaga Central University Library of Cluj-Napoca (Romanian: Biblioteca Centrală Universitară "Lucian Blaga" din Cluj-Napoca) serves Babeș-Bolyai University in Romania.

== History ==
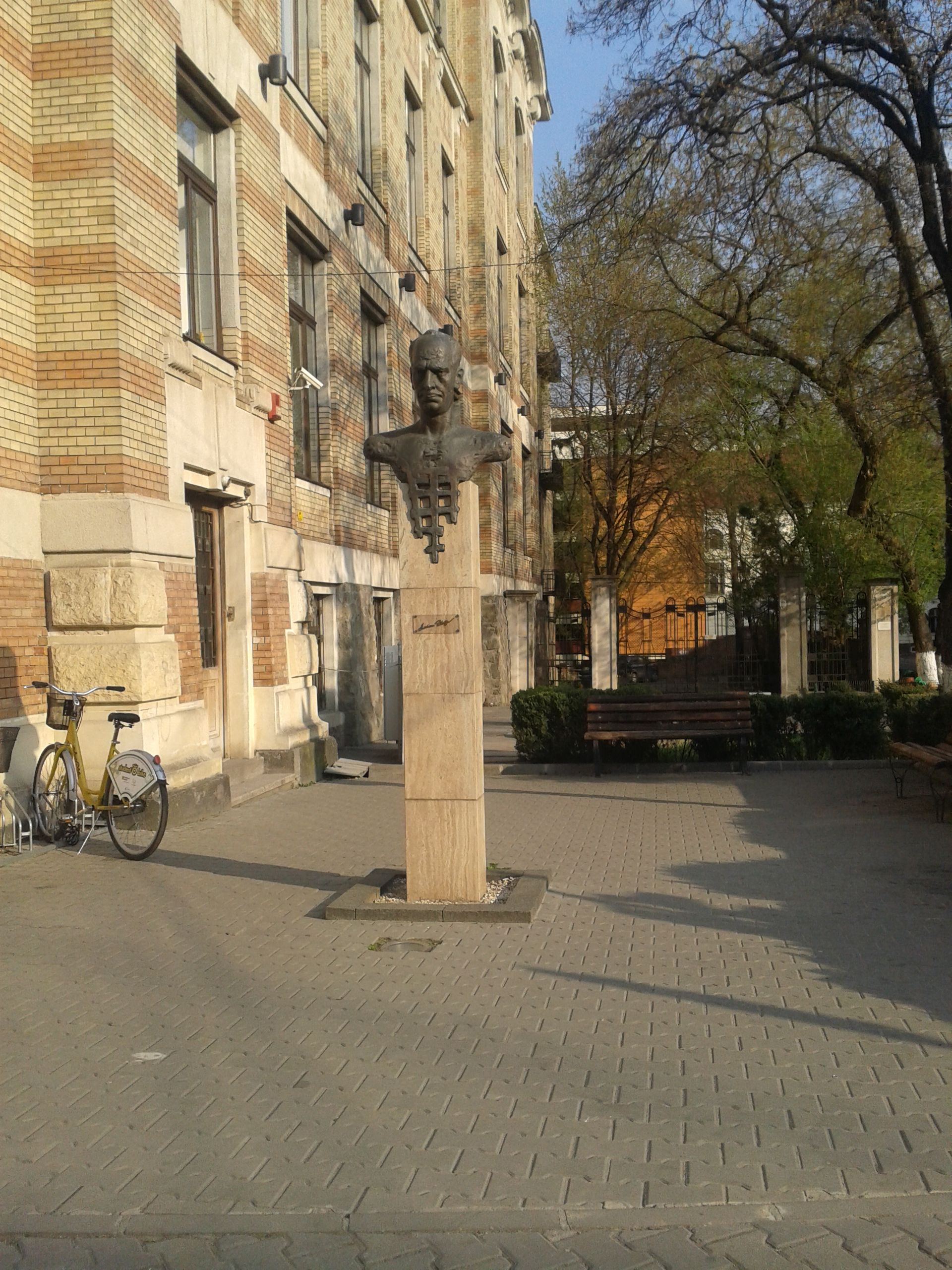
Bust of Lucian Blaga in front of the Library

The library was founded in 1872, at the same time as Franz Joseph University, which was eventually supplanted by Babeș-Bolyai University. Its initial stock, about 18,000 volumes, was made up by gathering the collections received from the Law Academy of Sibiu, the Medical School and Government Archives of Cluj, and those of Iosif Benigni's rich private collections. In 1873/74 the Transylvanian Museum was transferred to the Central University Library. Its library had been founded in 1859, as the Library of the Society of the Transylvanian Museum, on the basis of donations and grants from Metropolitan Bishops Andrei Șaguna and Alexandru Sterca-Șuluțiu and Count Imre Mikó. In 1860 the Library of the Transylvanian Museum was declared "public" and open for the use of citizens, but in 1873/74 it was transferred to the university, being moved to a location near the Central University Library. Although housed in the same building, these two large libraries grew independently of each other for about half a century.

After World War I, when Austria-Hungary broke up and Transylvania (including Cluj) joined Romania, a Romanian university was founded in 1920; it used the existing Central University Library (dedicated in the presence of the royal family and renamed the Library of King Ferdinand I University) and the Library of the Transylvanian Museum, still separate institutions. (They merged in 1948, following World War II.) The new university was endowed with legal deposit copies and was supported by permanent state grants. Many Romanian institutions (the Romanian Academy, the Education Department, the University of Bucharest) contributed to the rapid development of the Central University Library of Cluj; the Romanian Academy Library endowed it with Romanian publications. The first University Report, issued 10 October 1920, mentioned only the "solemn promises" of the Romanian Academy, but the Report of the 1921/22 school year reported a donation of about 30,000 volumes, most of them offered as gifts by the Romanian Academy Library. On 26 September 1923, another collection of some 4,000 volumes was transferred from the Romanian Academy.

The same specialisation process of both faculty sections and library branches took place within the University of Cluj (which finally became Babeș-Bolyai University in 1959 after a series of institutional changes) as with those at the University of Bucharest and the University of Iași. The collections of the library and its specialised network reached 580,000 volumes in 1938; after World War II it was second only to the two National Libraries, with over 2,000,000 volumes of books and periodicals, reaching 3,600,000 by 2002. Among the library's special collections (set up as a distinct department in 1923, after a collection from the Moldavian boyar Gheorghe Sion was received) are items handed down from the Transylvanian Museum collection, maps, engravings, postcards and rare books, including the incunabulum Codex Iustinianus, printed at Nuremberg in 1475, and the set of Gospels printed by Deacon Coresi at Brașov in 1561.

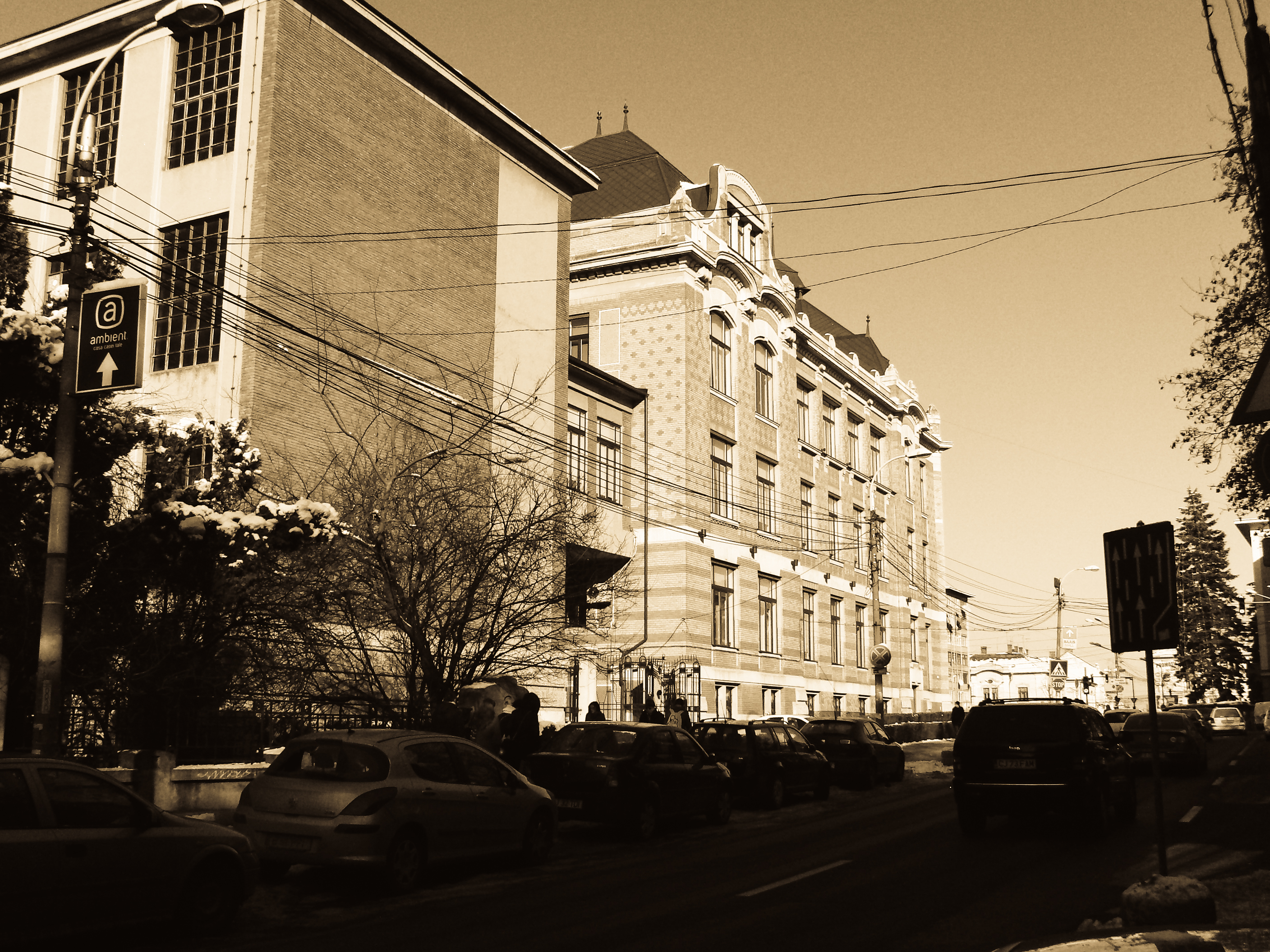
The library viewed from a side street

From its founding until 1909, the library functioned in the main university building. From 1906 to 1908, the current library building was erected following plans by architects Kálmán Giergl and Flóris Korb; books were then moved there in 1908–09. Extensions to the building were added until 1934, and an annex with a capacity of over 2,000,000 volumes was added in 1961. In 1996, the library began publishing Philobiblon, a biannual academic journal.

== See also ==
- List of libraries in Romania
