= Central University Library, Bucharest =

Library in Bucharest, Romania

Coordinates: 44°26′23.26″N 26°5′50.35″E

"Carol I" Central University Library
- Biblioteca Centrală Universitară „Carol I”
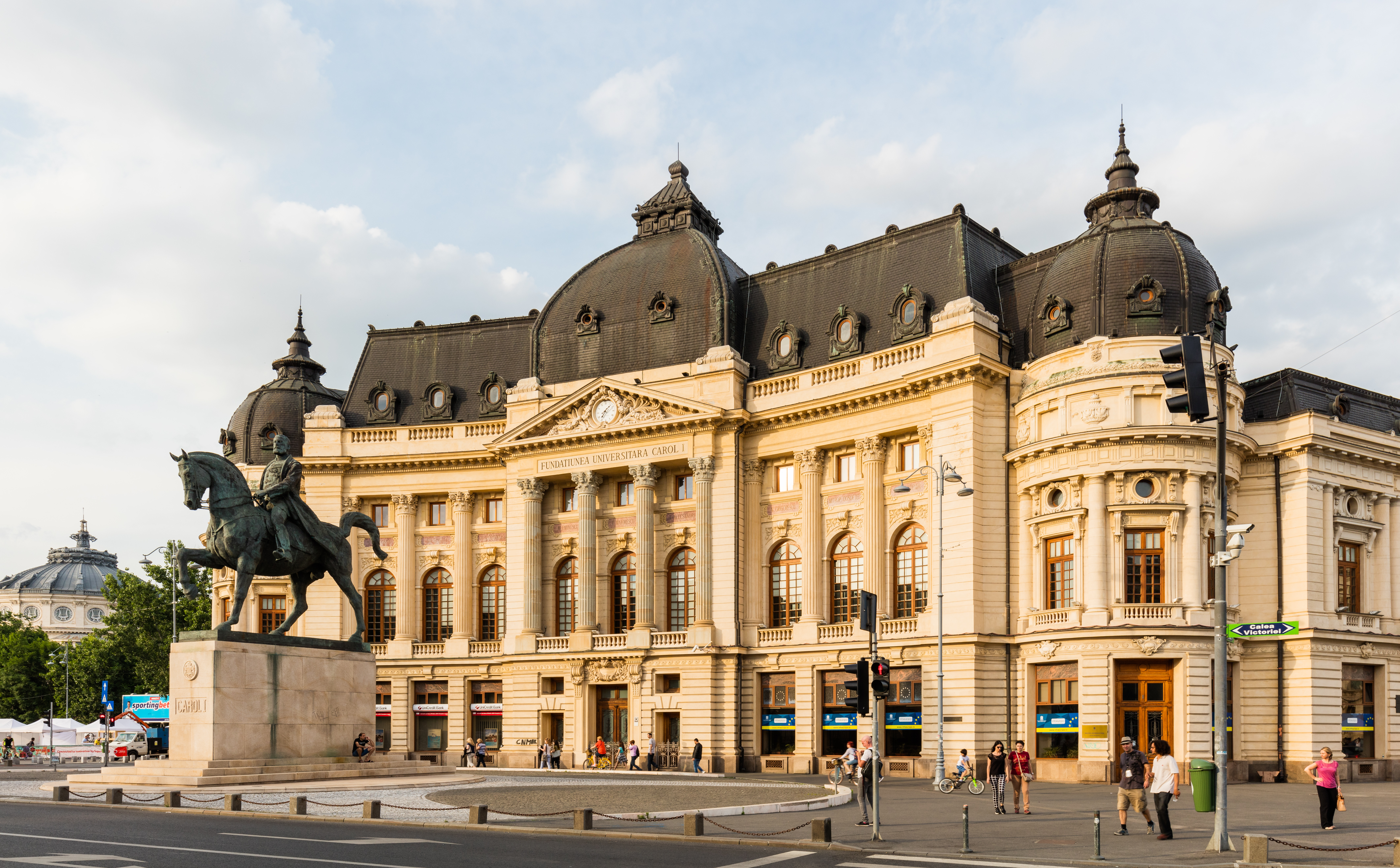
- The library in May 2016
- Interactive map of "Carol I" Central University Library
- Location: Strada Boteanu nr. 1, Bucharest, Romania
- Designer: Paul Gottereau
- Beginning date: 1891
- Completion date: 1893
- Dedicated to: The Romanian State
- Style: Beaux-Arts

The "Carol I" Central University Library of Bucharest (Romanian: Biblioteca Centrală Universitară „Carol I”) is a library in central Bucharest, located across the street from the National Museum of Art of Romania.

== History ==
When the University of Bucharest was created in 1864, there was no central university library; this role was played by the Central State Library of Bucharest until 1895. That institution was moved to, and housed in, the university building; in 1867, it was specially reorganized for the university's needs by the scholar August Treboniu Laurian. It had an unmistakable university quality, being governed by a special university committee (including the rector, the faculties' deans, the school ephor and the chief librarian as secretary), and the deans were always consulted for selection and purchasing. Nevertheless, the need for a proper central university library became increasingly apparent.

The present "Carol I" Central University Library was founded in 1895 as the Carol I Library of the University Foundation. It was built on land bought by King Carol I of Romania for the "Carol I University Foundation" (Fundația Universitară Carol I) and designed by French architect Paul Gottereau. The building was completed in 1893 and opened on 14 March 1895. In 1911, the building was extended by the same architect and the new wing was opened on 9 May 1914. It began with an initial stock of 3,400 volumes of books and periodicals. The collection grew to 7,264 volumes in 1899, 31,080 volumes in 1914, and 91,000 volumes in 1944. In 1949 (after its reorganization on 12 July 1948 as the Central Library of Bucharest University), the collection contained 516,916 volumes; in 1960, about a million; and over 2 million in 1970.

During the Romanian Revolution of 1989, a fire was started in the building and over 500,000 books, along with 3,700 manuscripts, were burnt. Starting in April 1990, the building was repaired and modernized, being reopened on 20 November 2001.

== Branch libraries ==
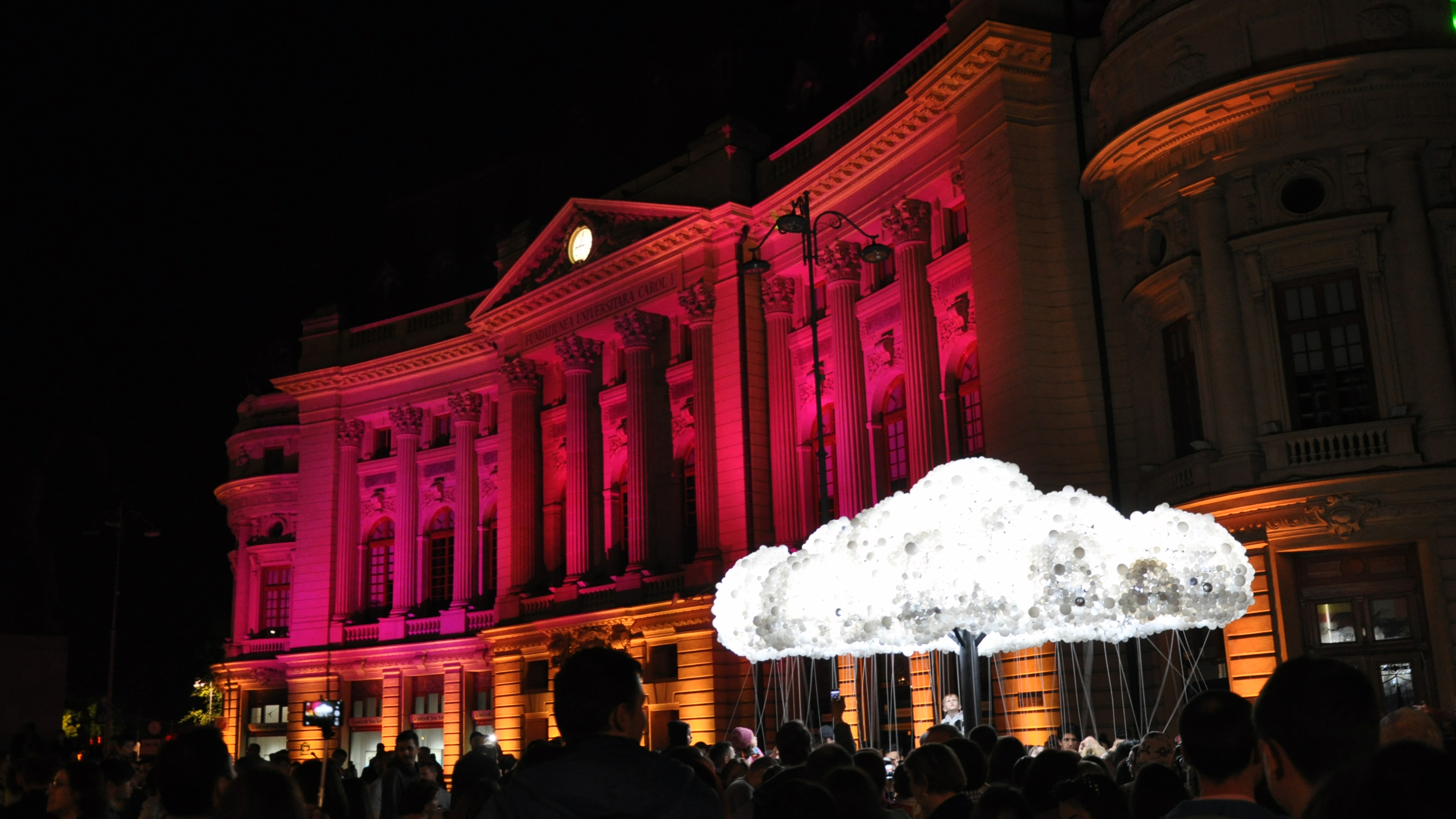
Central University Library in April 2015

In parallel with the development of the central library, a more complex network of specialized library branches was developed. For example, the Library of the Law Faculty was founded in 1873–76 (based on Professor Alexandru Lahovary's donation of books); in 1884 the Archaeological Seminary's Library was established through Professor Grigore Tocilescu's grant; and in 1892 the Library of the Slavic Languages Seminary began, based on Ion Bogdan's donation. These libraries functioned within the Faculty of Letters. Specialized libraries were also founded in the Sciences Faculty, such as the Mathematical Seminary's Library (after 1890), the Laboratory for Animal Physiology Library (1892, on the basis of Professor Alexandru Vitzu's grant); and the Laboratory for Plant Morphology Library (1893, using Professor D. Voinov's book donation). Until 1869, the Faculty of Medicine had only the customary collection, but by 1884 had a well-organised, specialized library.

In general, these libraries were founded and developed using teachers' donations, state grants and, after 1890, a percentage (usually 10%) of student-paid tuition.

== Honors ==
- (Romania) Romanian Royal Family: 81st Member of the Royal Decoration of the Cross of the Romanian Royal House

== See also ==
- List of libraries in Romania
- Seven Wonders of Romania
