= Alajos Hauszmann =

Hungarian architect (1847–1926)

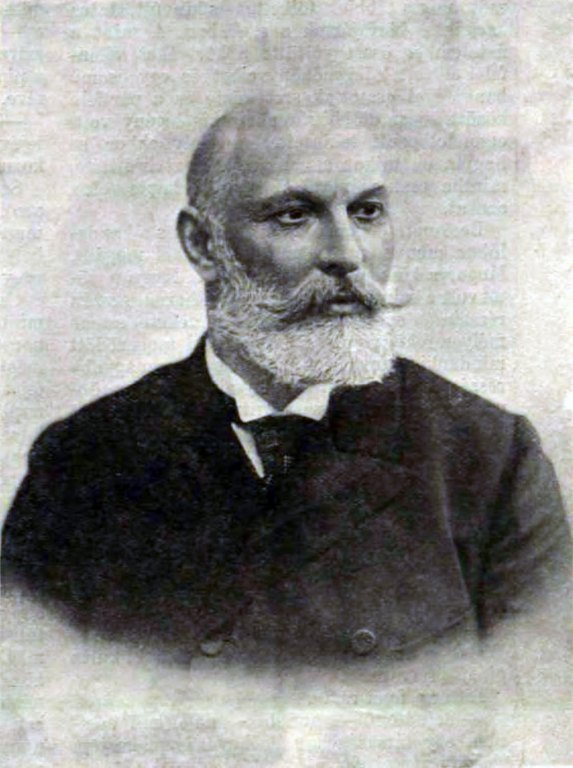
- Born: 9 June 1847; Buda, Kingdom of Hungary, Austrian Empire
- Died: 31 July 1926 (aged 79); Velence, Kingdom of Hungary
- Education: TU Berlin, Berlin; Technical University of Budapest, Budapest
- Occupation: Architect
- Spouse: Mariette Senior
- Children: Gizella
- Practice: Ödön Lechner

Alajos Hauszmann (also called as Alois, June 9, 1847 – July 31, 1926), from 1918 Hauszmann de Velencze, was a Hungarian architect, professor, and member of the Hungarian Academy of Sciences.

== Life ==
Hauszmann was born in Buda in 1847 into a family of Bavarian origin as the son of Ferenc Hauszmann and Anna Maár (siblings: Hermina (1845–1929), Ferenc (1850–1918) and Kornélia (1854–1837)). He studied painting from 1861, then became a bricklayer's apprentice. In 1864 he attended the Royal Joseph University, and in 1866 he continued architecture studies at the Bauakademie in Berlin, along with Ödön Lechner.

- 1868 Assistant Professor at the Royal Joseph University
- 1869–1870. Grand tour of Italy to study renaissance architecture
- 1872 Professor at the Royal Joseph University for the next 40 years
- 1874 Married Mariette Senior, whom he met in Berlin
- Designed barracks for the Red Cross, to be known as Hauszmann-barracks in Austria and Switzerland
- 1891 Named chief architect for Buda Castle in Budapest
- Received the Order of Franz Joseph, Grand Cross

Hauszmann employed several architects who later became prominent in their own right, including Albert Kálmán Kőrössy. In 1912 Hauszmann retired, and a year later he created a foundation for young architects graduating from the Royal Joseph University. In 1914 he went on an extended journey to Egypt and the Holy Land. In recognition of his work, he was ennobled by King Charles IV of Hungary with the suffix de Velencze on March 10, 1918. In the following year, his private home was confiscated during the Hungarian Soviet Republic. In 1924 he was elected an honorary member of the Hungarian Academy of Sciences. He died, aged 79, in Velence. He is buried in the Kerepesi Cemetery in Budapest.

== Major works ==
=== Architecture and design ===
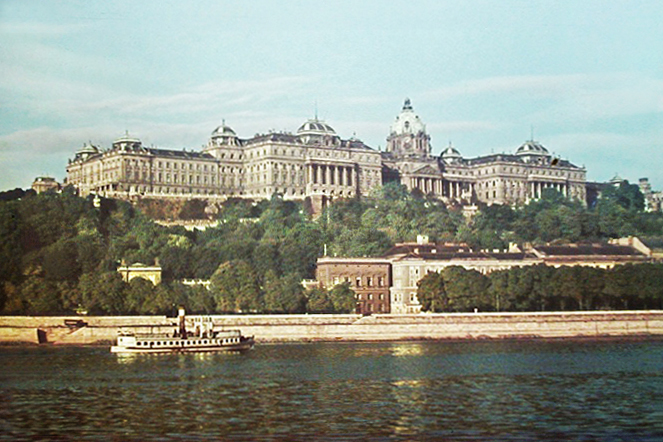
View of Buda Castle

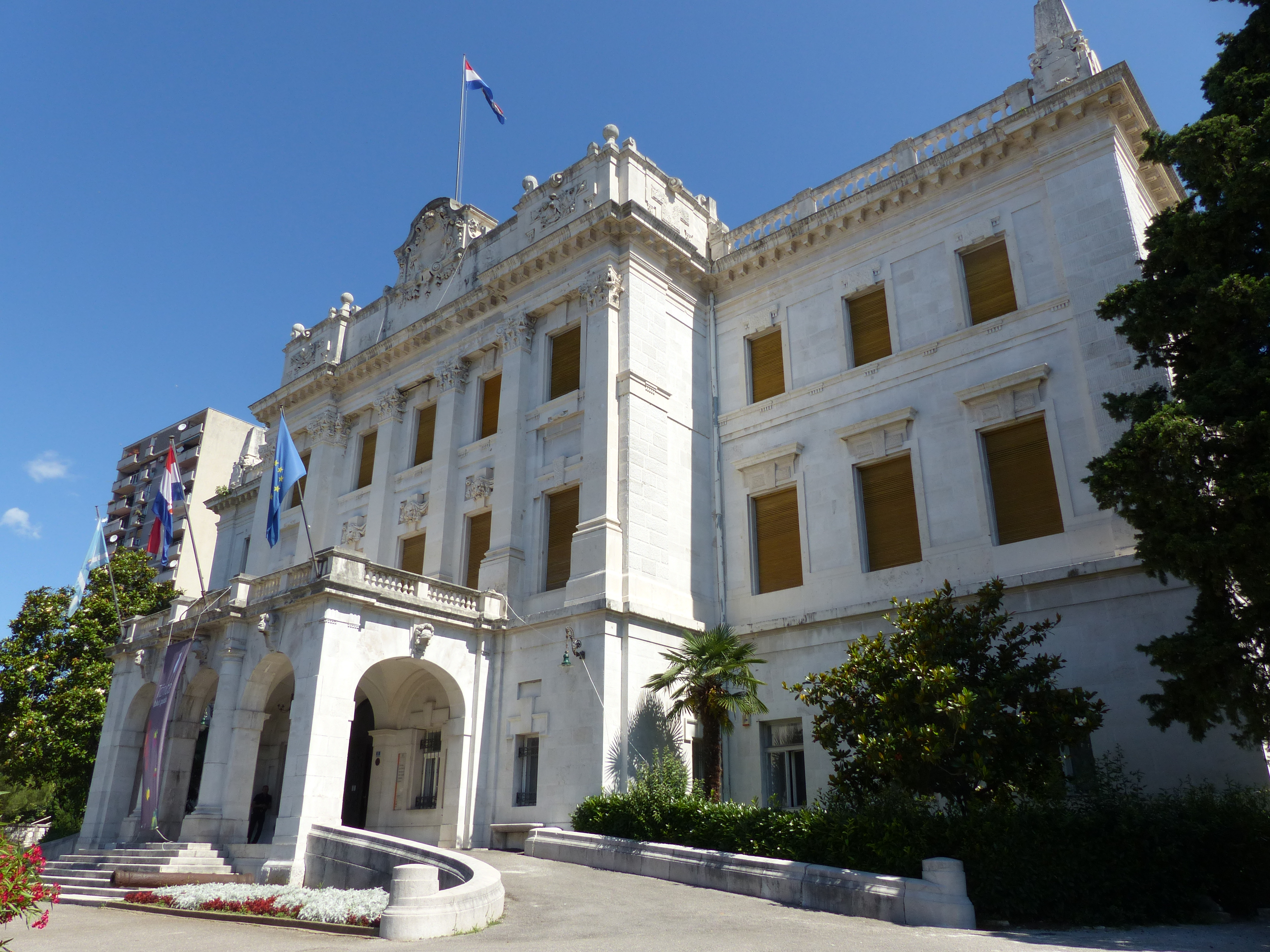
Governor's Palace - Rijeka

- 1870 German Theater, Budapest (destroyed by fire in 1890)
- 1870 Kiosk, Erzsébet tér, Budapest (destroyed)
- 1871–1872 Tüköry palace, Budapest (destroyed)
- 1874–1875 Coburg palace, Budapest (destroyed)
- 1876 Church of the Sacred Heart, Gyoma
- 1876–1878 Kégl mansion, Székesfehérvár
- 1877–1878 City Hall and theater, Szombathely (destroyed)
- 1878 Stefánia Yacht Club, Balatonfüred
- 1878–1879 Kégl palace, Budapest
- 1878–1880 St. Stephen Hospital, Budapest
- 1881–1883 Austro-Hungarian Bank, Szombathely
- 1882 Hungarian Parliament Building, Budapest (prize winning design, not built)
- 1882–1884 Erzsébet Hospital for the Red Cross, Budapest
- 1883–1884 Teachers' Training College, Budapest
- 1883–1884 Főreáliskola, Budapest
- 1884 Teachers' Training Institute, Budapest
- 1884 Scottish Abbey, Budapest (destroyed)
- 1884–1885 Nádasdy Mansion renovation and chapel, Nádasdladány
- 1884–1885 Batthyány palace, Budapest
- 1884–1886 Girls' Lyceum, Sopron
- 1884–1889 University Pathology Institute, Kolozsvár (today Cluj-Napoca)
- 1886 University Public Health Institute, Kolozsvár (today Cluj-Napoca)
- 1886 State Institute for Teaching Women, Budapest
- 1886–1887 Institute for Forensic Medicine, Budapest
- 1887–1889 Northeast Railroad Company apartment building, Budapest
- 1887–1889 Technical Training School and Museum, Budapest
- 1888–1890 Budapest Court House and Penitentiary, Budapest
- 1889–1890 commercial building, Budapest
- 1890 Kálmán Széll's mansion, Rátót
- 1890–1894 County hospital, Nitra
- 1891–1905 Buda Castle, Budapest, including the interiors
- 1891 Hauszmann house, Budapest
- 1890–1894 New York Palace, Budapest
- 1893 General Hospital, Kolozsvár (today Cluj-Napoca)
- 1893–1896 Royal Hungarian Palace of Justice, Budapest (Kúria, today: Ethnographic Museum)
- 1893–1897 Governor's Palace, Rijeka
- 1902–1909 Royal Joseph University, central building, Budapest
- 1904 City Hall, Nagyvárad (today Oradea)
- 1910 National Theater, Budapest (not built)

=== Publications ===
- A budapesti igazságügyi palota (Magy. Mérnök és Építész Egyl. Közl., 1897)
- A kir. József műegyetem új otthona (Magy. Mérnök és Építész Egyl. Közl., 1909)
- A magyar királyi vár (Budapest, 1912)
- Budapest városának építészeti fejlődésének története (Akad. Ért. 1925).
