= Gyula Pártos =

Hungarian architect (1845–1916)

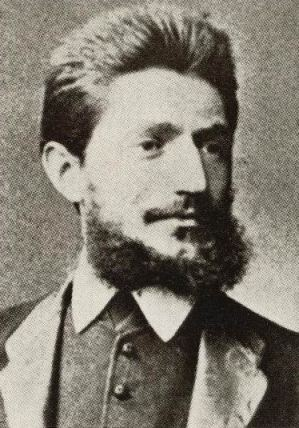
- Gyula Pártos
- Born: Julius Puntzmann; 17 August 1845; Apatin, Kingdom of Hungary
- Died: 22 December 1916; Budapest, Austria-Hungary
- Education: TU Berlin, Berlin
- Occupation: Architect
- Spouse: Vittorina Bartolucci
- Buildings: St. Stephen's Church, Kiskunfélegyháza; Royal Hungarian Vocational School of Mechanics and Watchmaking, Budapest

Gyula Pártos (born Julius Puntzmann, 17 August 1845 – 22 December 1916) was a Hungarian architect. Together with Ödön Lechner he designed a number of buildings in the typical Szecesszió (Art Nouveau) style of fin-de-siècle Hungary. He was the brother-in-law of the lawyer and politician Béla Pártos, the husband of opera singer Vittorina Bartolucci, and the father-in-law of composer and opera director Miklós Radnai.

== Career ==
At the beginning of his career he studied under Antal Szkalnitzky in Buda, who was responsible for a large number of the monumental public buildings that shaped the city and its sister across the Danube, Pest, before the two cities merged in 1873. He then moved on to the Technische Hochschule in Charlottenburg (now Technische Universität Berlin), where he was a classmate of both Alajos Hauszmann and Ödön Lechner, and obtained a degree in architecture in 1870.

After graduation Pártos and Lechner established a fruitful partnership which lasted until 1896, crowned by their ultimate work, the design of the Budapest Museum of Applied Arts. Supposedly, Lechner was in charge of most of the artistic aspects of the practice, while Pártos took command of the organizational tasks. However, Pártos proved to be a capable designer in his own right, and a number of their works can be attributed wholly or nearly entirely to him, including St. Stephen's Church (1873–77) and Kalmár Chapel (1875–76), both in Kiskunfélegyháza; as well as the Bazaar of the Reformed Church in Kecskemét (1877).

Working independently after 1896, he received numerous commissions over the next 16 years in the capital as well as in Győr, Cegléd, and Bratislava (then still called Pozsony and part of the Hungarian half of the Austro-Hungarian Empire). Some of these designs followed in Lechner's footsteps but others reflect the historicism in which he was trained. He died in Budapest at age 71, two years after Lechner, in the midst of the First World War.

== Works ==
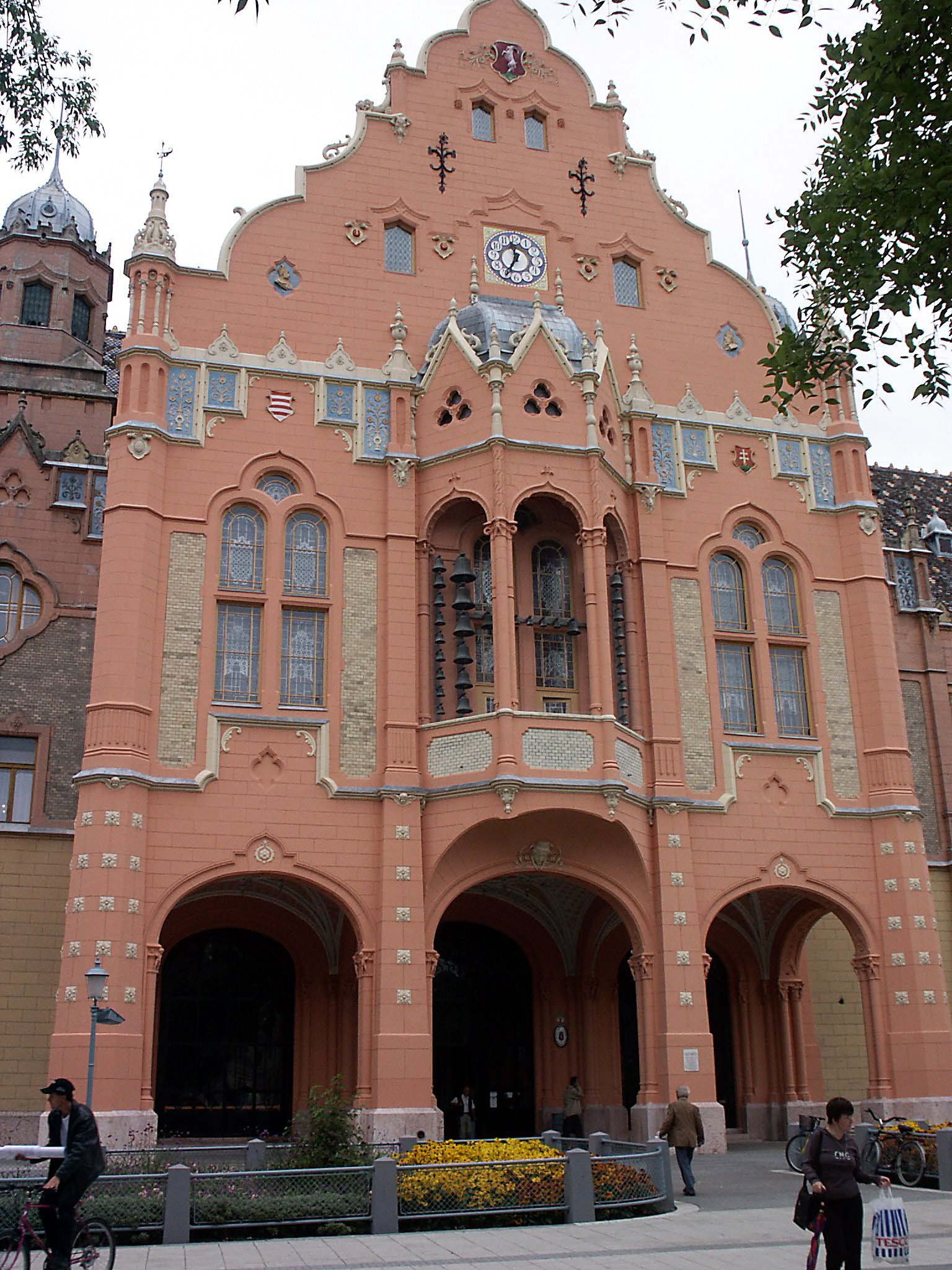
City Hall, Kecskemét, Hungary

- 1860-05: St. Stephen's Church and Carmelite Convent, Sombor, Serbia
- 1871–72: Apartment building, Budapest, Bajcsy-Zsilinszky utca 43.
- 1873–77: St. Stephen's Church, Kiskunfélegyháza, Szent István tér 3.
- 1875–76: Kalmár Chapel, Kiskunfélegyháza, Móra Ferenc tér 17.
- 1877: Bazaar of the Reformed Church, Kecskemét.
- 1881–84: Szeged City Hall (with Ödön Lechner).
- 1882: Sombor City Hall, Serbia.
- 1883: Milkó Palace, Szeged, Roosevelt Square 5 (with Ödön Lechner).
- 1883–86: Drechsler Palace (also known as MÁV Hungarian Railway Pension House), Budapest, Andrássy út 25 (with Ödön Lechner).
- 1885–86: Torontál County hall (today Zrenjanin City Hall) Zrenjanin, Serbia (with Ödön Lechner).
- 1887: Rudolf cavalry barracks, Kecskemét (with Ödön Lechner).
- 1888–90: Thonet House, Budapest, Váci utca 11A (with Ödön Lechner).
- 1891: Gymnasium of Srijemski Karlovci, Kingdom of Croatia-Slavonia (today Sremski Karlovci, Serbia) (with Ödön Lechner).
- 1891–96: Museum of Applied Arts, Budapest (with Ödön Lechner).
- 1893: Szekszárd Hotel, Szekszárd, Garay tér 7 (with Ödön Lechner).
- 1893: Baja Savings Bank, (now the István Türr Museum building).
- 1893–97: Kecskemét City Hall, together with Ödön Lechner.
- 1896: Szekszárd High School.
- 1900–01: Royal Hungarian State Mechanical Clock Vocational School (now the Kandó Kálmán College of Electrical Engineering as part of the University of Óbuda), Budapest, Tavaszmező utca 15.
- 1903: Headquarters of the Post and Telegraph Directorate, Poszony (today Bratislava).
- 1903: Cegléd High School (today Kossuth High School), Cegléd, Rákóczi út 46.
- 1903–05: Black Eagle Hotel, Hódmezővásárhely, Kossuth tér 3.
- 1905–06: Girls' Orphanage and Education Institute of the National Association of Hungarian Women, today: Antal Szerb High School, Budapest, Batthyány Ilona utca 12.
- 1907: Italian Embassy, Budapest, Stefánia út 95.
- 1910–11: Royal Hungarian State Women's Industrial School (now the András Jelky Secondary School of Applied Arts), Budapest, Rákóczi tér 4–5.
- 1910–12: Elementary school on Kálmán Street in Tóth (today the 9th District József Attila Primary School and Primary School of Art), Budapest, Kálmán utca 35.
- Undated: Theater, Sombor, Serbia.
- Undated: Civic school, Košice, Moyzesova street.

== Gallery ==
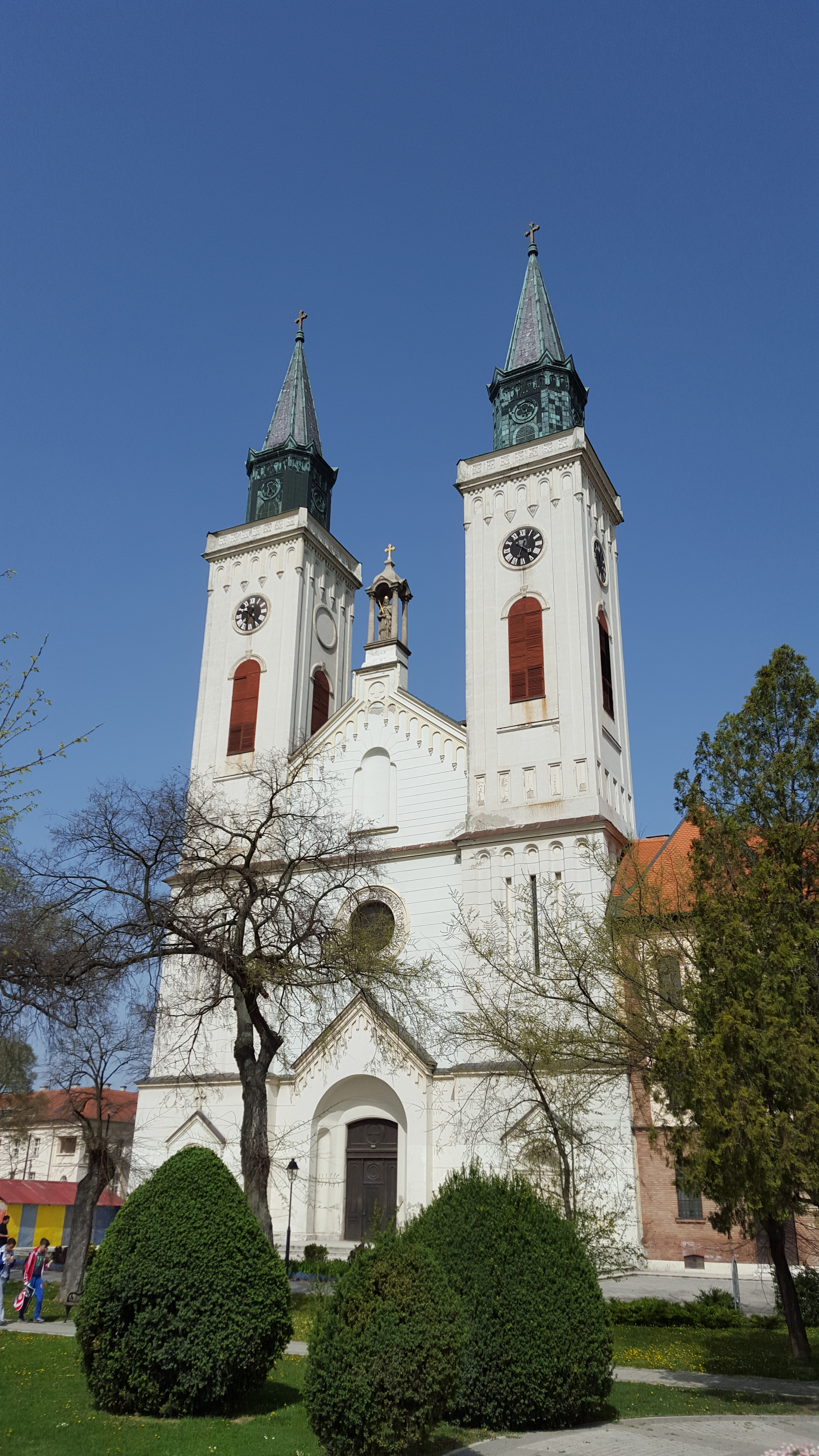
Catholic Church of St. Stephen and Carmelite Convent, Sombor, Serbia

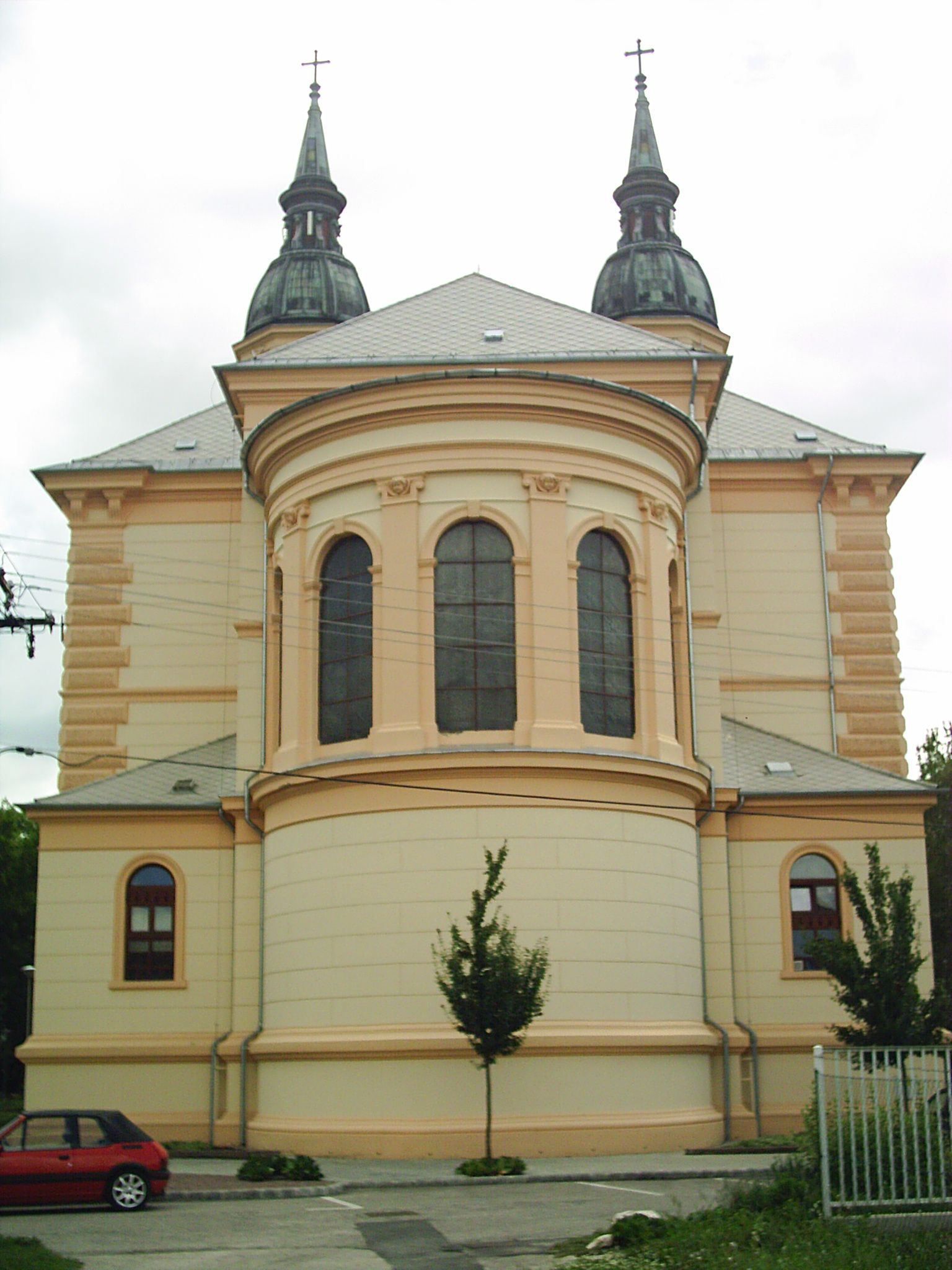
St. Stephen's Church, Kiskunfélegyháza

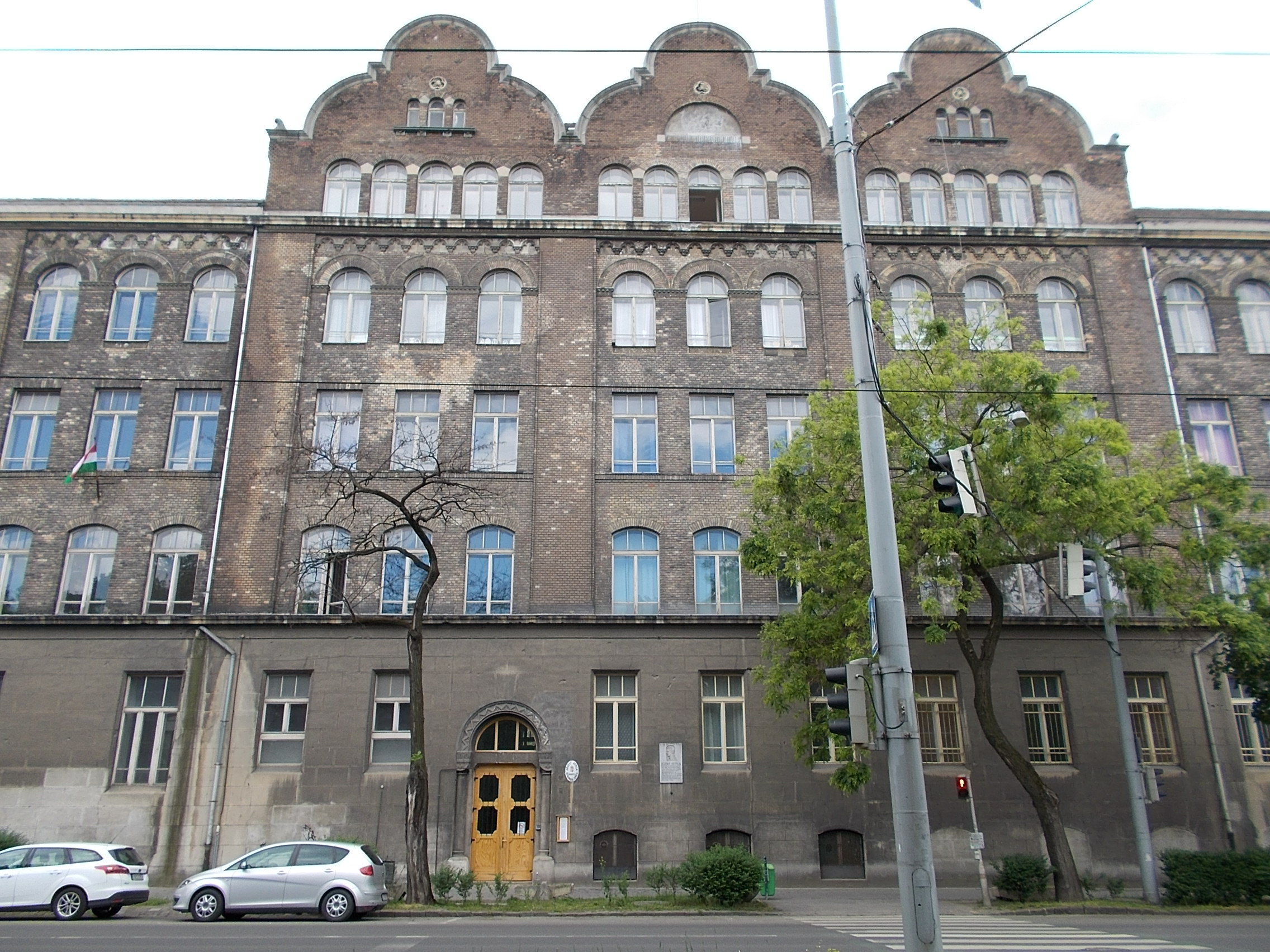
József Attila Primary School and Primary School of Art, Budapest

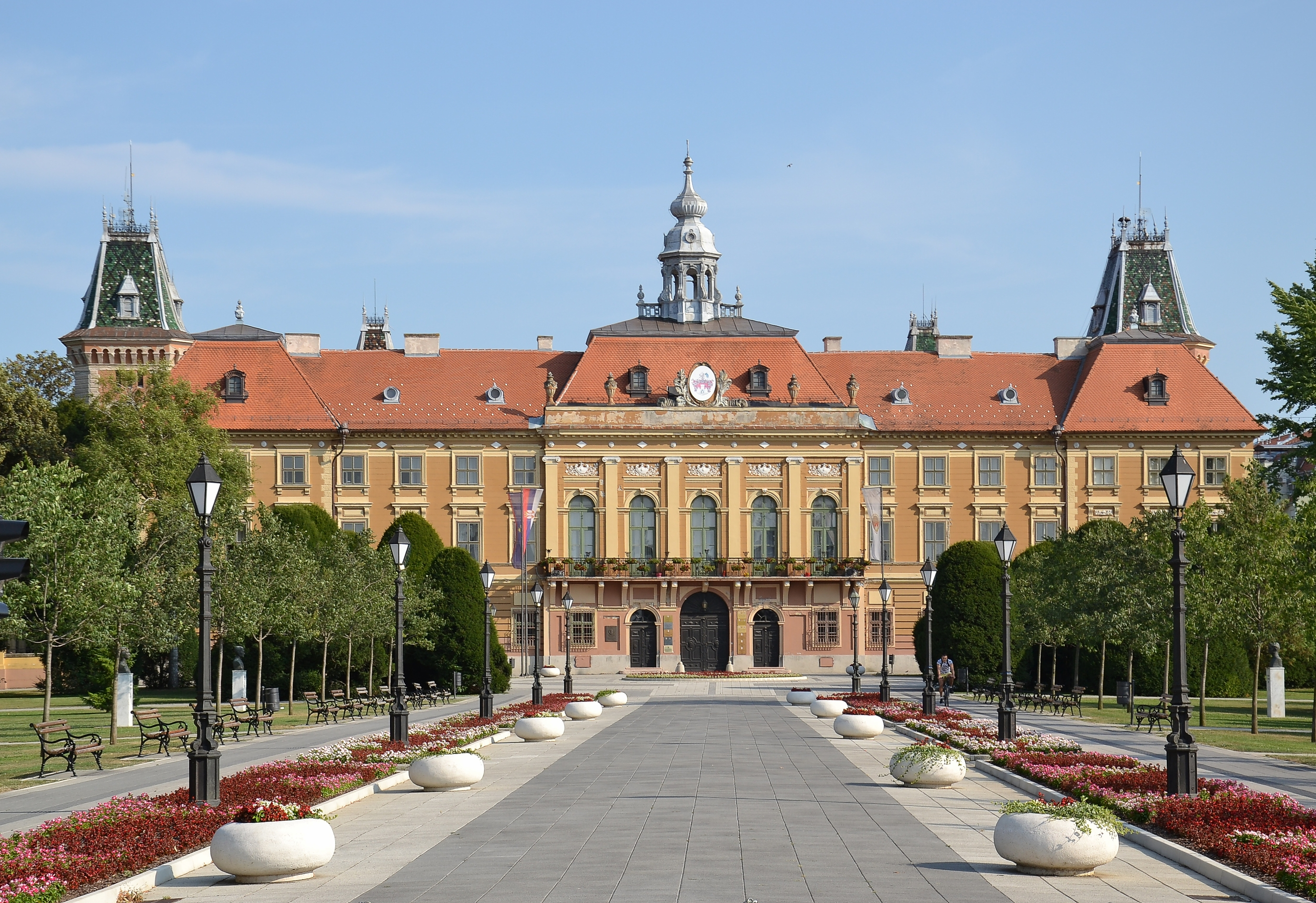
Sombor City Hall, Serbia

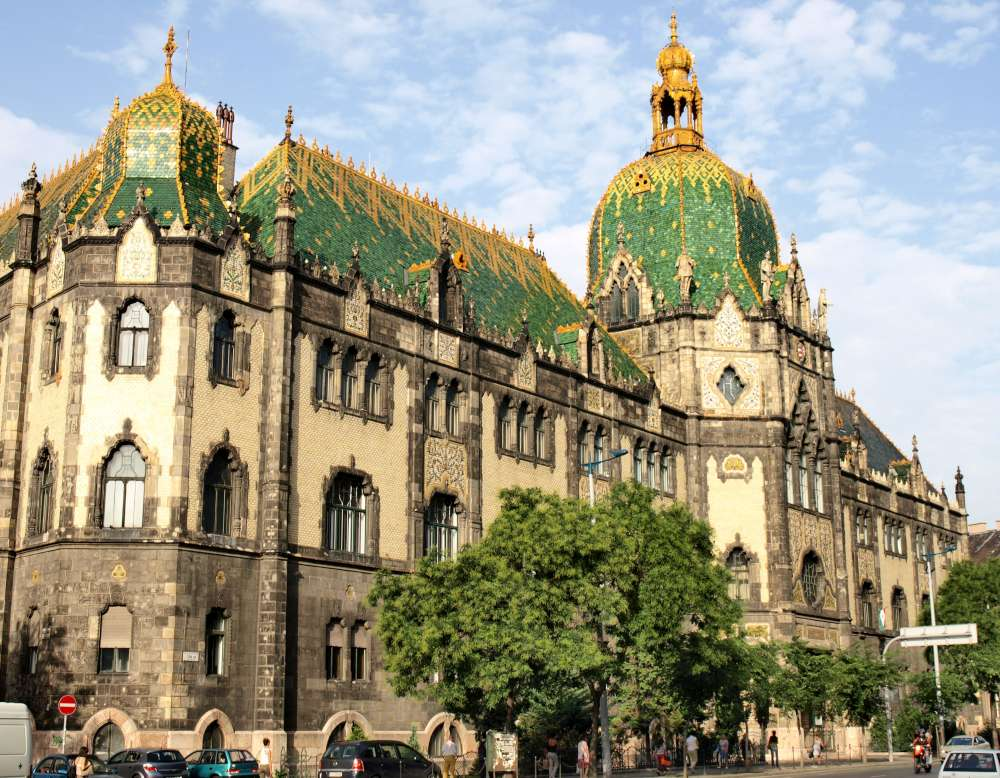
Museum of Applied Arts (Iparművészeti Múzeum), Budapest

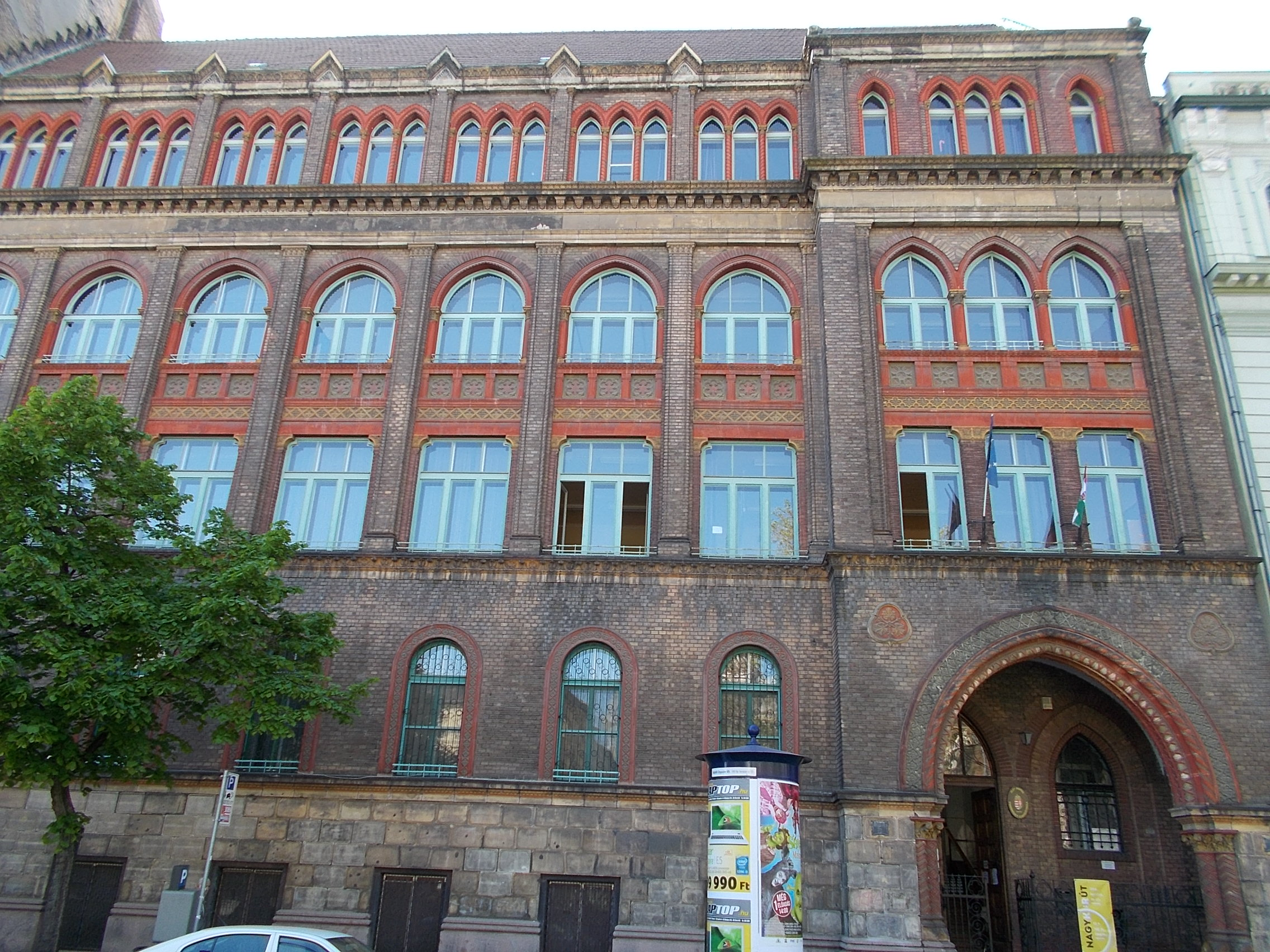
Jelky András Clothing Vocational School and High School, Budapest

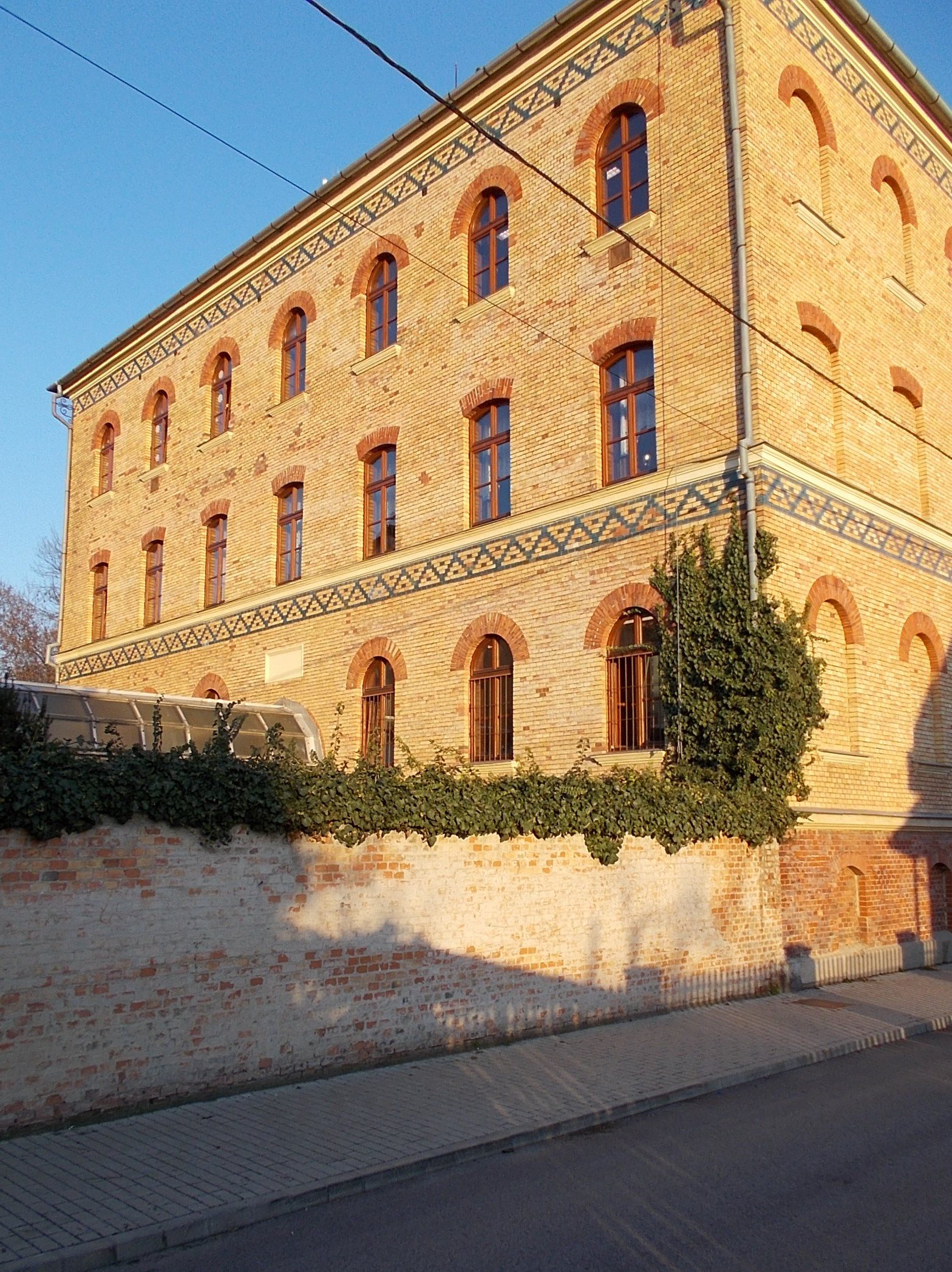
Girls' Orphanage and Education Institute of the National Association of Hungarian Women, Budapest

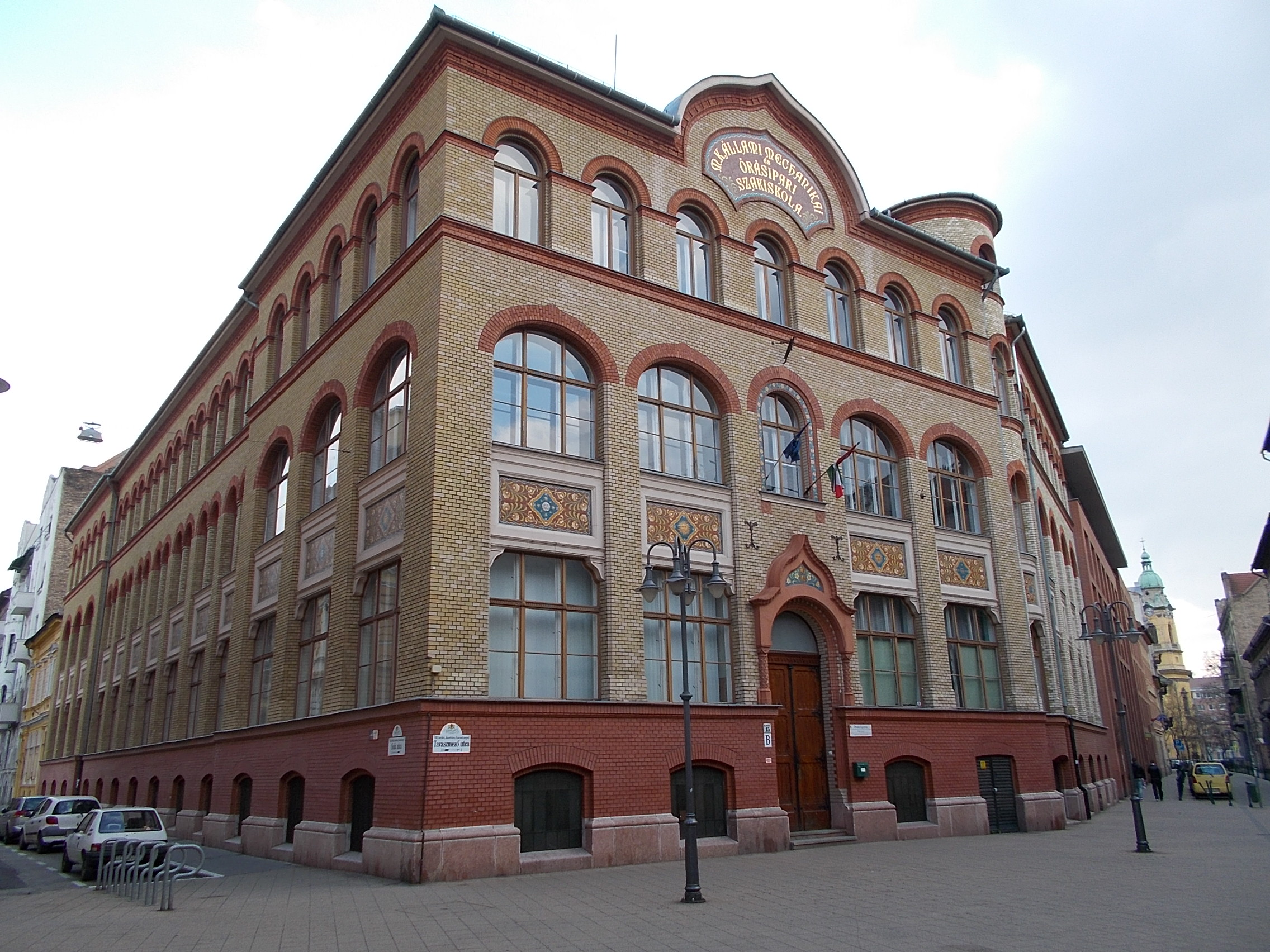
Royal Hungarian State Mechanical Clock Vocational School, Budapest

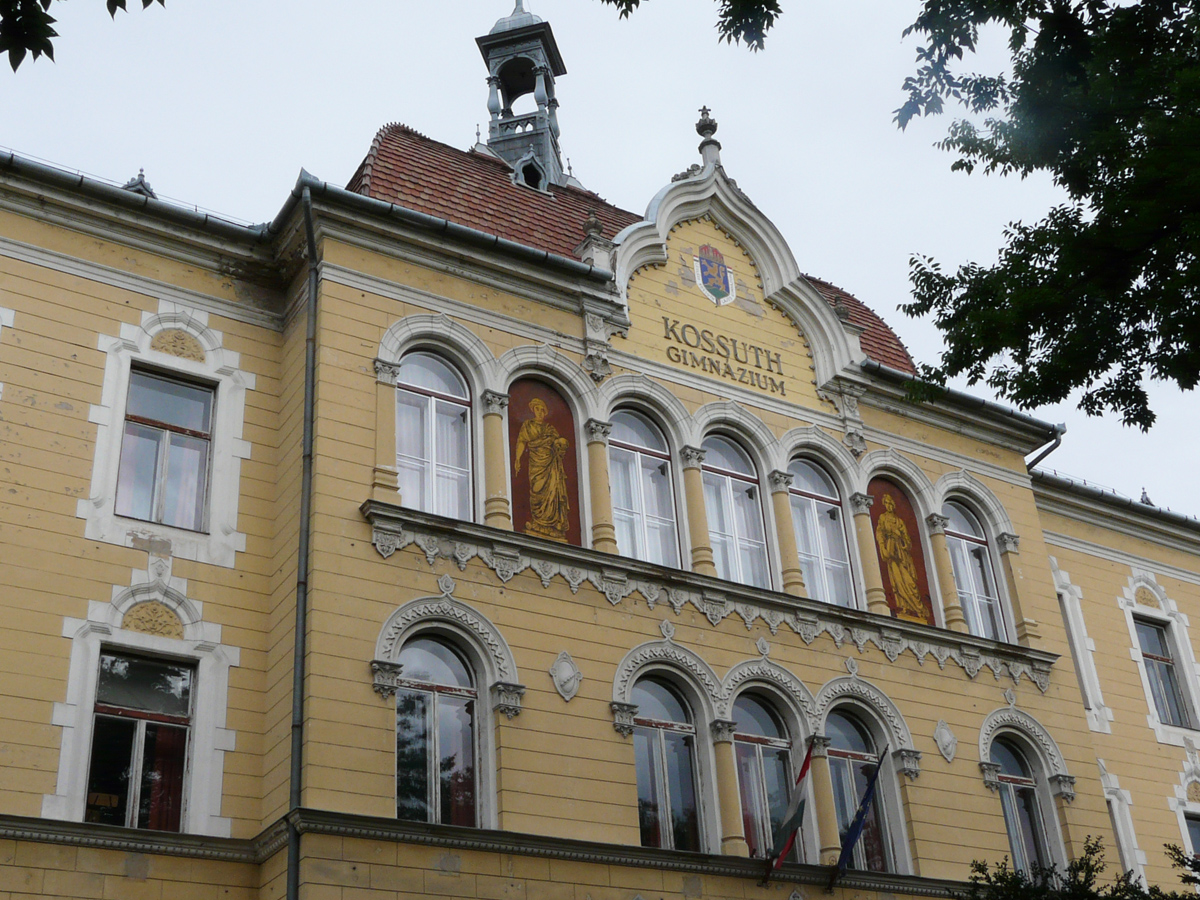
Főgimnázium, Cegléd

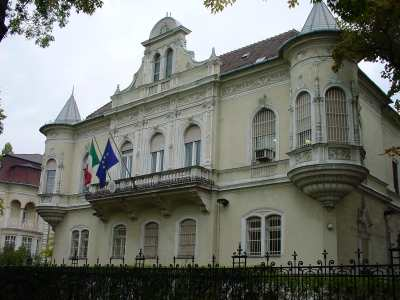
Italian Embassy, Budapest

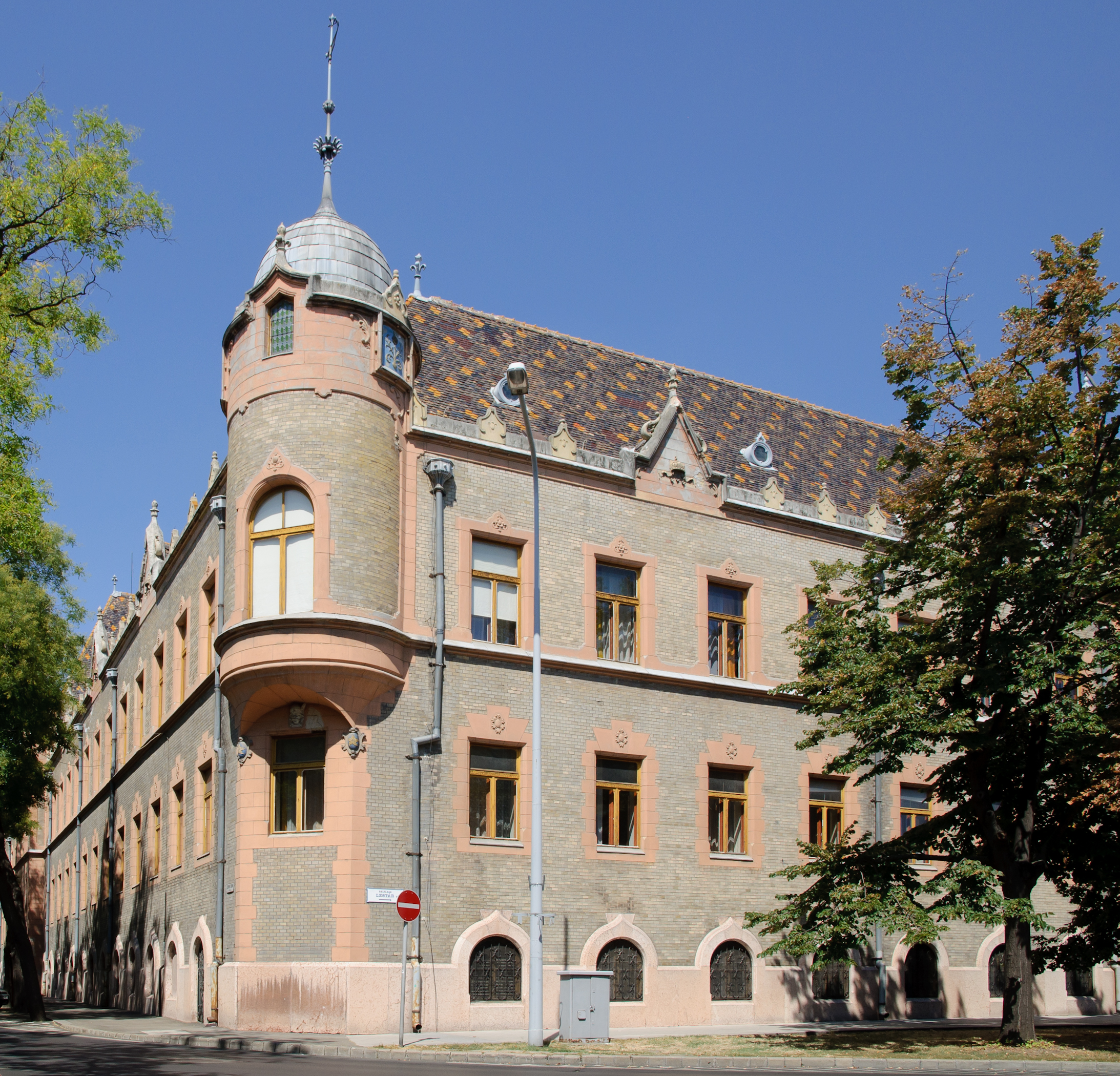
Kecskemet City Hall

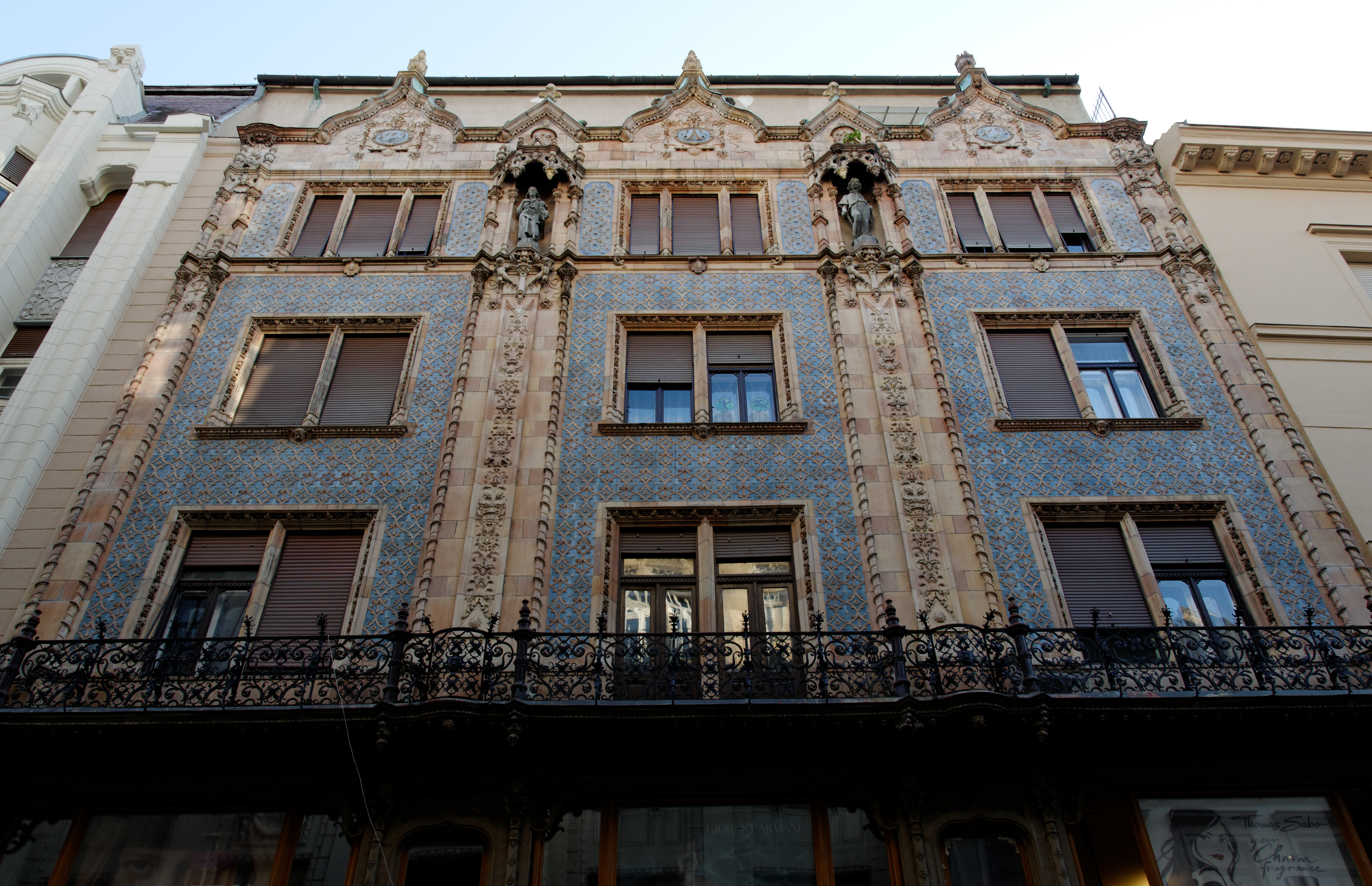
Thonet House, Budapest

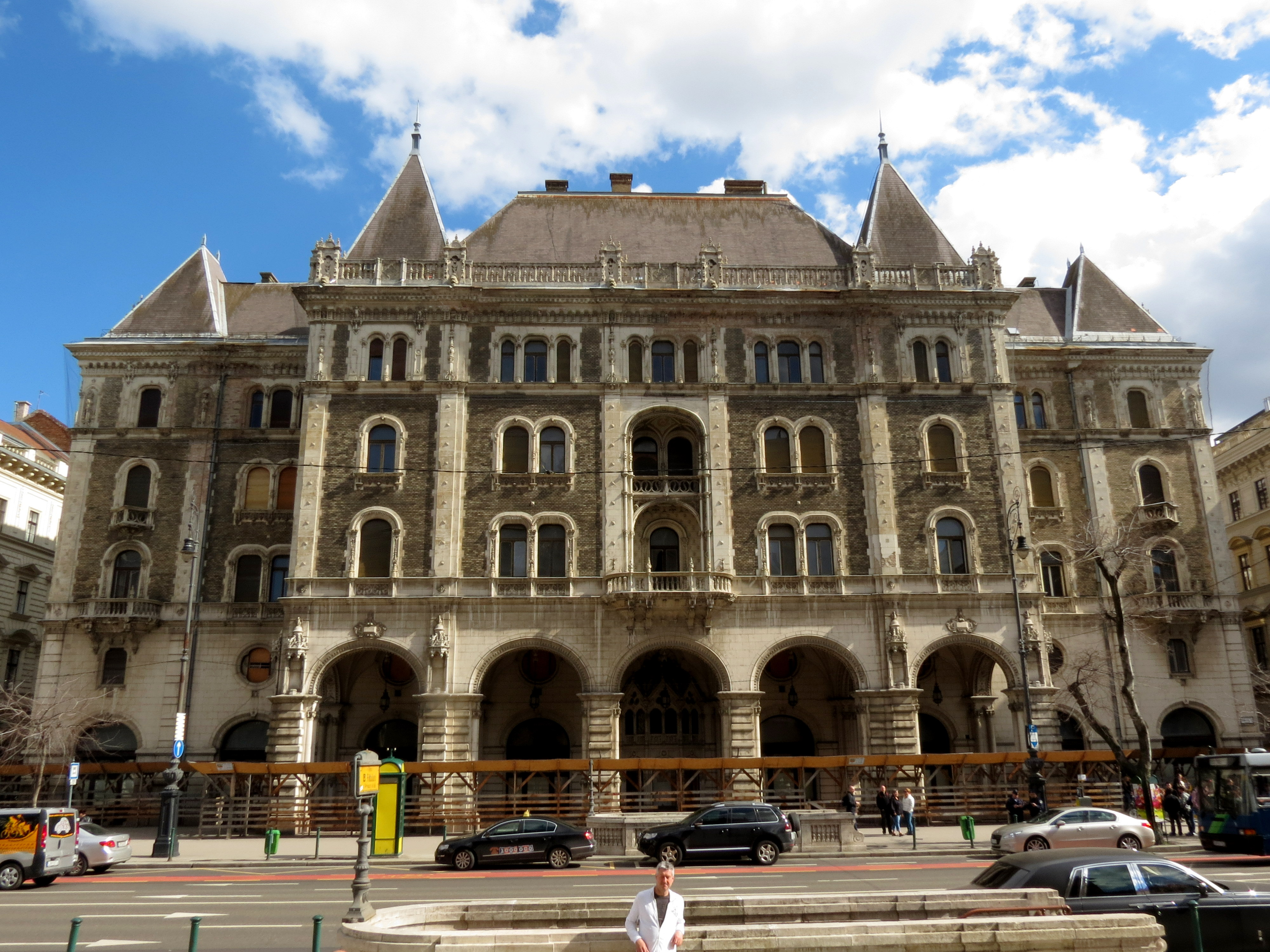
Drechsler Palace, Budapest

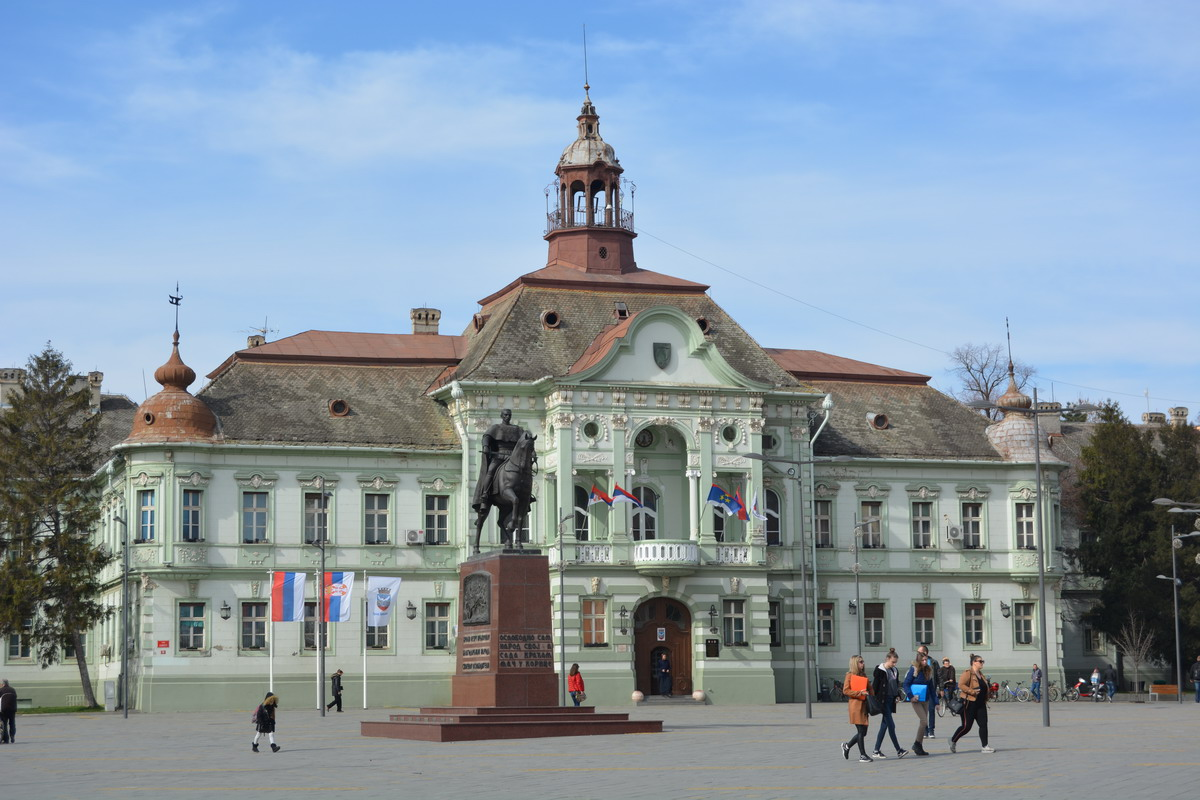
Zrenjanin City Hall, Zrenjanin, Serbia

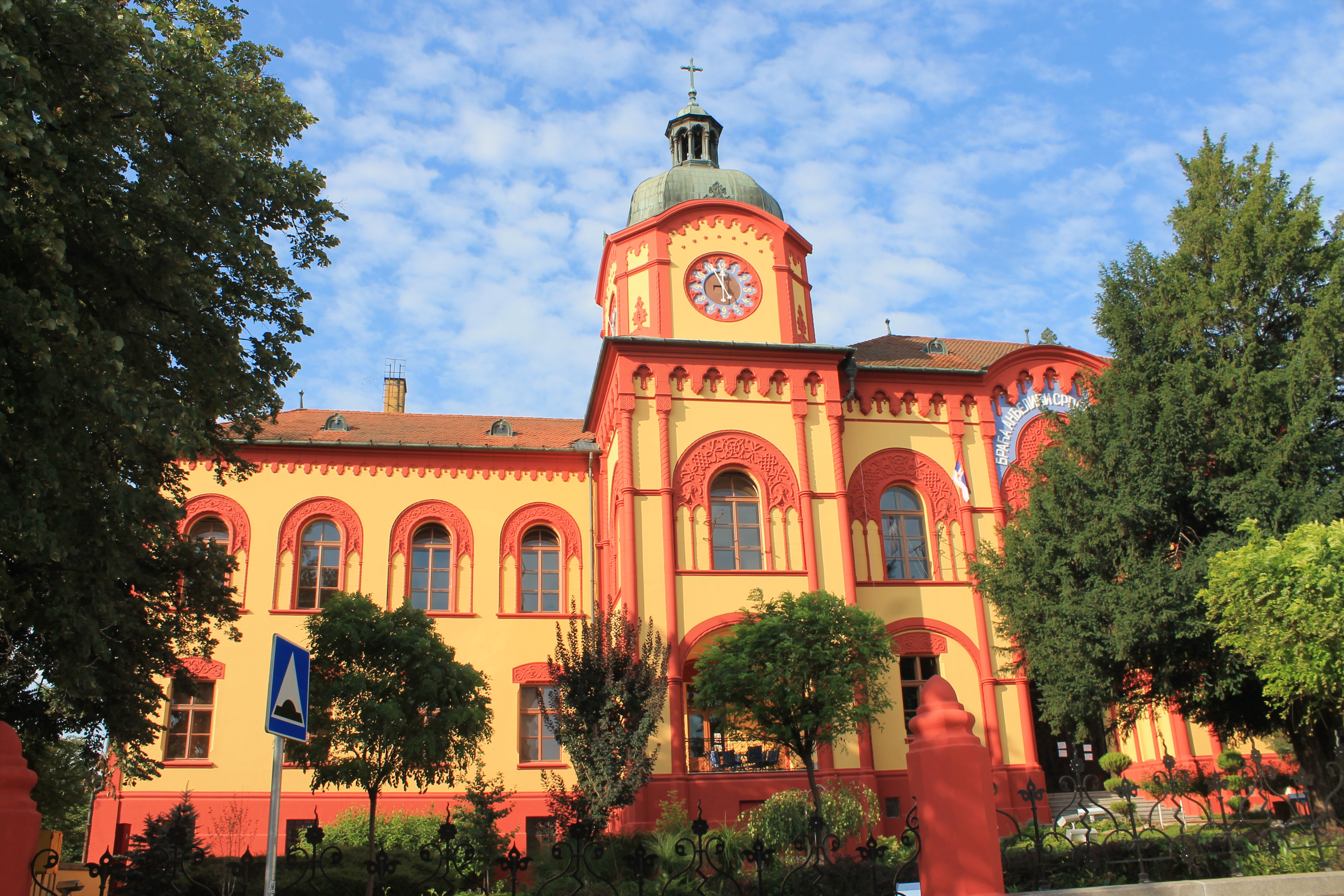
Karlovci Gymnasium, Sremski Karlovci, Serbia

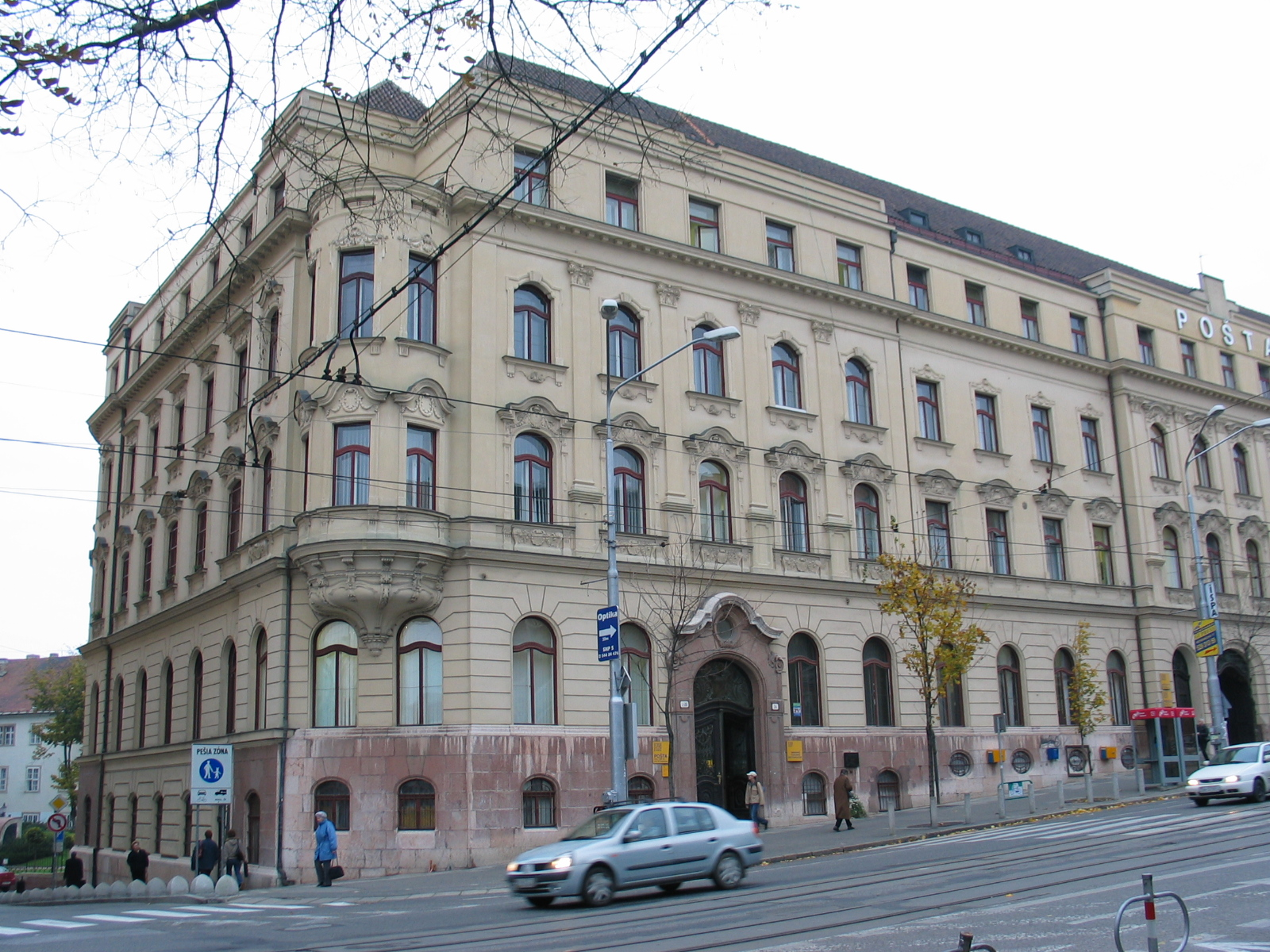
Headquarters of the Post and Telegraph Directorate, Bratislava, Slovakia

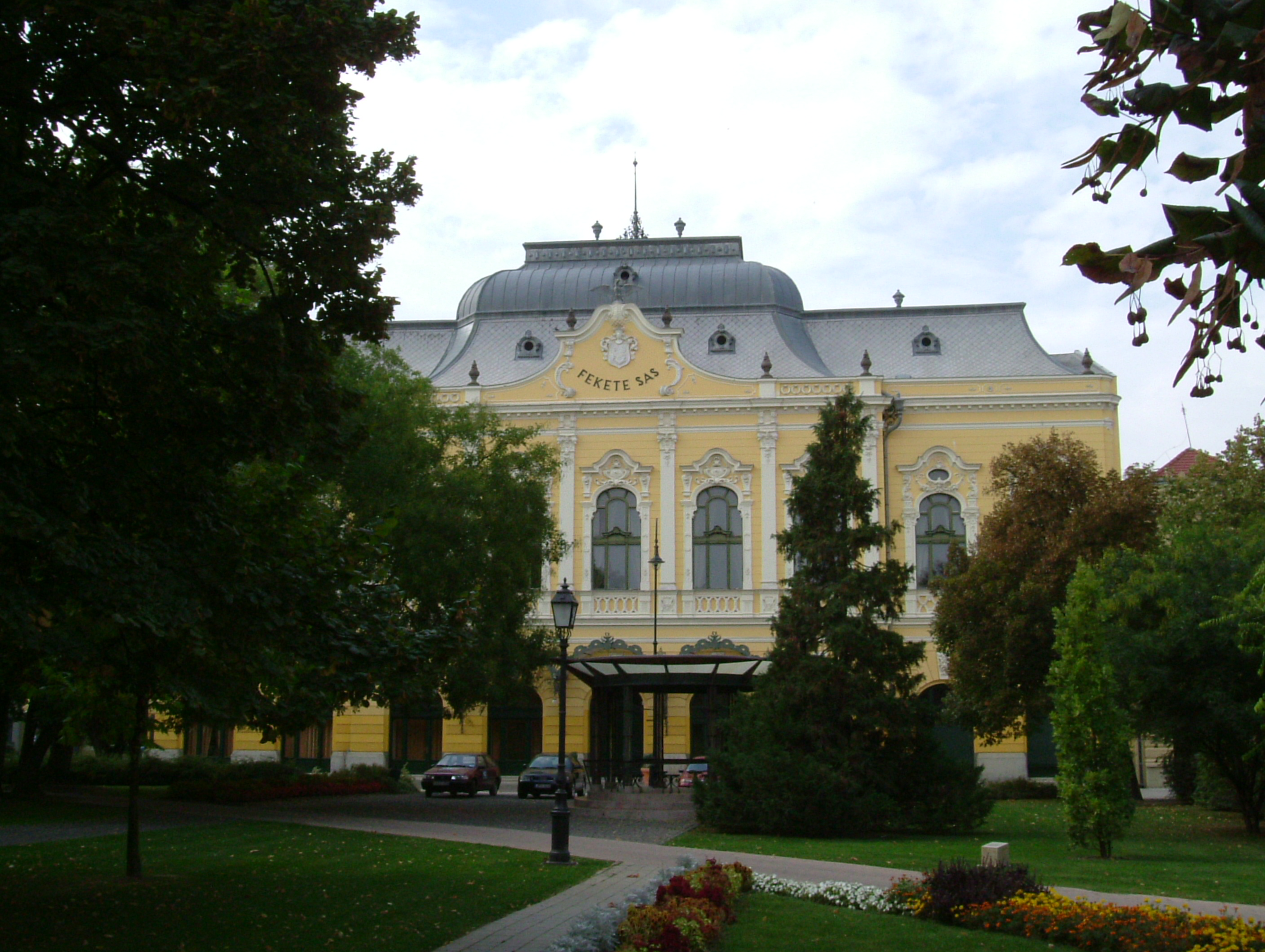
Black Eagle Hotel, Hódmezővásárhely

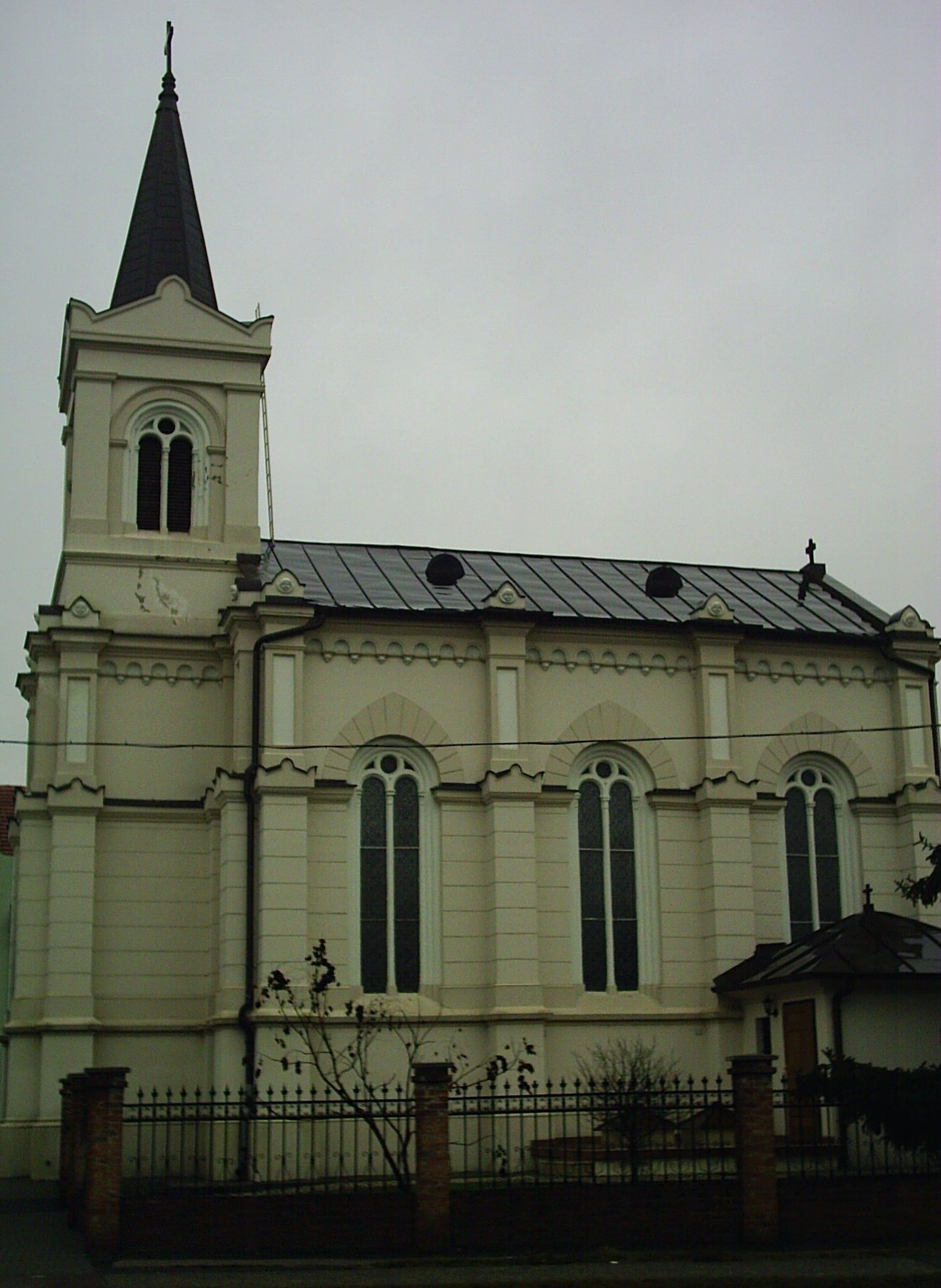
Kalmár Chapel, Kiskunfélegyháza

== Bibliography ==
- Hungarian Biographical Lexicon (Magyar életrajzi lexikon, i. h.)
- Biographical Index

== See also ==
- Ödön Lechner
- Szecesszió (Art Nouveau)
