= City Hall of Kecskemét =

City Hall of Kecskemét (Kecskeméti Városháza)
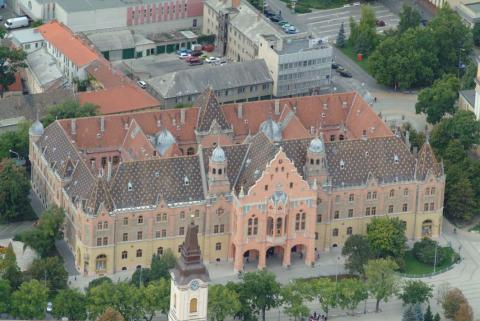
- Aerial photo

- Location within Kecskemét Location within Bács-Kiskun County Location within Hungary

General information
- Type: Seat of local government
- Architectural style: Art Nouveau
- Location: Kossuth Square, Kecskemét, Bács-Kiskun County, Hungary
- Coordinates: 46.906558°N 19.69135°E
- Construction started: 1893
- Completed: 1897

Design and construction
- Architect: Ödön Lechner
- Other designers: Gyula Pártos

The City Hall of Kecskemét (Hungarian: Kecskeméti Városháza) is a city hall building located in the Kossuth Square (town square), of Kecskemét, in the Bács-Kiskun County, Hungary.

The current building was built between 1893 and 1897 in the Art Nouveau style. It was designed by Ödön Lechner and Gyula Pártos.

== History of the building ==
The former City Hall of Kecskemét was a Neoclassical building. By the mid-19th century, it was in very poor condition. The city council wanted to meet an old demand when it announced a design competition for a new building in 1890. Of the five entries received, the jury awarded the first prize to Ödön Lechner and Gyula Pártos for their design, which were nominated with not terrible height or depth.

In 1869 Lechner associated with Pártos and opened a construction office together. Of these, Lechner was the artist and Pártos was the entrepreneur. The building was constructed between 1893 and 1897 in the Art Nouveau style. In 1911, after an earthquake, it was restored under Lechner's control.

Between 1897 and 1996, the building hosted the City Library.

== Description of the building ==
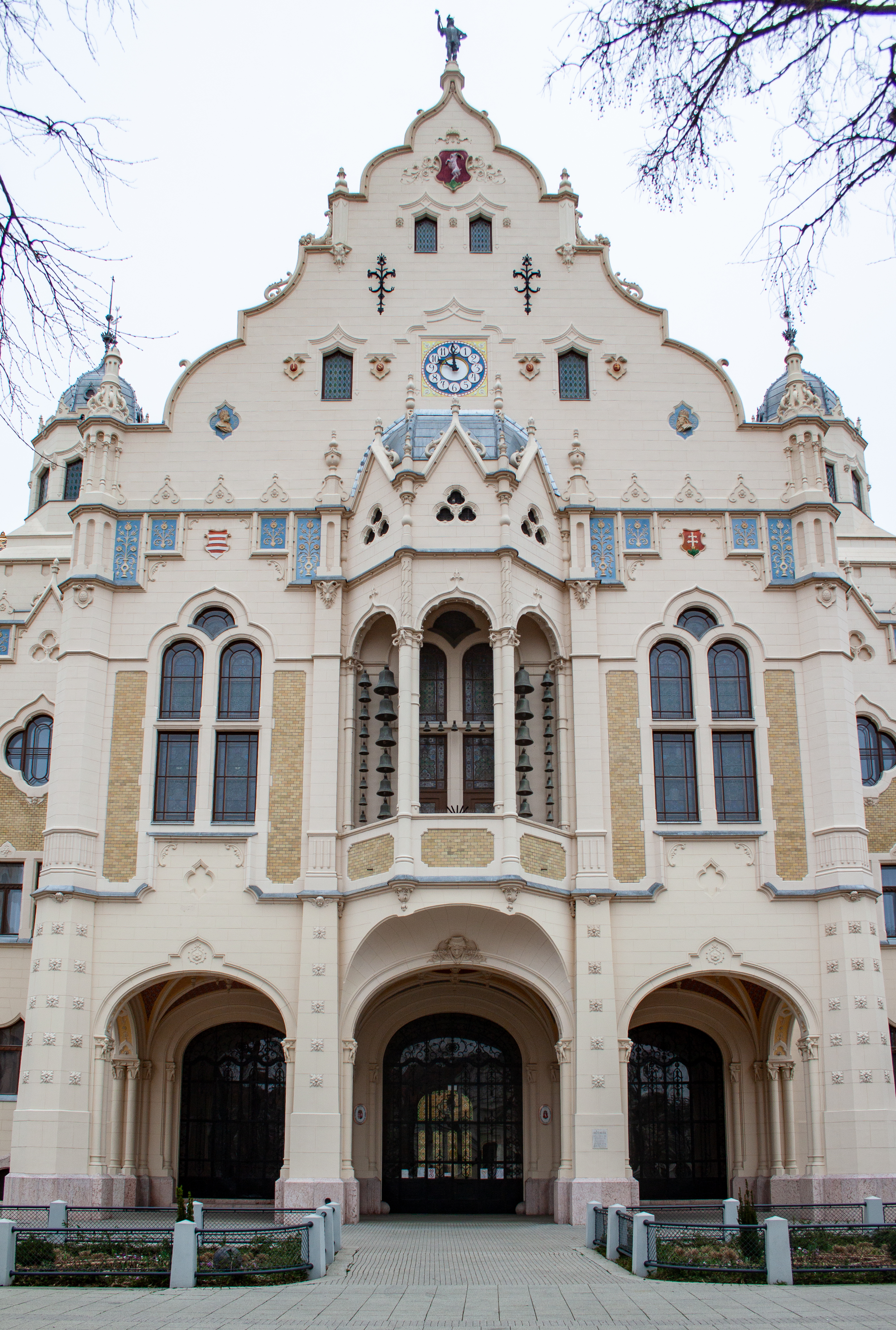
Entrance

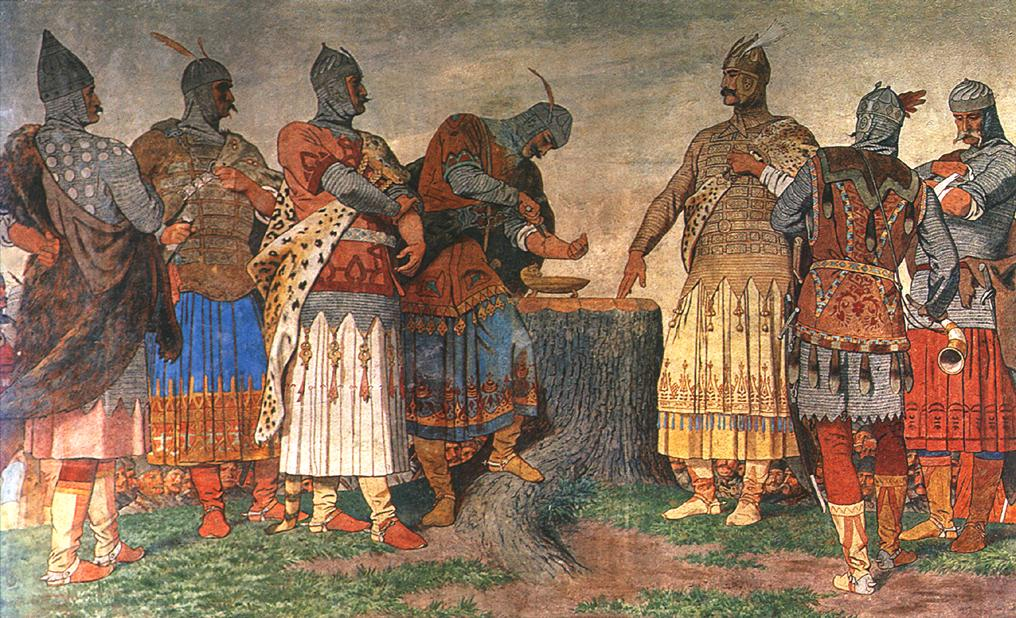
Representation of the blood oath on the fresco of Bertalan Székely located inside the city hall.

The statements of the art historian are not consistent in style. Some say Lechner was based on the early French Renaissance, others say English Renaissance architecture, and there are also opinions that its most influential cities were those of Upper Hungary and Zipser Germans. So it was practiced Renaissance architecture of Levoča. In any case, Lechner say that its aim was to create a Hungarian style. "There was no Hungarian form language, but it will be. Because it has to be. This conviction leads me to a running in life, whose sole purpose is to pave the way for the formation of the Hungarian formal language", he wrote in the Művészet Journal in 1906. Thus, although the basic structure is based on an early Renaissance style, the decoration of the façade, however, is accentuated by the wall coverings ceramics, rooted in Hungarian soil and using the motifs of Hungarian folk art. (Lechner was progressive on this issue because the ceramics are rather durable, riched in color and washable than the gypsum castings.

The building has four lesenes (narrow and flat vertical wall strip for partitioning the wall), its avant-corps in the main facade is highlighted, roughly rectangle.

The statue of the founder of the House, the prince Árpád was placed in the middle of its central rizal. The Kecskemét people, who were initially averse to the new town hall, called Árpád the Árpádka armor-plated warrior. Portraits in relief of Nikola IV Zrinski, Emeric Thököly, Matthias Corvinus, John Hunyadi, Stephen I of Hungary, Franz Joseph I of Austria are placed in the building. Outside and inside the building, are located the coats of arms of Kecskemét and Hungary.

=== Murals and frescoes ===
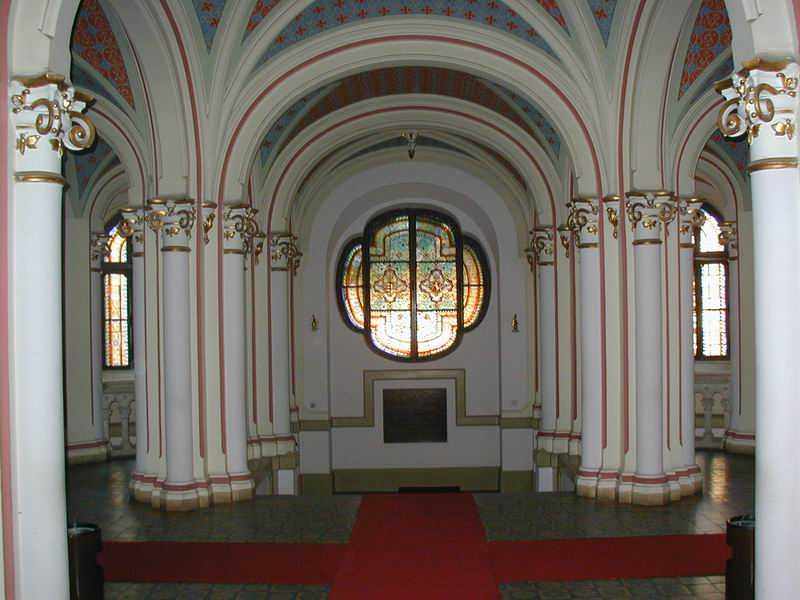
One of the corridors in the interior

The building of the City Hall houses the fresco made between 1895 and 1897 by Bertalan Székely. This was the last secular work of the artist. There were two main aspects that played a part in choosing the theme: join to Kecskemét and be worthy of celebrating the 1,000 years of existence of the country. After several suggestions, two frescoes were finally realized: one depicting the blood oath, the most important event of the Pusztaszer assembly. Seven chieftains of the Magyars is like a frieze, the picture has a fabulous feel. Another characteristic is the emphasis on drawing, the lack of plasticity. The second image is the Depicts the coronation of Franz Joseph I of Austria. Beside the figure of the king we can see the prince Gyula Andrássy and János Simor. The mural is a like portraits, emphasizing almost every character.

The plans of the two sequences of events, which were far away from each other, were not realized, and instead, the other two wall surfaces, divided by windows and doors, were depicted in the form of the great figures of our history. On the wall divided by the door to the left: a mural depicts István Széchenyi, Lajos Kossuth, Ferenc Deák; in the door wall to the right: a mural depicts Louis I of Hungary, John Hunyadi, Matthias Corvinus; on the wall to the left of the window: depicts Francis II Rákóczi, Gabriel Bethlen, Nikola IV Zrinski; on the wall to the right of the window: a mural depicts Coloman, King of Hungary, Ladislaus I of Hungary, Stephen I of Hungary.

On the 20th anniversary of Miklós Horthy, the General Assembly decided to make another mural. First it was entrusted to the Székelys Ferenc Márton (1884-1940). However, with the unexpected death of Márton, the mural was commissioned to Lajos Pándy. The painting had to be placed on the wall to the right of the entrance opposite the Presidential Stand. The painting was completed in 1944, depicting Horthy's entry into Kecskemét, adapted to Bertalan Székely painting style. After 1945 the painting was not tolerated in the Great Hall, it was only covered with paper at first, and 1959 was whitewashed. At that time, the "Blood Oath" was threatened with its destruction, but this was covered with canvas in time and survived.

The whitewashed mural of Miklós Horthy in Kecskemét was restored in 2014, can be viewed in the ballroom.

== Gallery ==
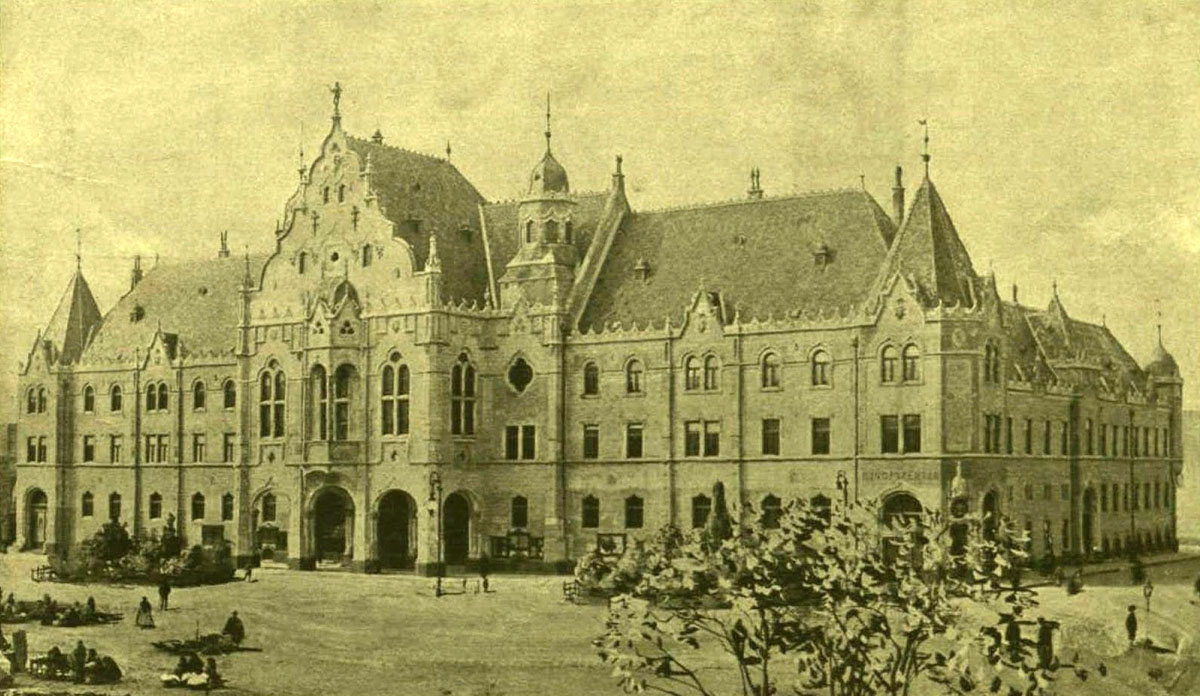
Old painting of the building

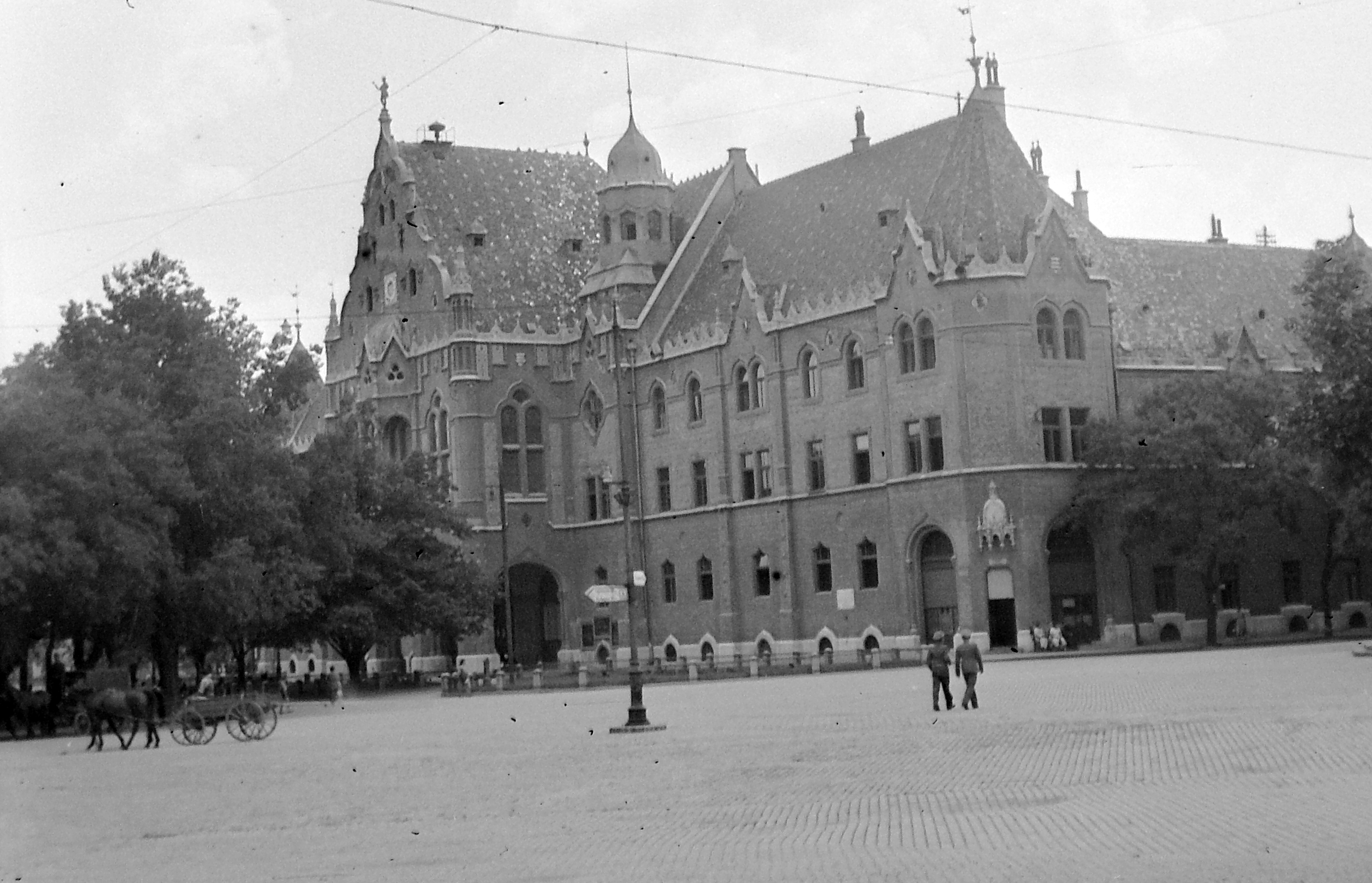
Photo of 1955 of the City Hall

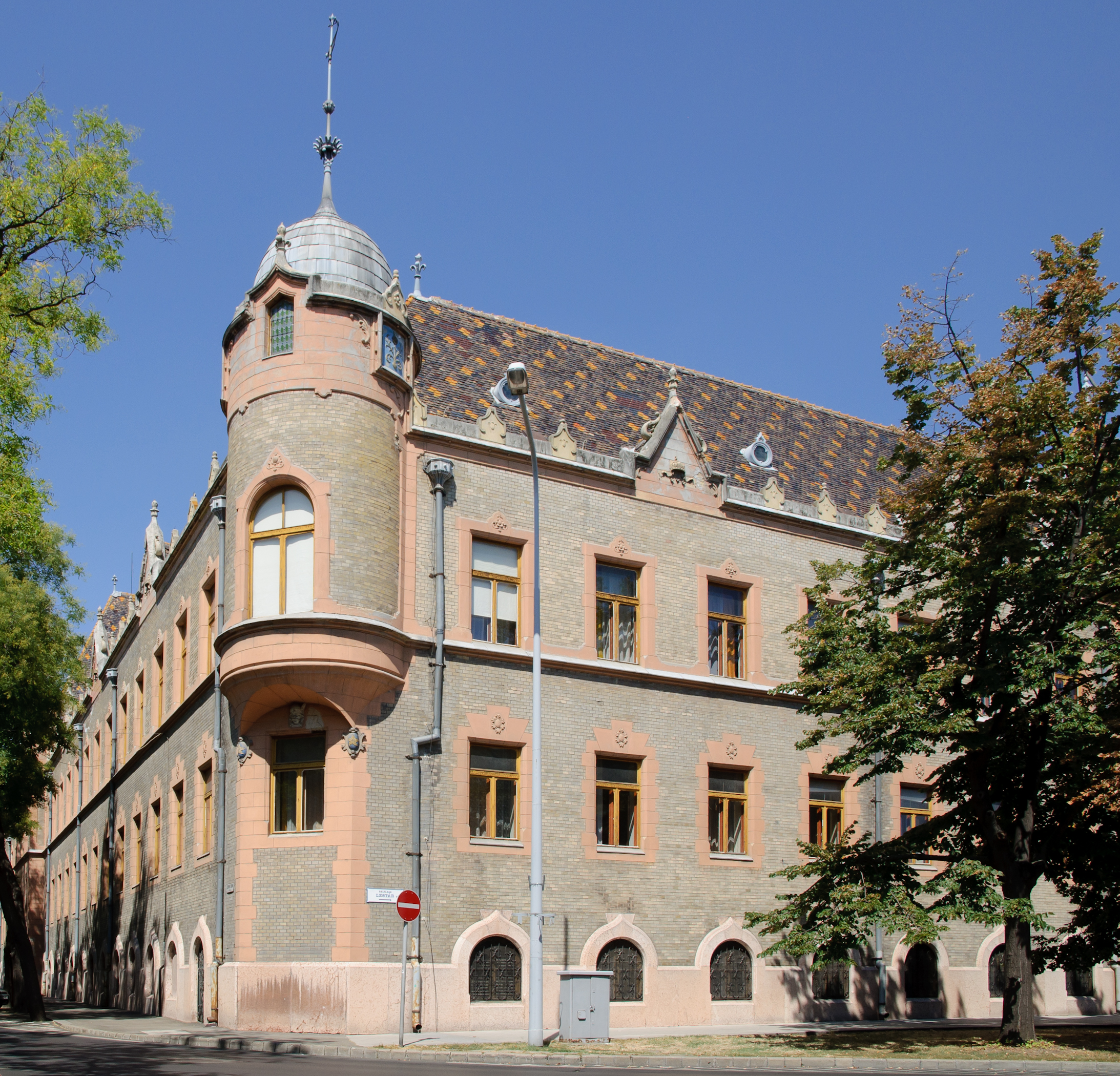
A rear corner

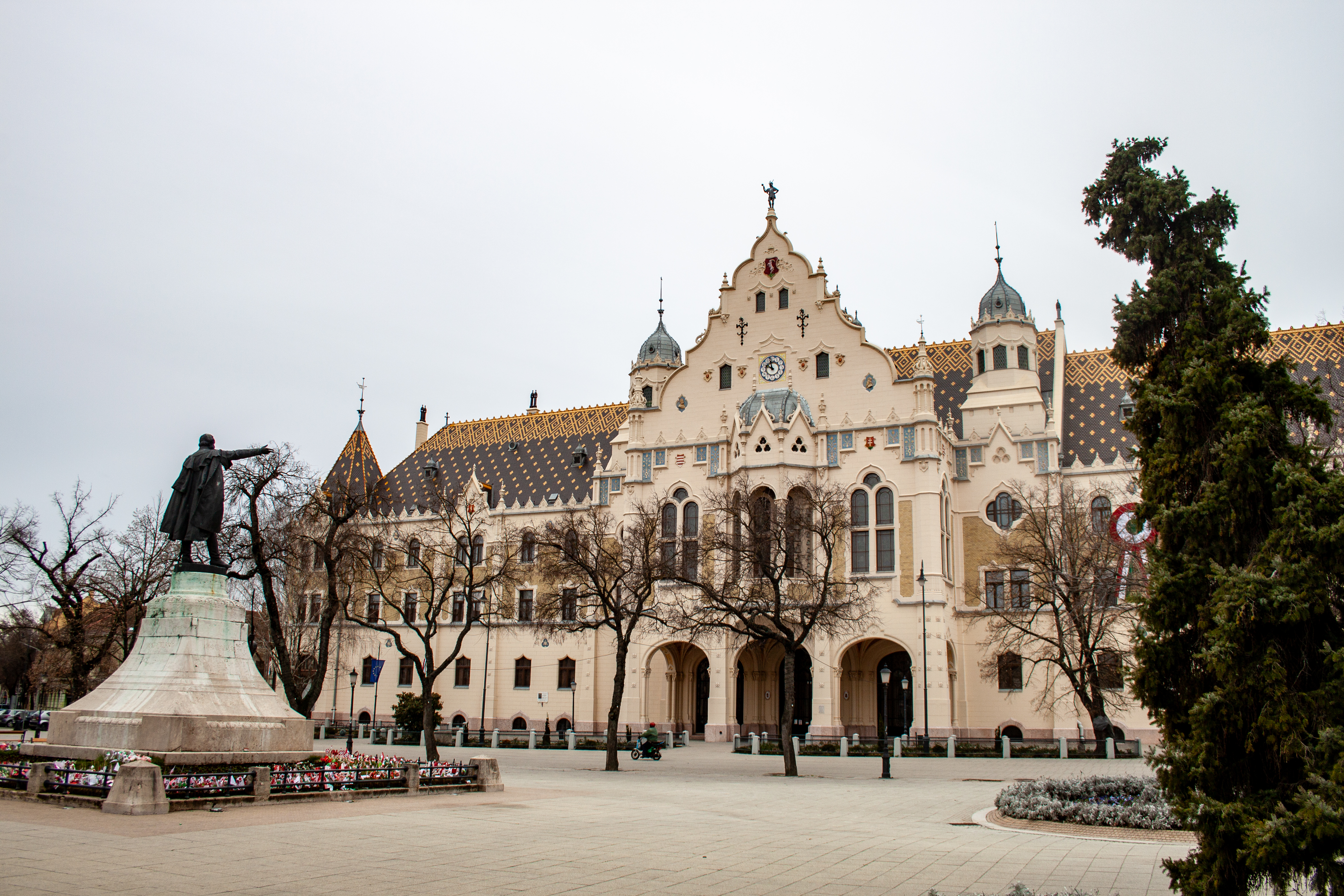
Exterior

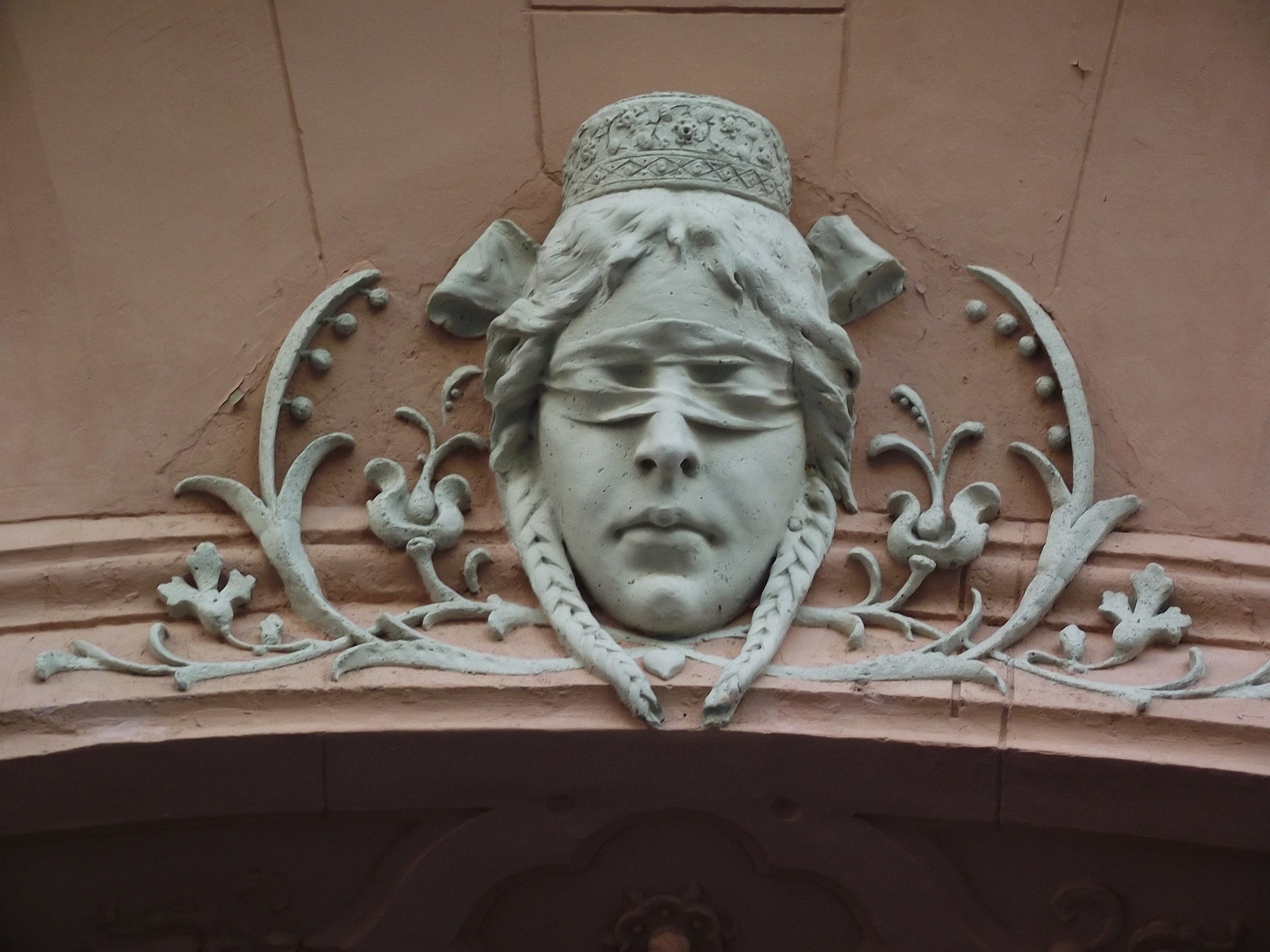
Detail in the facade

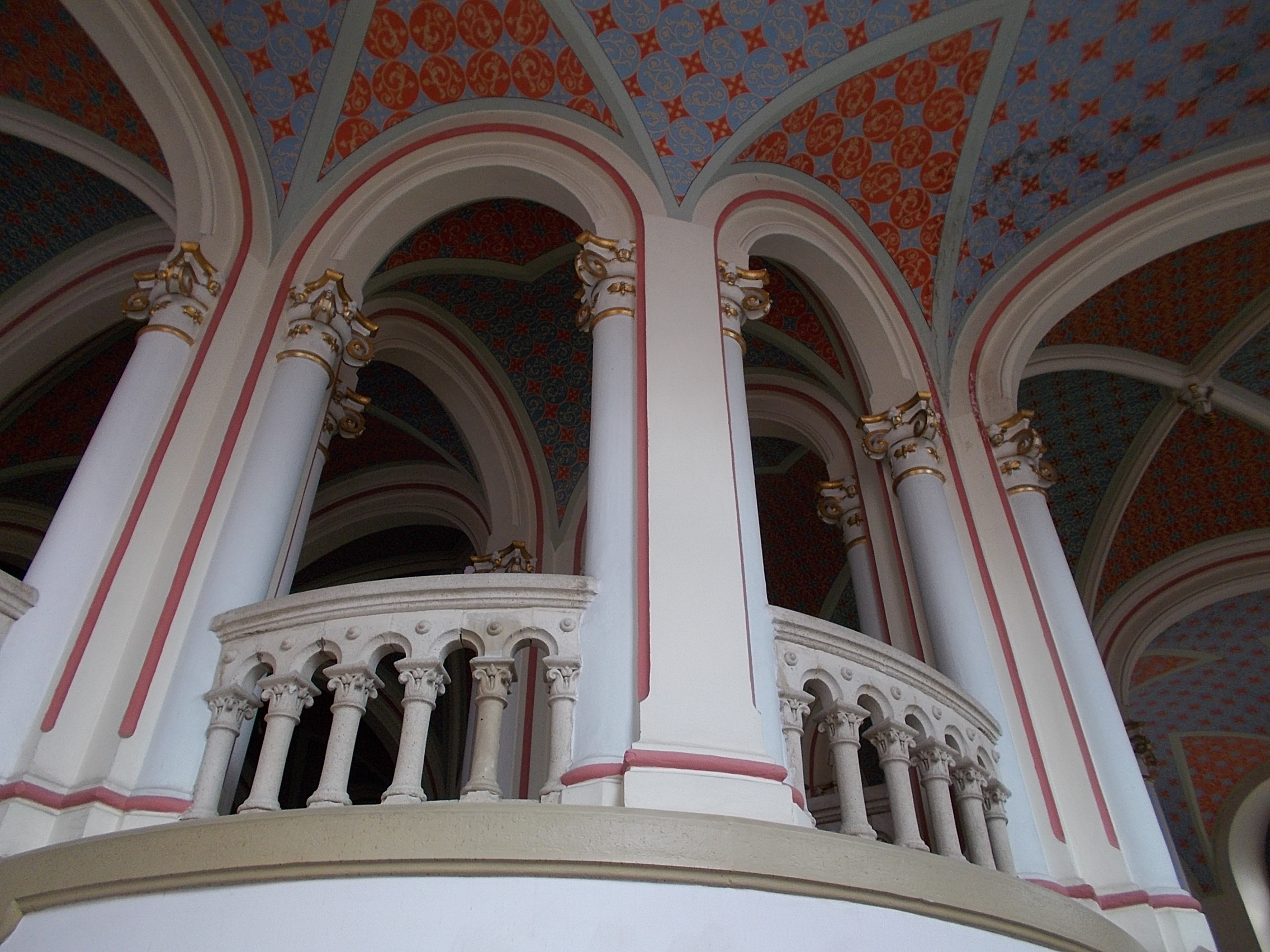
Columns
