= Miklós Radnai =

Hungarian composer, critic and music writer

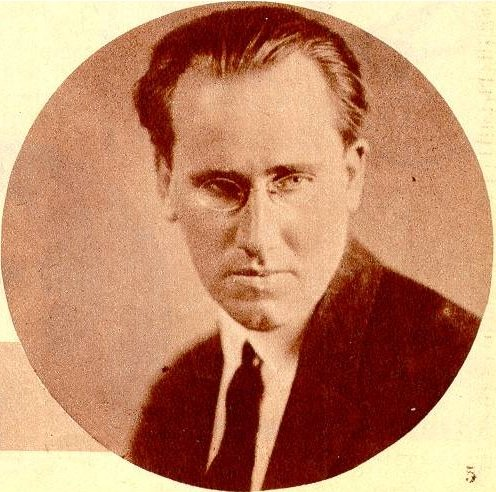
Miklós Radnai

Miklós Radnai (1 January 1892 – 4 November 1935) was a Hungarian composer, critic and music writer. From 1925 to his death in 1935, he was a noted Intendant of the Hungarian Royal Opera House in Budapest.

== Biography ==
At an early age he had lessons with the blind pianist Attila Horváth, and also studied the violin. While still in secondary school, he entered the Academy of Music in Budapest, where he studied under János Koessler and Viktor Herzfeld. He taught theory at another music school, and had an extended tour of European countries. In 1919 he became a teacher at the Academy of Music.

In 1924, with some associated artists, he gave a performance of his own works, including his Violin Sonata, Poems for piano, and songs. In 1925 he became director of the Hungarian Royal Opera House, the youngest director since Gustav Mahler. He restored the institution's artistic reputation that had deteriorated during and after World War I, and put its financial affairs on a sound footing. His first venture was to stage the Hungarian premiere of Claude Debussy's Pelléas et Mélisande. These were followed by the Hungarian premieres, mostly shortly after their world premieres, of Stravinsky's Oedipus rex, Puccini's Turandot, Milhaud's "three-minute" operas, Hindemith's Hin und zurück, Malipiero's Il finto Arlecchino (from his trilogy Il mistero di Venezia), and others. His administration of the Opera House was criticised not only for being too conservative and reactionary, but also for being too adventurous with new works. He introduced 17 stage works by Hungarian composers during his ten-year tenure. He also created a museum for the Opera House, containing fine art objects and historical documents.

He was also the music critic for two daily newspapers. He contributed to periodicals and wrote analyses of operas and the Hungarian repertoire, and he wrote text books on harmony.

The Opera House celebrated its 50th anniversary in 1935. He died suddenly the following year, aged only 43.

Radnai belongs to the Hungarian post-romantic school, and there are few examples of any Hungarian national elements in his music, a major exception being his choral work Symphony of the Magyars. His harmonic language was mainly influenced by turn-of-the-century French and Italian idioms. He had a strong feel for orchestral colouring, and used impressionist techniques.

== Works ==
=== Opera ===
- Gold (Andor Kozma, 1911)
- Lovers of Yore (aka The Former Lovers), Op. 22 (after János Arany, 1918–21)

=== Ballet ===
- The Birthday of the Infanta (Oscar Wilde, 1918)

=== Choral ===
- Symphony of the Magyars (solo voices, chorus and orchestra, ? 1923)

=== Orchestral ===
- Suite symphonique (1912)
- Fairy Tale (1915)
- Five Poems, suite, Op. 26 (1925)
- Rhapsody (? 1932)
- Mosaïque, suite for small orchestra

=== Concertante ===
- Orkan the Hero (aka Knight Gale, Heroic Chapters), tenor and orchestra, Op. 17 (1917)
- Violin Concerto (1933)

=== Chamber ===
- Piano Trio (1912)
- Cello Sonata in B flat major, Op. 2 (1912)
- Divertimento for string quartet, Op. 7
- Viola Sonata in D minor (1913)
- Violin Sonata, Op. 21 (1922)

=== Piano ===
- In the Village, 6 pieces (1916)
- Times of War, 6 pieces (1916)
- Summer Pictures, 6 pieces (1916)
- Deux Valses Caprices (1916)
- Trois Morceaux (1916; Arabesque, Idyll, Burlesque)
- Ballroom Scenes, Op. 16
- Deux Sonatines, Op, 17 (1922)
- Fünf Klavierstücke (1st series), Op. 25 (1922)
- Fünf Klavierstücke (2nd series), Op. 26 (1922)

=== Songs ===
- Songs (1911)
- 4 songs, 2 vols, Op. 15 (1920)
- 5 Transylvanian Folksongs, Op. 23 (for girls’ voices; 1922)
- 5 Transylvanian Folksongs, Op. 24 (for boys’ voices; 1922)
- Burning I am (Endre Ady)

== Sources ==
- Eric Blom ed., Grove's Dictionary of Music and Musicians, 5th ed. 1954
