= Architecture of Hungary =

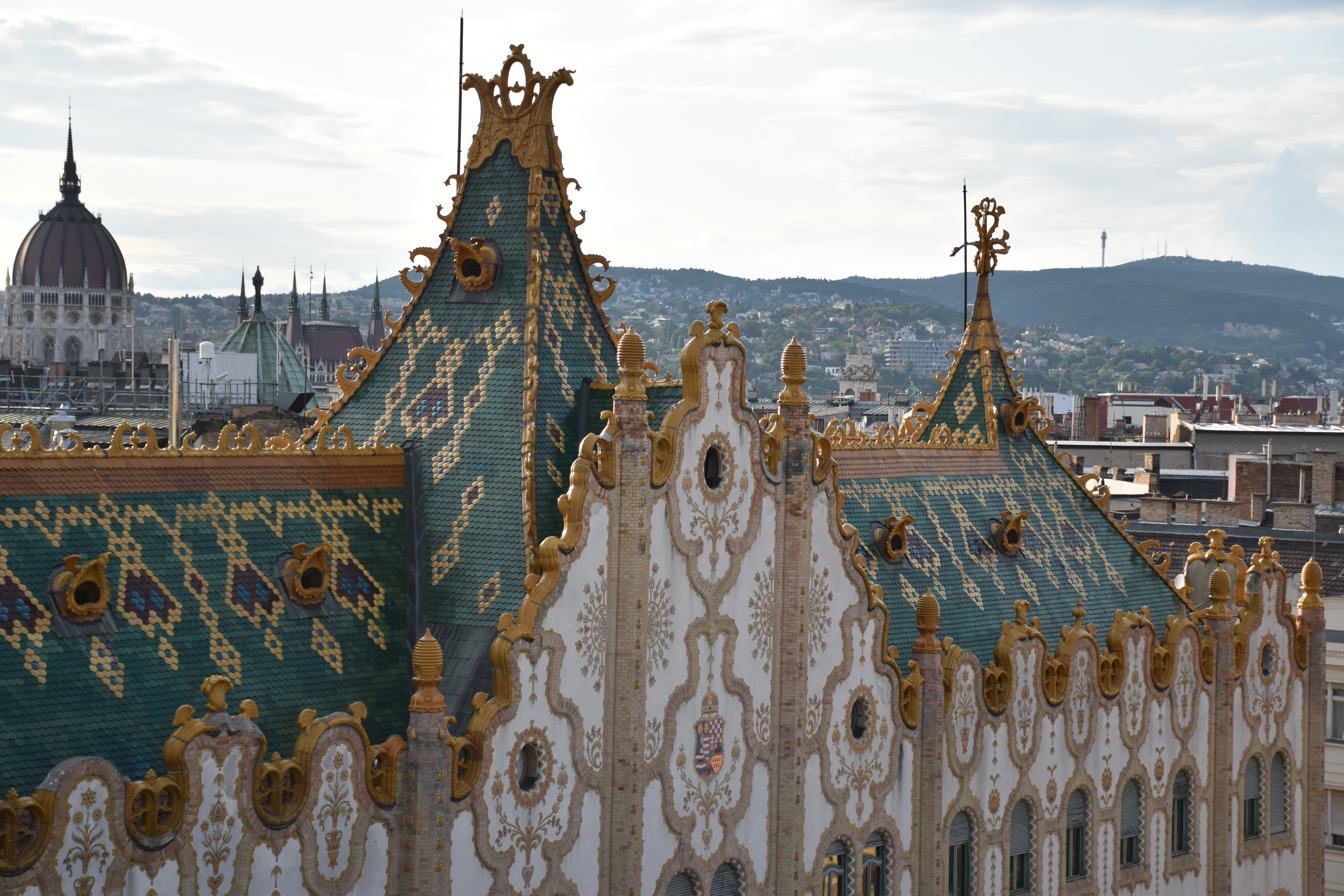
Roof of the Hungarian Treasury Building in Budapest

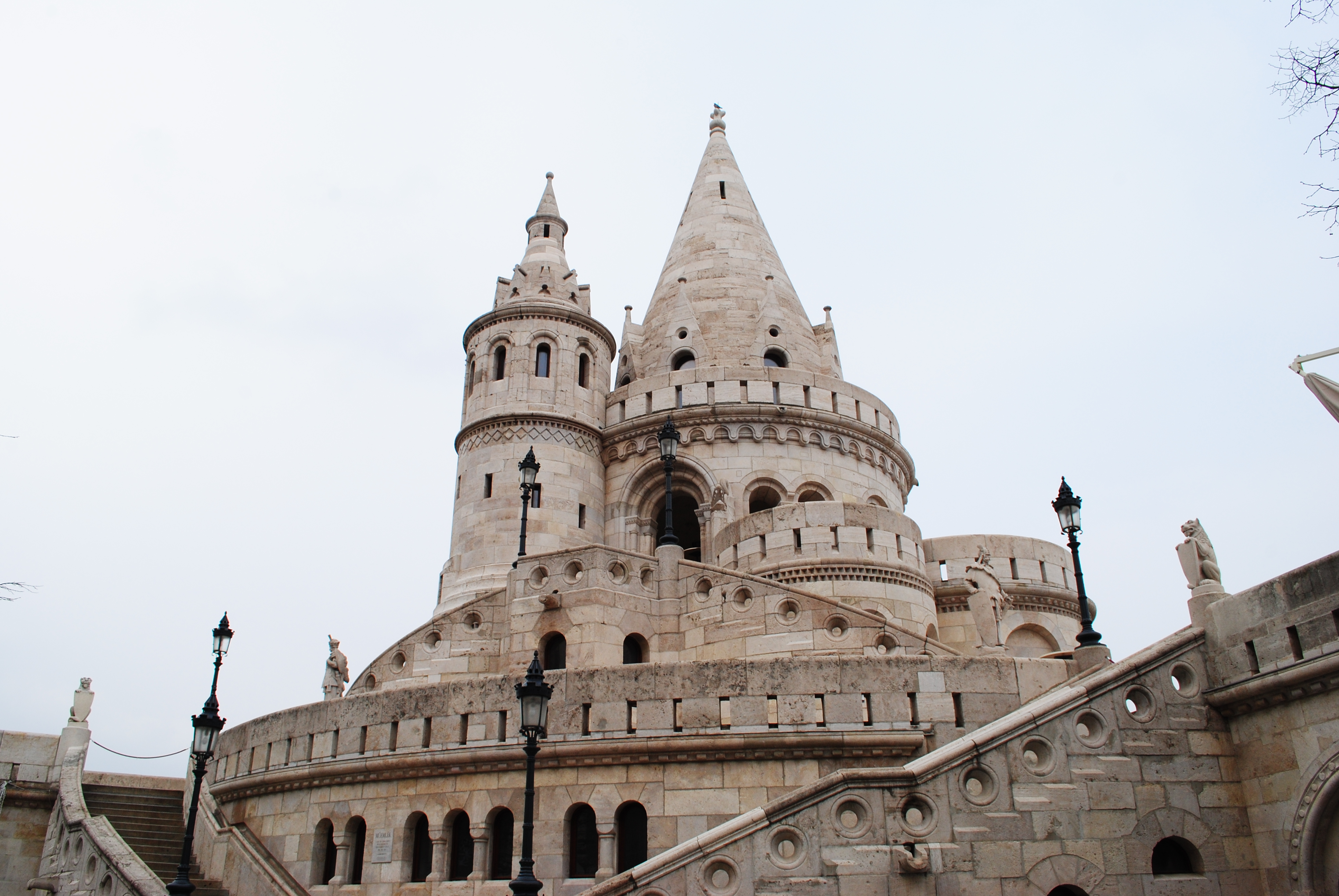
Fisherman’s Bastion in Budapest

The architecture of Hungary is understood as the architecture of the territory of Hungary, and in a wider sense the historical territory of the Kingdom of Hungary. Architecture in Hungary reflects historical influences from foreign occupation, notably by the Habsburg, Ottoman and Soviet empires. Major architectural styles represented include Romanesque, Gothic and Renaissance from the medieval period, Ottoman, Baroque and Classical from the early modern period, Art Noveau from the late modern period, and Soviet from the mid-to-late 20th century.

Characteristic of vernacular architecture in rural Hungary is the use of adobe, brick and timber in construction, and tiled or thatched roofs, often featuring carved woodwork and folk motifs. Architectural features preserved in vernacular tradition have been reinterpreted in public architecture, by the likes of Ödön Lechner, Imre Makovecz and Karóly Kós, often drawing on folk heritage and historical connections to the broader Eurasian-Steppe and Central Asia.

== In the time of the foundation of the country ==
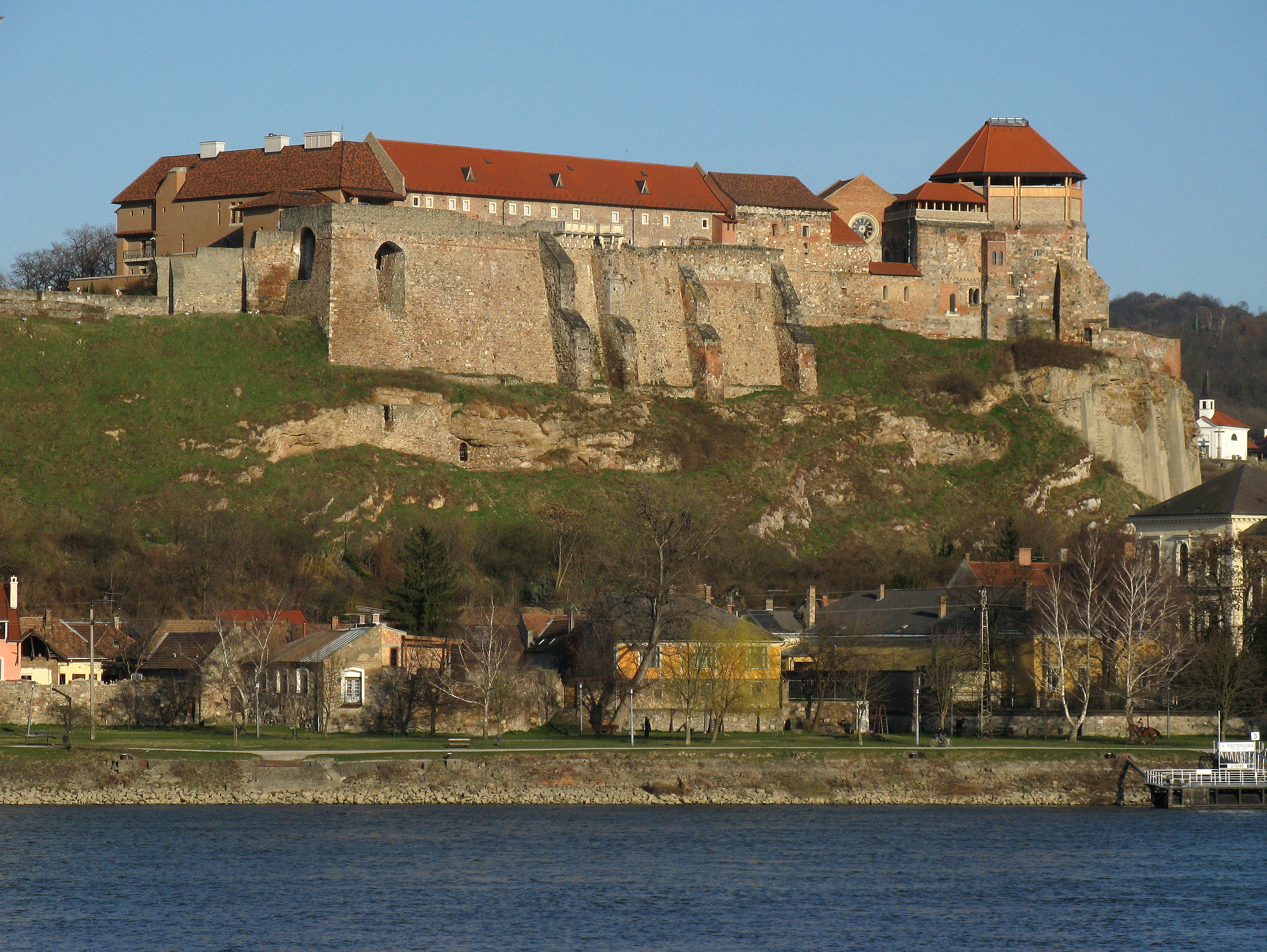
The Castle of Esztergom built in the 10th century.

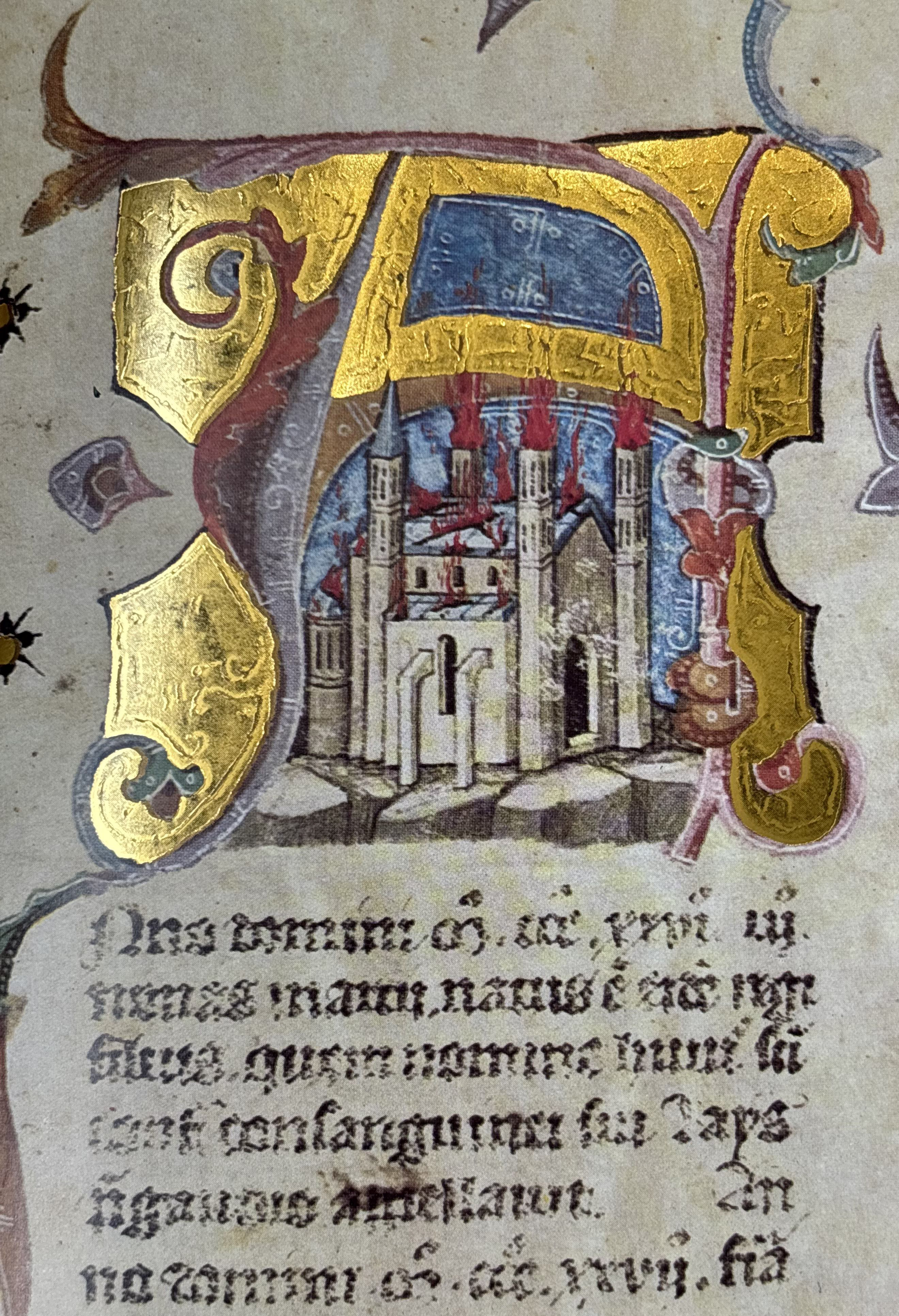
The burning of the Székesfehérvár Basilica depicted in the 14th-century's Chronicon Pictum.

The Hungarian conquest of the Carpathian Basin by the Hungarians settled an architectural history in the country. The roads and cities of the Roman province were not completely destroyed by the Migration Period but rather new settlements were created on them. The Roman buildings were used as mines and mansions (for example, the Kurszán Castle in Óbuda). Those churches of the Slavic peoples that were converted to the Christian faith survived, as did that of Zalavár.

King Stephen I of Hungary, with the creation of a feudal state required the construction of monumental stone buildings. This demand was initially in charge to servants, craftsmen abducted from the West, and then by craftsmen, masons and Italian stone carvers. The First Church of Kalocsa with its three-nave basilical arrangement and its apse pointed to Italian models, to the earliest Christian Ravenna influences. It also includes the Basilica of the Assumption of Székesfehérvár, one of the largest churches of Europe in its time, founded by the King Stephen I of Hungary, which later became the administrative center, coronation church and traditional royal burial ground of the Hungarian Kingdom.

Smaller churches like the Pécsvárad Abbey and the excavatede remains of the Tihany Abbey also have an Italian influence. The base walls of the crypt of the Feldebrő Church are from the Eastern, perhaps a Byzantine practice. The strengthening of feudalism created new opportunities. During the reconstruction of the Pécs Cathedral, was formed the basilica of the Hungarian Romanesque style, the three-nave basilica, without transept, with a semicircular apse. The carved stone is from the Lombard effect through Dalmatia. This floor plan system remained almost unchanged until 11th and 12th centuries, but the tower pairs arrangements were not followed in Pécs. The towers first adorned the western façade, and a few decades later only the eastern façade.

== In the Árpádian's age ==
=== Béla III of Hungary's age ===
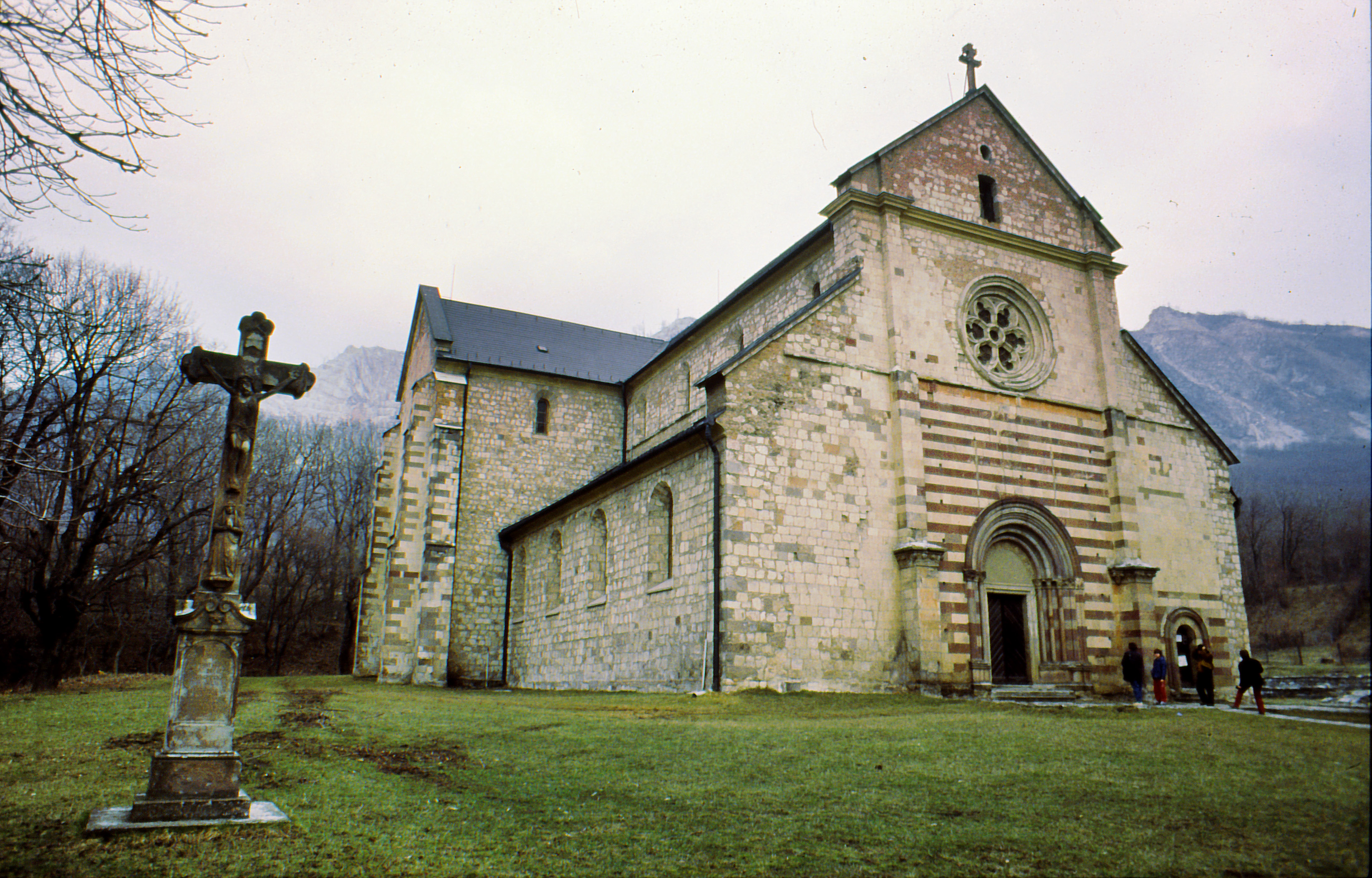
The Romanesque Cistercian abbey of Bélapátfalva.

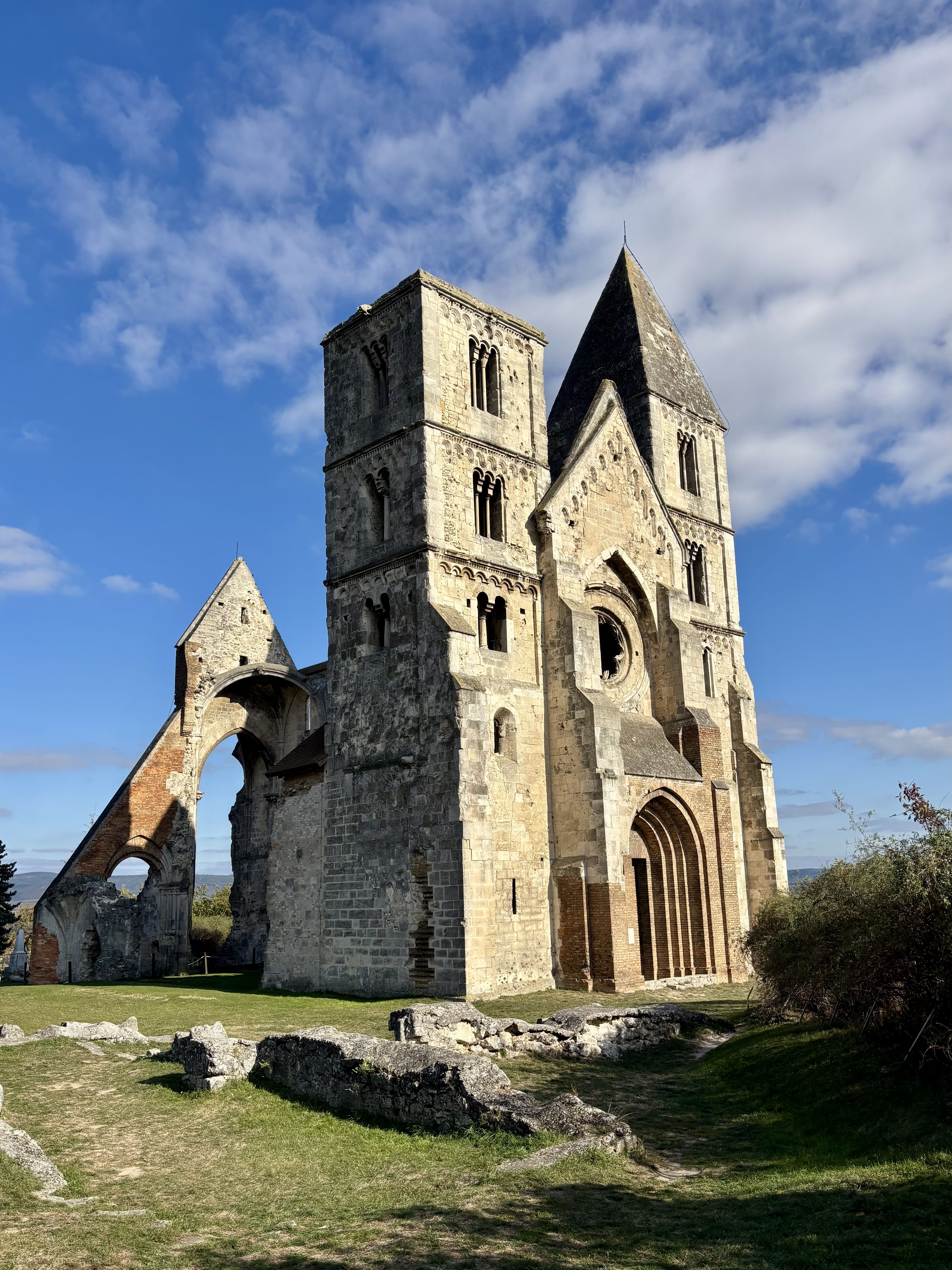
The remains of the Premontre monastery church of Zsámbék, built between 1220 and 1235.

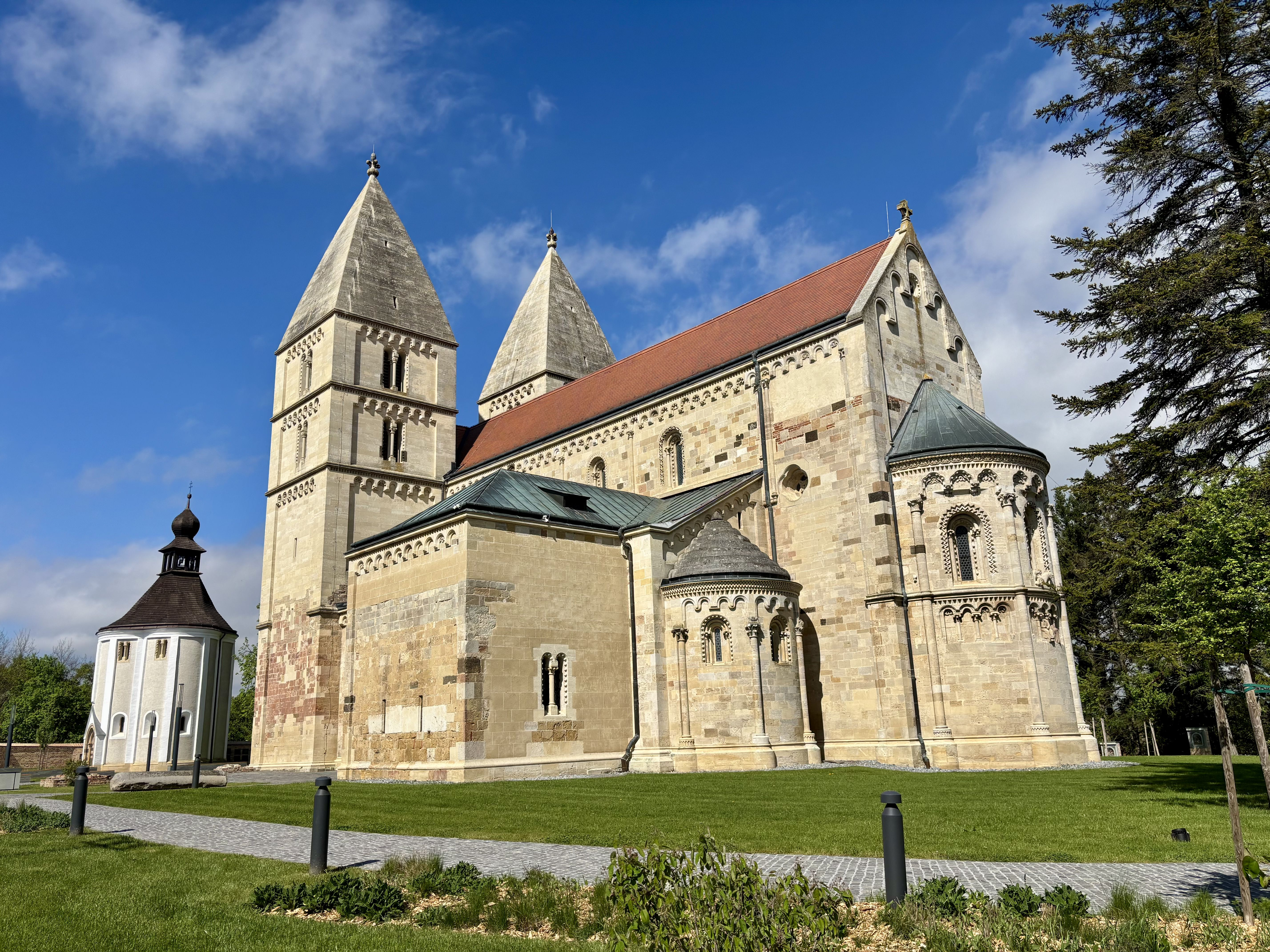
Considered the most beautiful Romanesque church in Hungary, the Abbey of St. George in Ják was built between 1220 and 1256.

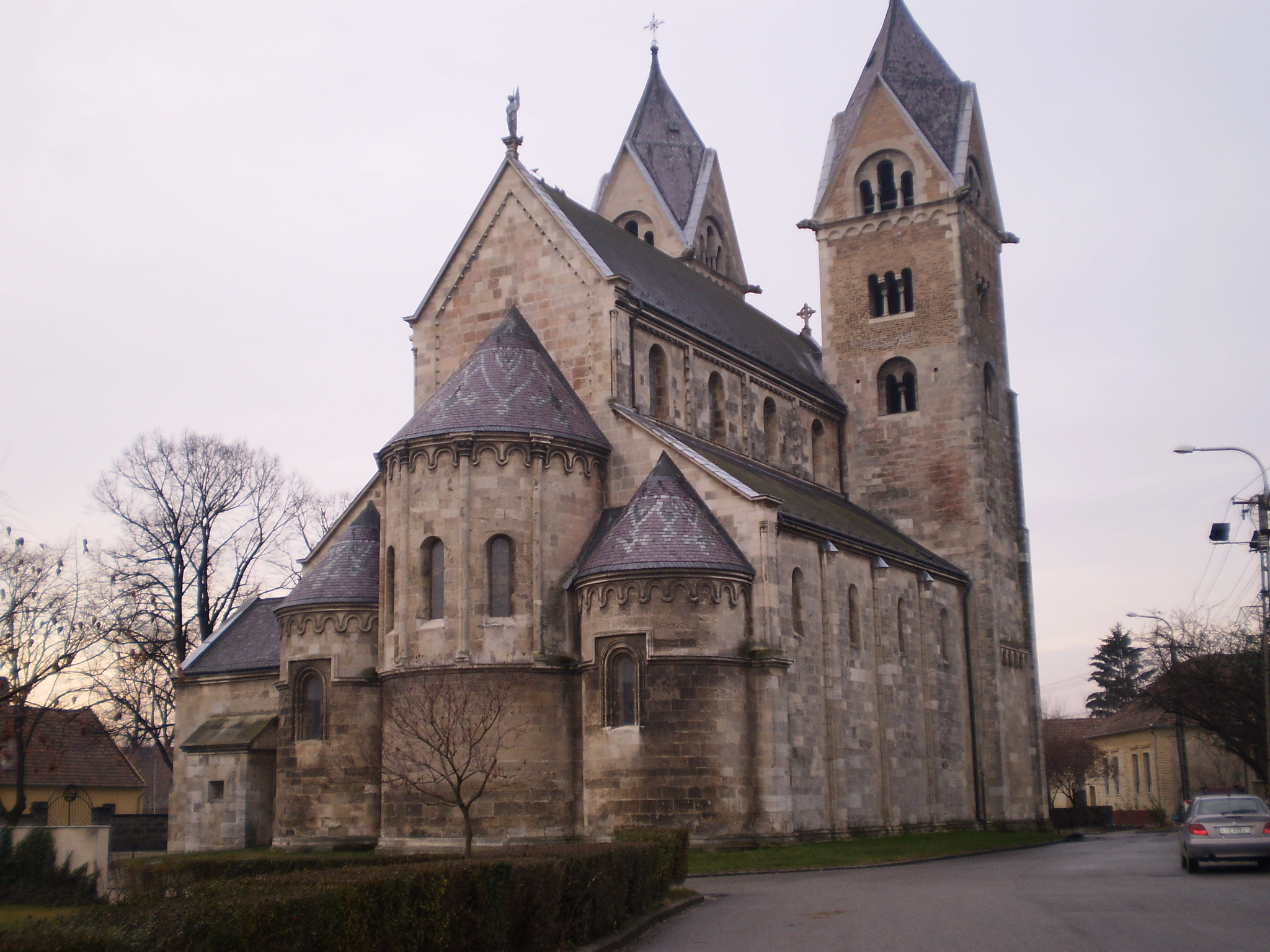
The Abbey of St. James in Lébény, built in the early-13th century.

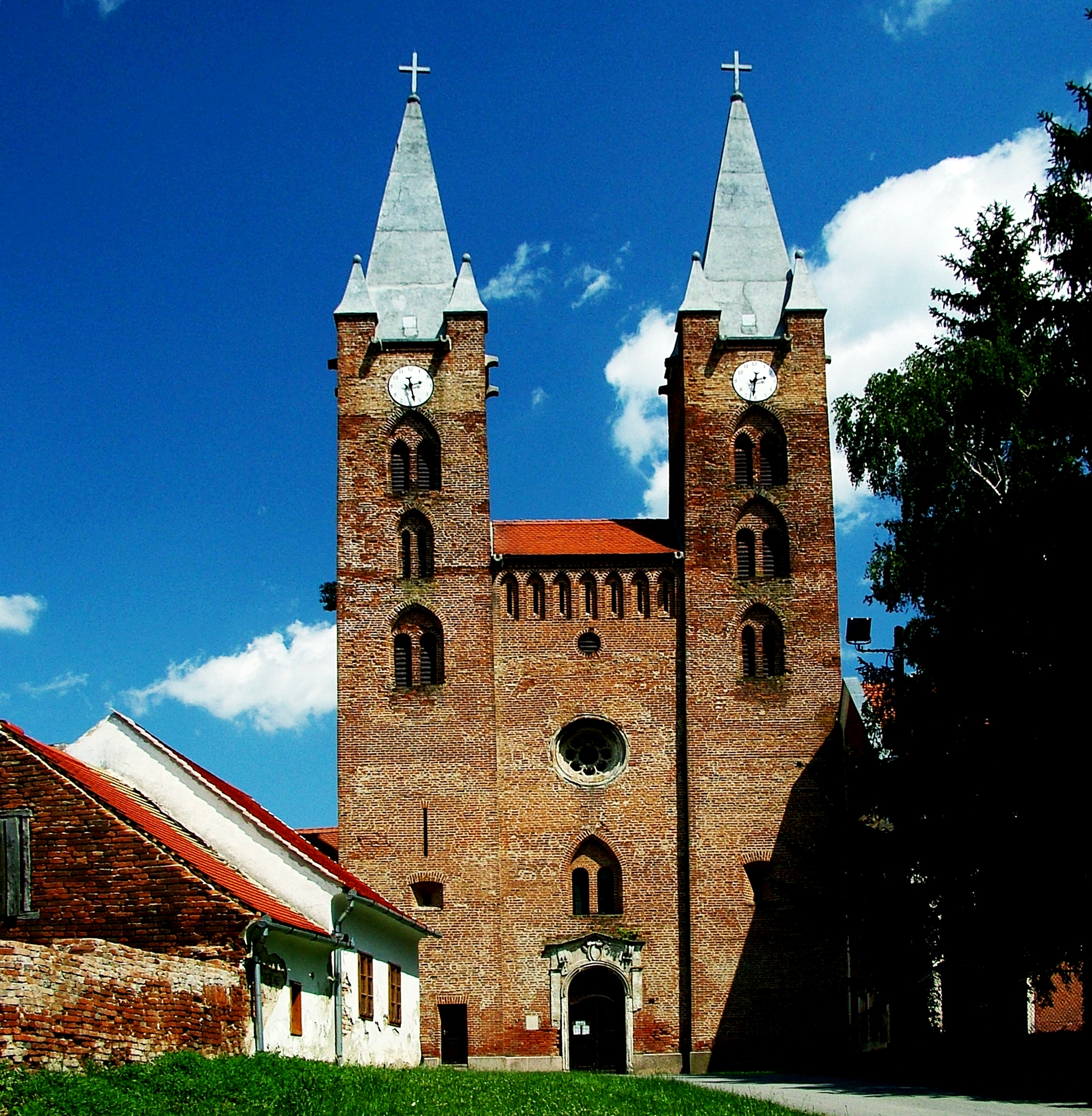
Premontre church of Türje built in the 13th century, was part of a monastery.

The resulting uniformity was replaced by a more complex art in the time of king Béla III of Hungary. By the time of Byzantine king, was expected to have a major French influence alongside the Byzantine. This was more evident in Esztergom, where he wanted to create a center similar to Constantinople with the unity of the secular and ecclesiastical architecture. The St. Adalbert's Cathedral and the palace of Esztergom, burned in 1181, were the first example of this. The Archbishop Jób built a magnificent temple, a royal palace south of the cathedral, and a chapel. Although Béla III did not realize his plan, the building just finished was delivered to the archbishop. However, the Székesfehérvár's construction works at that time continued to follow the pattern of Pécs. The mixing style developed in Esztergom was manifested in many ways in the early 13th century. The type of door became especially popular, as shown by the southern door of the Cathedral of Alba Iulia, current Romania. The individual details also spread like the head of a rotating blade in the Premontre monastery of Ócsa. The Rite of Esztergom is most clearly shown in the Reformed Church in Kisbény.

==== Effect of the Cistercians ====
Following the French relations of Esztergom, the Cistercian order appeared in the Kingdom of Hungary. The system brought with it a strong arts program, including the prohibition of figurative sculptures, mural paintings and the construction of the towers, toward the contemporary of Burgundy when the Gothic was applied. The order was first established in Eger in 1142. They were conquered during the reign of Béla III, who enjoyed the same privileges as on French soil. Only the fragments of the churches of the Zirc Abbey and Pilis Abbey that were formed at that time and the Cistercian abbey of Bélapátfalva have survived, but in the end they remained almost intact after the Mongol invasion. The Cistercian influence is also reflected in the lower church of the Pannonhalma Archabbey, founded during the reign of Grand Prince Géza, and in this style was built the Royal Castle of Óbuda.

==== Impact of the Premonstratensians ====
According to tradition, the first monastery of the Premonstratensian canons in Hungary was founded in 1130 in Váradelőhegy (near present-day Oradea) and its presence before 1135 is demonstrated by documents. The Árpád age Provost 39 was created, including Adony, Csorna, Hatvan, Kaposfő, Majk, Türje, the Nyulak Island (today Margaret Island of Budapest) and Zsámbék and the Female Santiago Apostle monastery of Mórichida also worked in Somlóvásárhely and Szeged. The monks outside the monastic and pastoral life dealt with place of authentication activities, assumed an important role in the manuscript culture dissemination in Hungary. During the Turkish occupation, the domestic operation of the Premontre Order almost ceased. Its properties became property of the Austrian provinces in the 18th century.

=== National monasteries ===
The 13th century also wanted to express its consciousness in the construction of a layer of land, which had grown strong by the end of the century. In the centre of their estates, churches serving as burial places were built, usually with a small number of monasteries. The first national monastery was built in the 11th century, but the building type has a flowering age of the 13th century. Its basic form is the three-nave system established at the Pécs Cathedral, which is closed by semi circle apse, but the location of the towers varies. In Boldva had a tower pair with an eastern orientation, but in Acâș (current Romania) has already abandoned its eastern construction and built a Western one. In the inner space, there is always a room for the Lord's choir. The most mature memories of the National monasteries -forming a School- remained in Transdanubia. First the Abbey church of St. James in Lébény was built in 1208, then the Abbey church of St George of Ják in 1220. The construction was interrupted by the Mongol invasion. The type is followed by the Premonstratensian church of Türje, the Premontre monastery of Ócsa, the Arača in current Serbia, the Sopronhorpács Parochial Church, the Premontre monastery church of Zsámbék and the Upper castle church of Felsőörs. The church of Zsámbék it already shows Gothic marks in its form.

The clerical churches were built in a more modest version. According to St. Stephen's law on the construction of ten churches, the villages were united. However, their temples were not made of durable material, but made of wood, apothecary, cane. On the basis of these churches we know the center of the villages, because the law also stipulated that the village should not be away from the church (such as Himesháza or Kiskunfélegyháza). Between the remaining churches, there are also central and long-term types. Common on the outside with a circular wall, on the inside with a pearly solution (Горяни in current Ukraine, Karcsa, Pápoc). This purely circular layout was just a solution to cemetery treatments. There's not much to know about secular architecture at this age. The place of residence must have been a tent or a wooden house, the stone house only appears as a rarity. We don't know much about the castle building either. The chronicler Anonymus refers to hillforts with elements of Slavic origin, fortifications made of twigs and mud. The tower of Esztergom, which formed the core of the castle, suggests that this type of building has already appeared.

=== Appearance of the Gothic ===
From the second half of the 13th century a new layer of society appeared as the customer of art works, the citizenship. The art of the citizenship came into contact with the art of Royal centers in many ways. Since the law of the king Béla IV of Hungary, the protection of the urban settlement by the king Béla IV, has been erected by a stone wall, built towers and gates. In addition to the ecclesiastical art, significant secular art was developed (residential houses, wells, roads). Urban craftsmen did not affect the architecture of the houses. Building houses and castles became an independent artistic task, and the Gothic art was developing. It played an important role in the development of Gothic architecture. After the law of Béla IV, a massive construction began. Béla IV began the construction of the new Royal headquarters, Buda. Although the Royal Centre had already been transferred to Óbuda, the site was considered to be warlike and construction began on the South Side of the Castle Hill. At that time, the construction of Buda was still at a modest level, the main aspect was of protection. In addition to the castle, a town was established on the north side. The King's construction works include The Franciás Boldogasszony and the simpler Church of Mary Magdalene of Budapest, the Dominican Monastery of St. Nicholas, Buda and the monastery of the Dominican Monastery of Margaret Island. In these buildings, the ribcage cross-vault has already appeared.

Construction was carried out all over the country (Lower Castle of Visegrád, the Tower of Solomon, the tower of Sárospatak, etc.). King Béla IV made donations to the wealthy leaders and encouraged them to do the same. The militars and bishops were almost competing in construction. The central tower of these castles was built on steep rock or gully, to which additional rooms, walls and gates were connected according to the terrain. The courtyard was narrow, here cisterns and wells provided the water. The huge old towers were usually gloomy, only the most modest demands were met (Castle of Csesznek, Castle of Sümeg, Castle of Trenčín (the latter in current Slovakia)).

=== Popular architecture ===
The development of cities started in the 13th century. Sources of the same age present Sopron, Buda and Esztergom as a townships. In these cities you can feel the radiance of the Buda architecture, like the sanctuary of the Franciscan Church of Sopron and the extension of the sanctuary of the Alba Iulia (the latter in current Romania). The Anjou era Gothic art is based on these.

== Anjou and Sigismund's eras ==
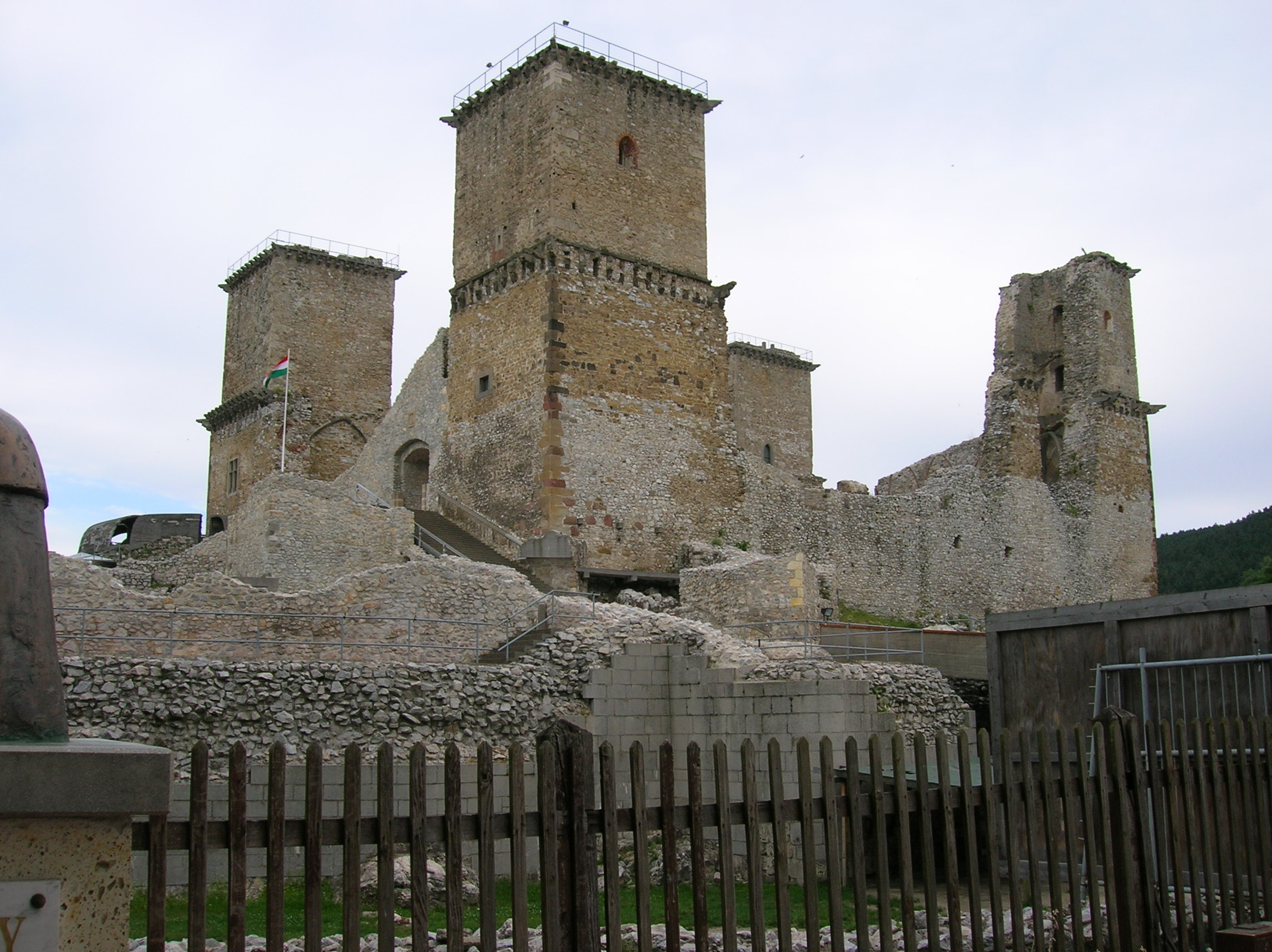
The Castle of Diósgyőr

The Anjou kings cast the foundations of the Visegrád's Citadel and the Royal palace. At the same time, the construction of the Buda Castle was going on, and at the age of king Louis I of Hungary, the foundations of the today's Buda Castle were already in place (Tower of Stephen). After Sigismund, Holy Roman Emperor took the throne, a direct connection established the Fresh Palace construction with the royal centre in Prague. Sigismund built the new wing of the Fresh Palace and the Tower of Bones rising from the city.

It was the Golden Age of the Gothic architecture in Hungary. The Castle of Diósgyőr built during the reign of Louis I of Hungary is the earliest creation of the typical four-corner tower rectangular castle type. Examples of this type are also the Royal castle of Tata and the Sigismund's era's Bratislava Castle (current Slovakia). In addition to the royal castle architecture, there was also a significant place in the castle architecture of the Lord. There were ribbed cross-vices, varied forms of windows and doors. Castle gates with family coats of arms, towers with fireplaces. The best examples are from the Upper Hungary: Trenčín Castle, the Matthew III Csák's castle; Beckov Castle, the Stibor family castle; Castle of Hollókő. Kačić family clan; Castle of Nógrád, the Bishop of Vác's castle; in addition, the surrounding area of Veszprém (the Garai family's Castle of Csesznek, the Bishop's castle of Veszprém) and the Great Hungarian Plain is significant (Gyula, Castle of Kisvárda the Stephen Várdai's castle). The Jurisics Castle and the Castle of Siklós belonged to the Garai family. The Hunyadi Castle is the most magnificent creation of the period.

=== Early Gothic church architecture ===
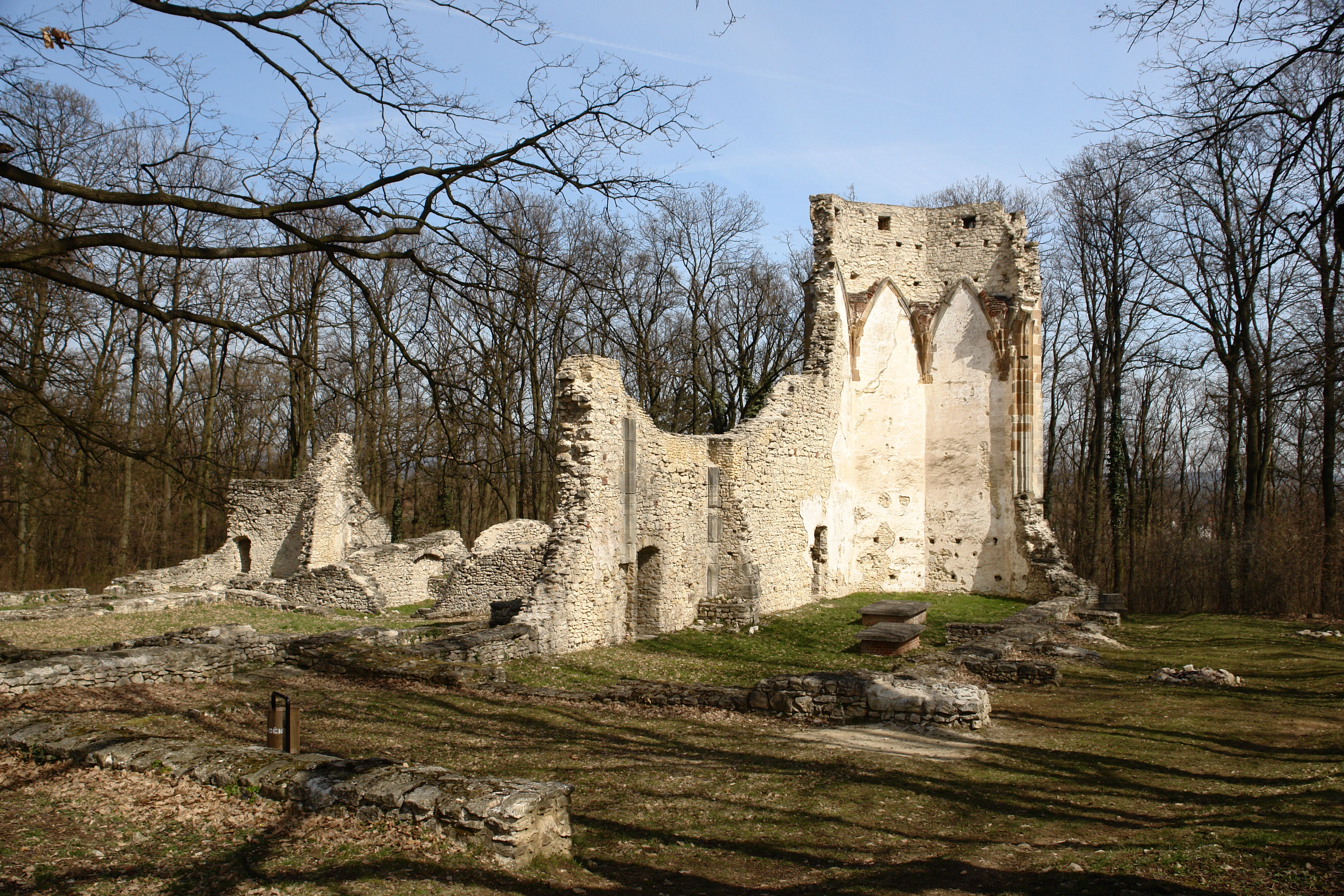
Ruins of the Pauline monastery of Nagyvázsony

During the 14th and 15th centuries almost all the Episcopal cathedrals were enlarged or rebuilt in the century (Chapel of Gisela in Veszprém, Chapel of Hédervár in Győr, surrounding sanctuary in Eger). In the countryside, the overlords built Monk and parish churches. The Franciscan monastery of Szécsény was built by Thomas Szécsényi. John Hunyadi built the Franciscan church of Teiuș (current Romania), Pál Kinizsi founded the Pauline monastery of Nagyvázsony, and the Báthory family were active in Nyírbátor. There was also the type of the creation church, the preface of which is the Sainte-Chapelle of Paris erected in 1361 through the Evangelist chapel of John. The Bratislava Chapel was also a pre-image of the main church chapel (the Gara Chapel of the Virgin Mary Church, the Zapolya Chapel of Szepeszely).

=== Flourishing of the Popular architecture ===
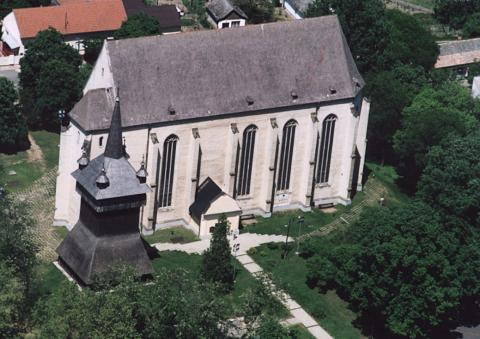
Reformed Church of Nyírbátor

In the 14th century, the popular architecture has evolved more widely. The role of the capital took place in Buda, it was quickly built near the castle, outside the city. The typical Buda house type was established in the 14th and 15th centuries, which overlooks the streets in the Balkan style with its long façade. Representatives of this type are the National House Street number 2 in Budapest, Tarnok Street number 14 in Budapest, Uri Street number 31 in Budapest. Gothic dwellings also remained in the countryside: Kátalántalán Street number 2 in Pécs, Székesfehérvár, Sopron. However, many of these houses were built of wood and destroyed by fire. The same-age sources for woodwork suggest a high level of carpentry. It was important the work of the master carpenter Dénes Gyarmati in Esztergom, who carried out high-ranking orders. Most of the other types of building in the city (City Hall, Guild House, Bath, hospital) are known only from sources of the same age. The remains of the Old City Hall of Buda are in the museum building. Also we found in the Old Town Hall of Bratislava (current Slovakia). However, ecclesiastical architecture was still decisive in the design of the city picture. The parish churches were three-nave Hall churches, without a crossnave, located in or near the market square. The city parishes were often created with royal support, the coat of arms of Louis I of Hungary is found on the City Hall of Sebeș (current Romania), the coat of arms of Sigismund is on the St. Michael's Church in Cluj-Napoca (current Romania), coat of arms of Matthias Corvinus is on the top of the Blessed Virgin Church in Buda. In these churches, the two-tower façade type of the ethnic churches continued, except that only one of the towers was fully built (Košice Dome (current Slovakia), Matthias Church of Budapest, Biserica Neagră (current Romania)). The turret domes were usually designed with four fiatorches. In the cities, the monastery churches of the Mendicant orders also appeared. The Mendicant order was also built on the basis of uniform principles. (one-nave structure, tower next to the apse nave.) A good example of this are the dormitories of the Ulița Lupilor Street in Cluj-Napoca (current Romania), the Franciscan monastery-church of Szeged and the Reformed Church of Nyírbátor. The constructions of the Mendicant order usually took place near the city walls, so the buildings were included in the city's protection system. The construction of the city walls has already been established. Béla also ordered it, but they were built in a mass of Sigismund of 1405. it started after the annual decree. The city walls were crowned by a party, behind it there were wooden protection corridors (Buda, Pest and Cluj-Napoca city walls). The architecture of the market towns was not significant, although church architecture sometimes approached the level of the free royal cities (Gothic Protestant Church of Avas in Miskolc, St. Andrew Church of Debrecen, Franciscan monastery-church of Gyöngyös and Franciscan monastery-church of Szombathely). The layout of the village churches has not changed, the two-storey structure (apse nave and nave) remains. The size of the buildings has increased, the apse nave has a polygon-based, ribbed cross-vault. Tower connected to the west façade. In the Székely Land, was often provided with fortifications and crenellated (Neszmély, Vörösberény). In Transylvanian Saxons lands, the Gothic conversion of Roman churches was common. There are written sources at the end of the 15th century, in addition to civil artists, they begin to talk about field-town and village masters. A unique memory of the architecture of the villages is the Manor Gothic House of Alsóörs.

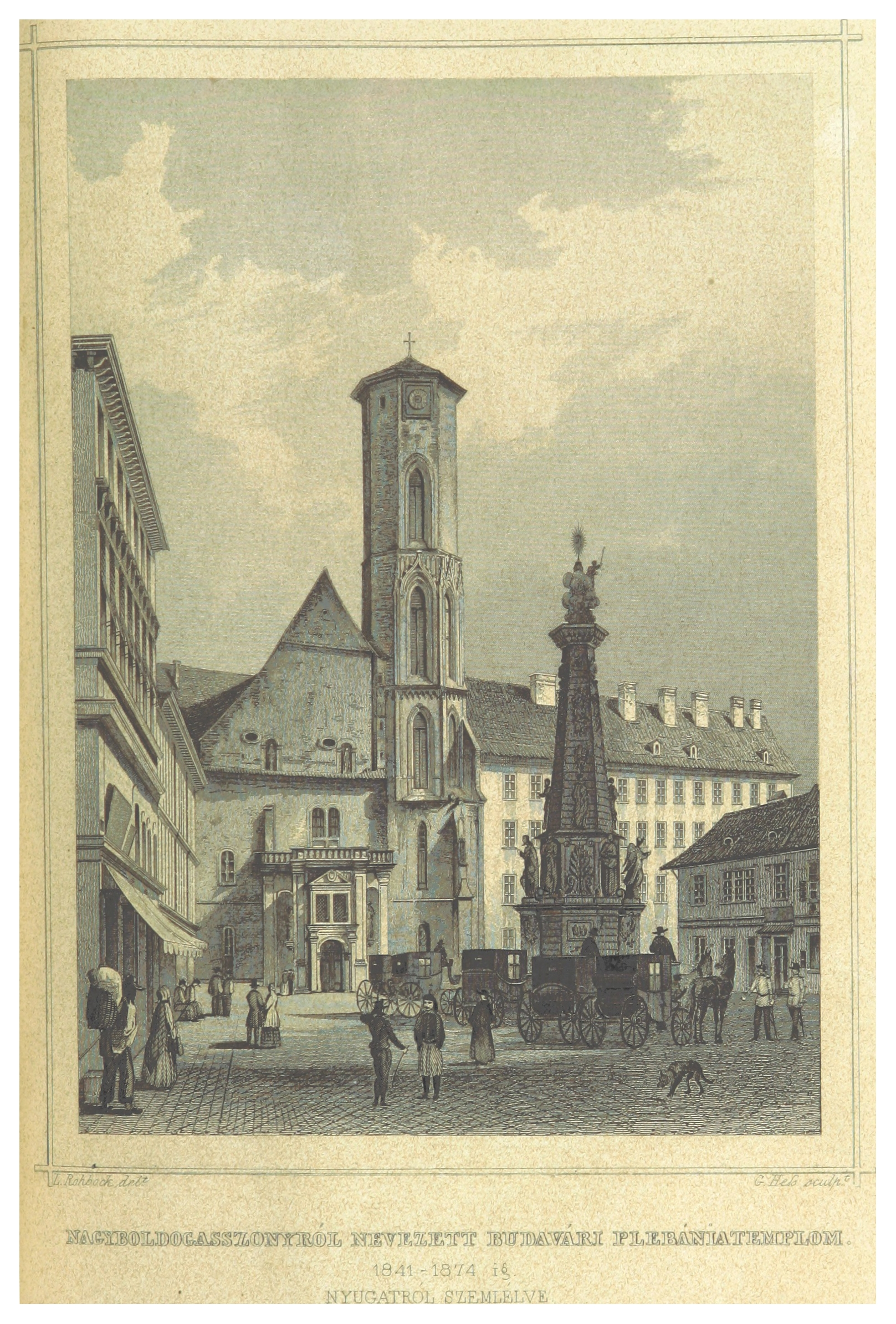
Matthias Church in Budapest before the Gothic Revival modernisation (14th - 15th century)

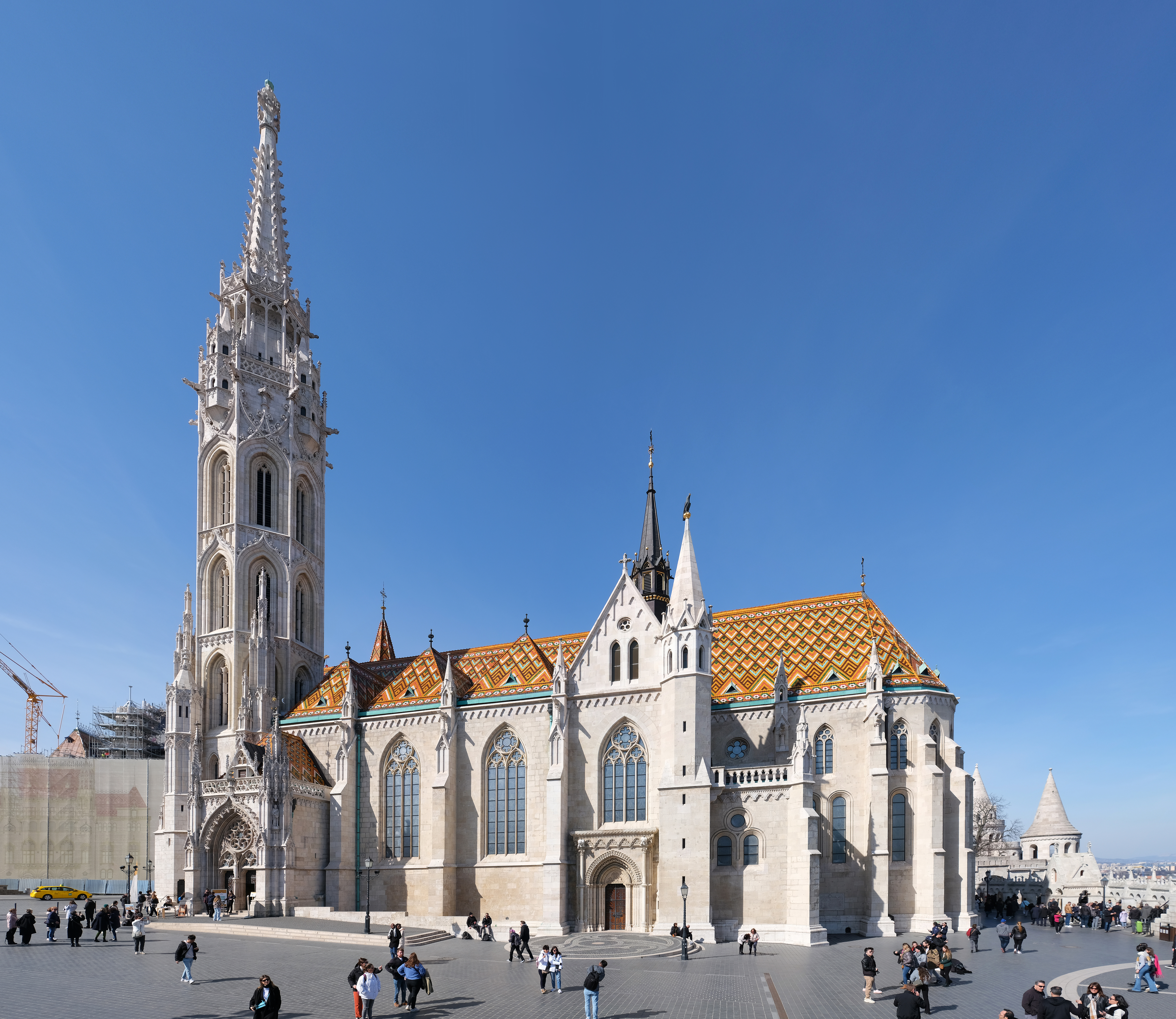
Matthias Church in Budapest after the Gothic Revival modernisation (1874-1896)

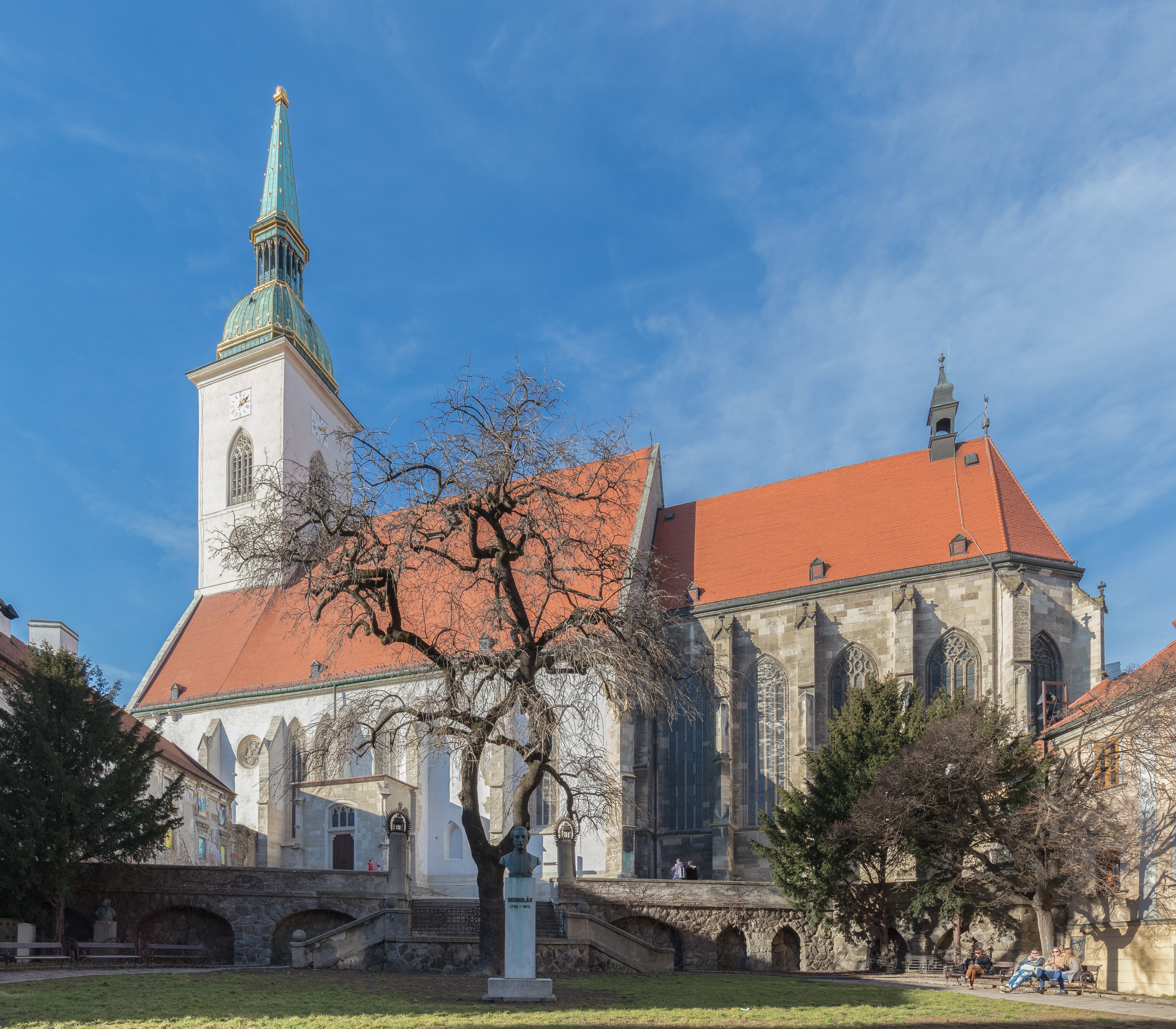
St Martin's Cathedral in Bratislava, now Slovakia (14th - 15th century)

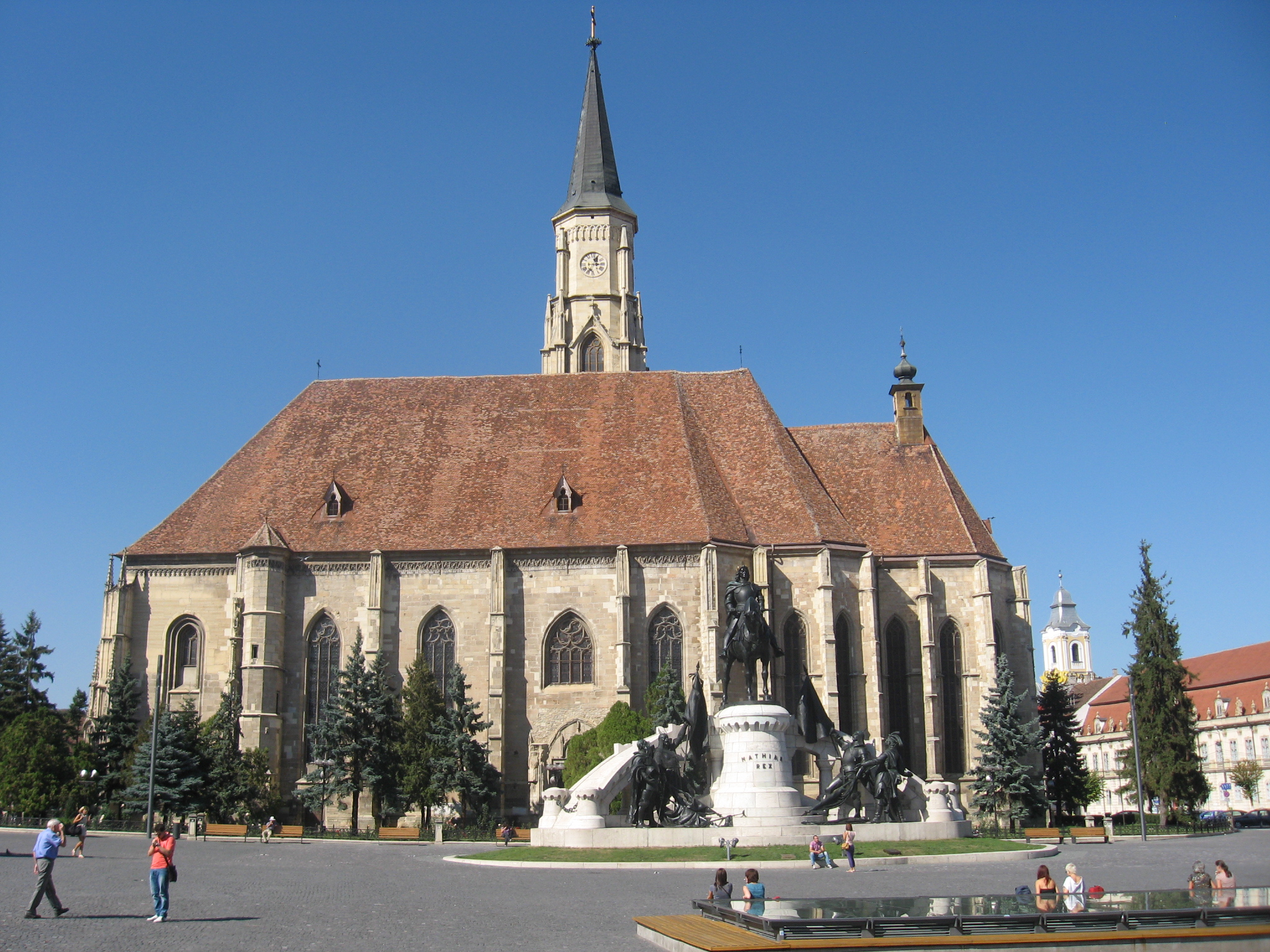
St. Michael's Church in Cluj-Napoca, now Romania (14th - 15th century)

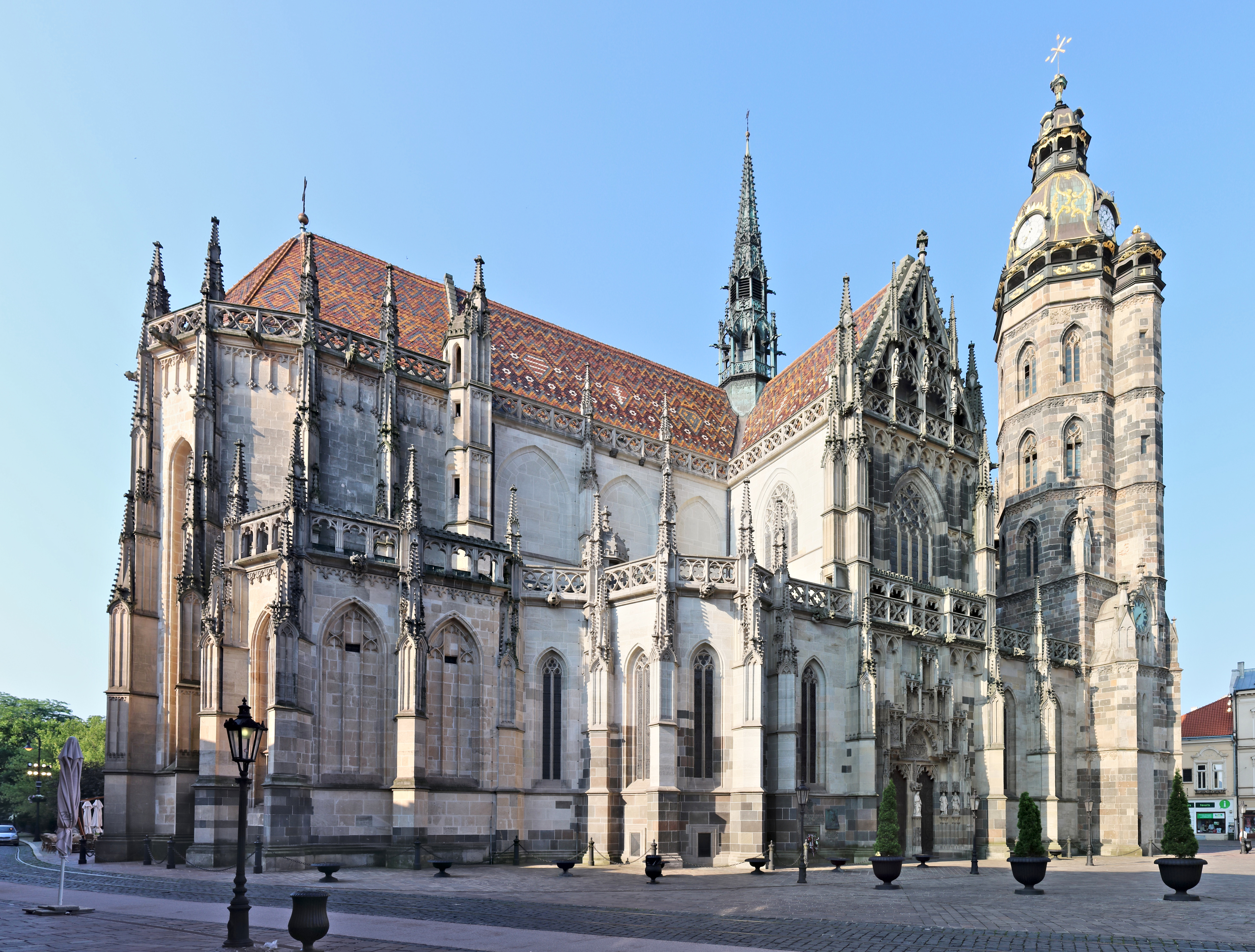
Cathedral of St. Elizabeth in Košice, now Slovakia (14th - 15th century)

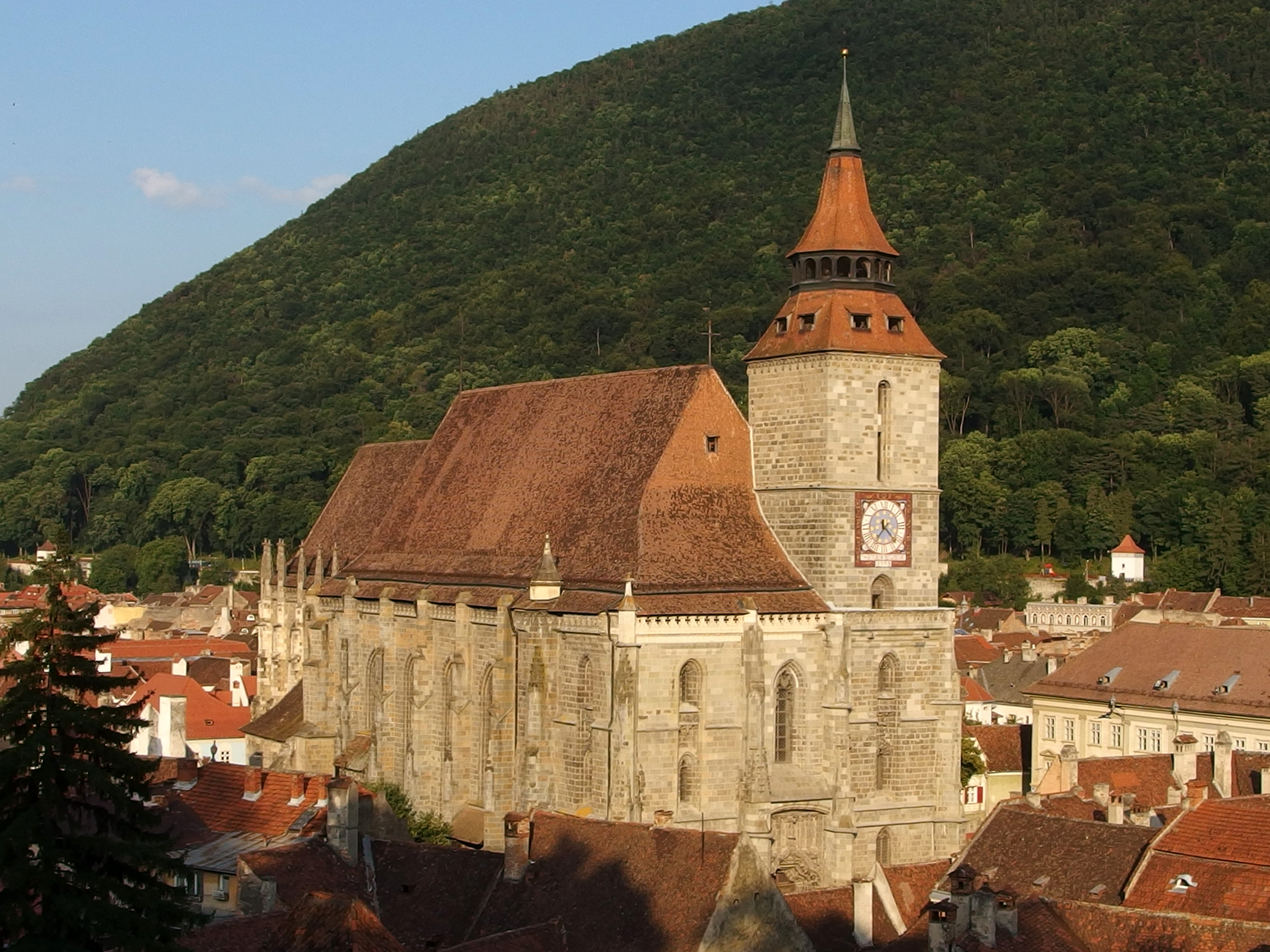
Black Church in Brașov, now Romania (14th - 15th century)

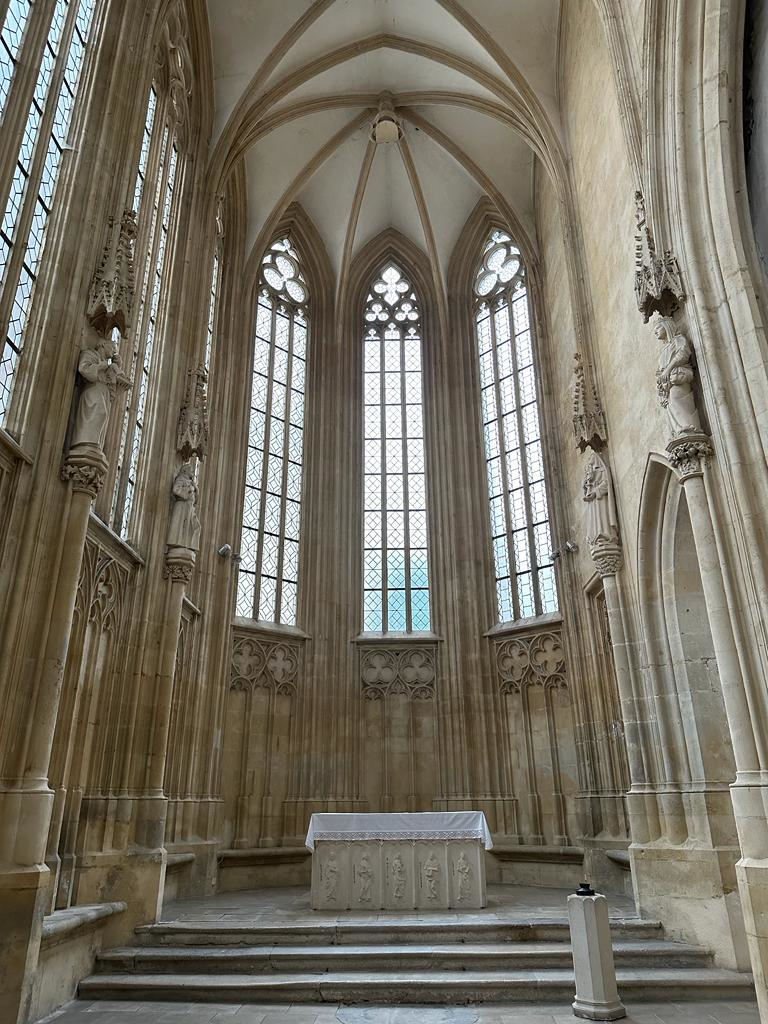
Saint John the Evangelist Chapel in the Franciscan Church, Bratislava, now Slovakia (2nd half of the 14th century)

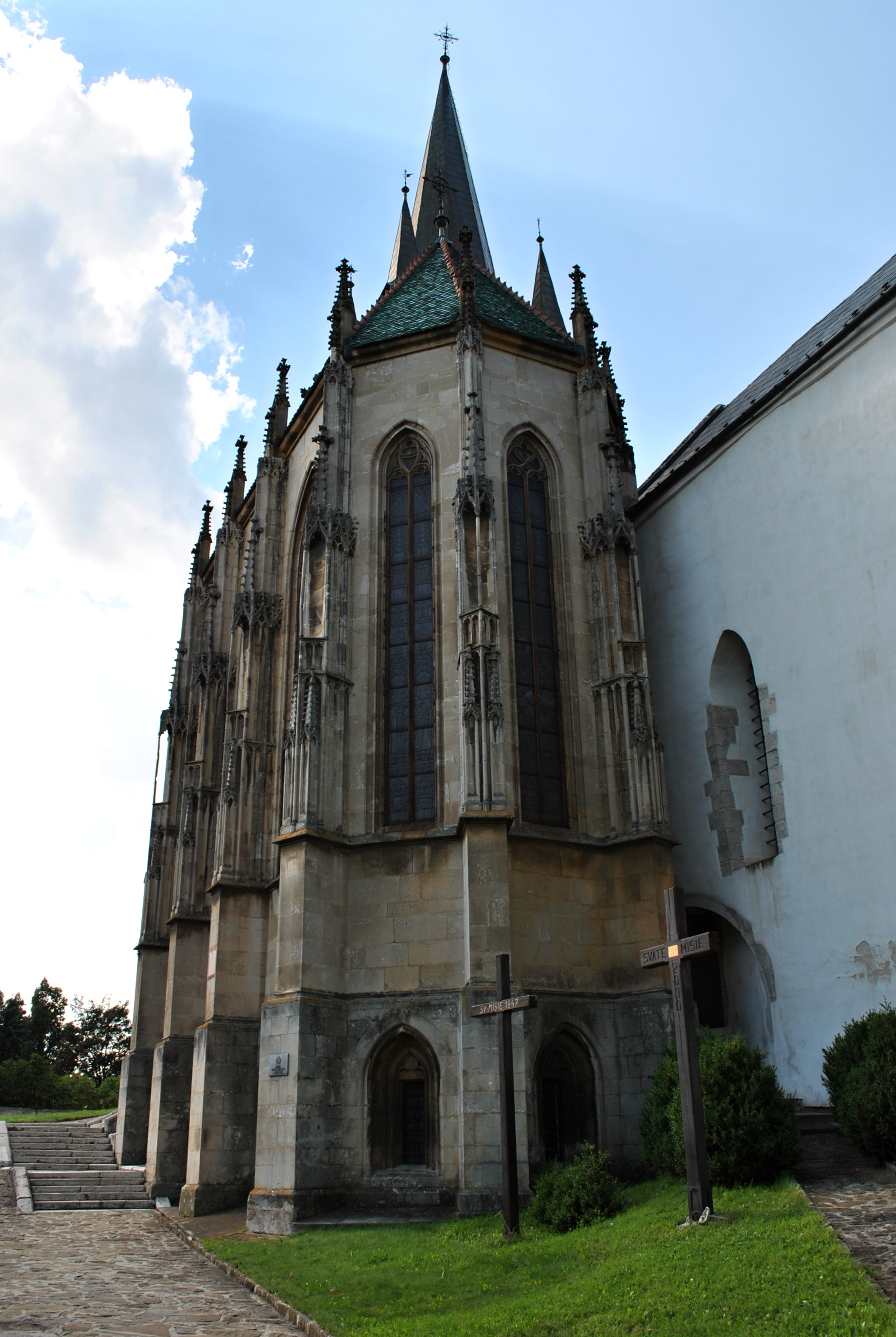
Zápolya Chapel in the Church of St. Ladislaus in Spišský Štvrtok, now Slovakia (1473-1487)

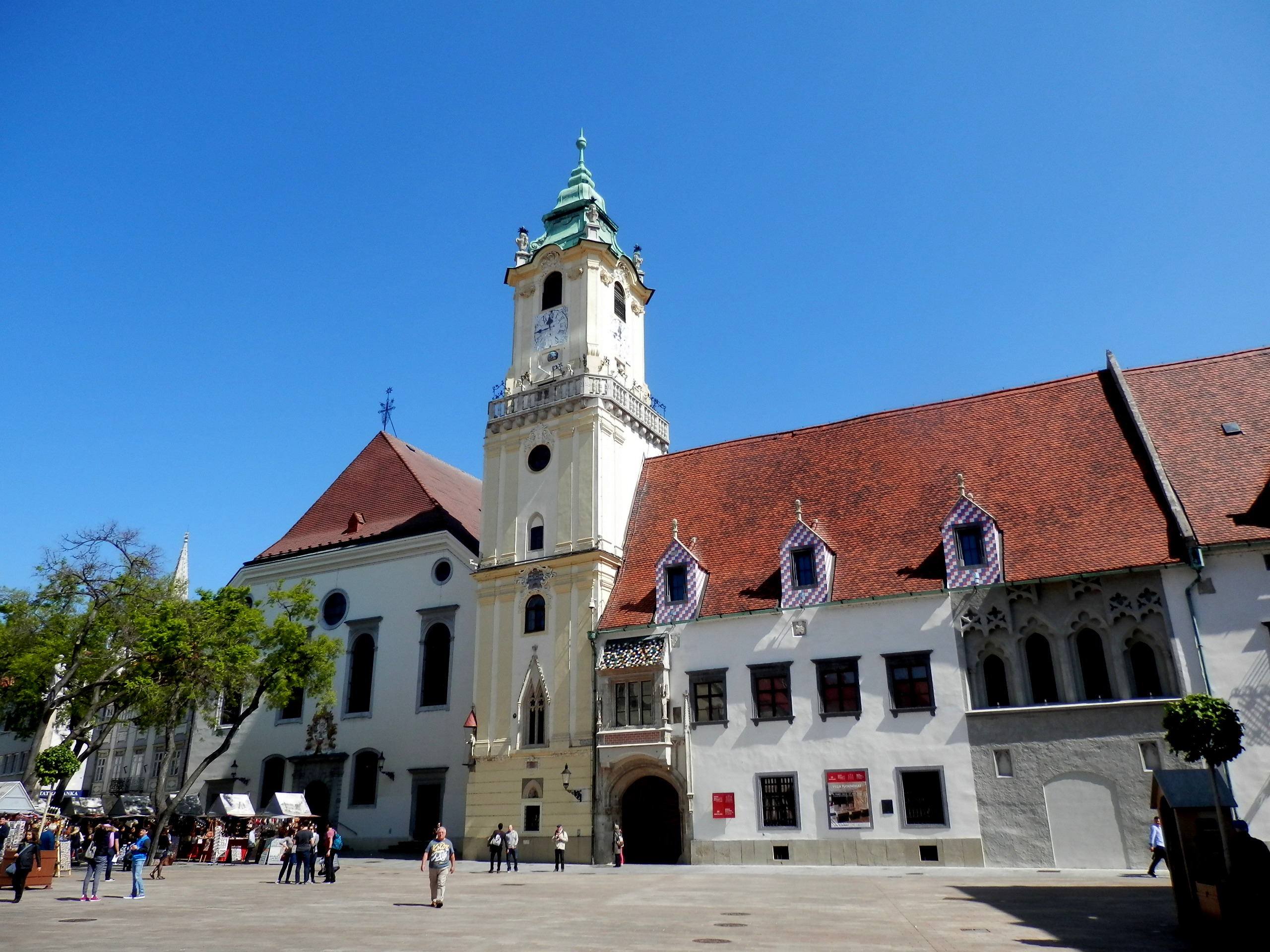
Old Town Hall in Bratislava, now Slovakia (15th century)

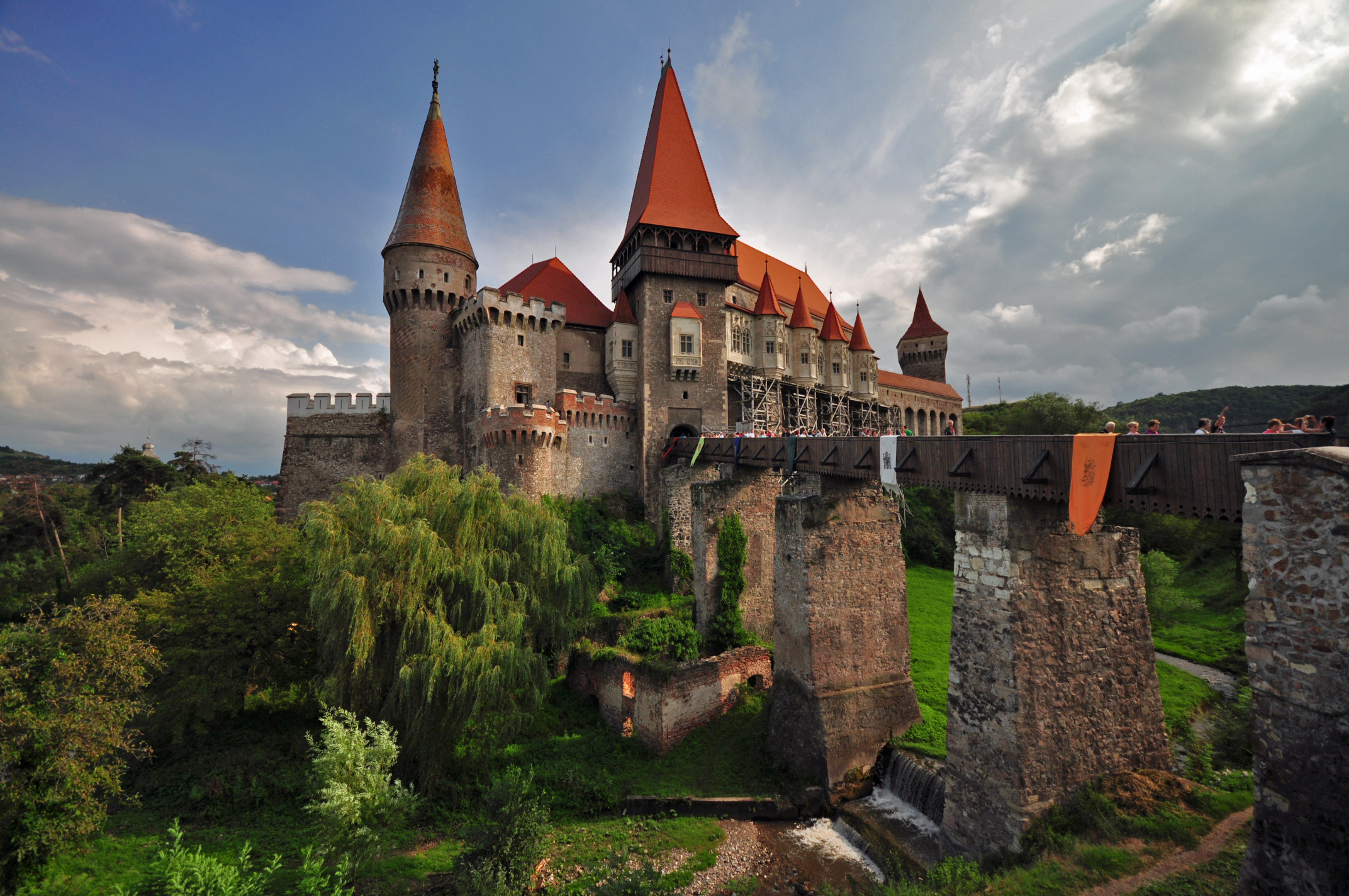
Corvin Castle in Hunedoara, now Romania (1440-1480)

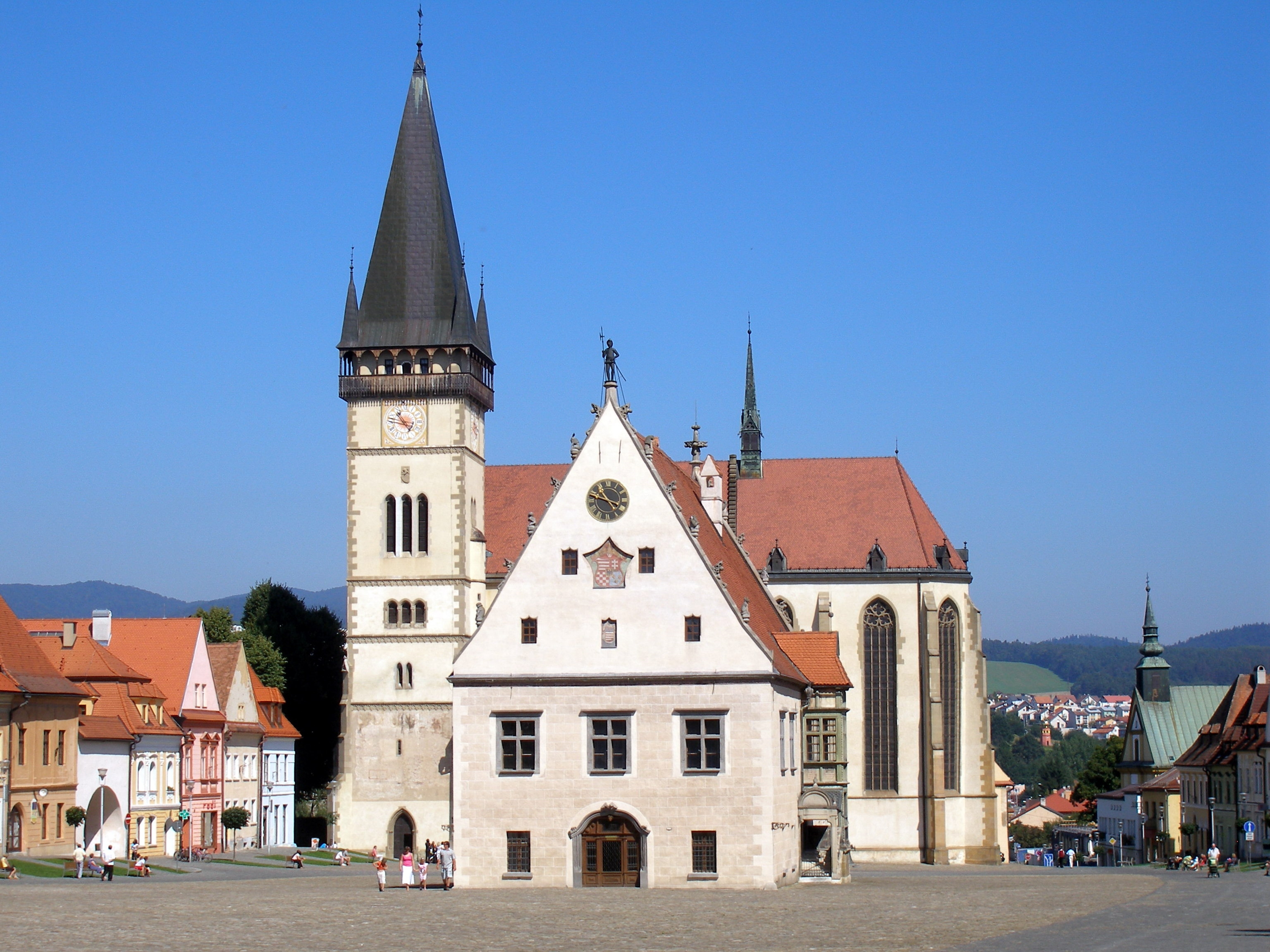
Town hall (1505-1511) and the Basilica of St Giles (14th - 15th century) in Bardejov, now Slovakia

== Renaissance ==
In the second half of the 15th century, the Renaissance began to replace Gothic, and the German-French effect was replaced by the Italian. The changes were also supported by political reasons. The first change of style took place at the seat in Buda thanks to king Matthias Corvinus. The Renaissance has spread through nobility and high priests. The Hungarian Renaissance can be divided into three style periods.

- Early Renaissance (1460-1541)
- Mature Renaissance (1506-1570)
- Late Renaissance (between 1570-1690 or 1750)

It is typical that local variations have developed and some Renaissance phenomena coexist.

=== Early Renaissance ===
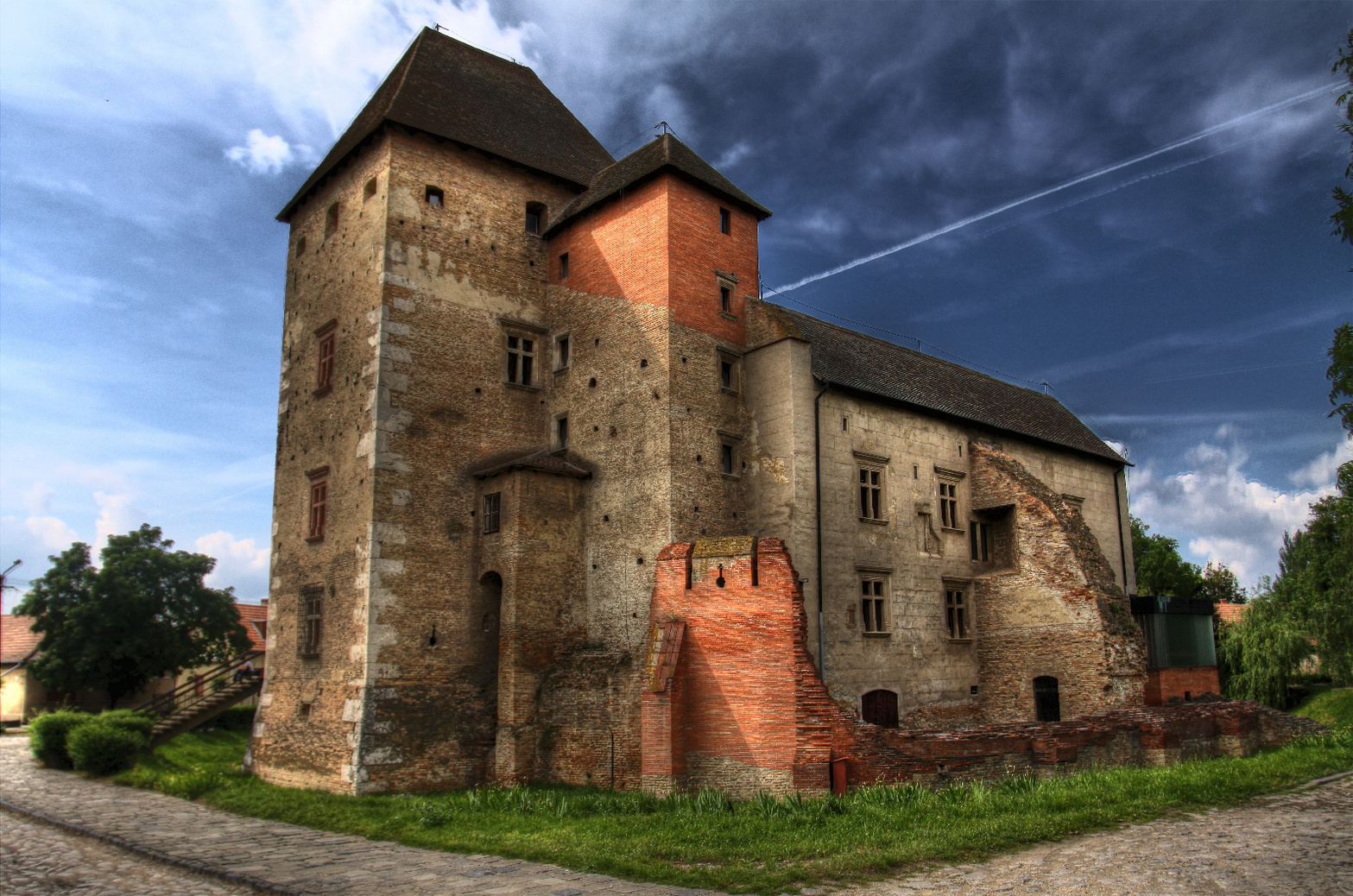
The Renaissance Castle of Simontornya, completed in the 15th century by Matthias Corvinus.

The first Renaissance buildings were Matthias palaces, the East Wing of Buda Castle and its courtyard, the Royal Palace of Visegrád, the villa of Nyék. Their style followed the Tuscan Renaissance. It was then that the order of the facade (columns with semicircles or straight beams), window and door types, decorative motifs, which had an exemplary effect on later construction sites. Matthias ' architect was the Chimenti Camicia, born in Florence. In Buda there was a significant stone-carving workshop, where the stonemakers learned Italian motifs and moved on. Matthias' construction was followed immediately by the construction of the Archbishop of Esztergom (1480-1500), John of Aragon, Ippolito d'Este, Tamás Bakócz, built in Esztergom, Miklós Báthori built in Nógrád (1483) and Vác (1485-95), András Báthori in the castle of Ecséd, Sigismund Ernest Csaktornyai in Zagreb (current Croatia) (1488) and Pécs (1498), Bishop László Geréb in the Gilău (current Romania) (1480–90), Archbishop of Kalocsa Péter Váradi in the Bač Fortress (current Serbia) (1490s), Balázs Ráskai in Csővár, Pál Kinizsi in Nagyvázsony.

In the second half of the early Renaissance, the new style appeared not only in the Transdanubia and the major centres, but also in the Sălaj, Ciuc Mountains in the current Romania, the Zemplén County, Syrmia (current Serbia). Most of the memories follow the traditions of the Matthias period: tabernacles in Pest, carvings in Nyírbátor, fragments in Pécs, details in the Castle of Siklós also in the Kátalántalán Street 2 in Pécs, the façade of the number 2, the Papal vault gate passage built in 1515. In Transylvania, in addition to the Tuscan effect, the Lombard effect can be detected (the Chapel of Johannes Lazo on the north side of the Alba Iulia Cathedral (current Romania)).

=== Mature and late Renaissance ===
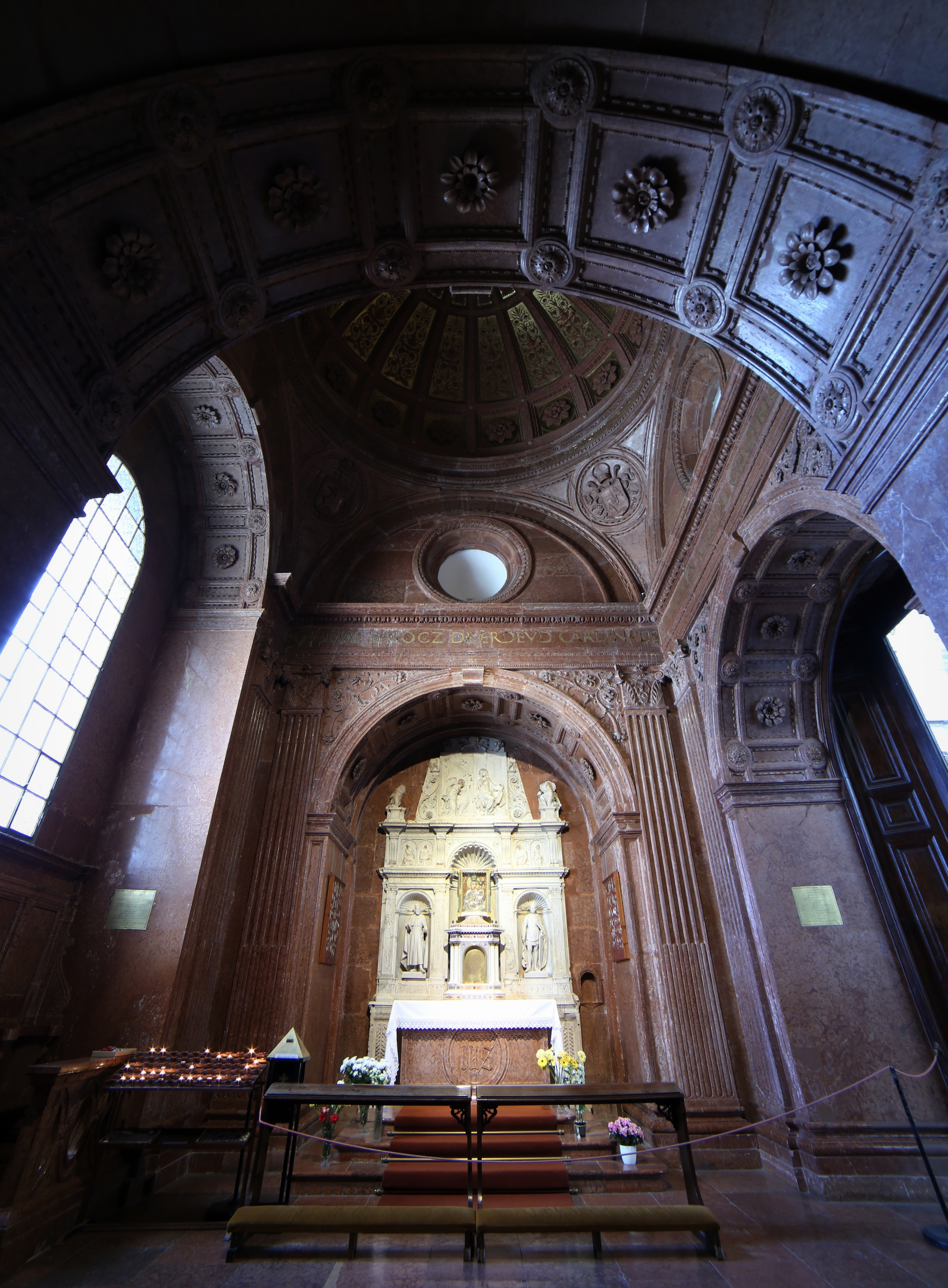
The Bakócz Chapel of the Esztergom Cathedral

The signs of the mature Renaissance can be seen from 1506, in the construction of the Bakócz Chapel. The Bakócz chapel is important example of the Hungarian architecture of the 16th century. The carvings of Joannes Fiorentinus and the tabernacle of Archbishop George Szatmári in Pécs represent the same line.

After the fall of the Mohács and the Buda emergency, architecture continued on a very different line. In accordance with the division of the country, three artistic provinces were formed, the form language of which can be distinguished: Transdanubian, Upper Hungary and Transylvania.

However, there was still an Italian effect, until 1526 in Tuscan, then in northern Italy, from the 1570-80's cinquecento had a stronger form language, again having a Tuscan effect, especially in Transylvania, while in Transdanubia they continued to adapt to the Upper Solas.

For the time of the late Renaissance, Hungarian character becomes decisive, none of elements that would be purely Italian, despite the fact that many Italian masters worked in the country.

==== Transdanubian ====
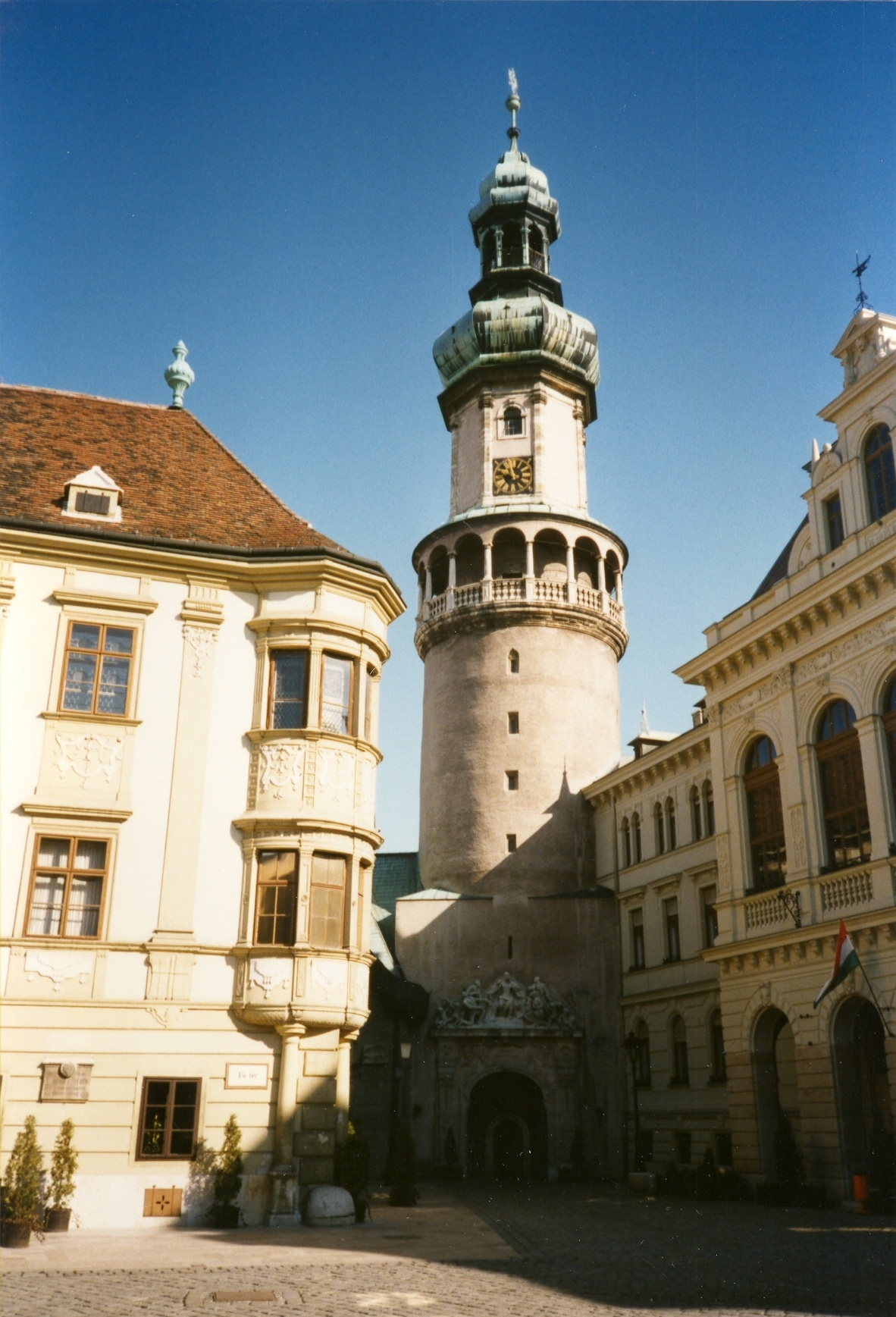
The Firewatch Tower of Sopron

In the Transdanubia, the traditions of the previous era were the purest. The Italian military engineers have established the Italian Rook system and the cinquecento forms have appeared. In the second half of the 16th century, the forms of late cinquecento evolved and the late Renaissance also appeared. New types of buildings have been established, such as the rectangular castle type with arcades, such as the destroyed fortress of Kanizsa by Pietro Ferrabosco, and the Castle of Egervár.

The memories of the late Renaissance in transdanubia are mainly castles, such as the Deutschkreutz (current Austria), the dominant form of the -loggia of the Firewatch Tower of Sopron, which also appeared on residential houses.

==== Upper Hungary ====
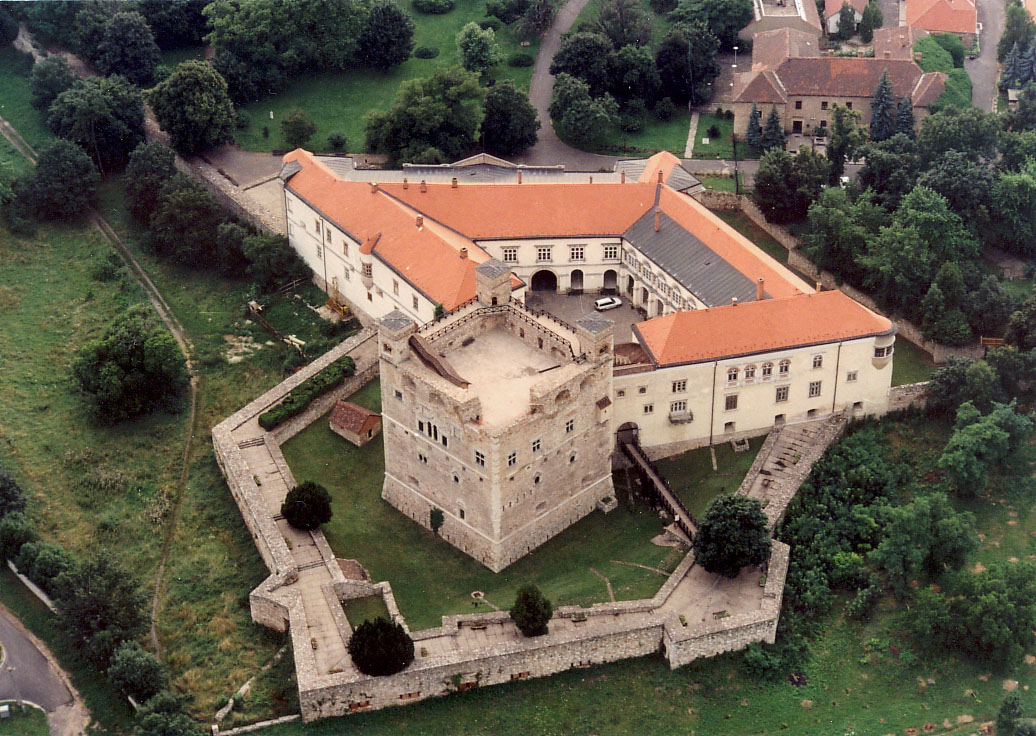
Castle of Sárospatak

The distinctive Upper Hungary style has developed into an upper Italian effect and has an extraordinary variety. The Castle of Sárospatak can be built at the beginning of the development. The 16th century construction site is located in the Perényi district. In the second half of the century, a lot of construction followed, at first Lombard and later Renaissance forms (Trenčín castle (current Slovakia), 1540; Markušovce (current Slovakia), 1567; Orava Castle (Slovakia), 1561-1611; Town hall of Banská Bystrica (Slovakia), 1564–65; Nitra Castle's gate (Slovakia), 1582–87; Ugruțiu Castle (Romania), 1589; Bytča Castle (Slovakia), 1571-1605).

The late Renaissance ruled in the 17th century, and this was reflected in the building and form of the castles (Budatín Castle (Slovakia), Beniczky's Castle in Dolná Mičiná (Slovakia), 1667; Topoľčianky Castle (Slovakia), 1662; houses in Levoča and Prešov (Slovakia)). The architecture of the old Szepes County and Sáros County, which was named the "Paris Renaissance", represents a particular colour, and because of its local character, it is easily distinguished from Polish, Austrian and Czech houses. Its most beautiful memories are the Thurzó's Betlanovce Castle (Slovakia) (1564), the belfry of Kežmarok (Slovakia) (1591), the church tower of Svinia (Slovakia) (1628), the Emeric Thököly's Castle of Kežmarok (Slovakia), the Castle of Fričovce (1623–30) (Slovakia), and several houses of Levoča and Prešov (Slovakia).

==== Transylvania (current Romania) ====
It was here that the Renaissance developed its most peculiar image, which was formed after Italian designs, under the direction of the regal centre. The mecenatura has intensified the building mood. The cinquecento felt its effects between 1530–70, from this period the Gherla Castle, The Humanist dwelling house of Adrianus Wolphard in Cluj-Napoca, the southern wing of Bethlen Castle in Vințu de Jos, the Palace of Mănăstirea.

From the second half of the 16th century the late Renaissance, which started with castle construction (Oradea Castle, Făgăraș Castle, Șimleu Silvaniei Castle, István Kokas's house in Cluj-Napoca) is counted. The stone carving of the Cluj-Napoca School was established, which can be monitored for 150 years for orders and operations throughout Transylvania.

The architecture of the 17th century coincides with the flower age of Transylvania, huge castle buildings, royal palaces were built, which also served as a model (Váradi pentagonal interior castle, Medieșu Aurit Castle, Iernut Castle and Ineu Castle).

In the second half of the 17th century, construction sites of national importance stopped, senior palaces were built instead of castles, like the Bethlen Castle in Sânmiclăuș, which was based on the own designs of Miklós Bethlen. At the late of the 17th century the Transylvanian floral Renaissance was founded, which was manifested primarily in decorative design. Most falls in the 18th century, the last appeared in the stone carving work of Dávid Sipos in Chidea.

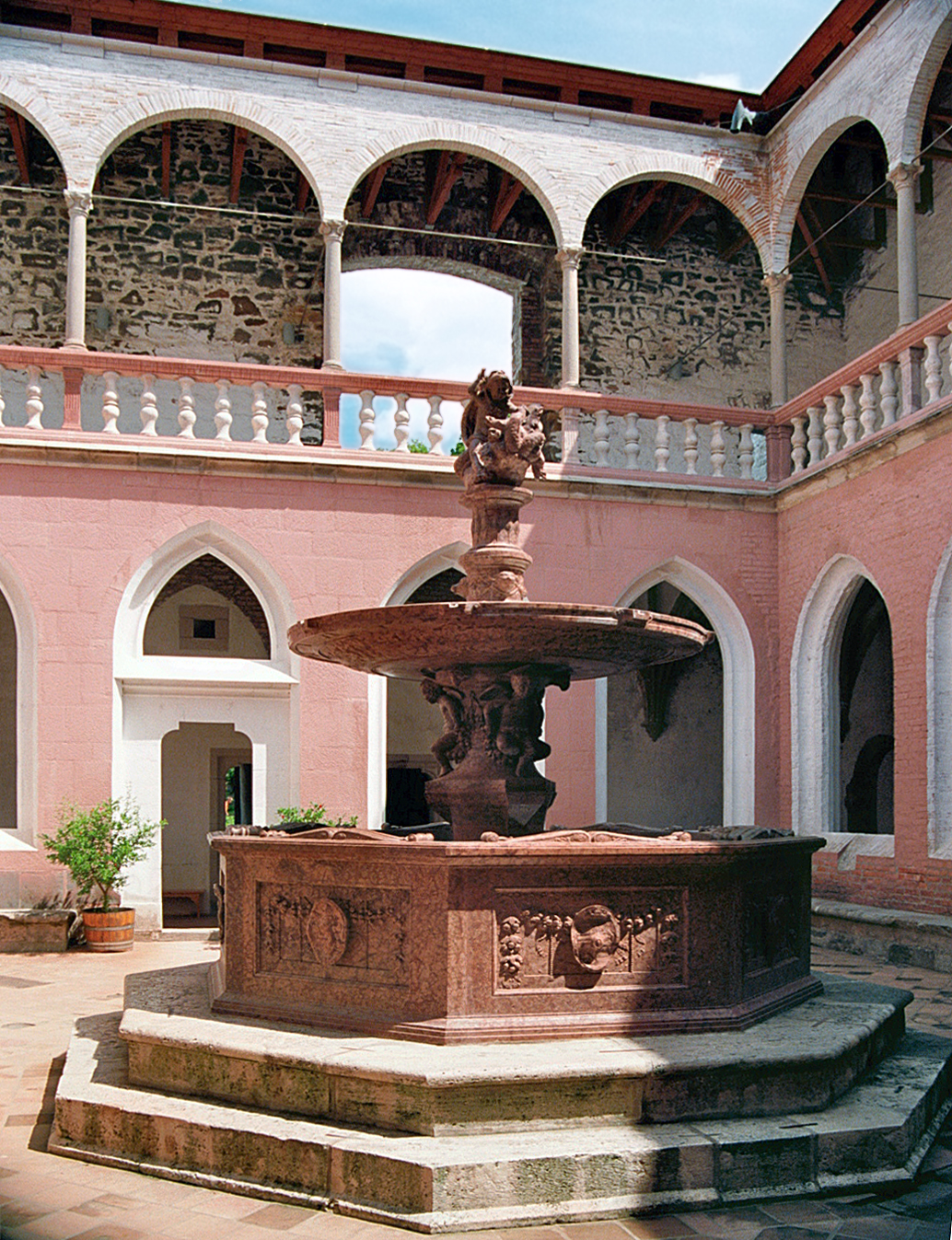
Royal Palace of Visegrád

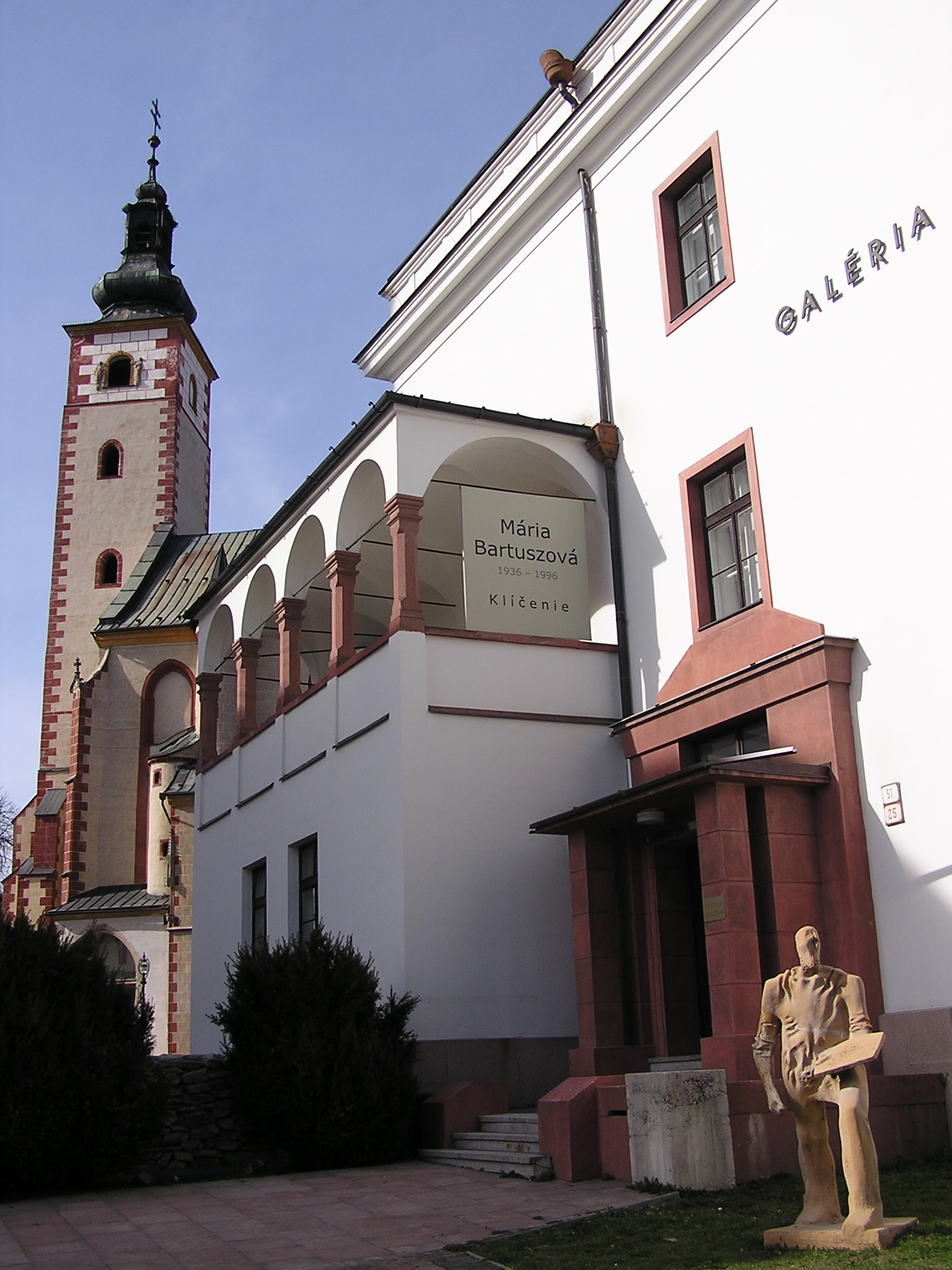
Old Town Hall in Banská Bystrica, now Slovakia

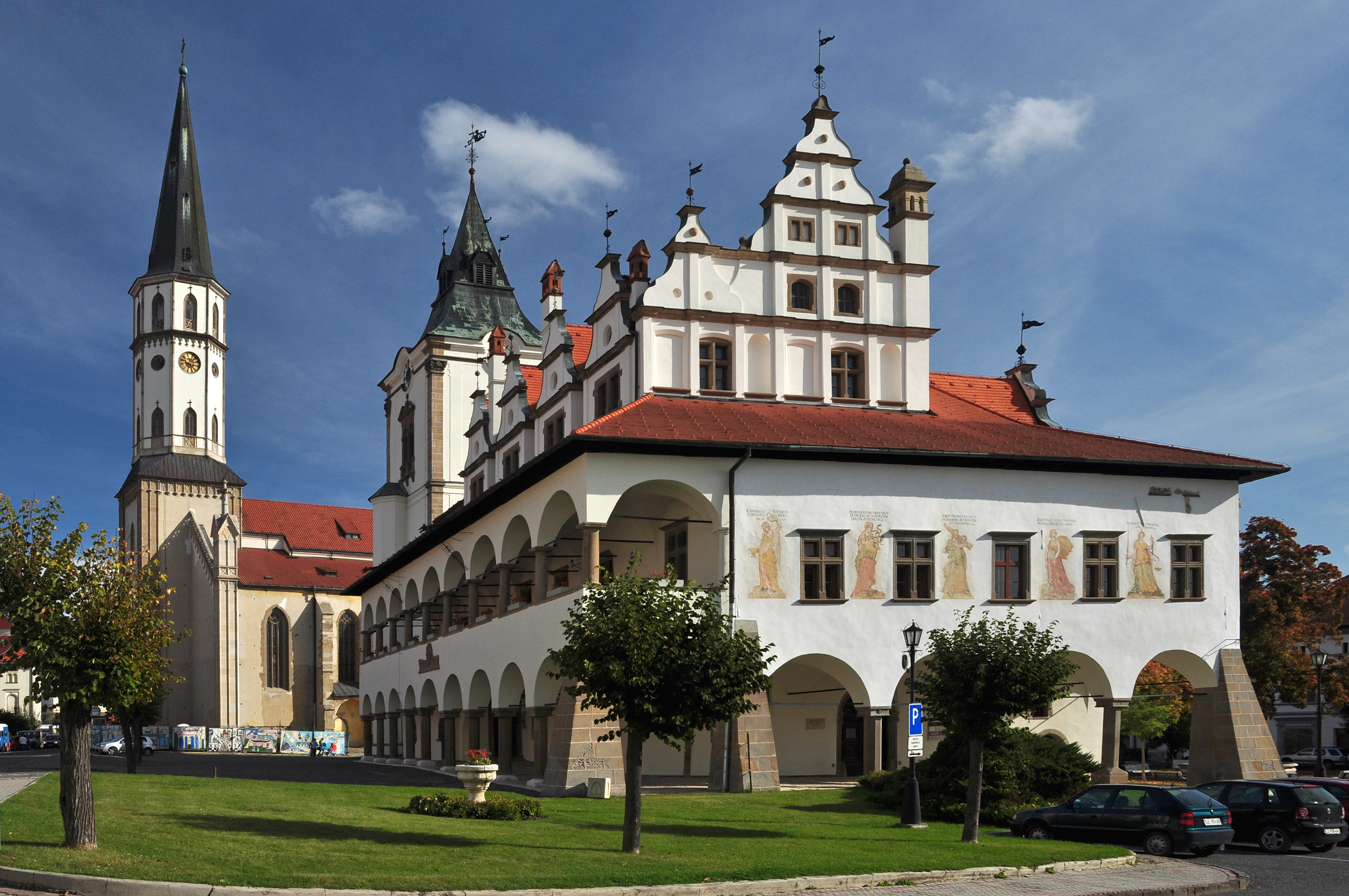
Old Town Hall in Levoča, now Slovakia

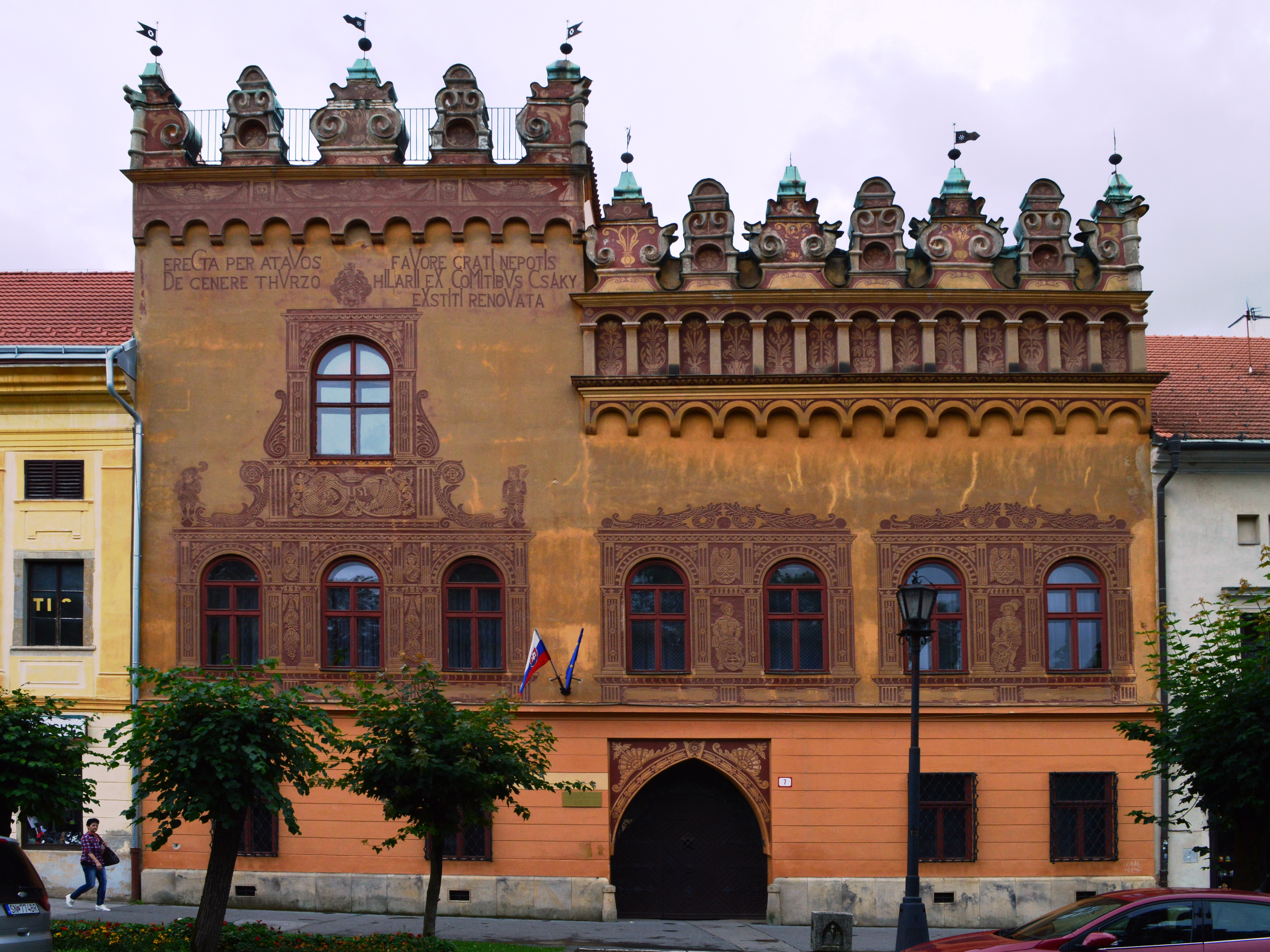
Thurzo House in Levoča, now Slovakia

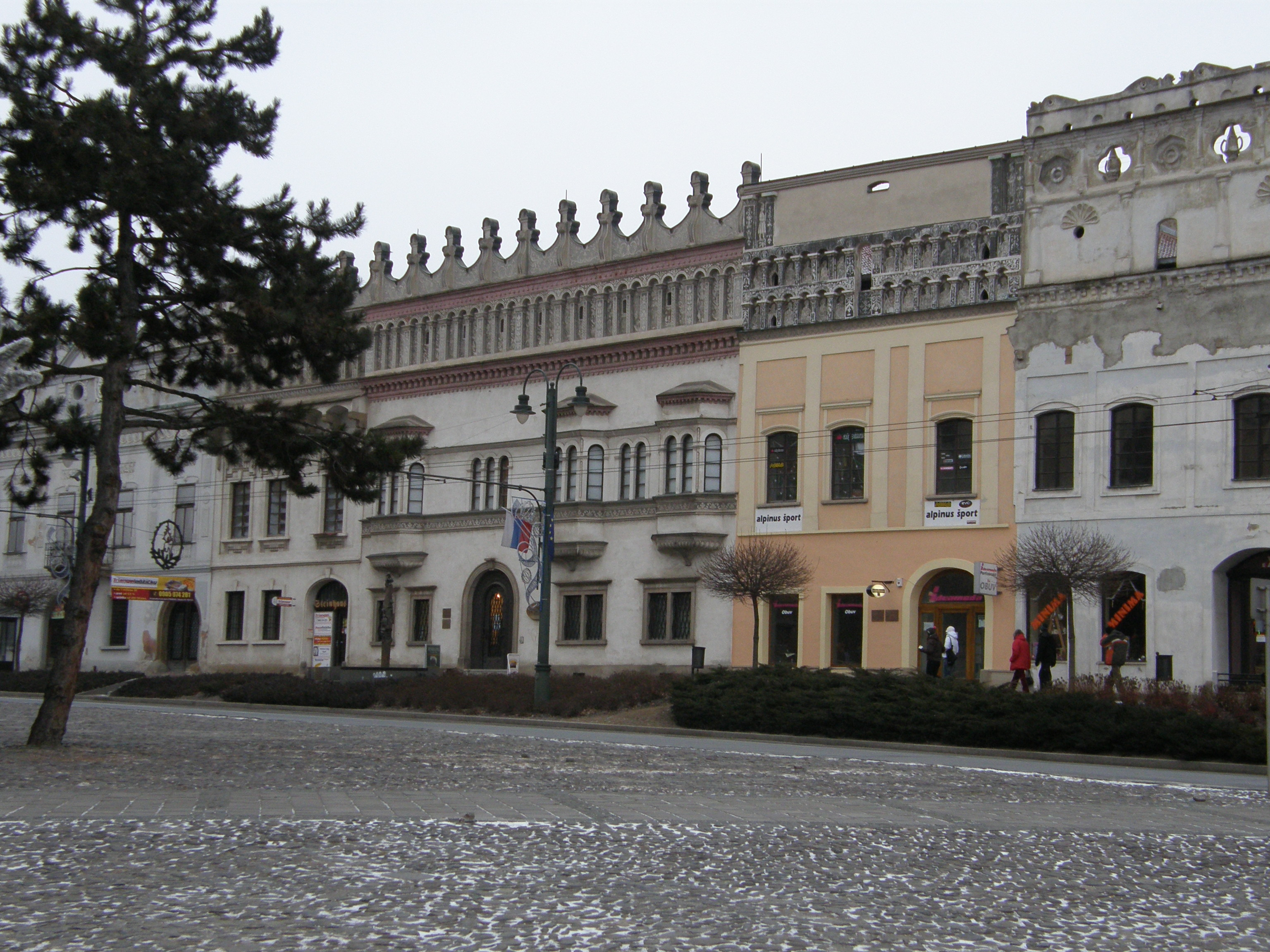
Houses on the Main Square in Prešov, now Slovakia

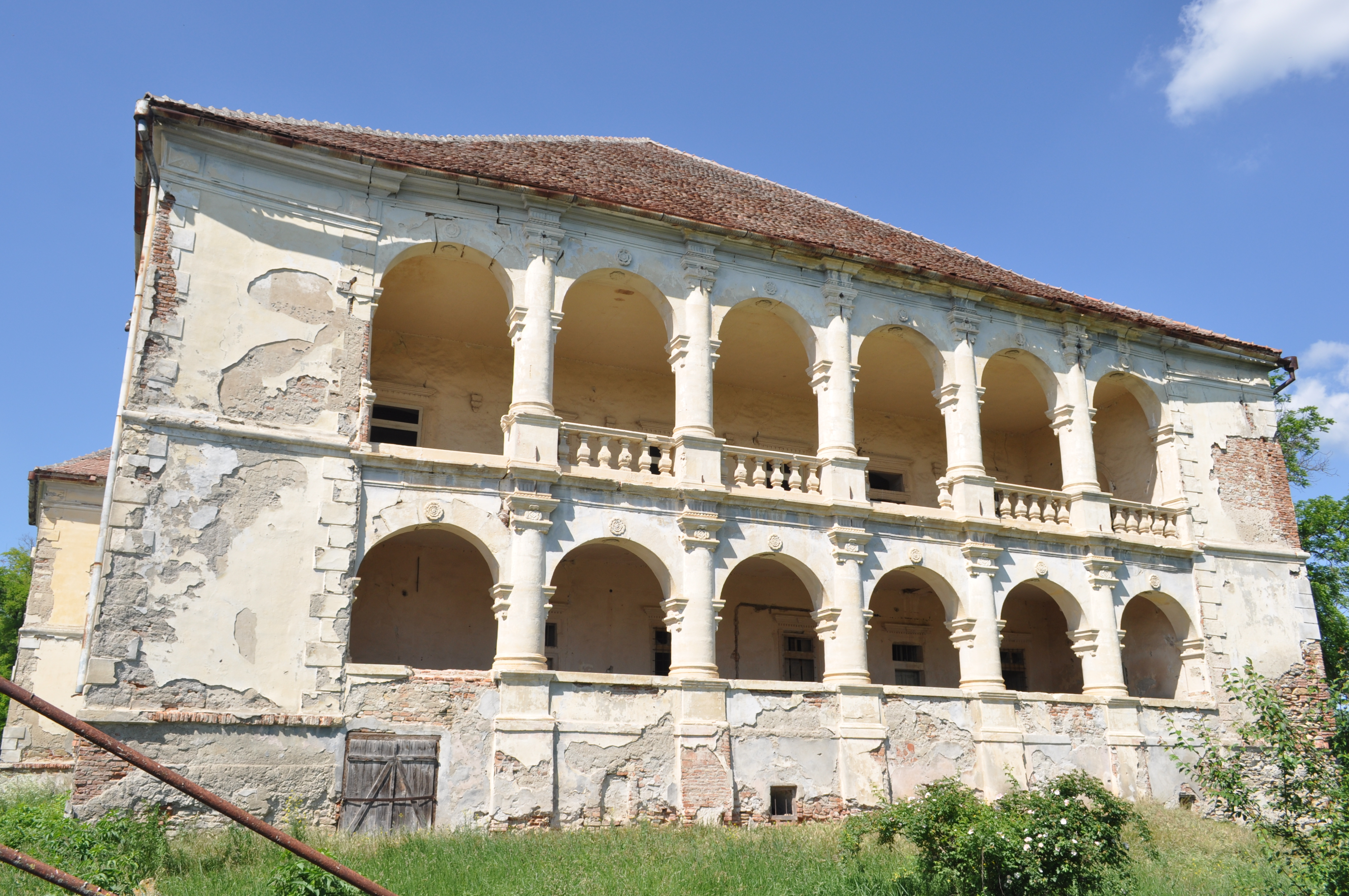
Bethlen Castle in Sânmiclăuș, now Romania

== Ottoman-Islamic architecture in Hungary ==
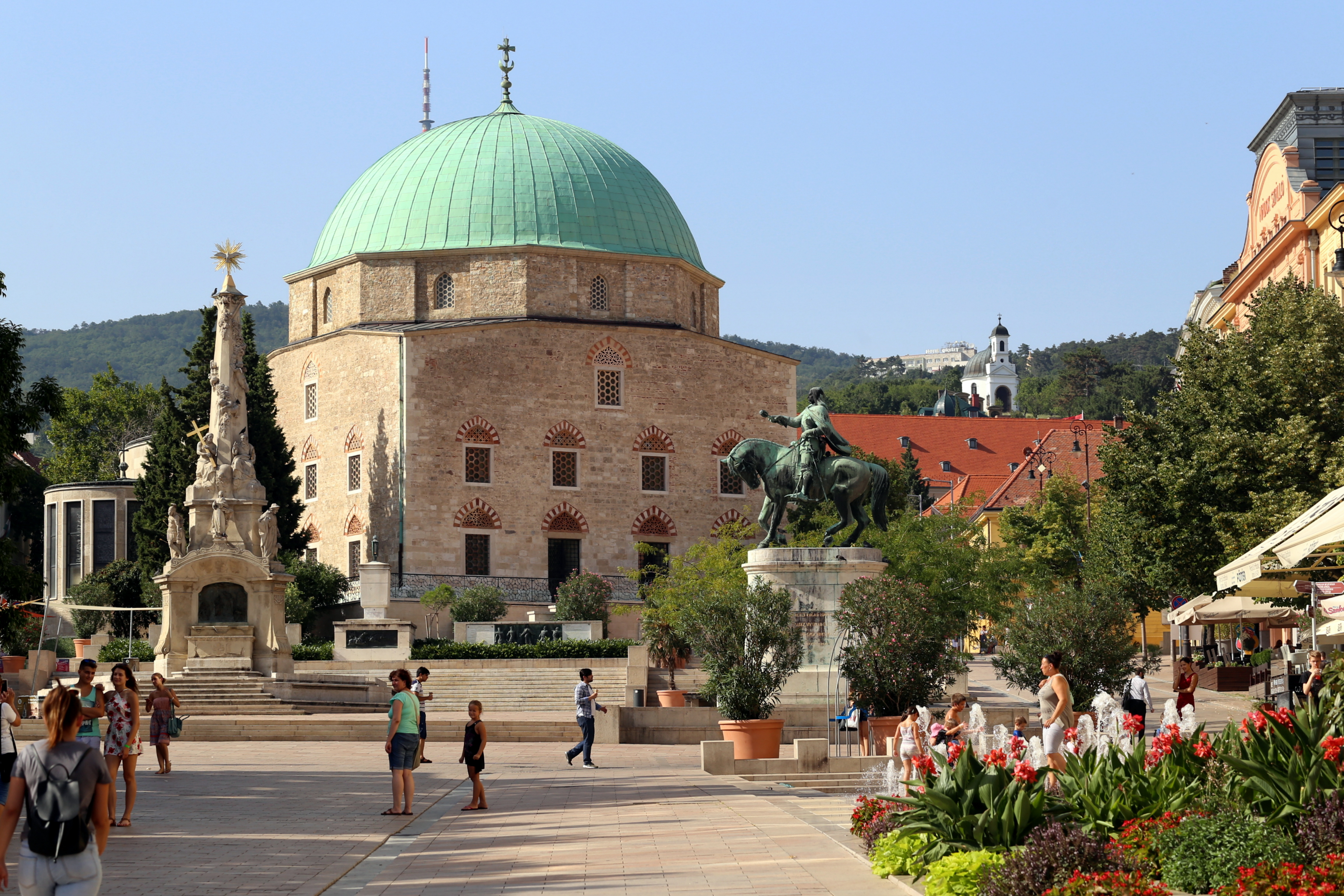
Mosque of Pasha Qasim in Pécs

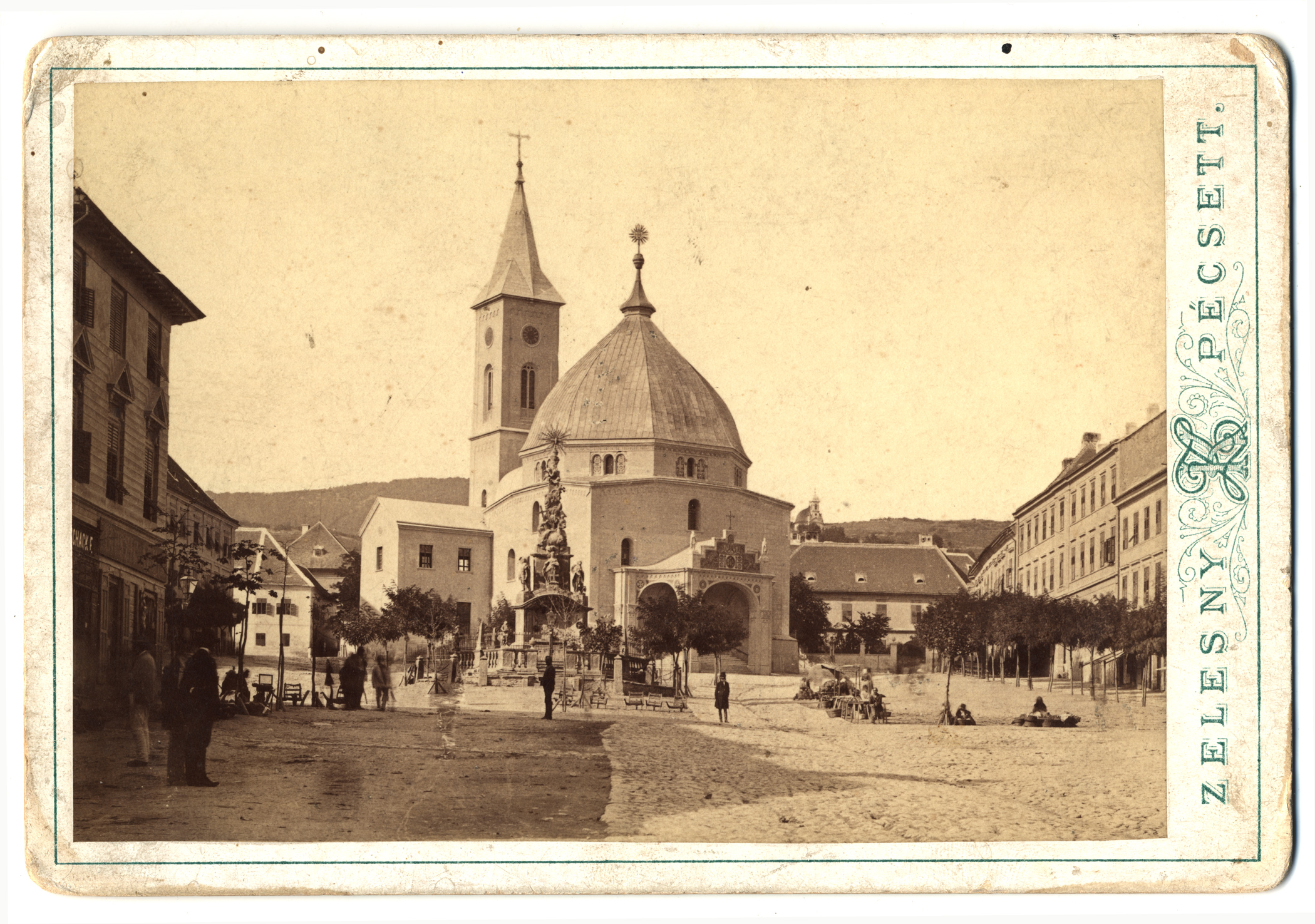
Mosque of Pasha Qasim in the 1880s

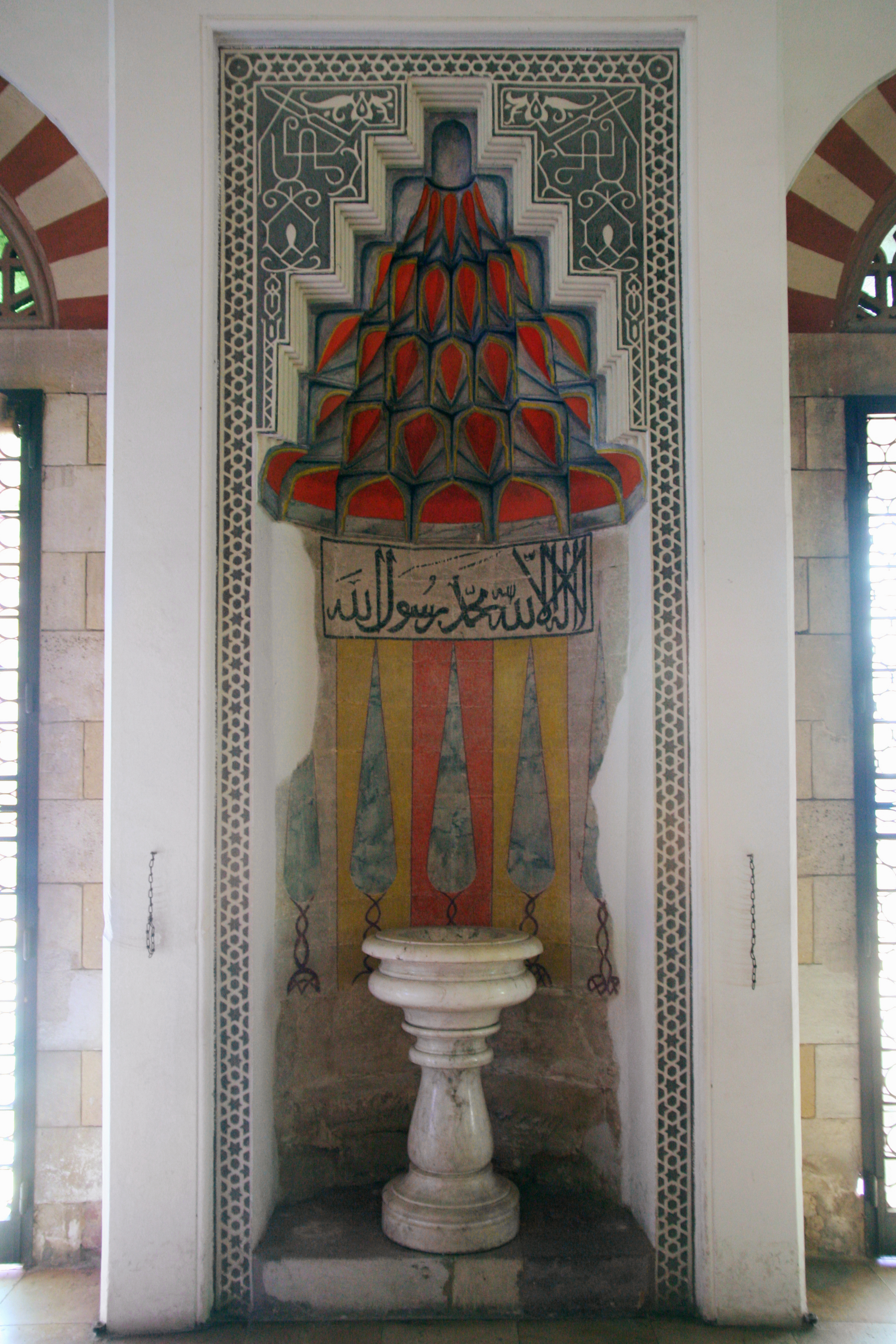
Fountain in the Mosque of Pasha Qasim in Pécs

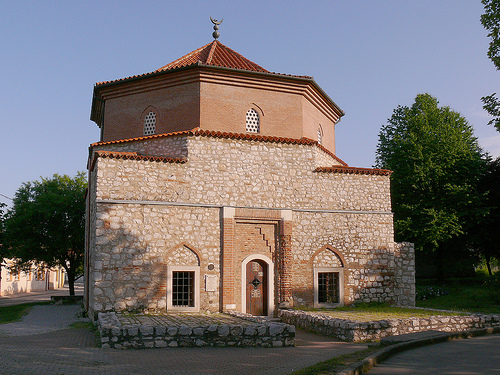
Malkoç Bey Mosque in Siklós

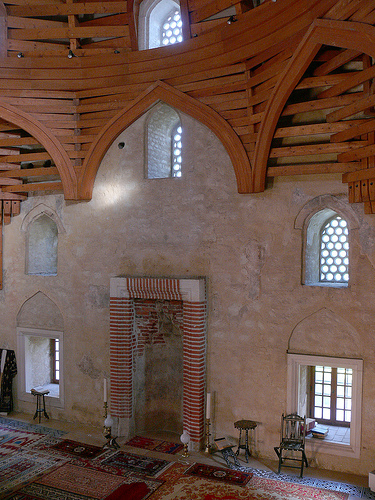
Interior of Malkoç Bey Mosque in Siklós

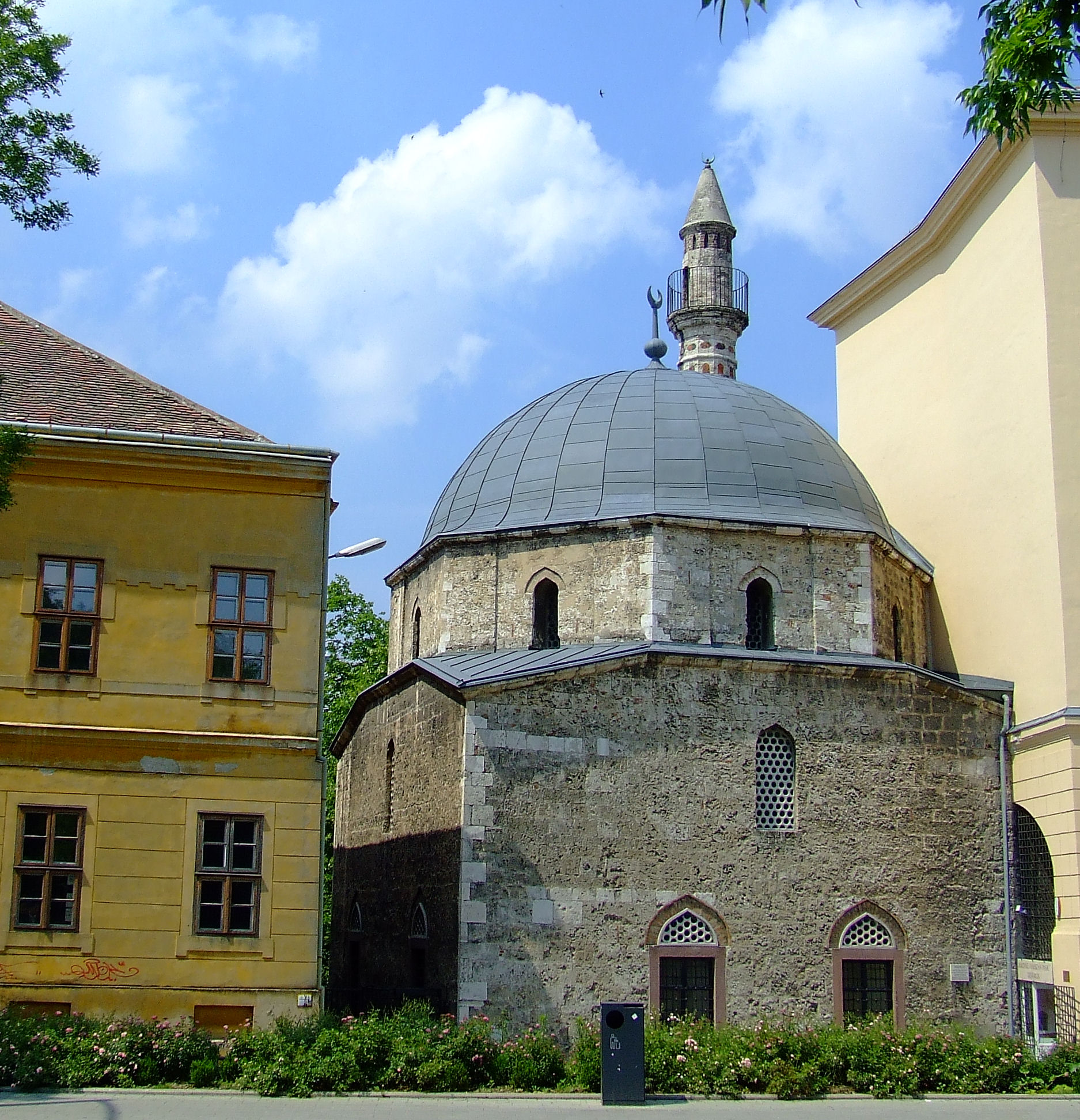
Yakovalı Hasan Paşa Mosque in Pécs

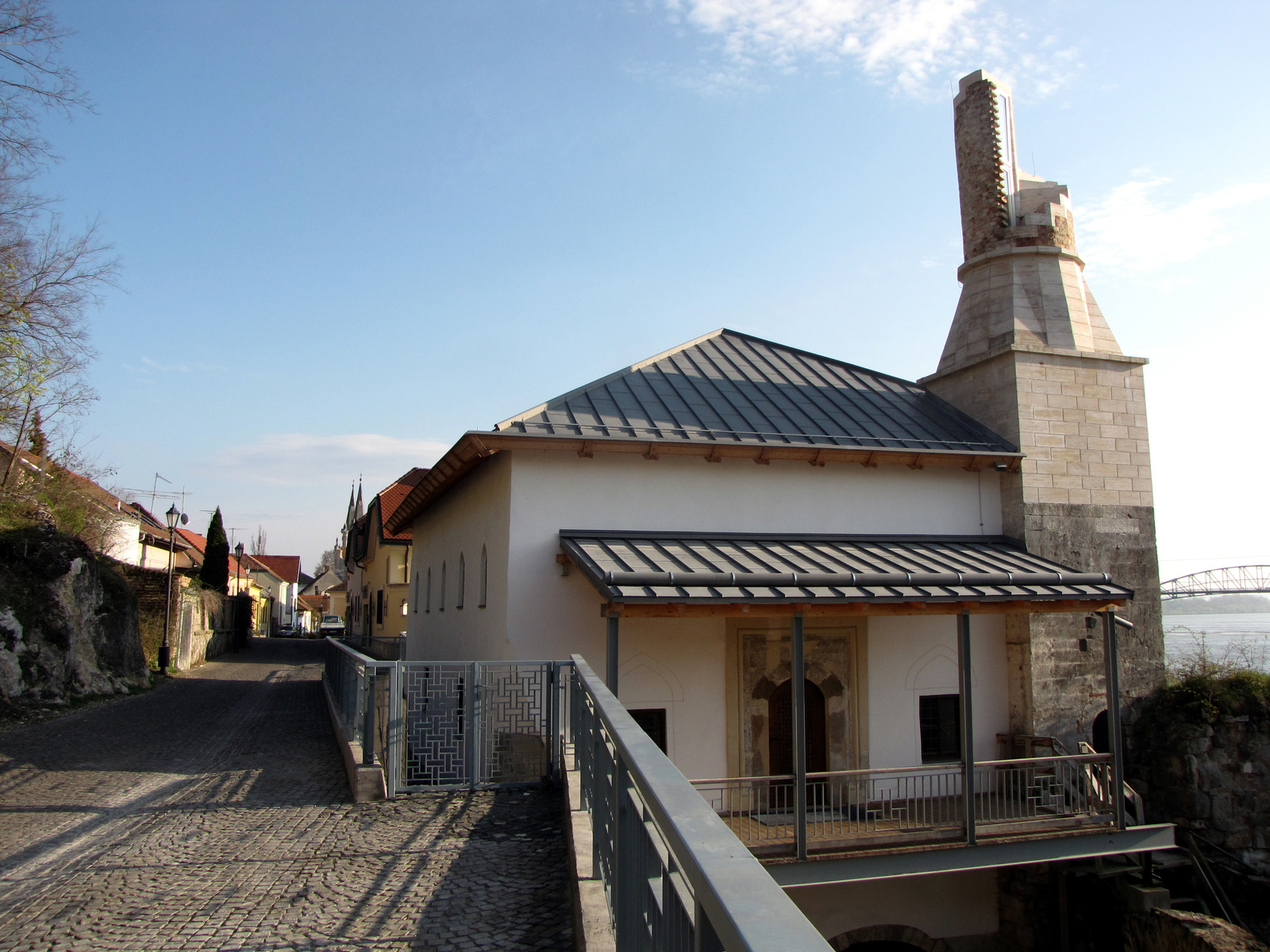
Özicseli Hadzsi Ibrahim Mosque in Esztergom

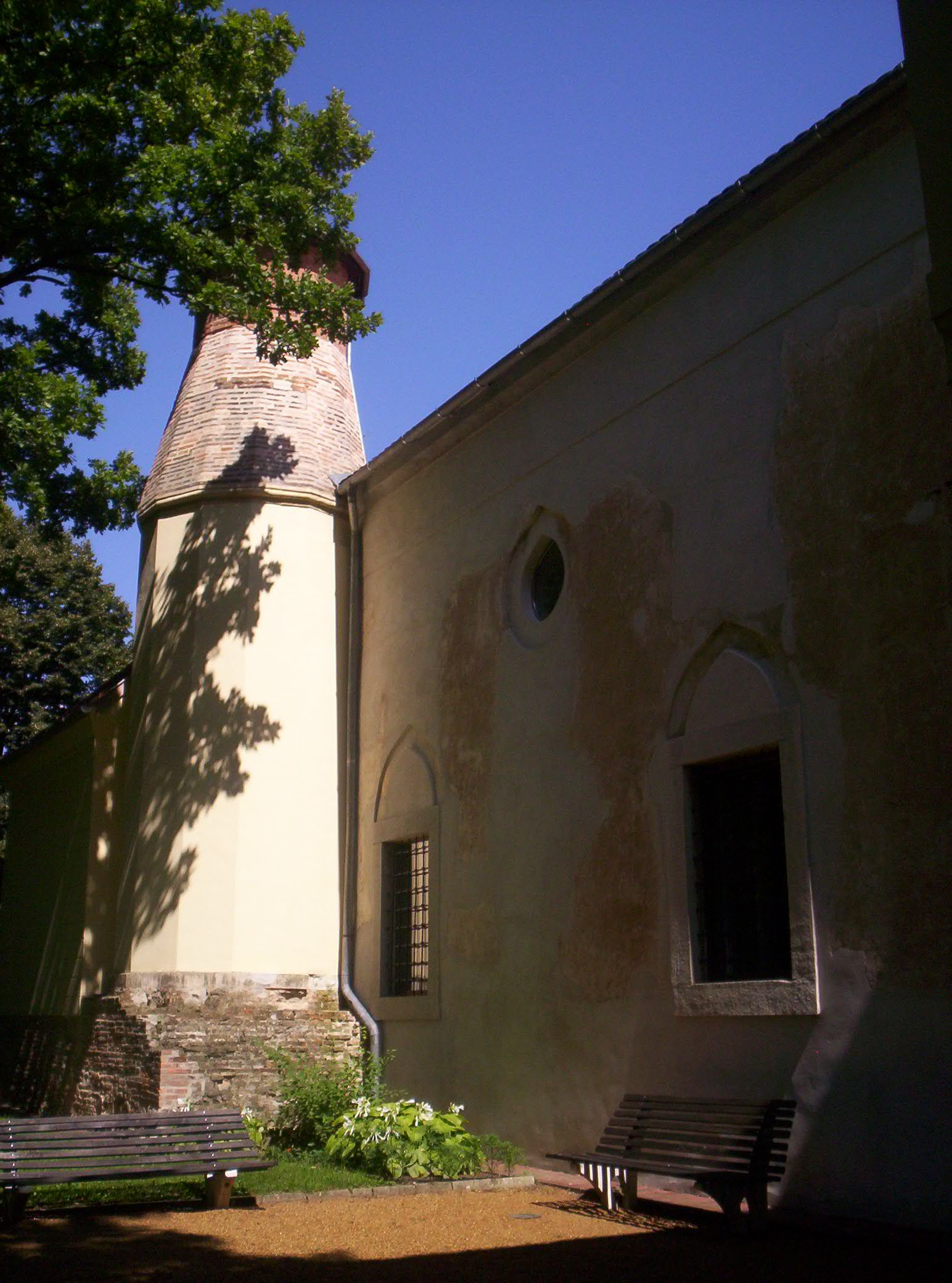
The Mosque of Sultan Suleiman in Szigetvár

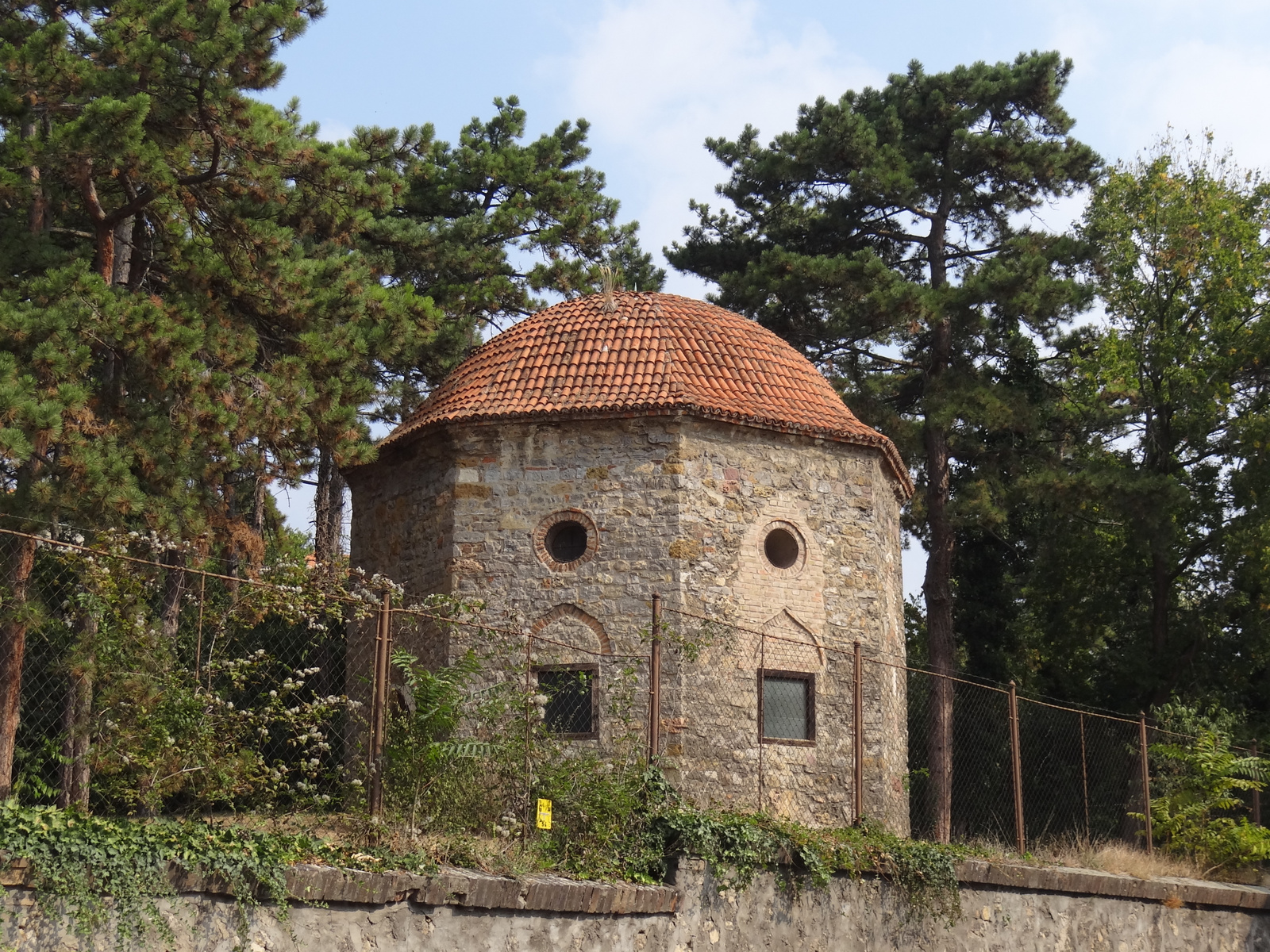
The türbe of Idrisz Baba

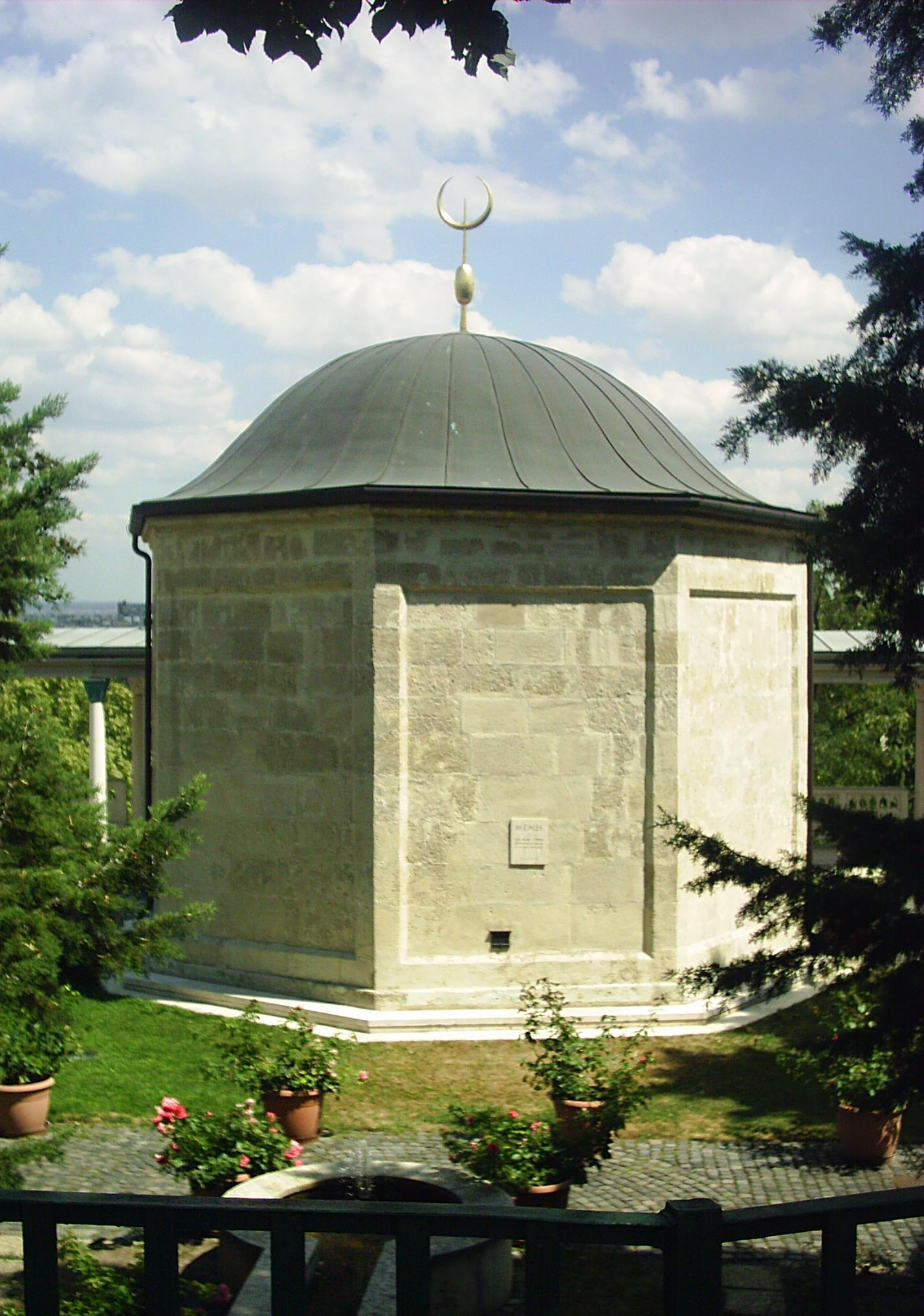
The türbe of Gül Baba

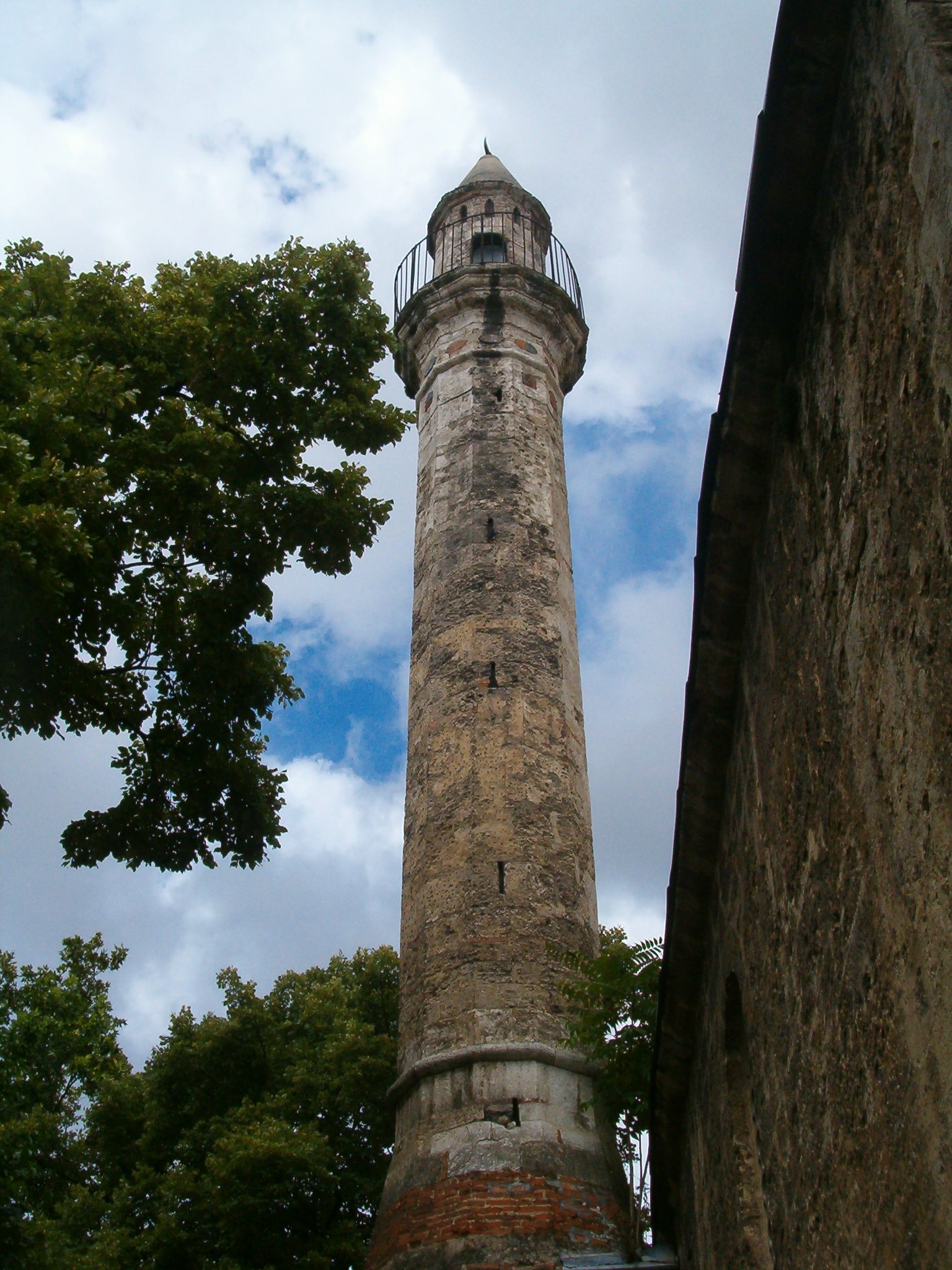
Yakovalı Hasan Paşa minaret in Pécs

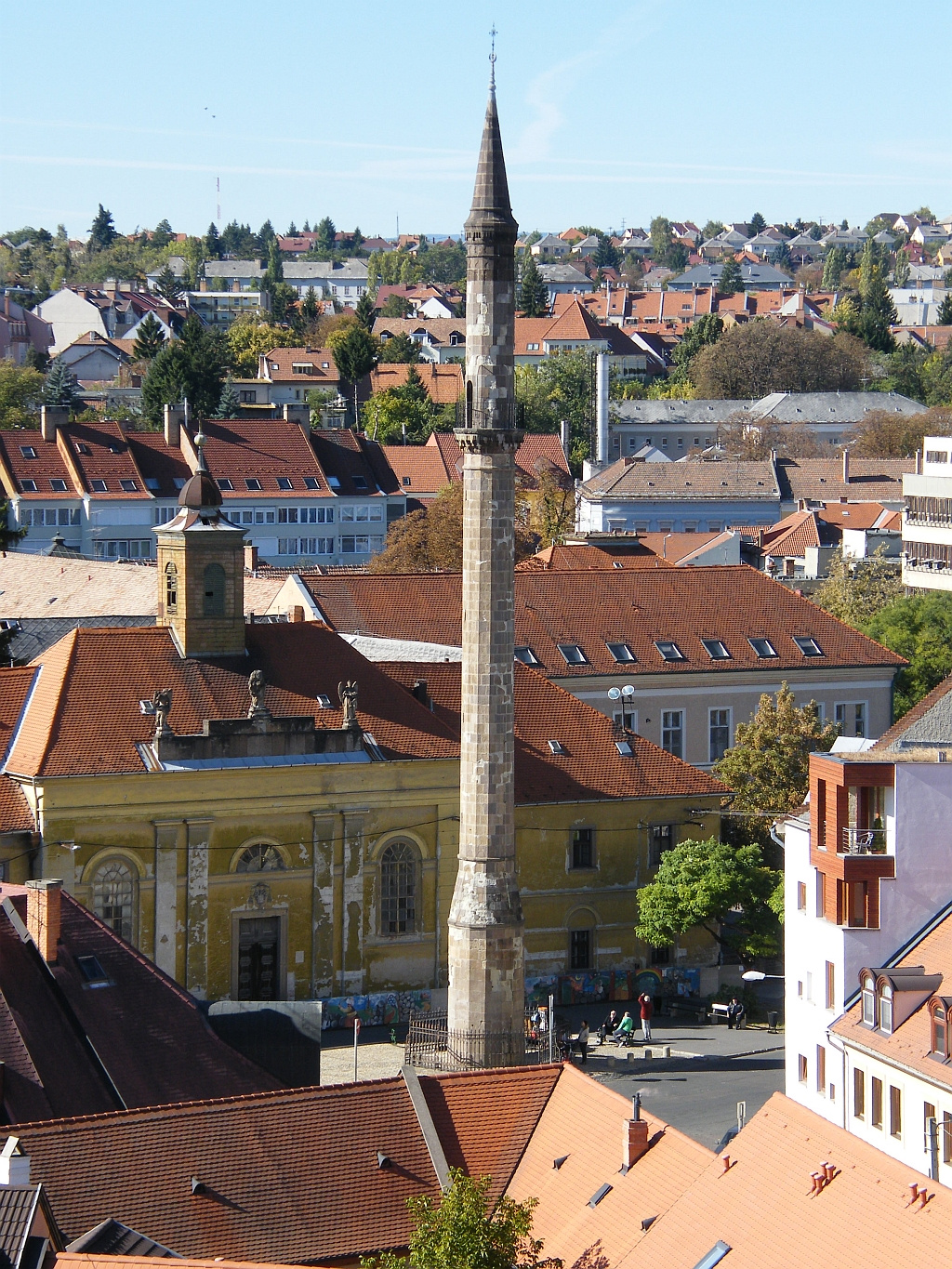
Eger minaret

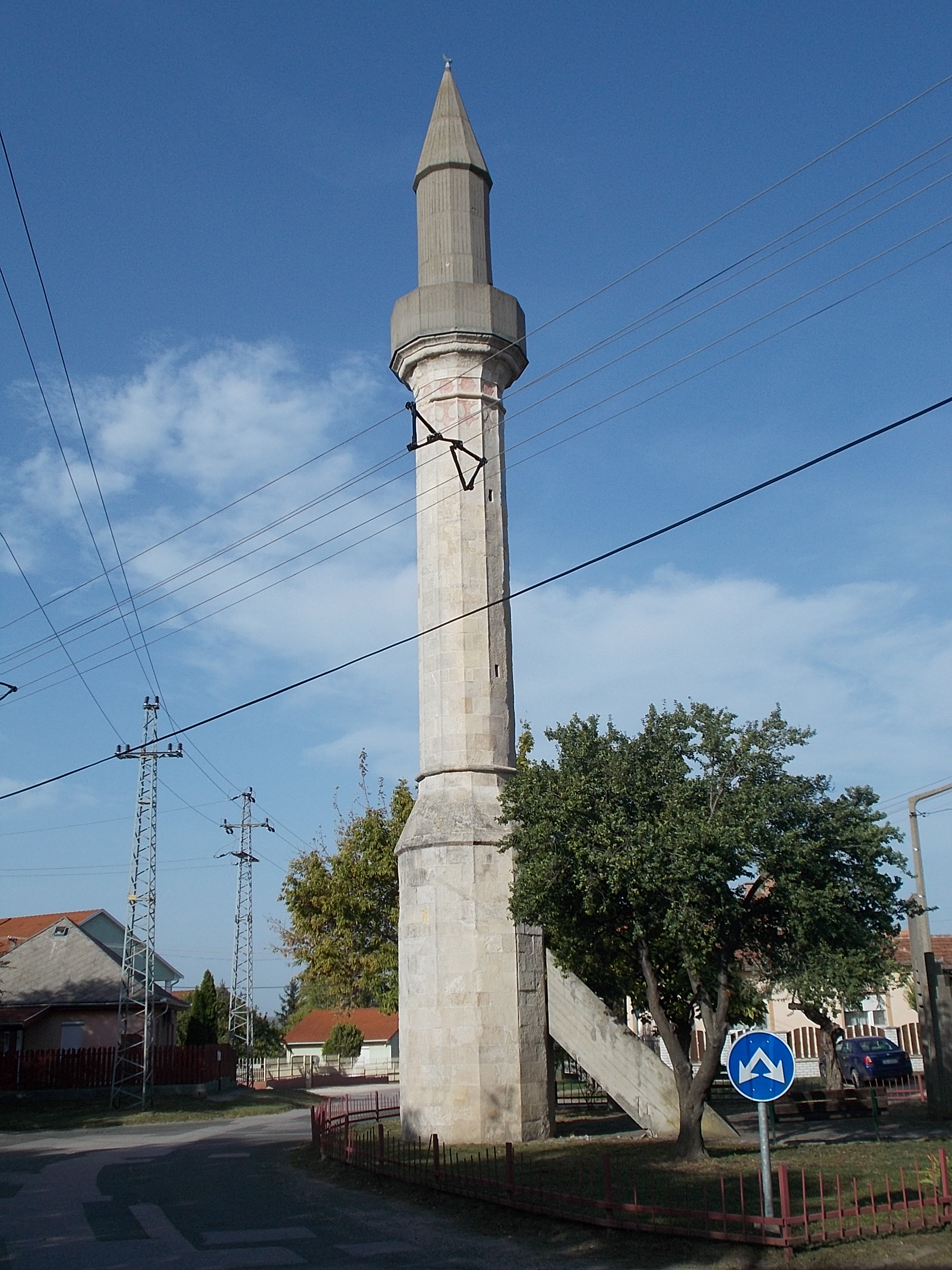
Érd minaret

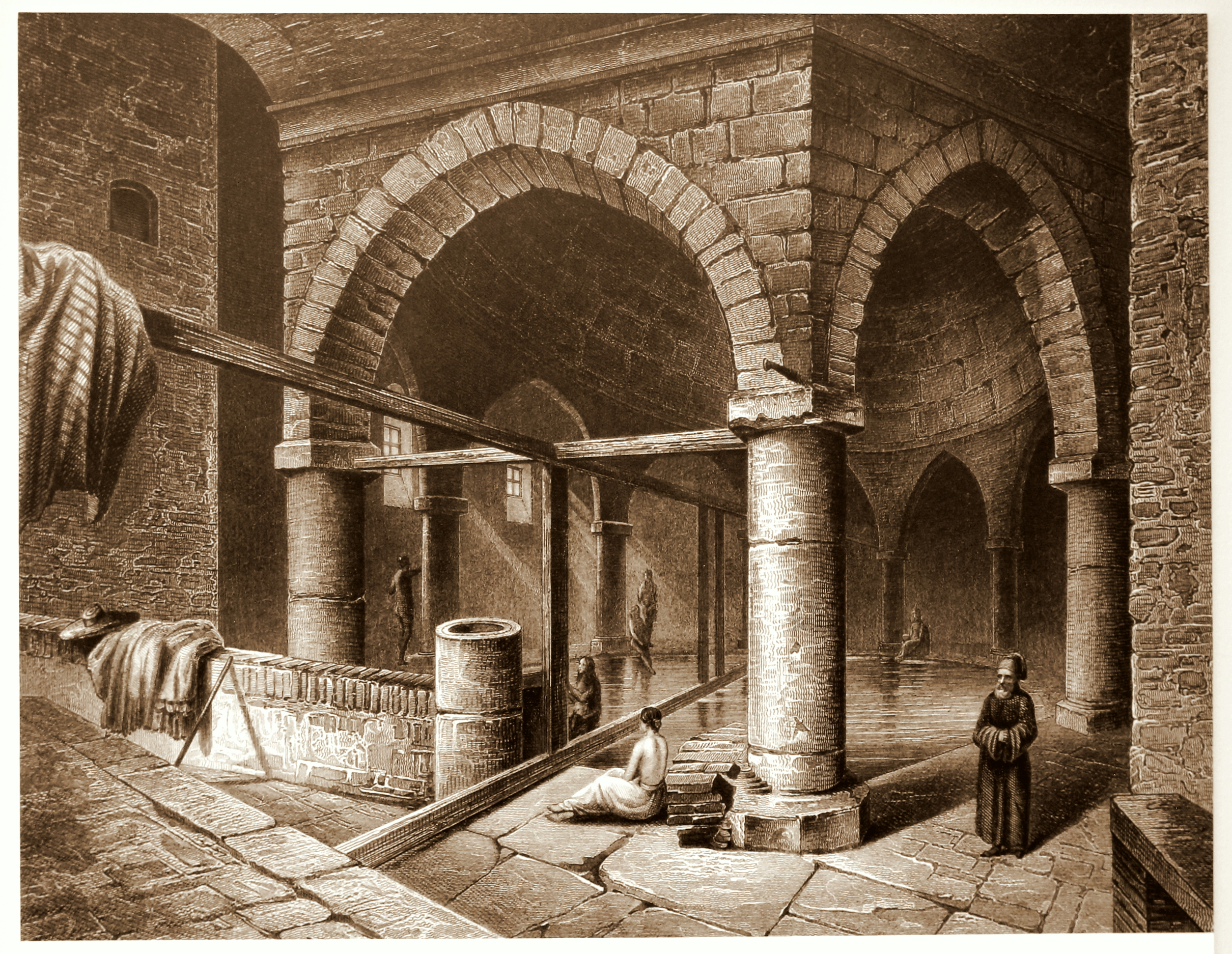
The Rudas Baths in the moment of the Turkish invasion

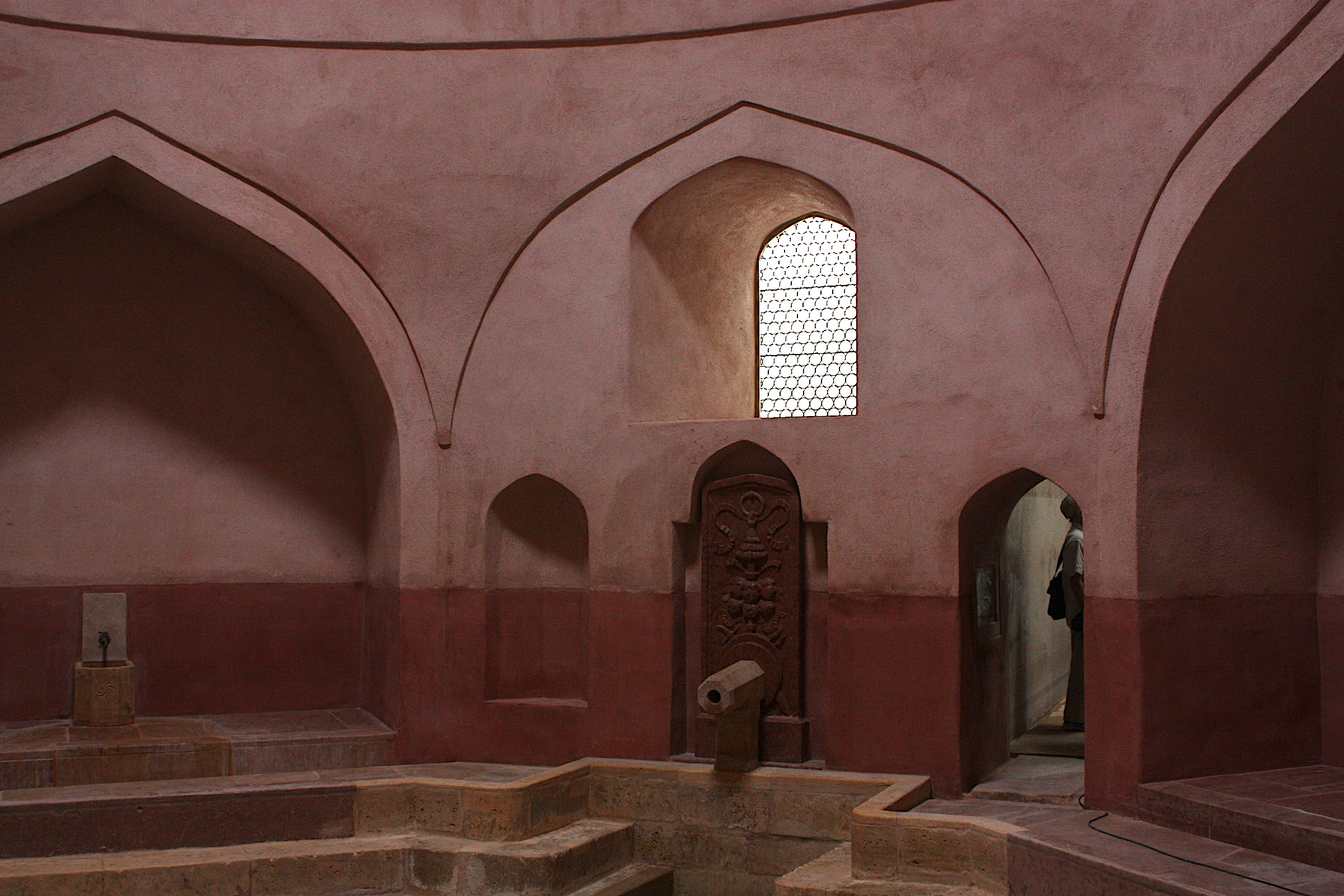
Turkish bath in the Rác Thermal Bath

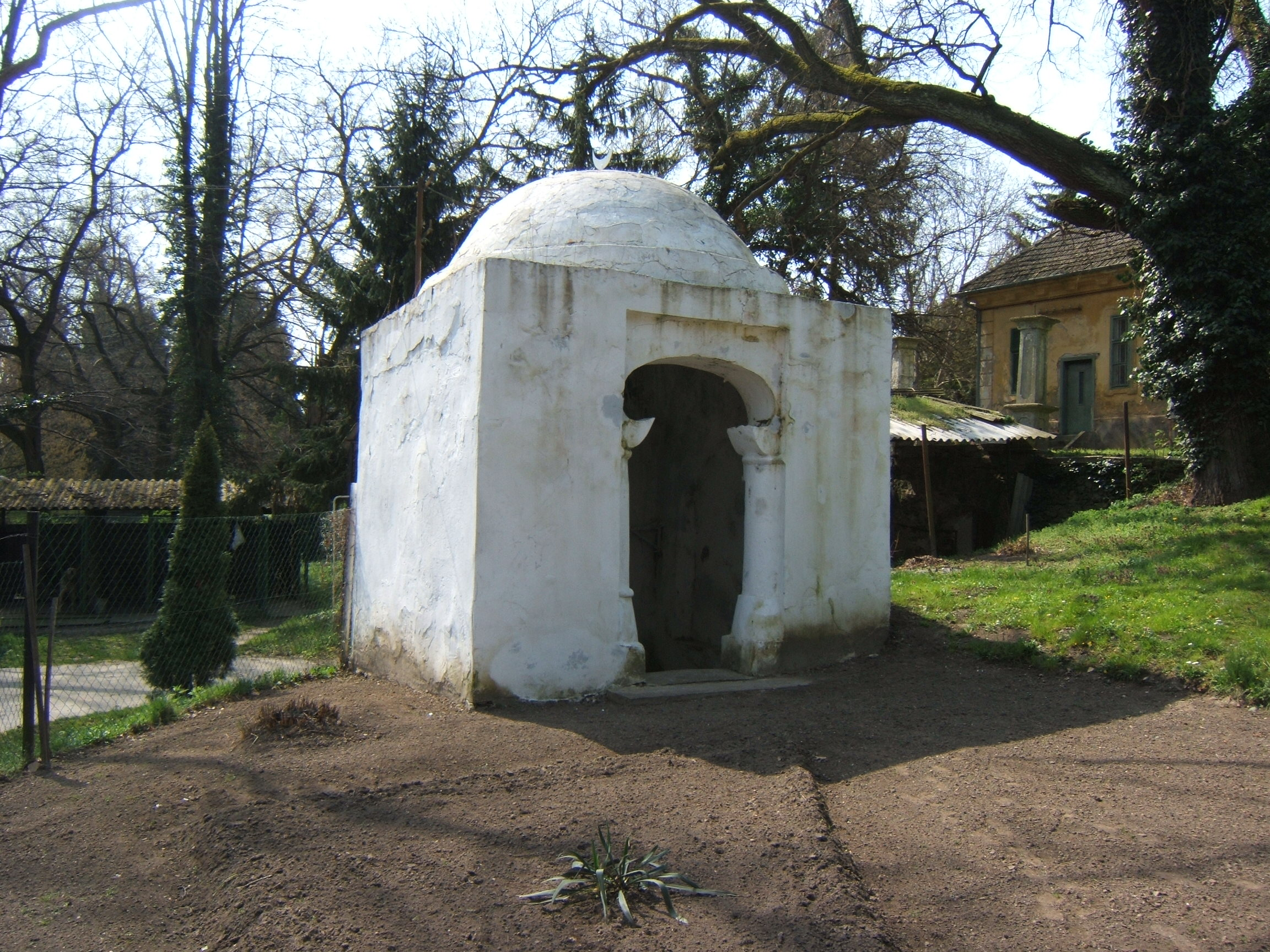
Ottoman well in Babócsa

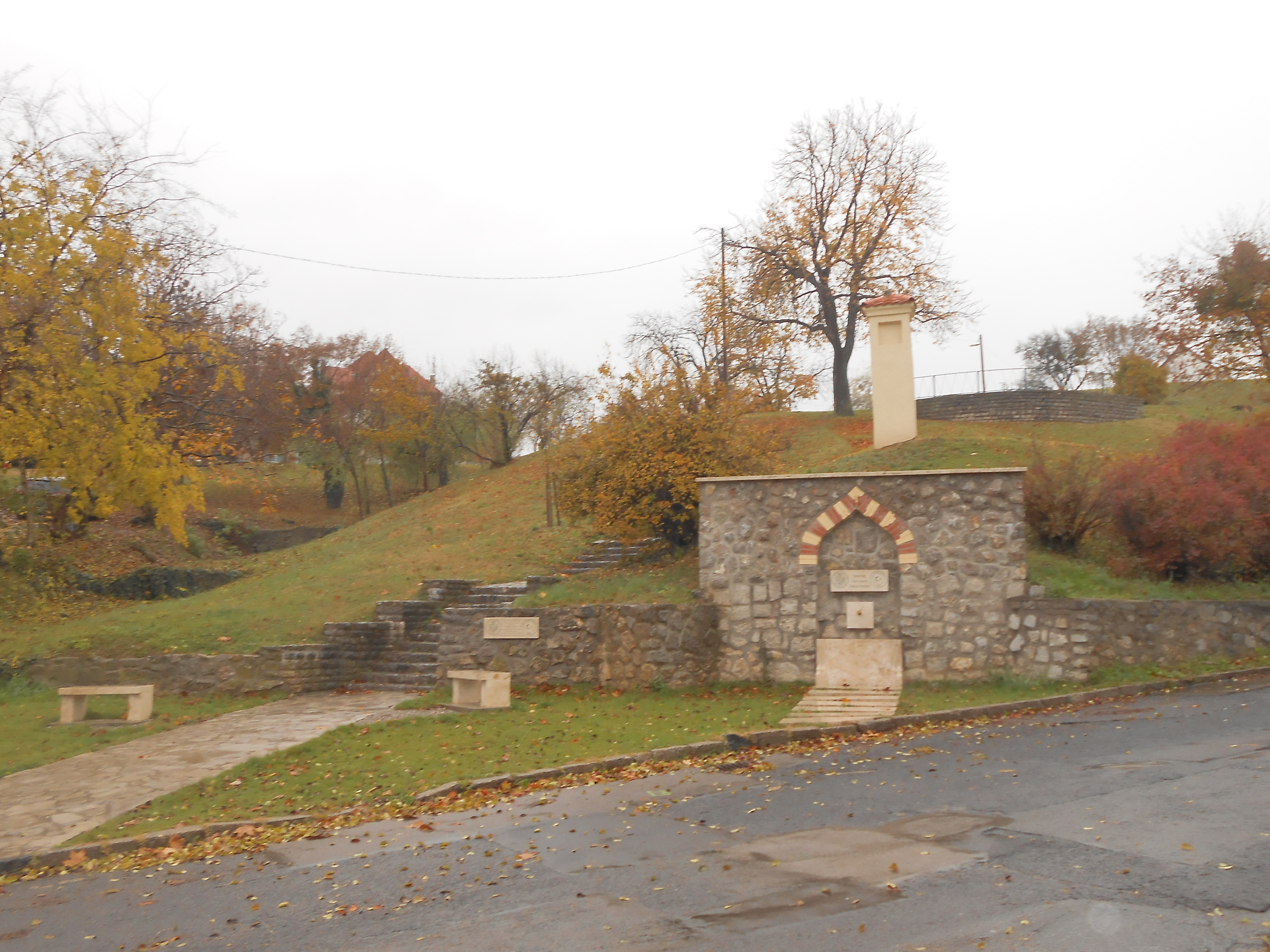
Idrisz Baba's well

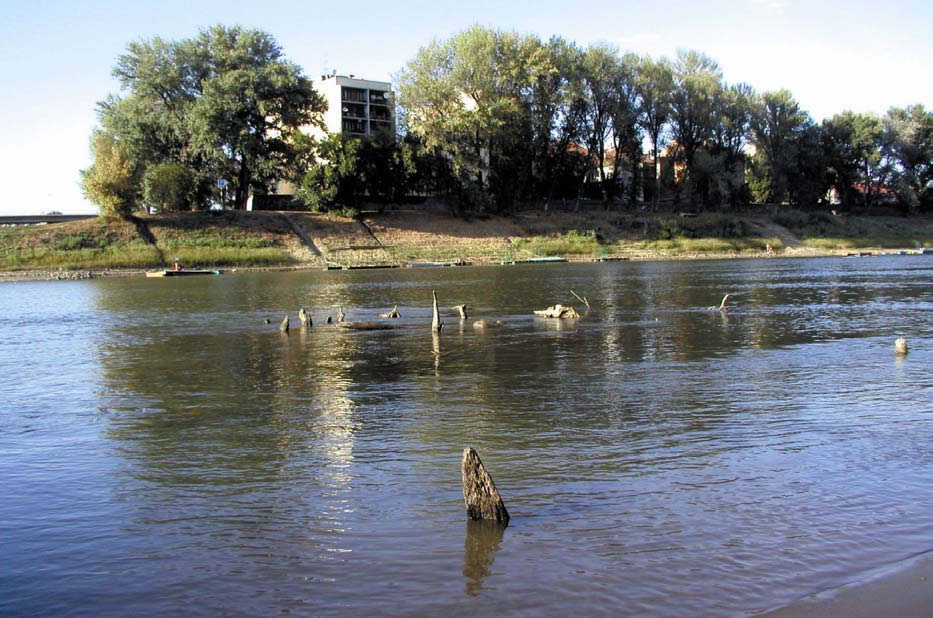
The remains of the Ottoman wooden bridge pile marks in Szolnok

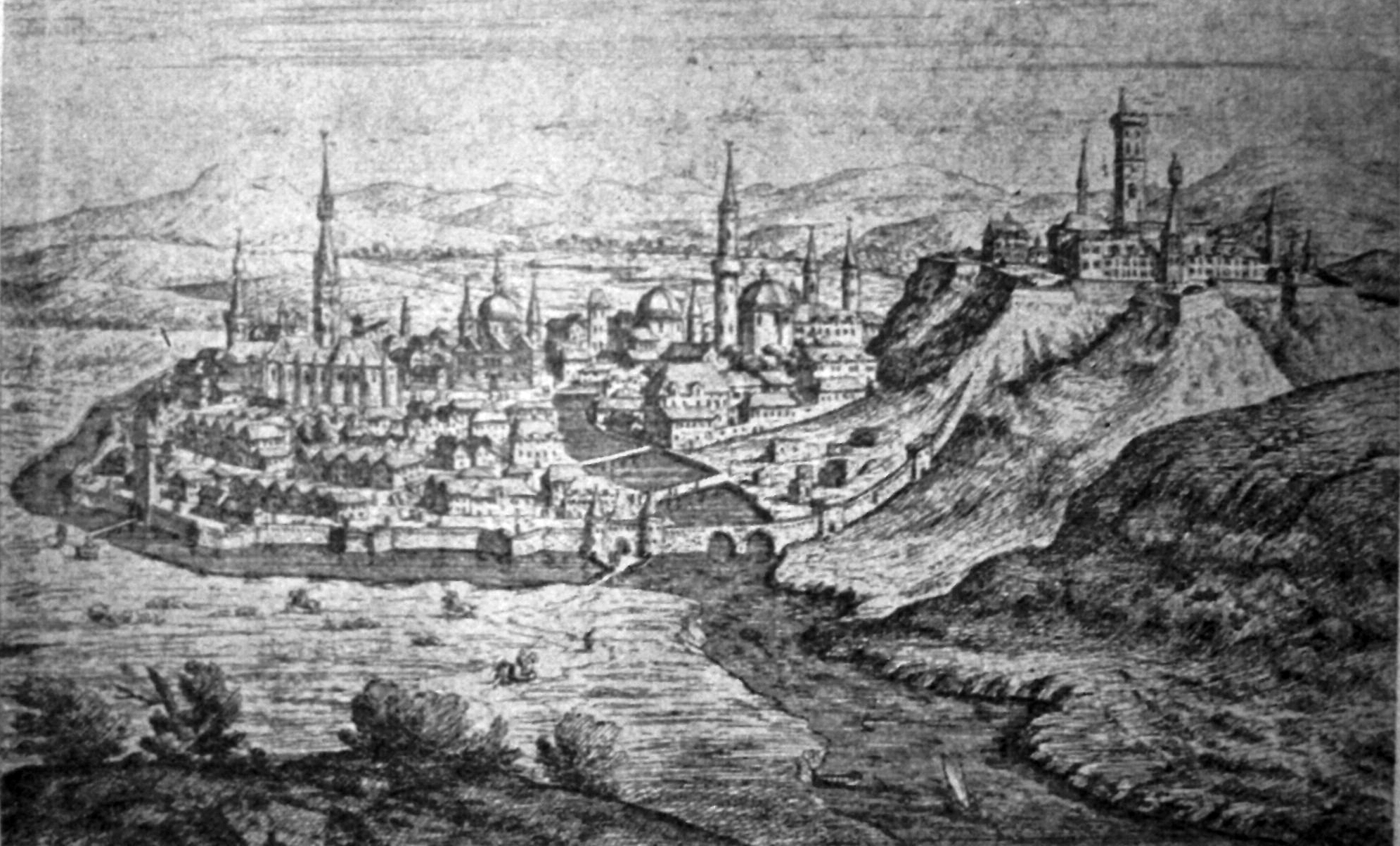
Eger city in 16th century with mosques and minarets

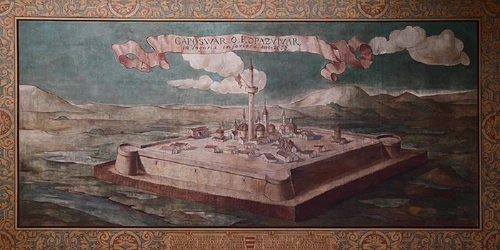
Kaposvár in the 1680s

== Baroque ==
The Baroque art of Hungary has long lived with the late Renaissance. It came in with European currents and was first established in literature following the Péter Pázmány's work. It has a tendency to spread from the west to the east and has been established throughout the country after the expulsion of Turkey.

=== Early Baroque ===
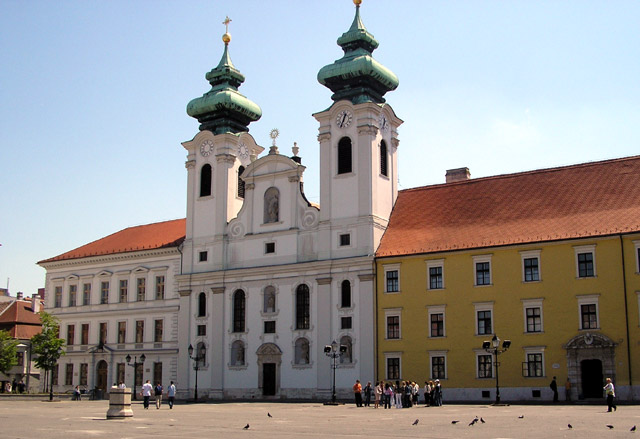
Benedictine Church of St. Ignatius of Loyola in Győr

The intellectual background of the architecture of the 17th century was the Counter-Reformation. Work to meet the needs of the Catholic High Priest and the aristocracy started in the 1620s. The first memory of Baroque architecture in the Kingdom of Hungary was the Jesuit Trnava Cathedral (current Slovakia) designed by Pietro Spazzi. In its arrangement it follows the main church of the Jesuits, the Church of the Gesù of Rome. The monuments of the construction that started in the wake of the Jesuits include the Benedictine Church of St. Ignatius of Loyola, in Győr and the Cathedral Basilica of Győr, the reconstruction of Church of St. George in Sopron and the former Jesuit church in Košice (Slovakia). The architects of the era were usually Italian masters, such as Carlone (1616-1667), Martinelli (1684-1747). The Hungarian Baroque church architecture is characterised by prominent towers and gates, with windows lit by side nave.

The castle architecture followed the traditions of the previous century (Markušovce, Rechnitz, Deutschkreutz). The first Baroque castle was built for Paul I, Prince Esterházy in Eisenstadt (current Austria) by Italian architect Carlone. The castle architecture, however, only emerged after the Turkish fighting. The Savoy Castle in Ráckeve (1700-1702) was first built according to the plans of Johann Lukas von Hildebrandt. Its U-shaped plan, which will be the center of the castle (cour d'honneur), is completely different from the former castle types. The main line of the castle architecture followed this, but the French pattern was followed from the 1720s to 1730s.

=== 18th century Baroque ===
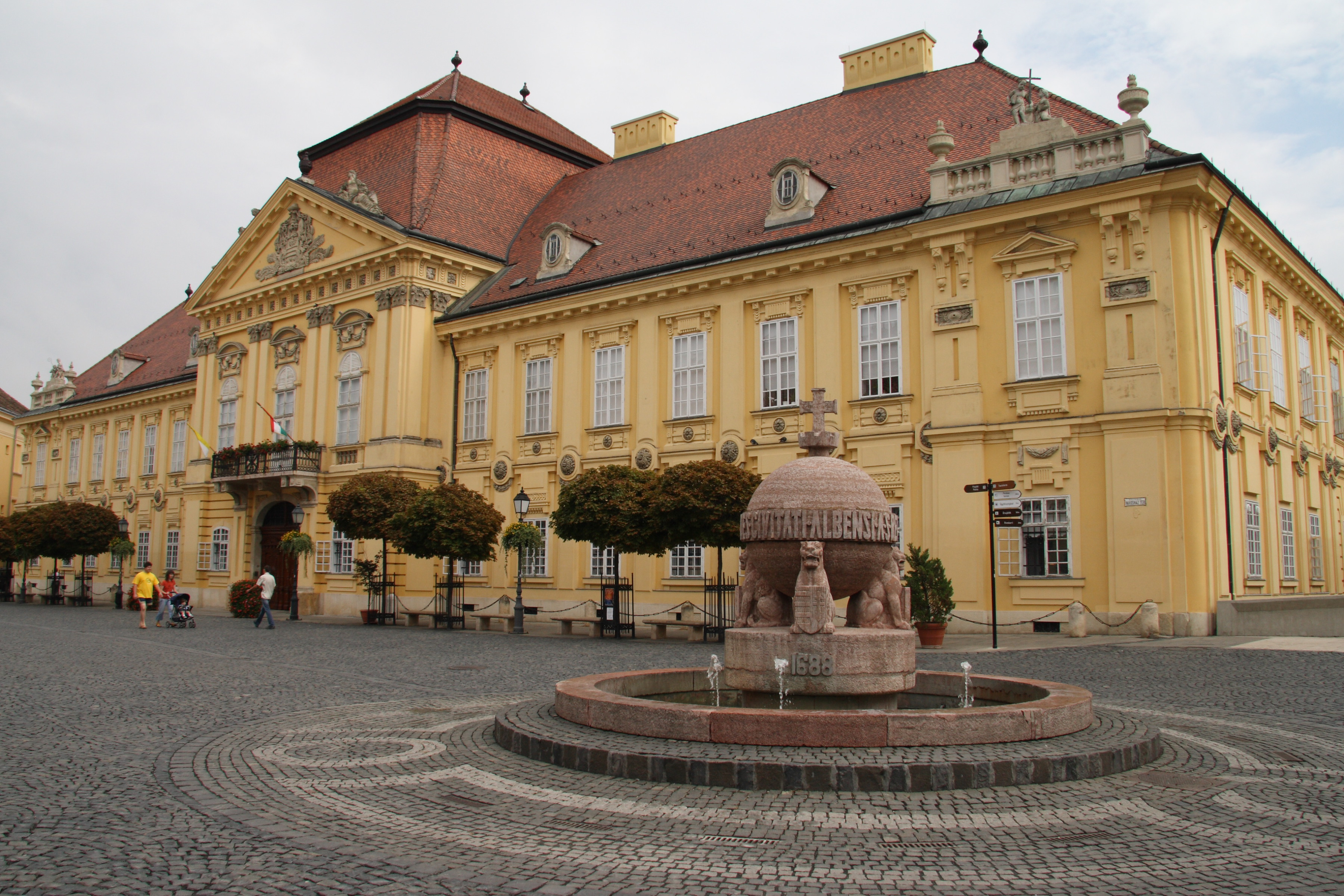
Bishop's palace of Székesfehérvár

In the beginning, secular architecture was oppressed by church construction, such as the Carmelite Church in Győr, the Jesuit church of Trenčín (current Slovakia), the University Church in Pest, etc. In addition, most of the churches of the Great Hungarian Plain were built on the remains of earlier churches (Kiskunfélegyháza, Kecskemét). The peak of the Baroque secular architecture, took place in the second half of the 18th century. At the request of Queen Maria Theresa, the reconstruction of the Royal palace of Buda began with the assistance of Jadot (1710-1797), Ignác Oracsek (1750-1770) and Franz Anton Hillebrandt (1719-1797). The Bishop's palaces were built with church money, including in Oradea (Romania), Vác, Szombathely, Székesfehérvár and Kalocsa.

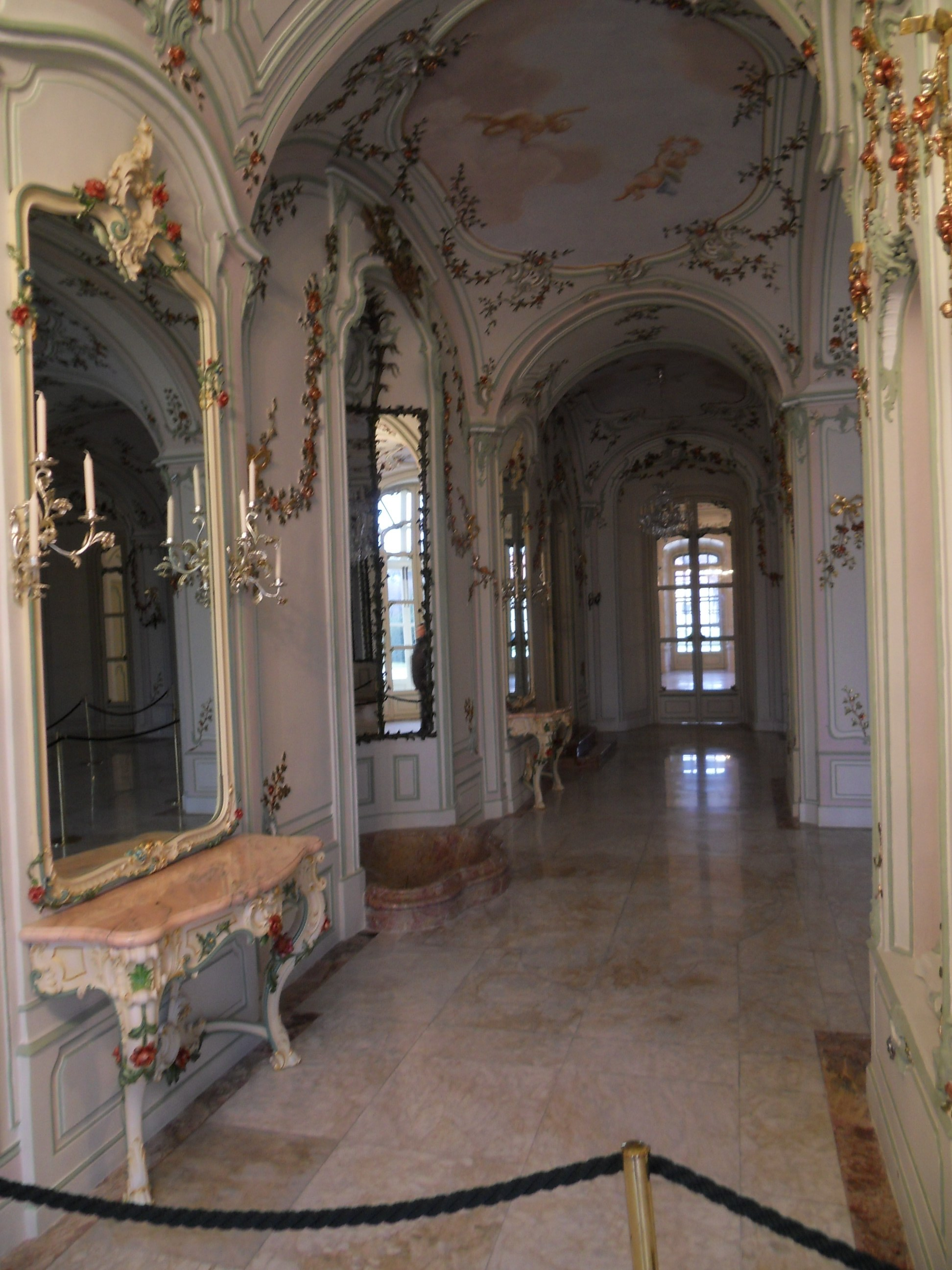
The interiors of the Eszterháza in Fertőd are of Rococo style, built between 1720-1766.

Among the most well-known churches built under the mature Baroque include the Franz Anton Pilgrim's Church designed by Jászó, the Minorite Church in Eger and the Parish of Saint Anne in Buda. The Cistercian church of Székesfehérvár was built by 1756, with the most valuable Rococo furniture in Hungary in the sacristy. At the same time, the very rich Basilica of St. Stephen, rebuilt by Queen Maria Theresa, was completed by 1771, which became the Cathedral of the Diocese of Székesfehérvár from 1777. In the construction of the church, there is mainly a Southern influence, while in secular architecture the French influence has increased, this can be seen in the Eszterháza in Fertőd, which is the splendour of the palace of Versailles, where the Rococo is already present. One of the most outstanding and beautiful examples of late Baroque castle architecture in Hungary is the Royal Palace of Gödöllő. The effect of the castle is well illustrated by the fact that the Royal Palace of Gödöllő style has also been talked about since then, which has affected, among other things, the city lord palaces. Baroque houses remains in Eger, Buda Quarter, Sopron and Veszprém. At this time, the builders were mostly Hungarian masters. The Baroque began to affect village architecture, and the folk-style peasant Baroque was formed. The late Baroque Ponytail style is reflected in the works of Melchior Hefele and Jakab Fellner, such as the Archbishop's Palace of Veszprém, the Cathedral and Bishop's palace of Szombathely, the Bishop's palace of Székesfehérvár, the Church of St. Stephen in Pápa or the Líceum of Eger. Classical elements such as the tympanum and the Ionic column began to spread.

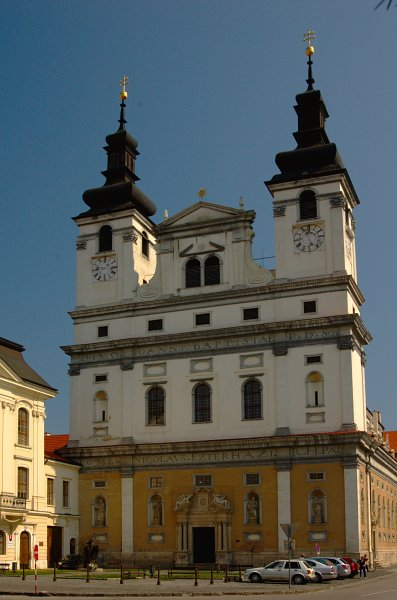
Trnava Cathedral, now Slovakia

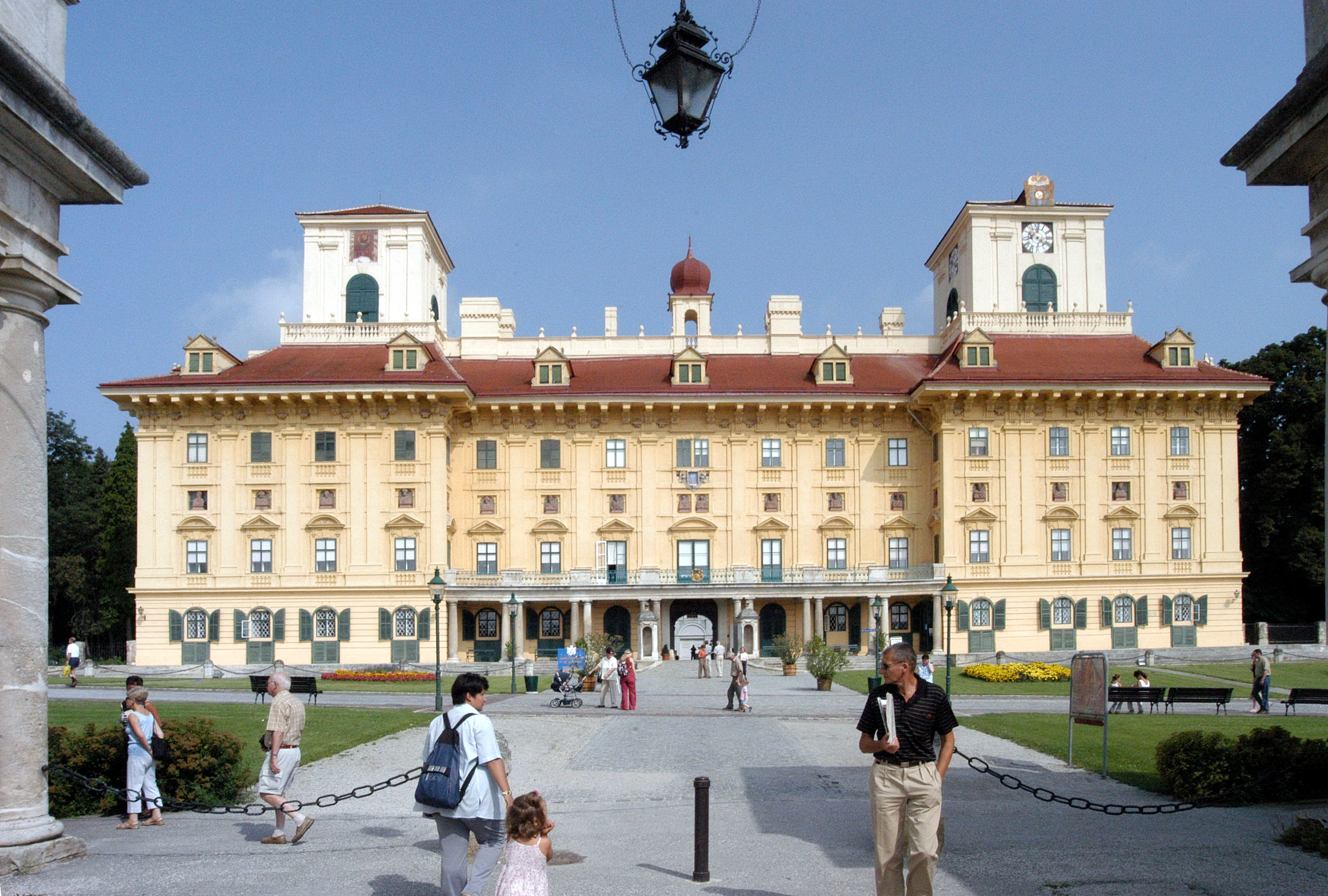
Esterházy Palace in Eisenstadt, now Austria

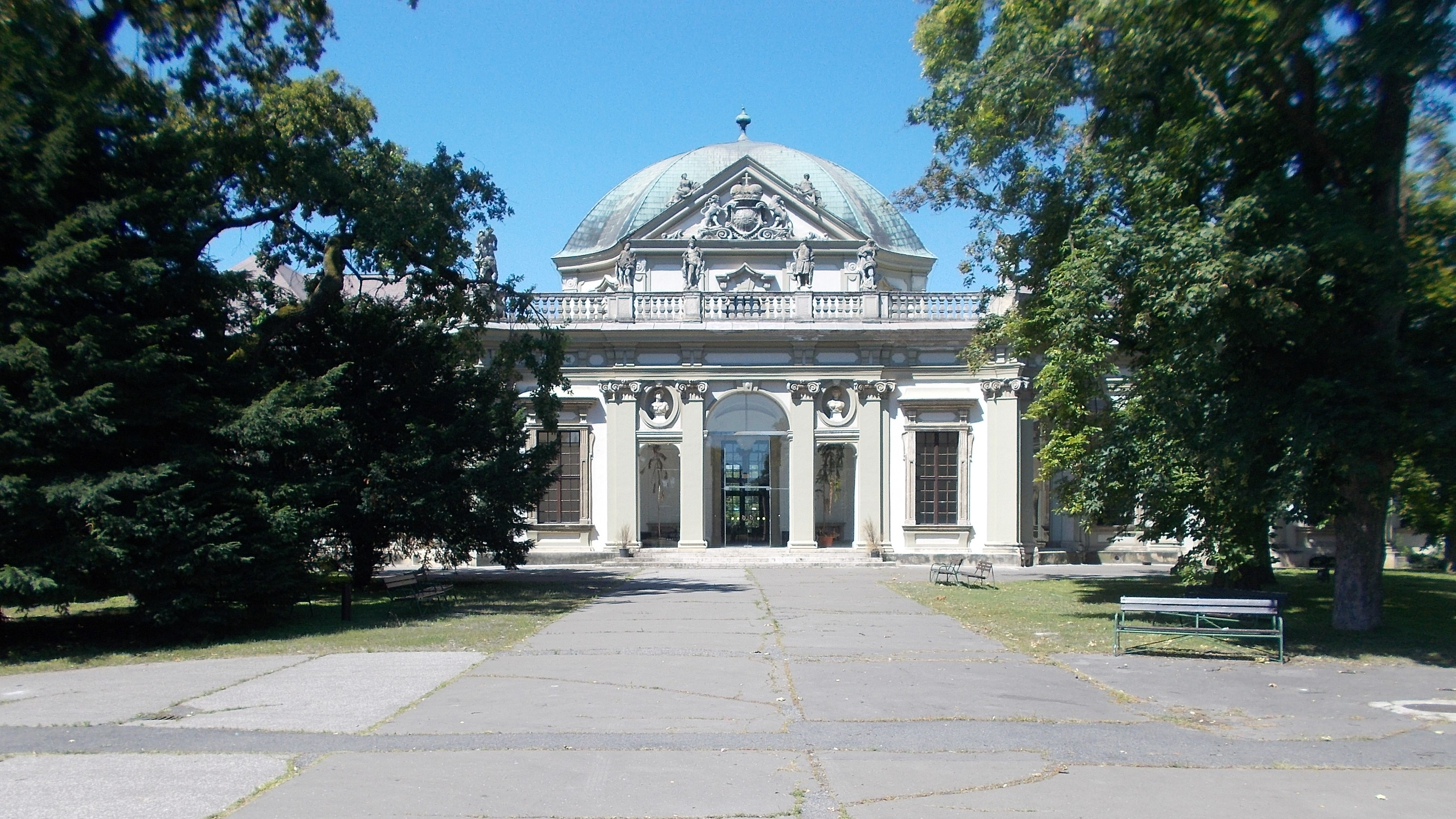
Savoy Castle in Ráckeve

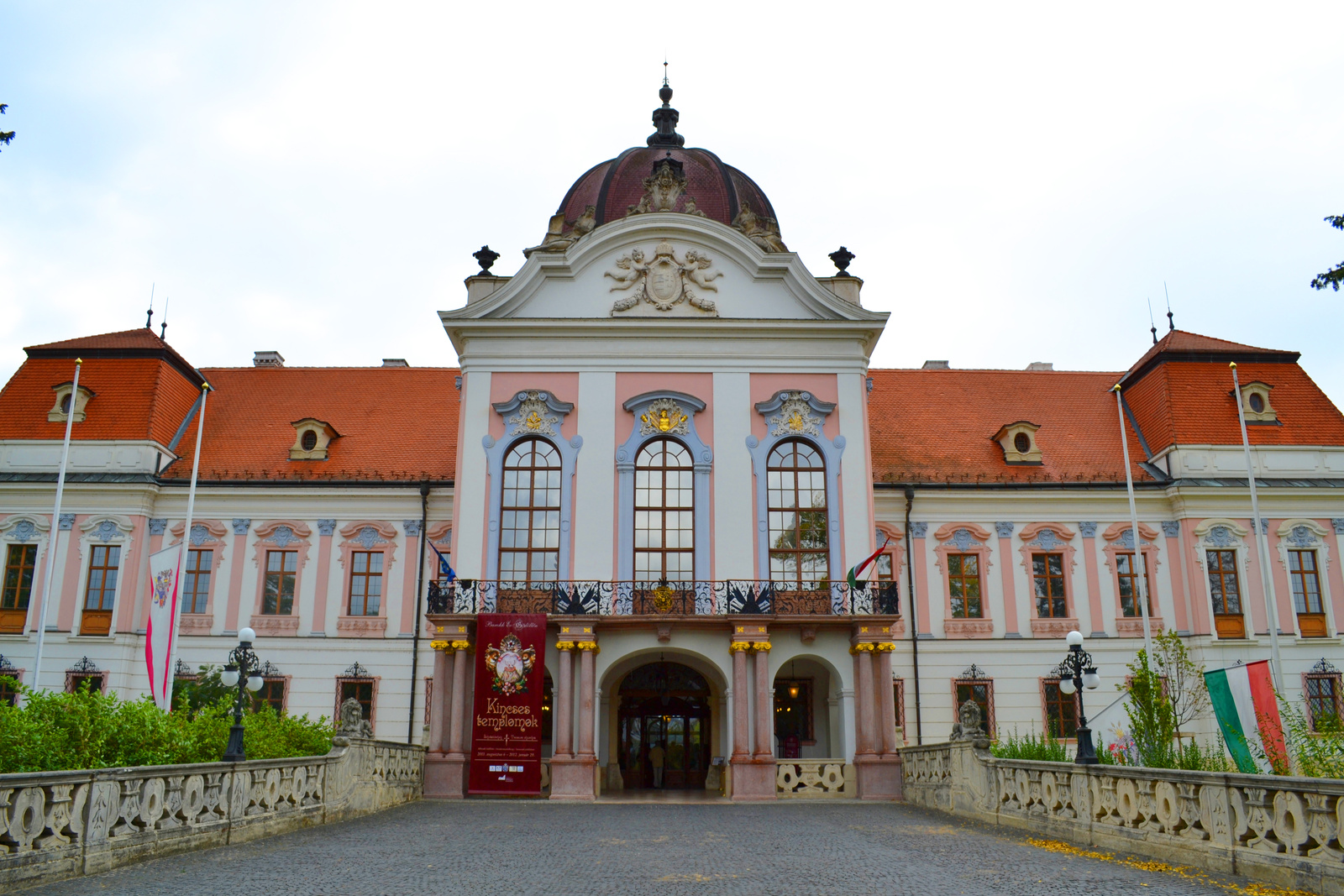
The Royal Palace of Gödöllő

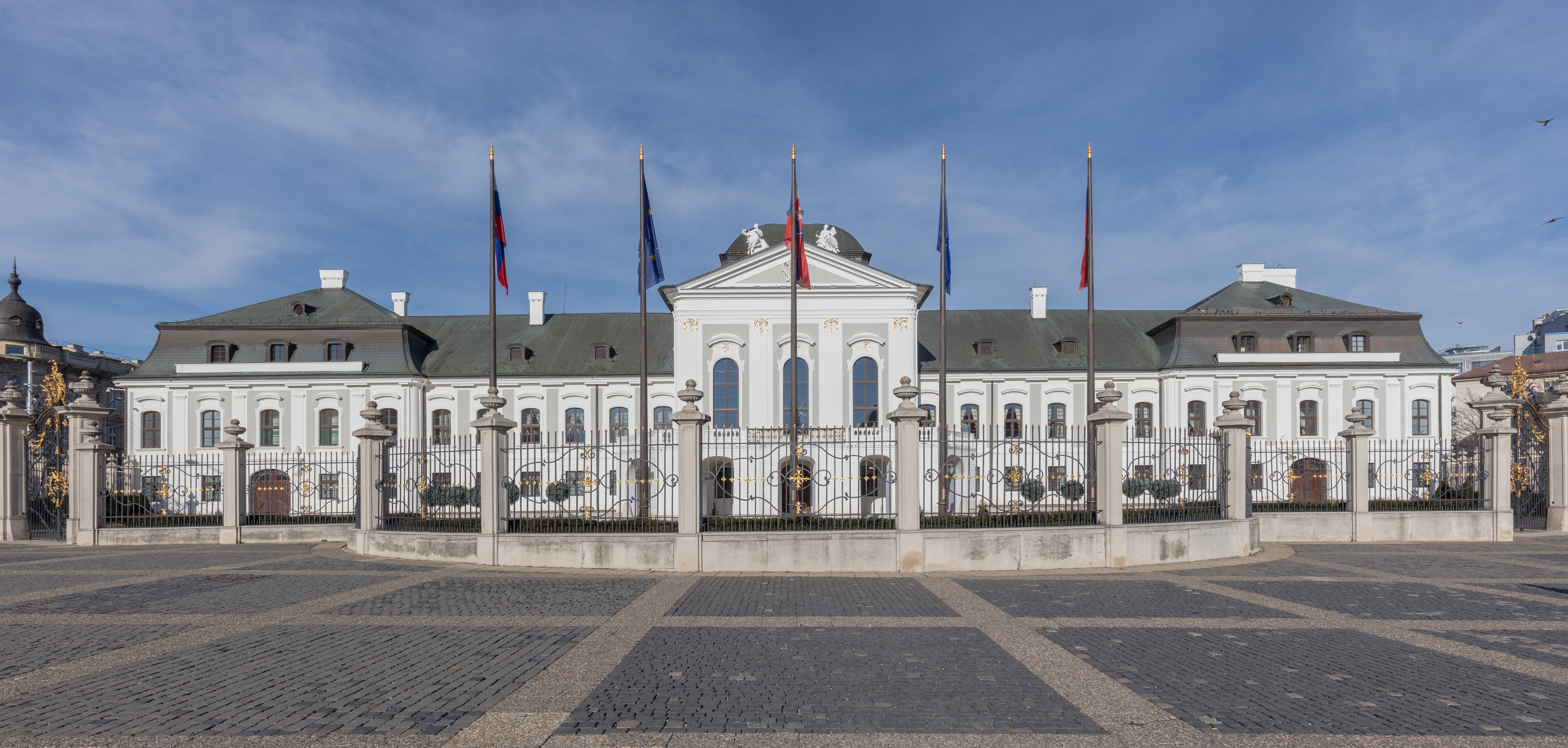
Grassalkovich Palace in Bratislava, now Slovakia

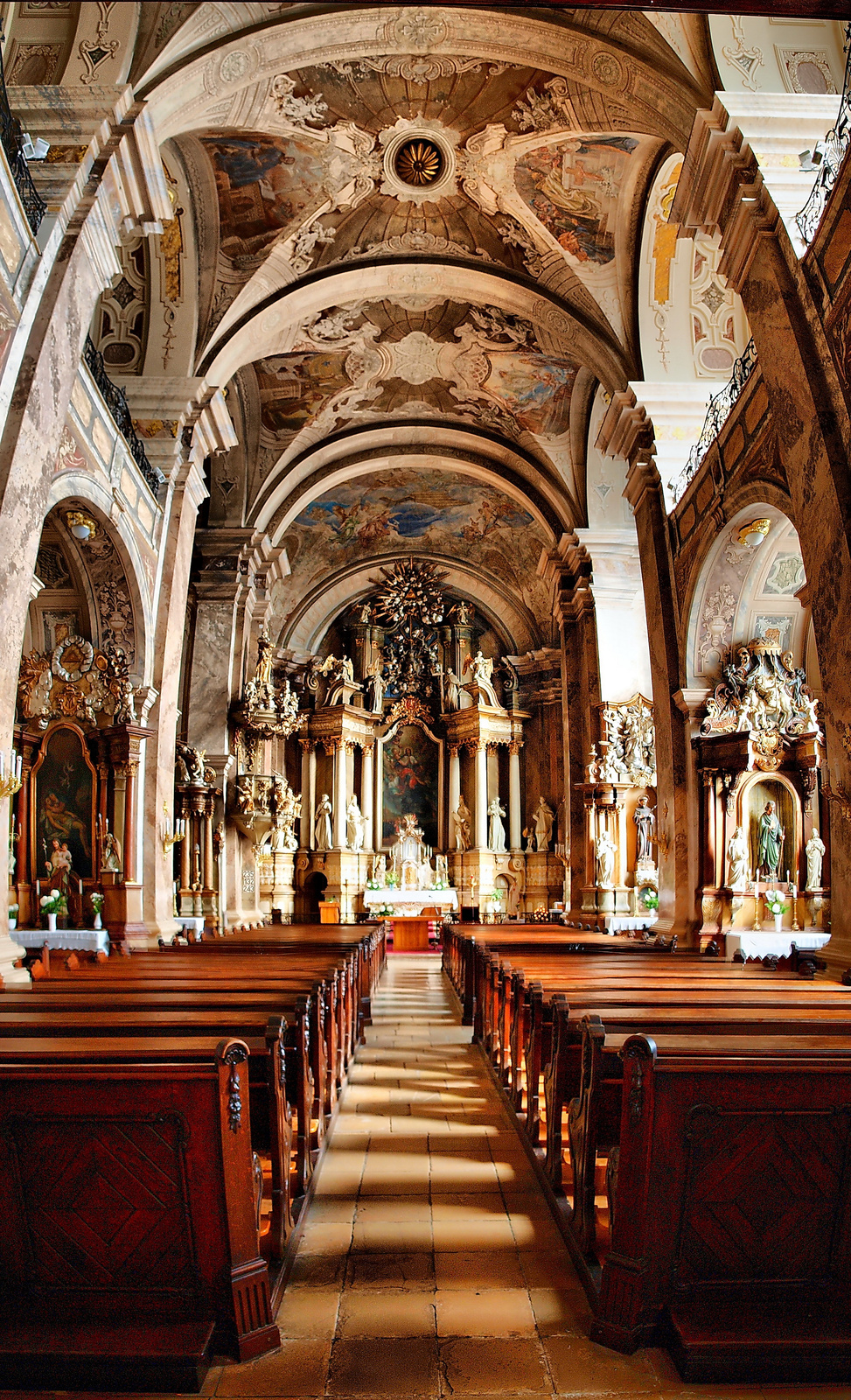
Interior of the Church of St. Emeric of Székesfehérvár

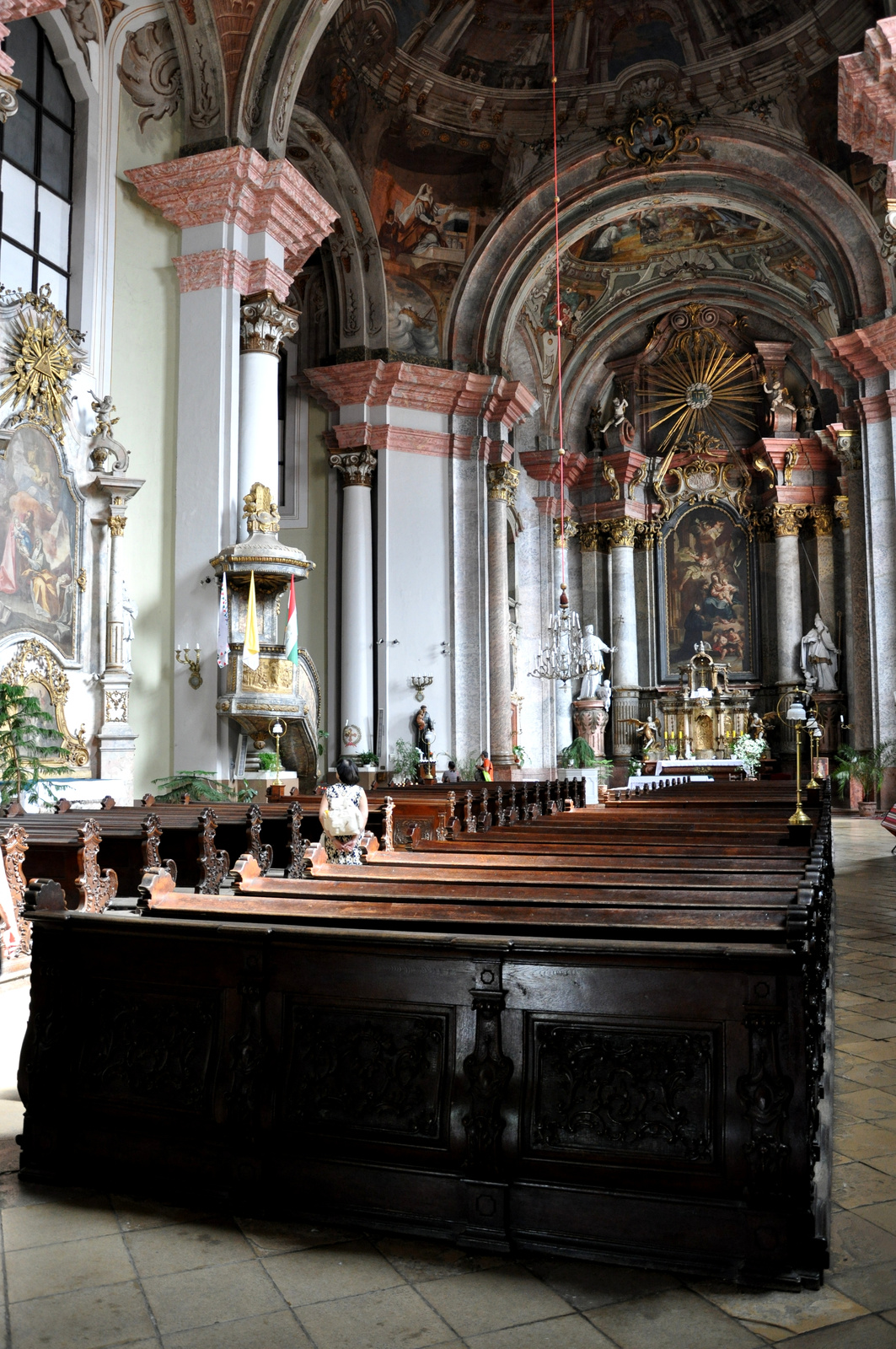
Interior of the Minorite Church of Eger

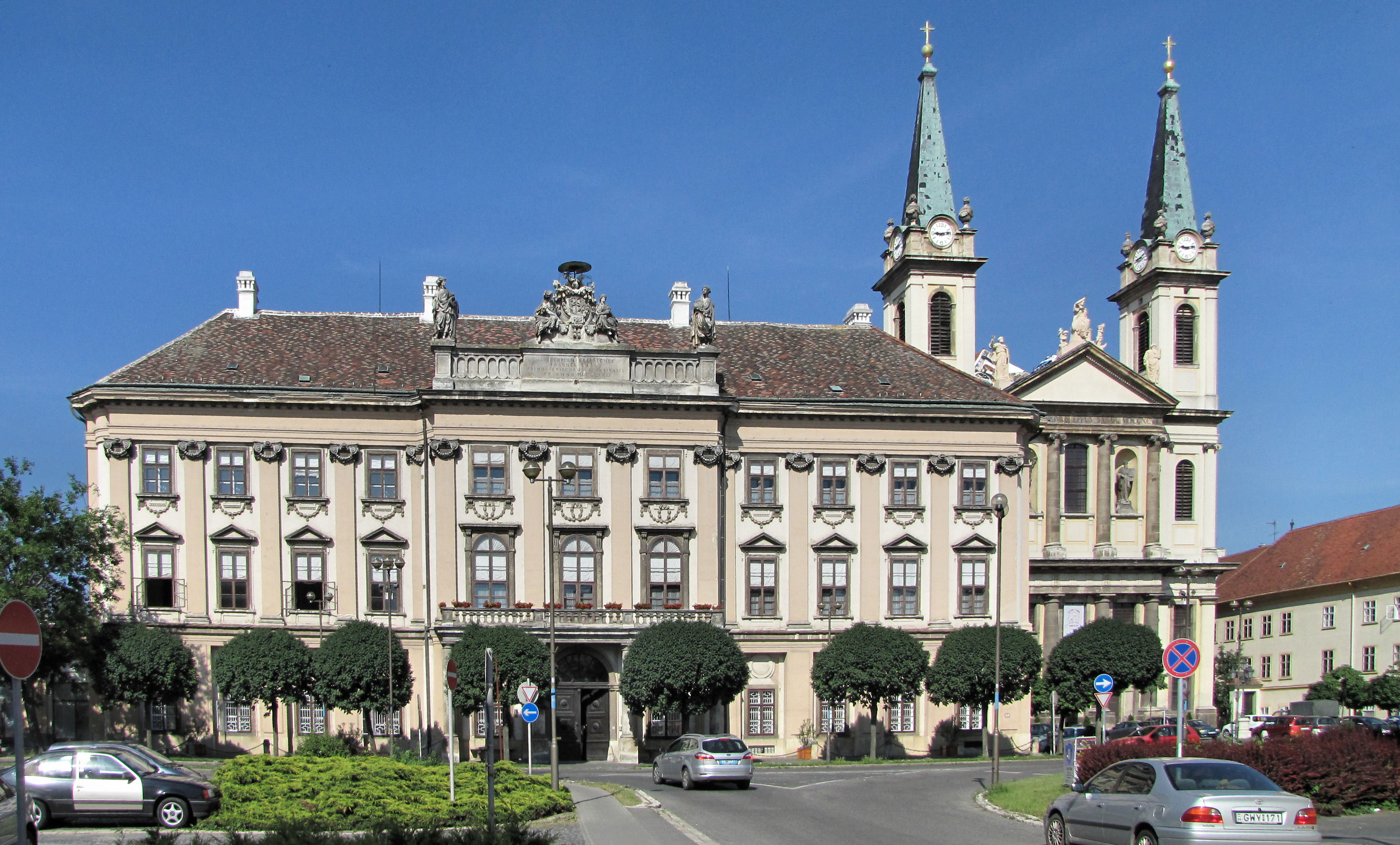
The Cathedral and Bishop's palace of Szombathely

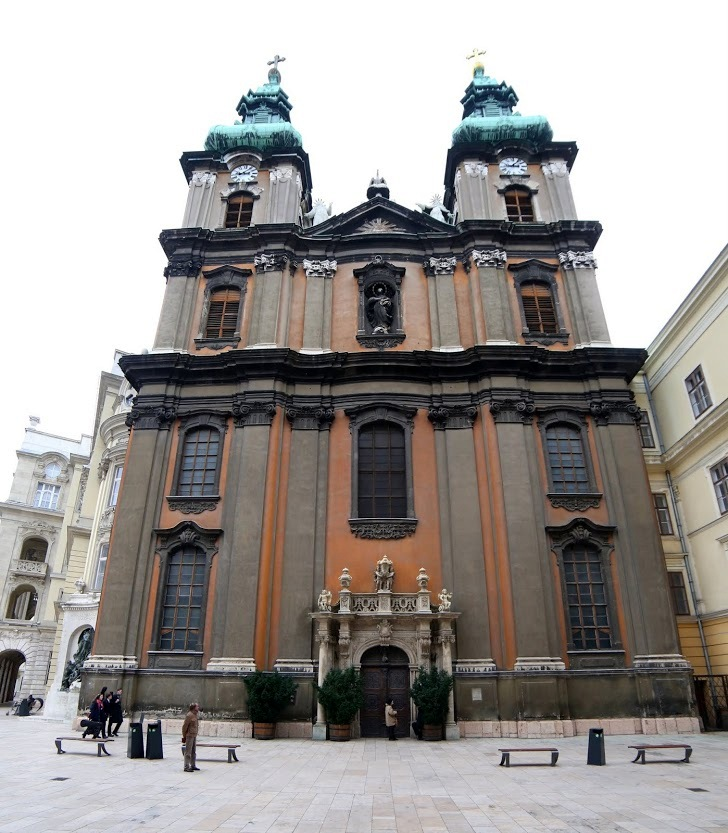
The University Church in Pest

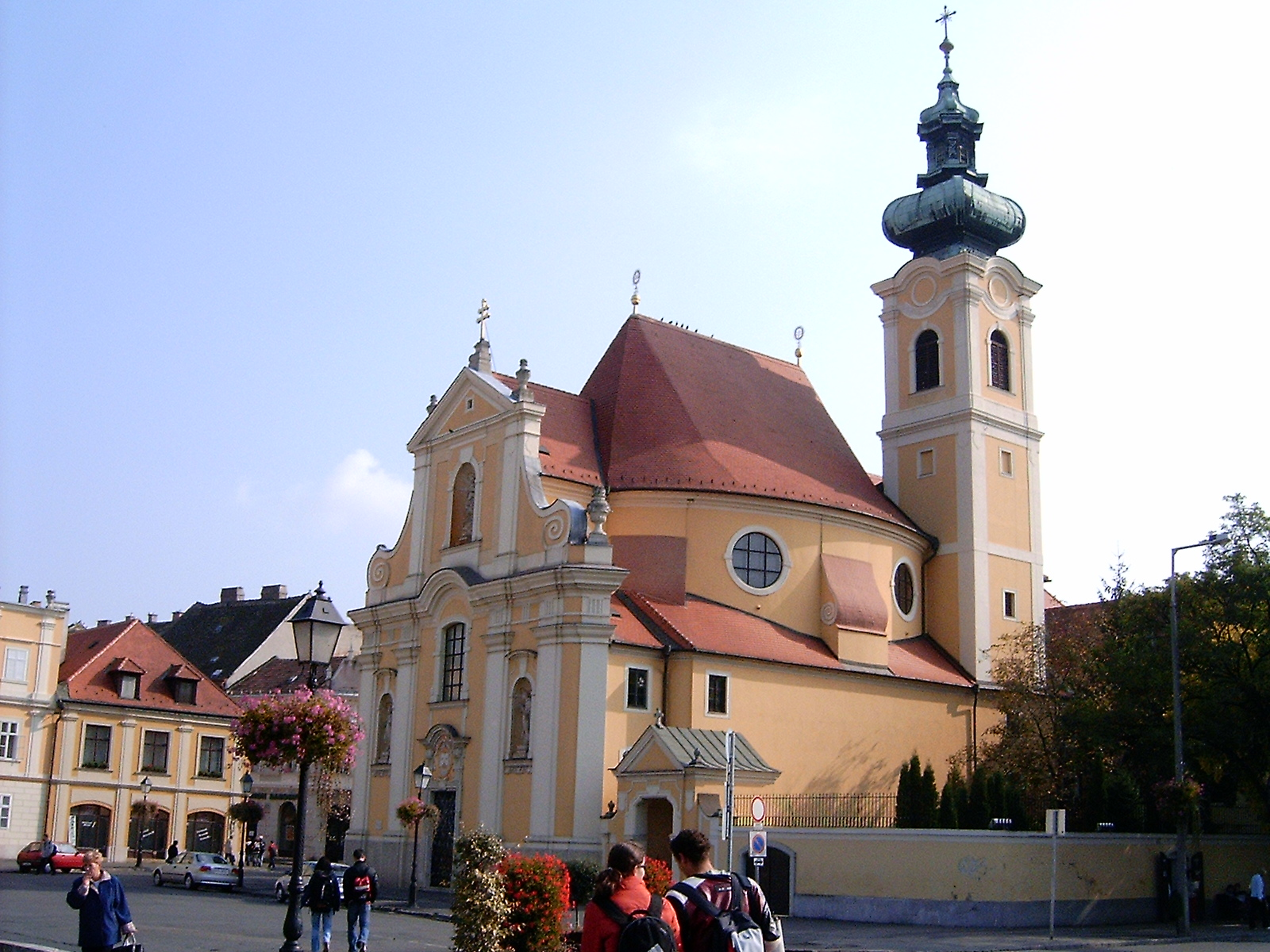
The Carmelite Church of Győr

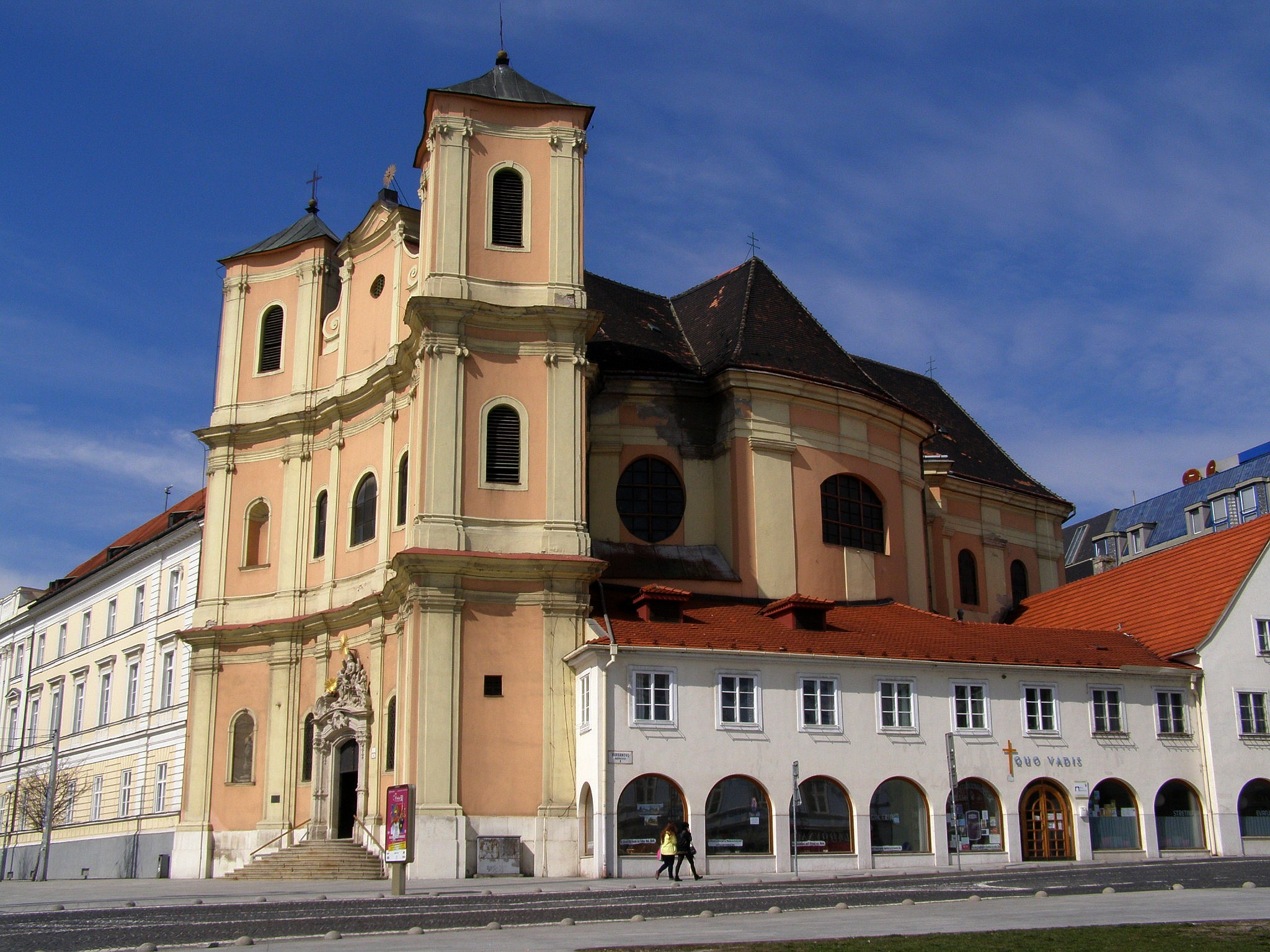
Trinitarian Church in Bratislava, now Slovakia

== In the 19th century ==
=== In the first half of the 19th century ===
The Hungarian architecture of the first half of the 19th century was dictated by the Classicist form of a particular national version. The evolving national consciousness took shape in this style. Ferenc Kazinczy's work has spread and become a popular style of the tablet world. After the development of Pest as a city, in 1808, Archduke Joseph, Palatine of Hungary set up the Beautification Committee. The committee, operating until 1857, ensured the urban design of new construction sites and the style unit, thereby facilitating the civil approach to the Classical music. The buildings were characterised by puritanism, sobriety, moderation in form. The increase of mansions, row houses, public buildings began. The first major building was designed by Mihály Péchy (1755-1819) the Reformed Great Church of Debrecen. In the decades before the reform, two leading masters took his place, Mihály Pollack (1773-1855) and József Hild (1789-1867). They played the leading role in the Hungarian Reform Era as well. Pollack's first solo work was the Lutheran Church in Deák square, Budapest, then designed several palaces and castles. Its main work is the building of the Hungarian National Museum, which occupies a significant place in Europe. Hild's operation defined the Classicist image of the emerging capital (Lloyd's palace, Tänzer House) and also performed church orders (Cathedral Basilica of Eger). The construction of Mátyás Zitterbarth (1803-1867), Ferenc Kasselik (1795-1884), József Hofrichter (1779-1835) in Pest is more important. Near Pest and Buda, the main centre of Classicist construction was Esztergom. The Esztergom Basilica was built, initially based on the plans of János Packh (1796-1839), which was finally completed by József Hild. Classicist houses were built all over the country, sometimes provincial.

From the middle of the 19th century, the effect of Romanticism has been stayed, which has already used Oriental elements. Its leading master became Frigyes Feszl (1821-1884). He attempted to create Hungarian national architecture for the first time, using Moorish and Byzantine elements. His main work became Vigadó of Pest, which is also an outstanding work of European Romanticism.

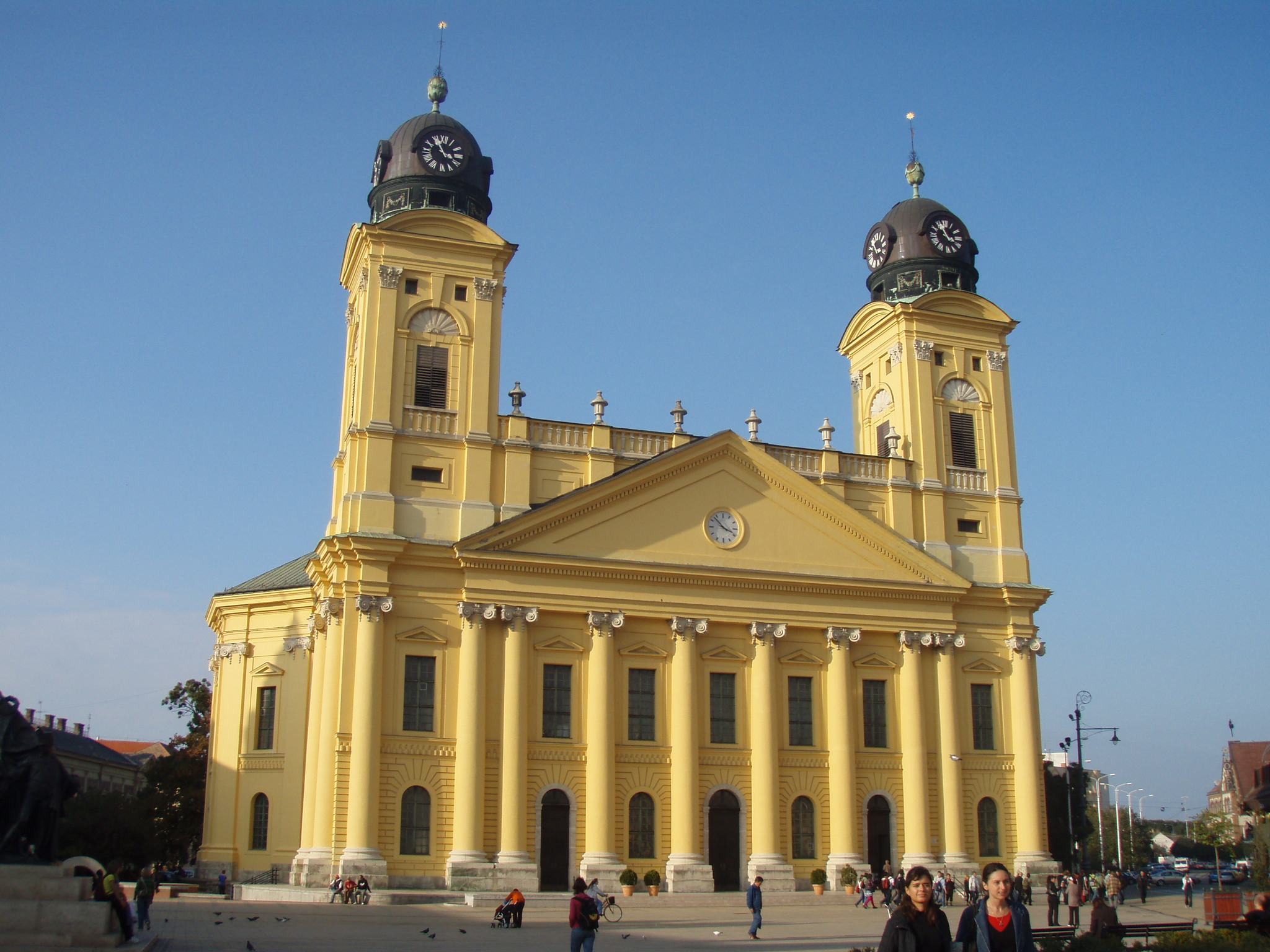
Reformed Great Church of Debrecen (1805-1824)

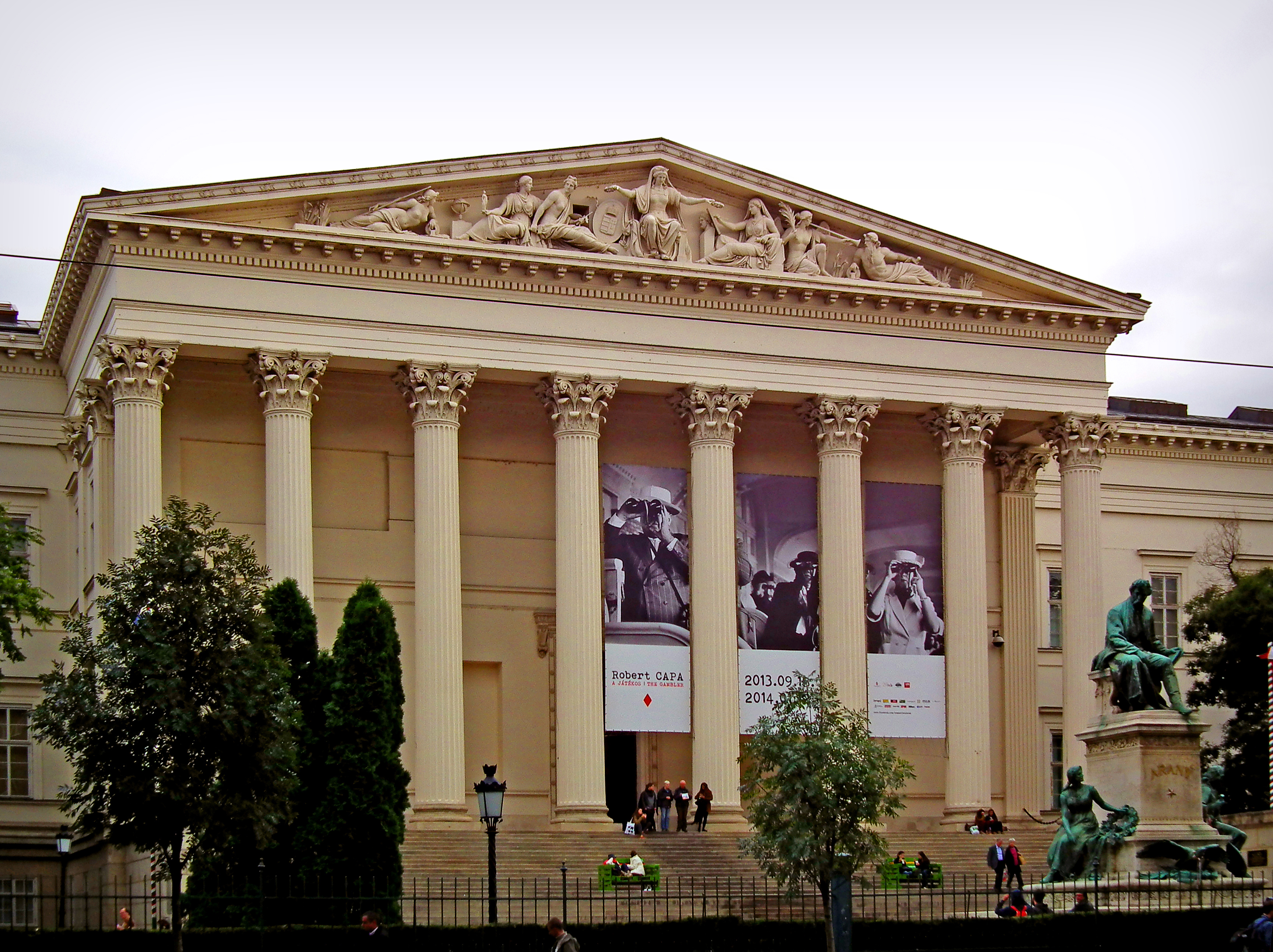
The Hungarian National Museum (1837–1847) designed by Mihály Pollack

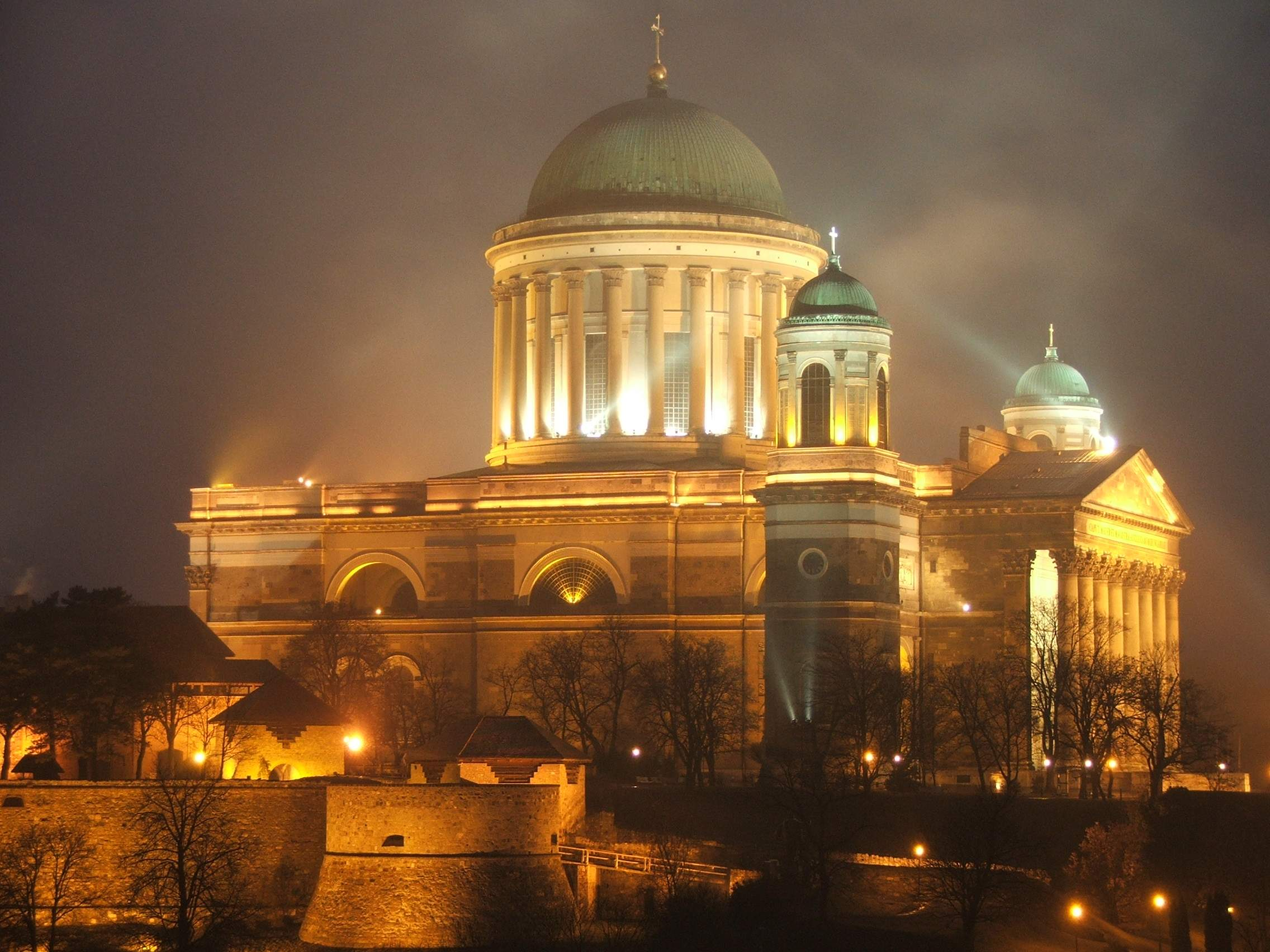
Night view of the Esztergom Basilica (1822-1869) built by four architects, including János Packh and József Hild

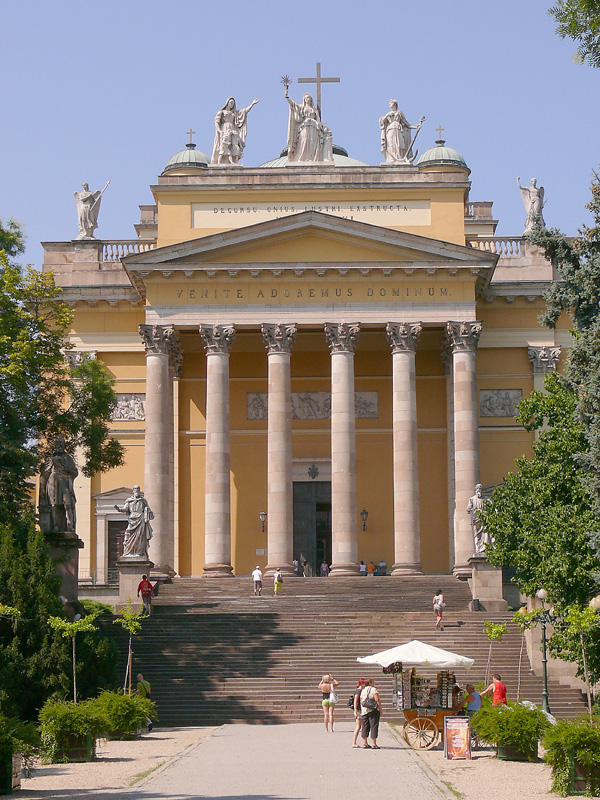
Main facade of the Neoclassical Cathedral Basilica of Eger (1831–1836)

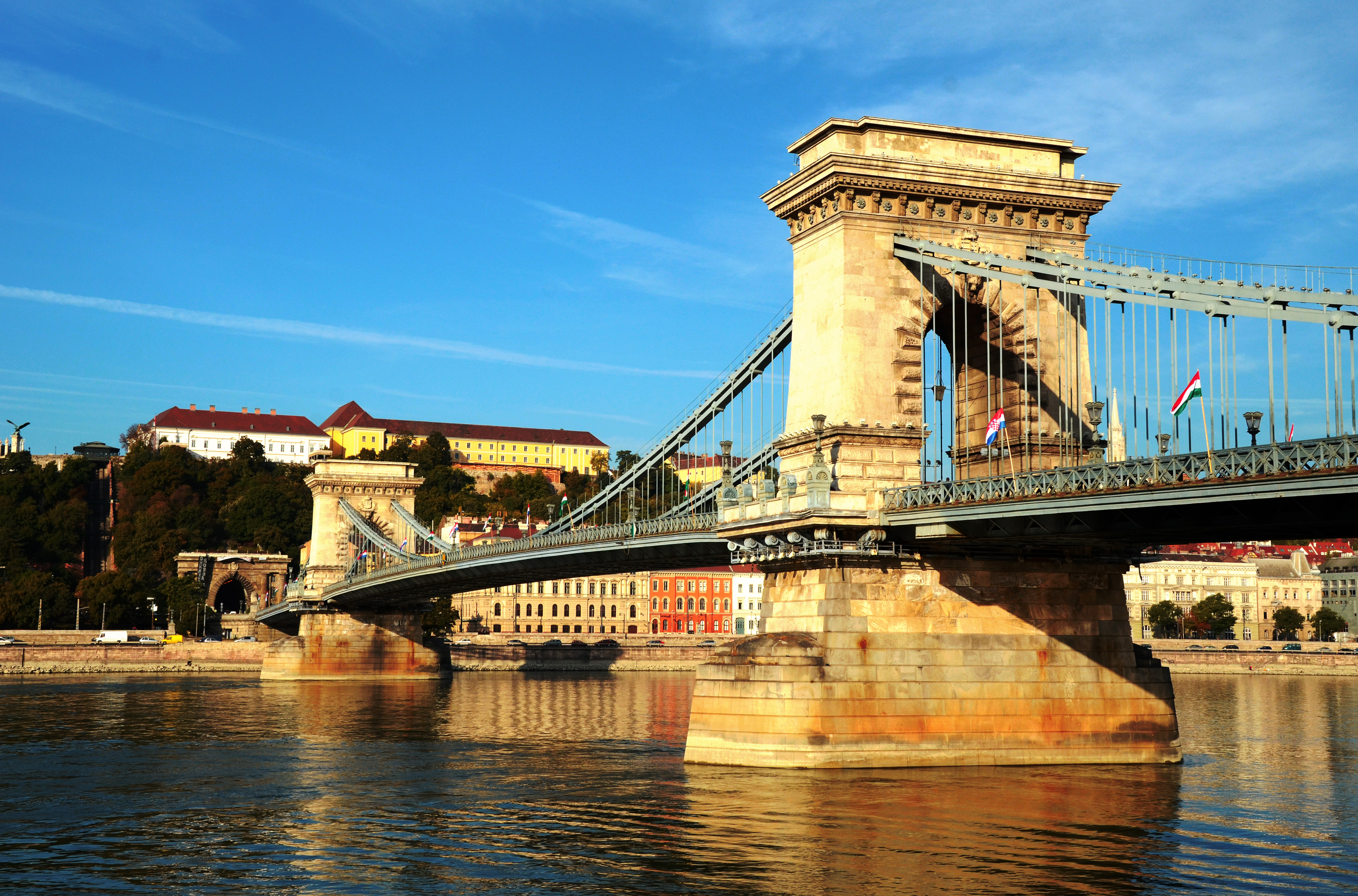
The Neoclassical Széchenyi Chain Bridge (1840-1849)

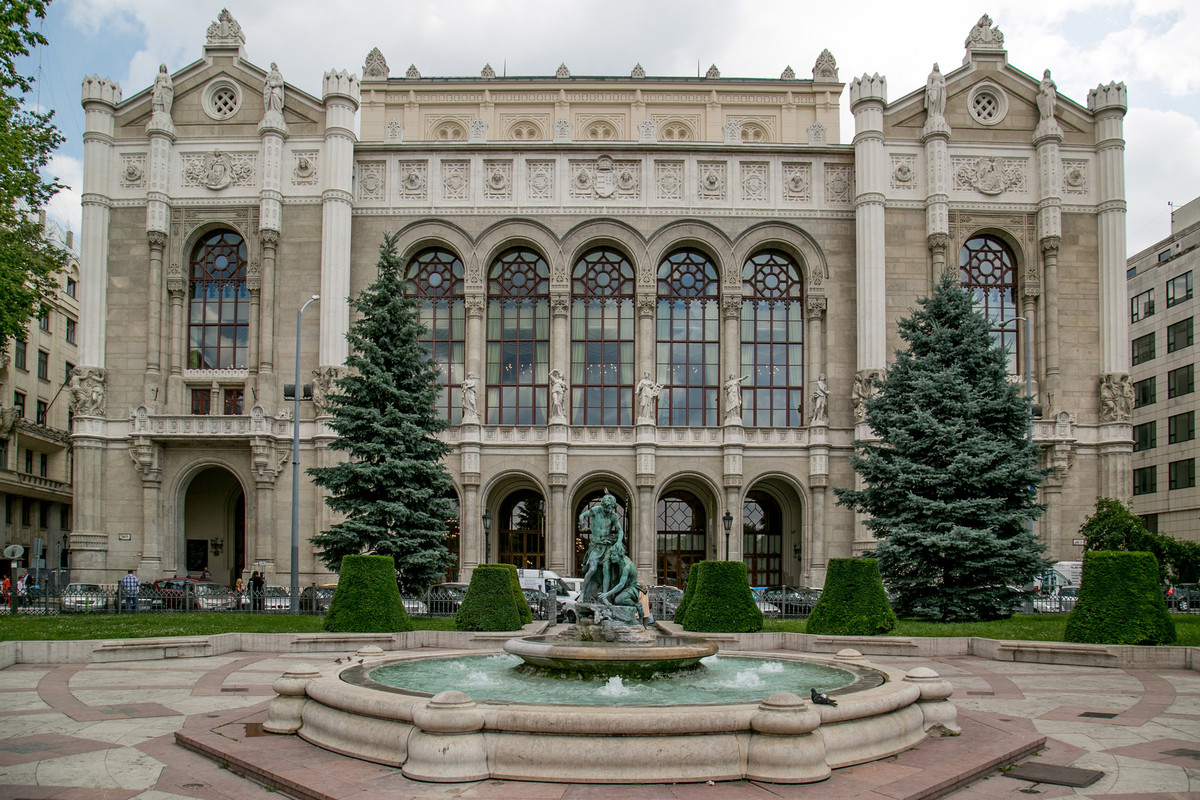
Romantic Vigadó, Pest
(1859-1865)

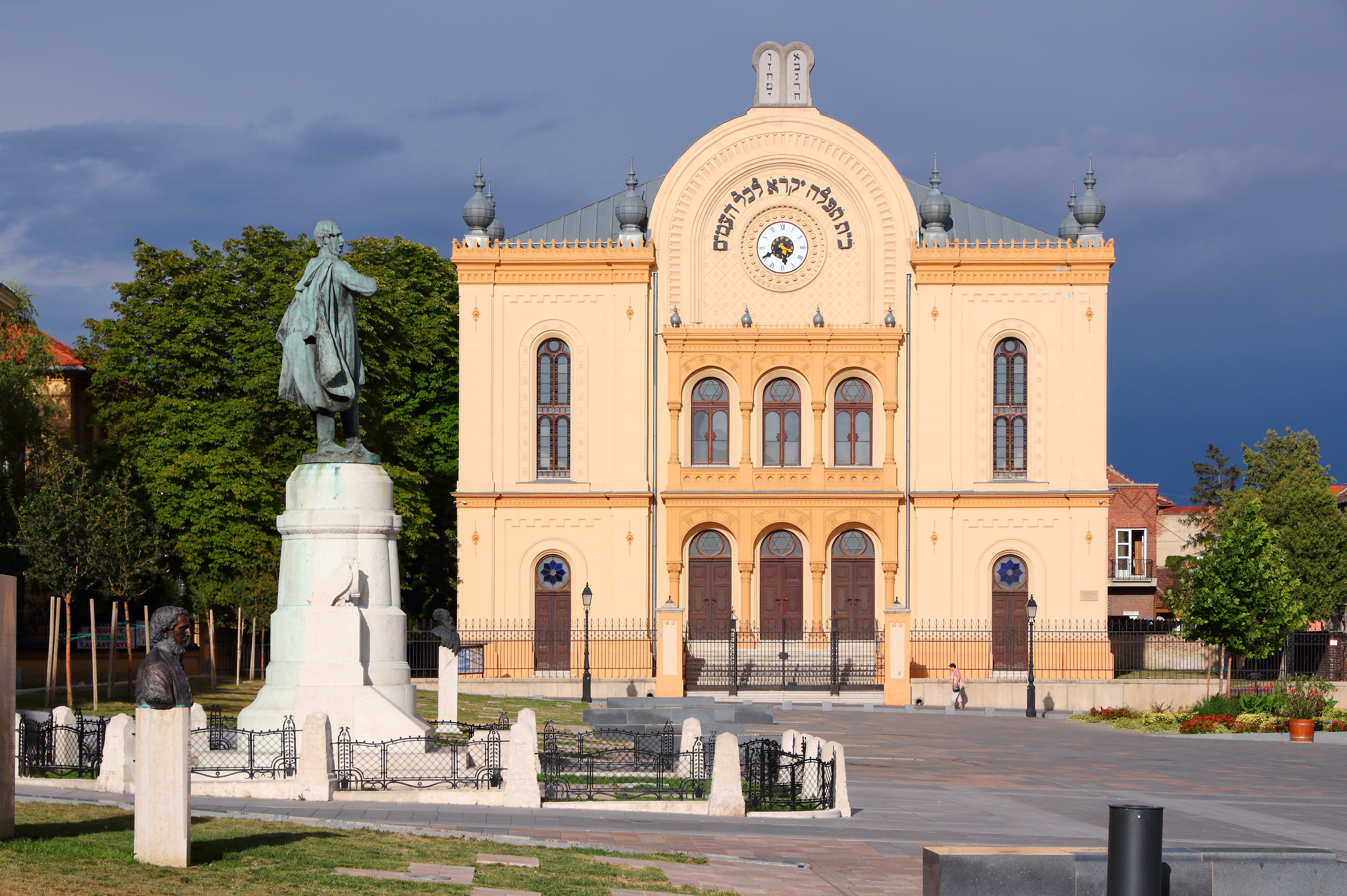
Romantic Great Synagogue of Pécs (1869)

=== The age of dualism ===
The most important architect of the second half of the 19th century was Miklós Ybl (1814-1891), started out from Romanticism. His influence, however, was rather manifested in the spread of the Historicism. After 1860, the Historicist aspirations appeared, first the Renaissance Revival (Ybl: Várkert Bazár, Hungarian State Opera House, Vámház körút; Gusztáv Petschacher and Alajos Hauszmann). Frigyes Schulek (1841-1919) and Imre Steindl (1839-1902) were involved in resurrecting the styles of Gothic and Romanesque Revivals (Fisherman's Bastion, Hungarian Parliament Building). At the 19th century, various Eclectic and neo-Baroque palaces were used to define the city views.

Ödön Lechner faced historical aspirations. He wanted to create a national architecture, so he sought to create an independent design. With emphasis on the Eastern heritage of the Hungarian people, he introduced into Hungarian architecture the donkey arch and other Eastern elements, which he added with a form tag from the Hungarian folk art, creating a specific Hungarian Art Nouveau. His work had a huge impact on the younger generation, especially with its non-Budapest buildings (City Hall of Kecskemét). His followers included Ede Toroczkai Wigand (1870-1945), Károly Kós, Géza Márkus.

The Art Nouveau of István Medgyaszay (Petőfi Theatre of Veszprém, Petőfi Theatre of Sopron, St. Elizabeth Church of Muľa (current Slovakia)), which in several aspects points towards the avant-garde (Laczkó Dezső Múzeum in Veszprém). Only the World War I ended the flowering of the Hungarian Art Nouveau, although rural Art Nouveau housing houses were built even in the 1920s. However, only the plaster architecture preserved the motifs of folk nature. Hungarian architects of this period produced many important works in today's neighbouring countries: Croatia and others.

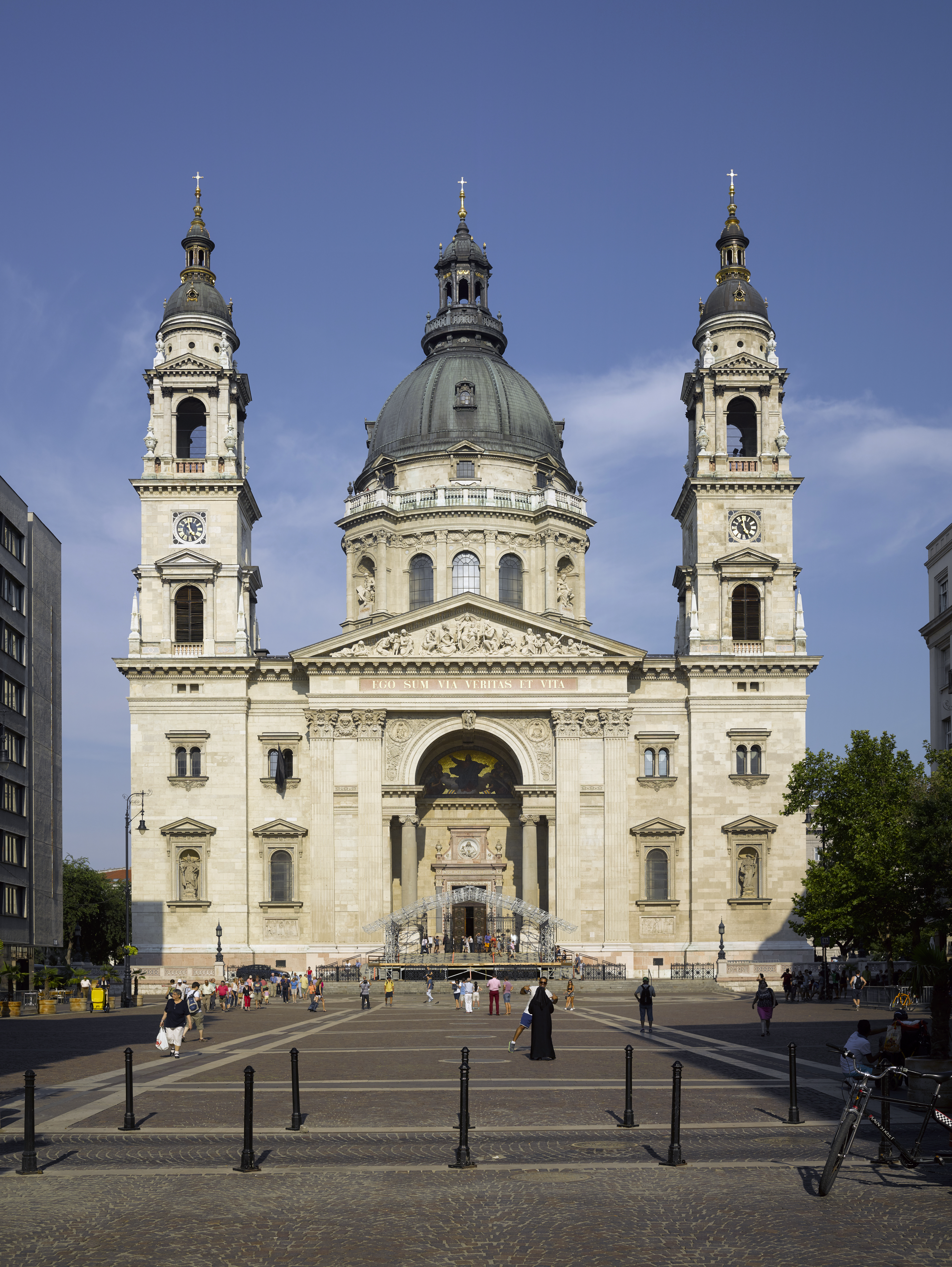
St. Stephen's Basilica in Budapest (1851-1906) by József Hild and Miklós Ybl

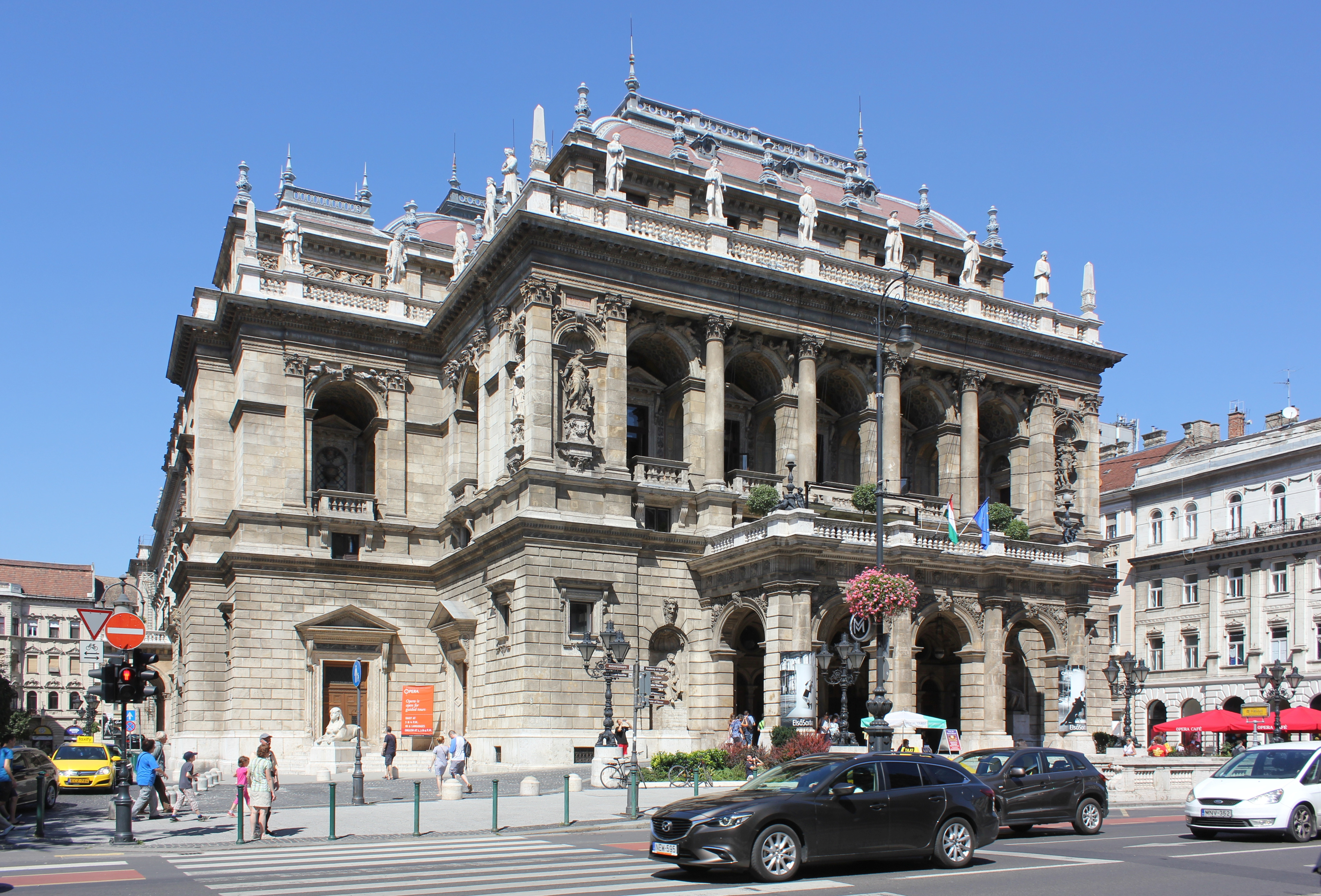
Hungarian State Opera House in Budapest (1875-1884) by Miklós Ybl

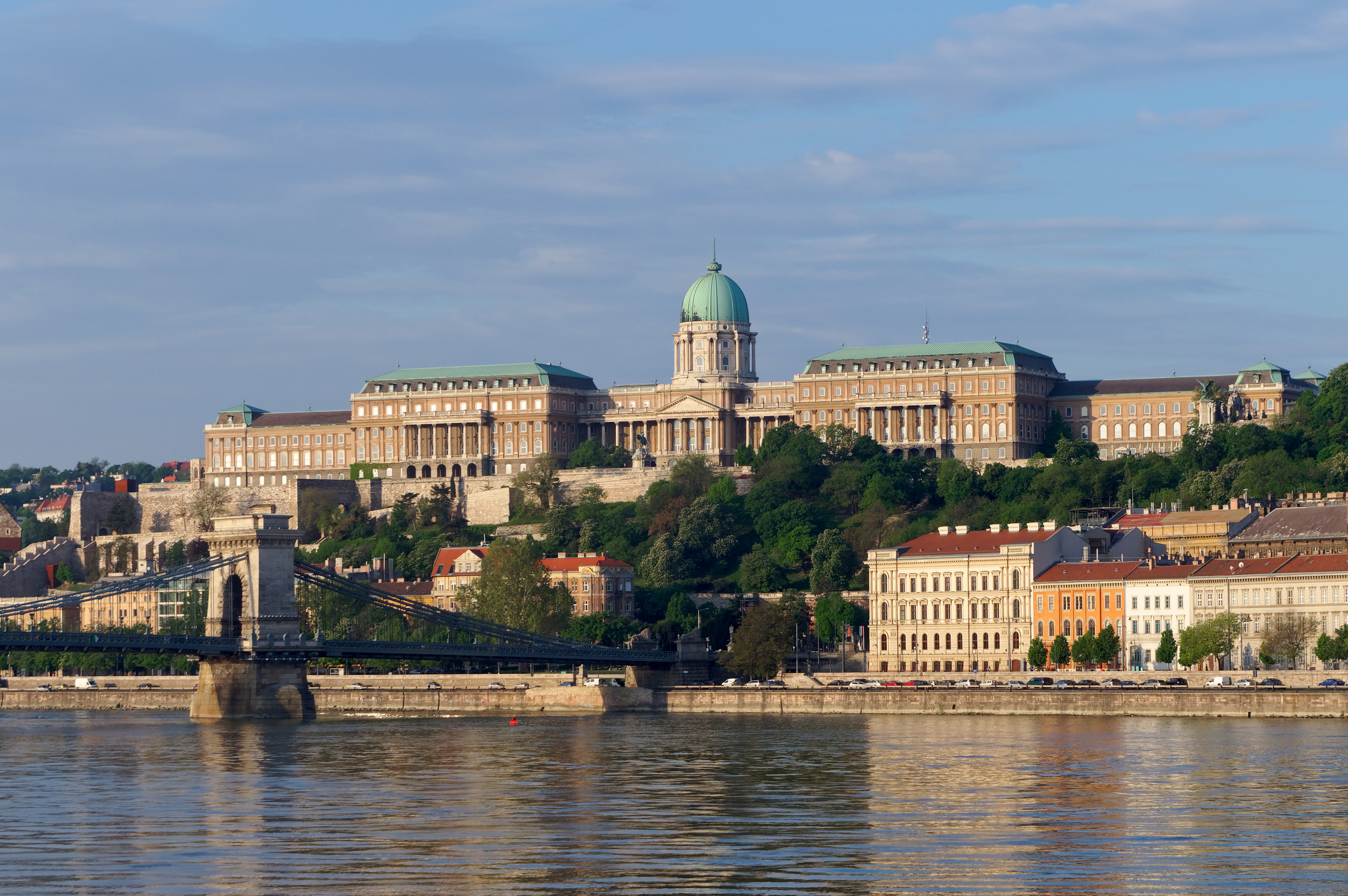
Buda Castle, rebuilt 1875-1912

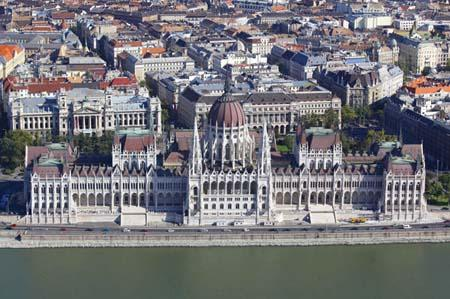
Hungarian Parliament Building (1885-1904) by Imre Steindl

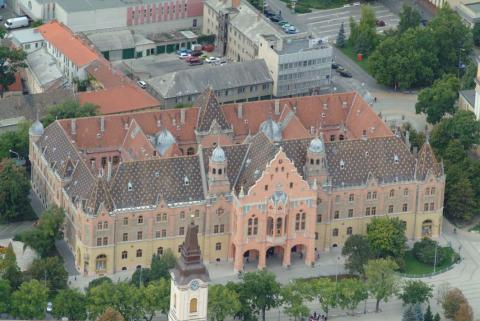
City Hall of Kecskemét (1892-1894) by Ödön Lechner

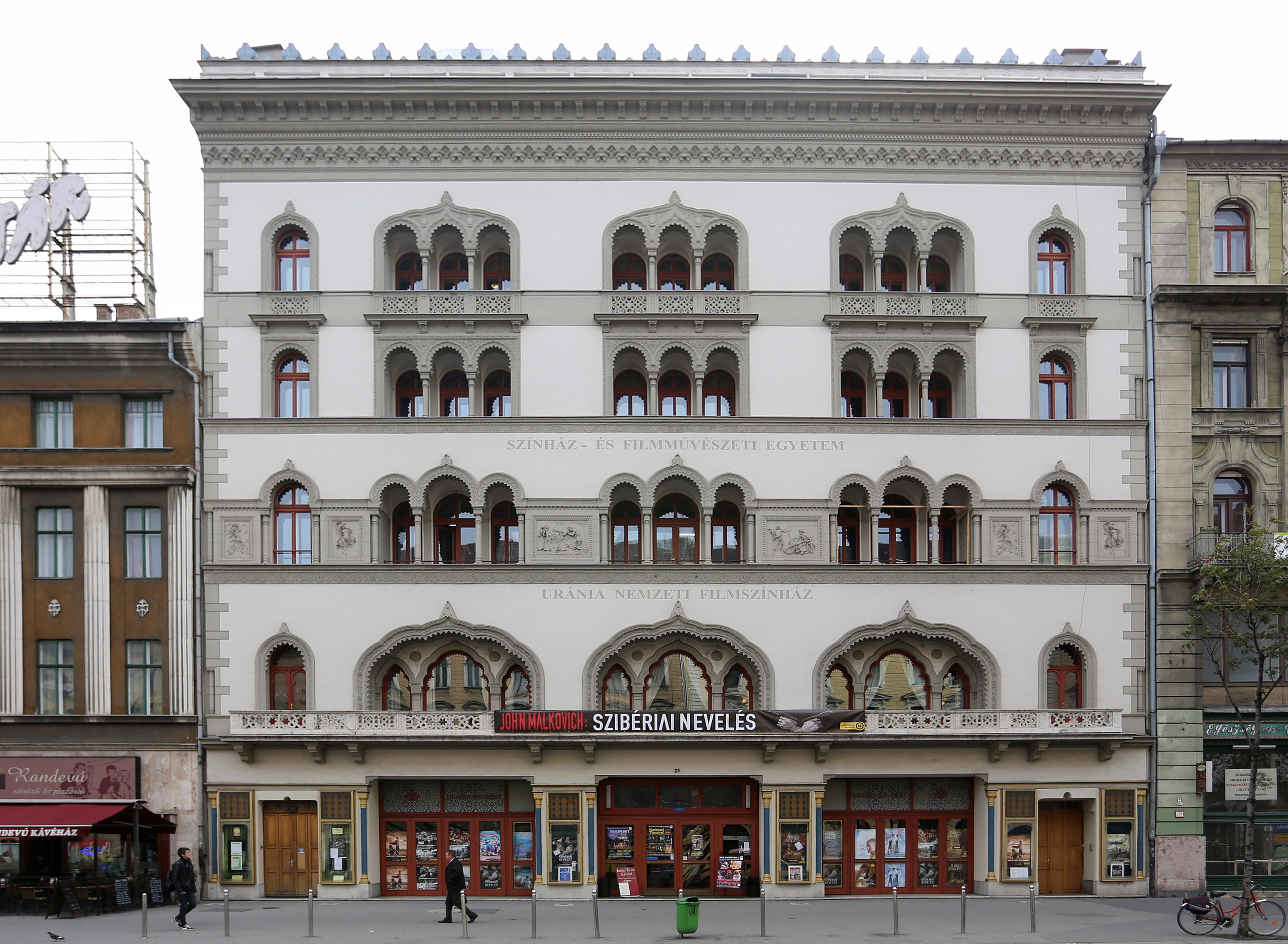
Urania National Film Theatre (1895) by Henrik Schmahl

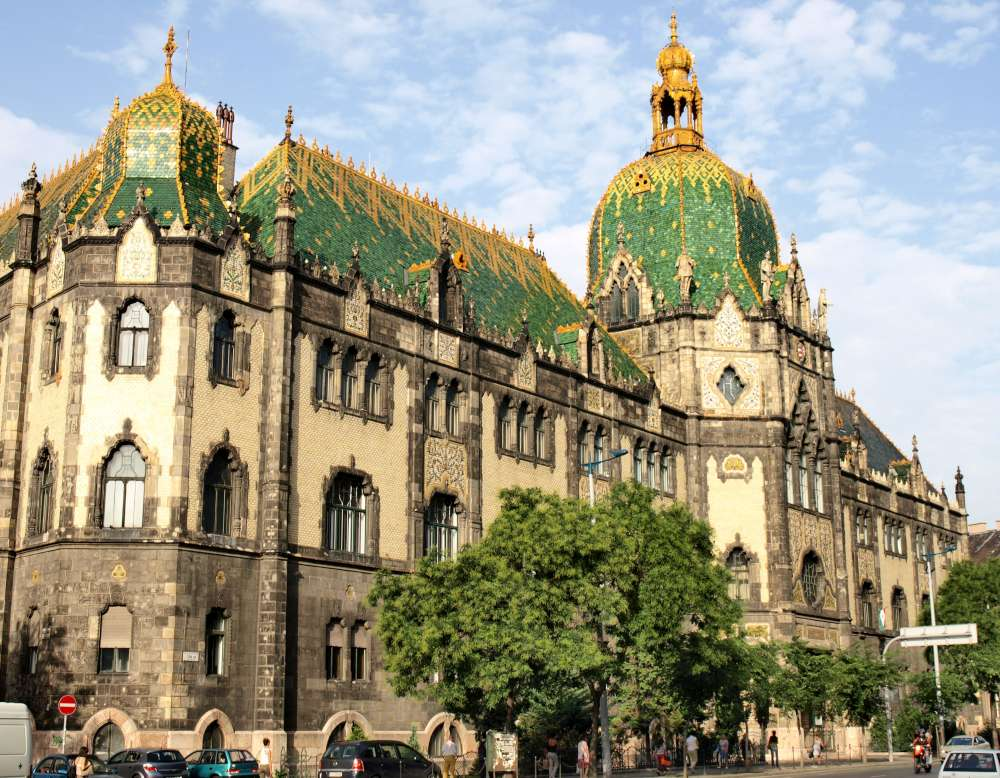
Iparművészeti Múzeum (1893-1896) by Ödön Lechner

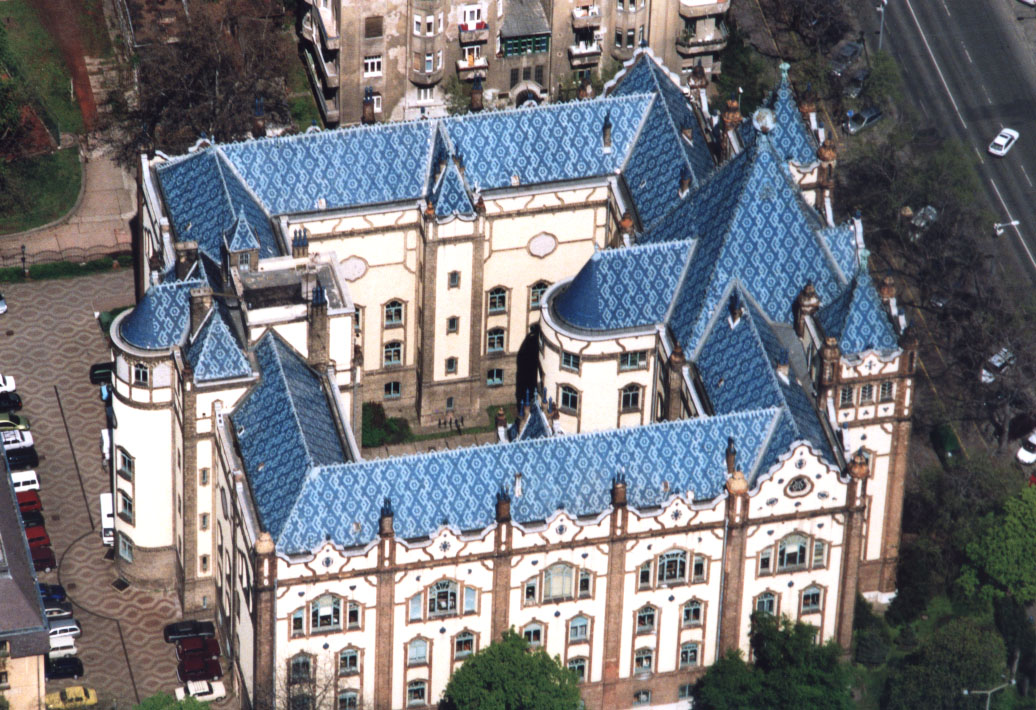
Geological Museum of Budapest (1896-1899) by Ödön Lechner

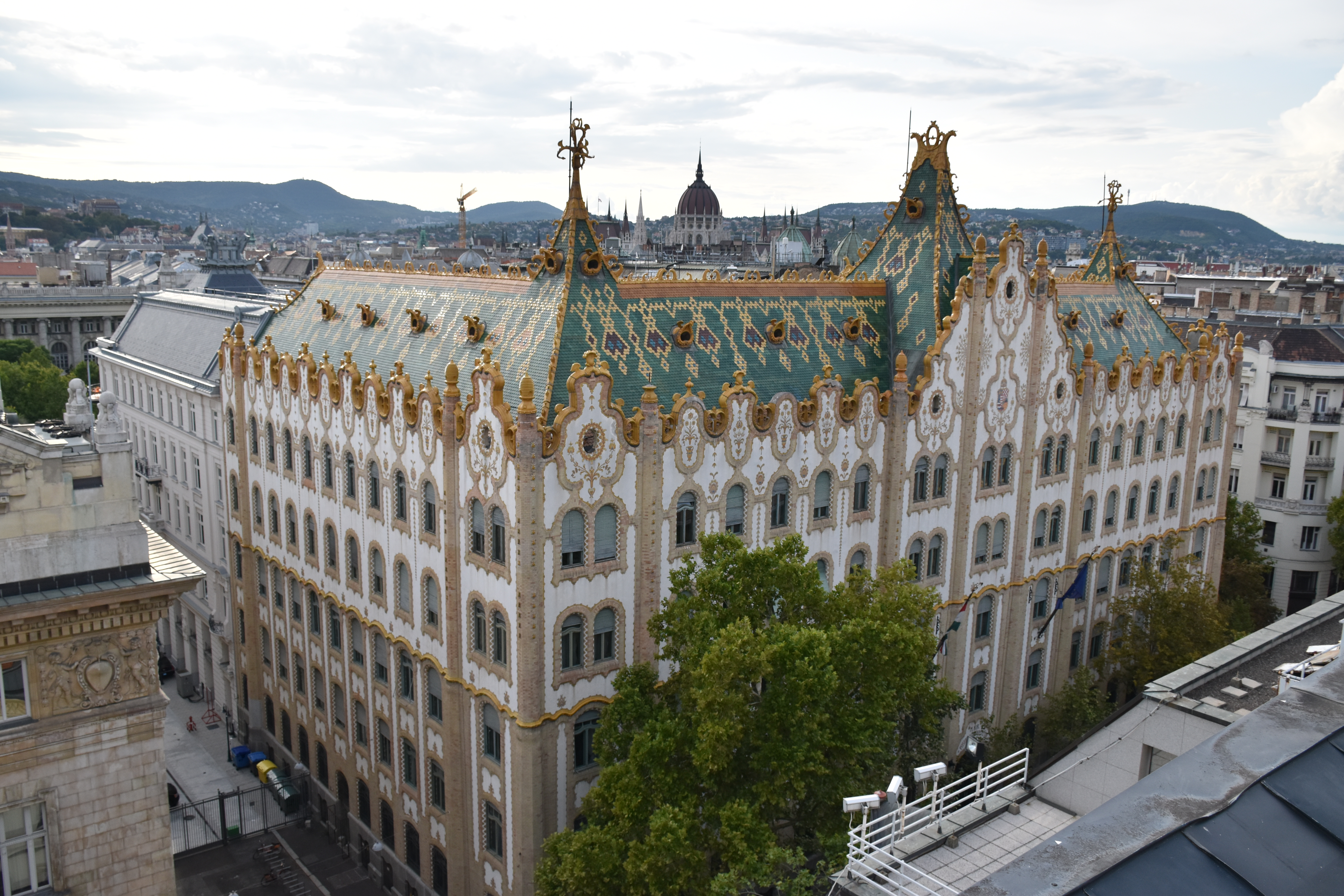
Hungarian Postal Savings Bank in Budapest (1899-1902) by Ödön Lechner

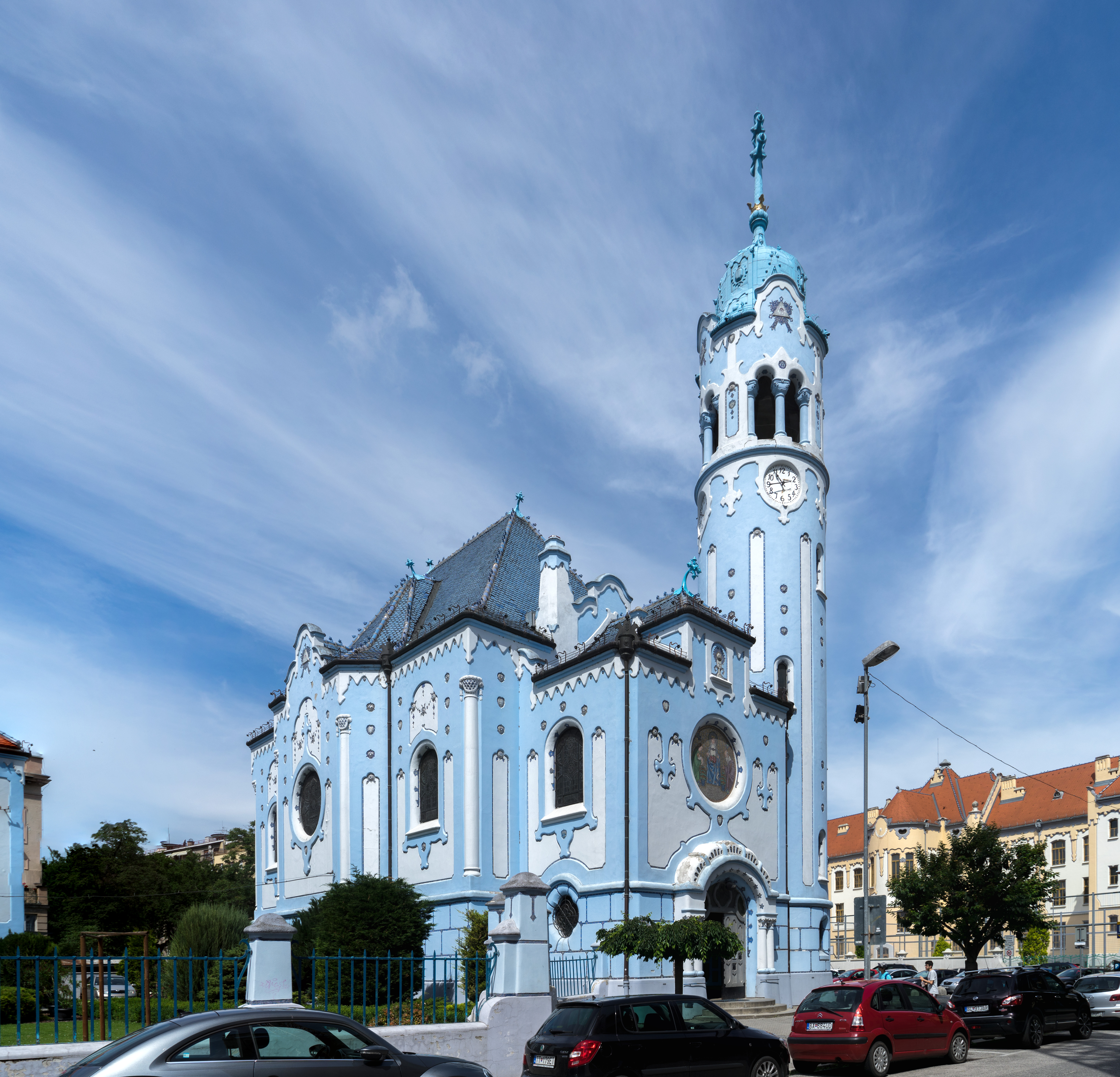
Blue Church in Bratislava, now Slovakia (1907-1913) by Ödön Lechner

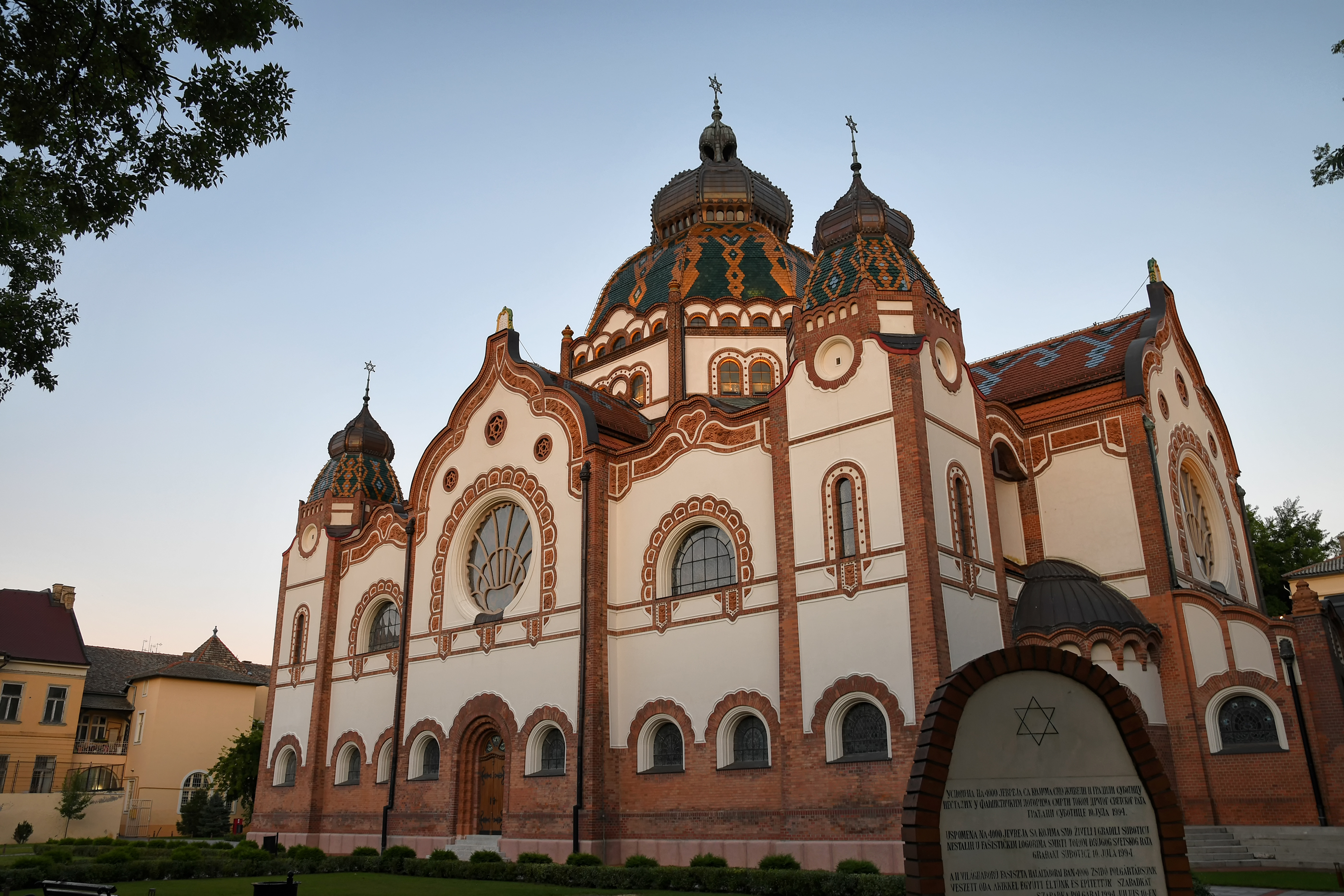
Subotica Synagogue, now Serbia (1901-1902) by Márcell Komor and Dezső Jakab

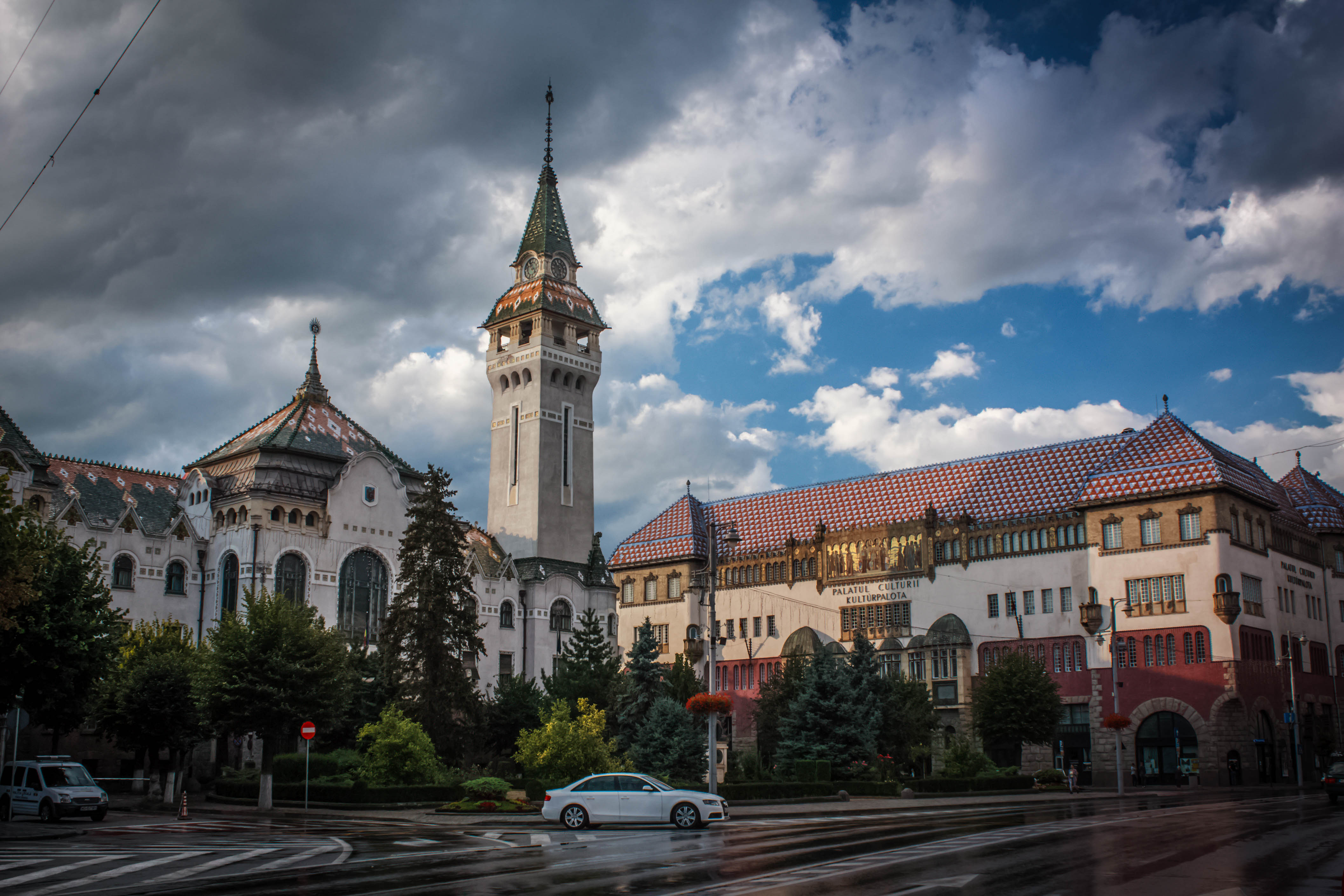
Palace of Culture in Târgu Mureș, now Romania (1911-1913) by Márcell Komor and Dezső Jakab

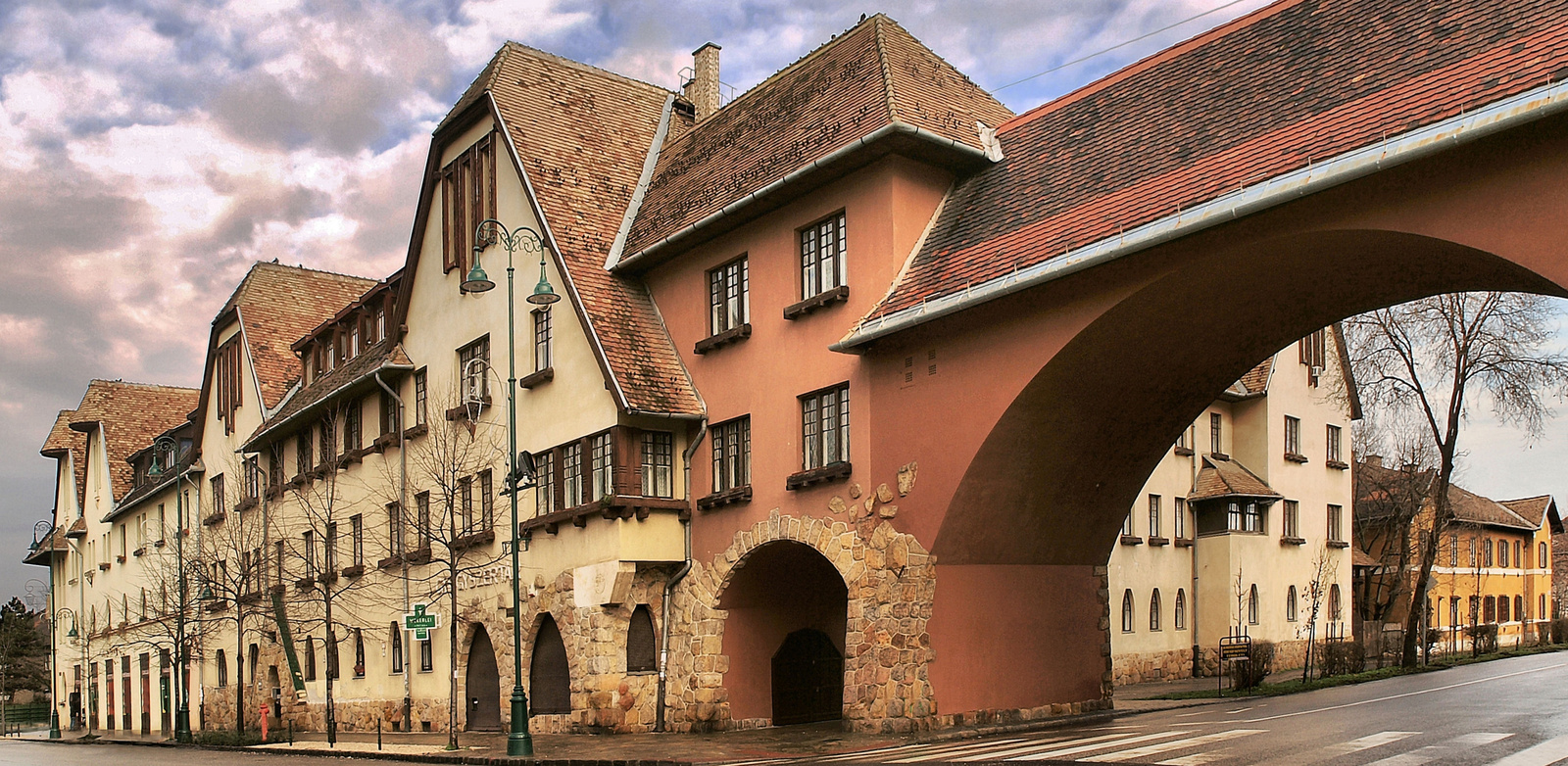
Kós Károly Square in the Wekerletelep, Budapest, by Károly Kós

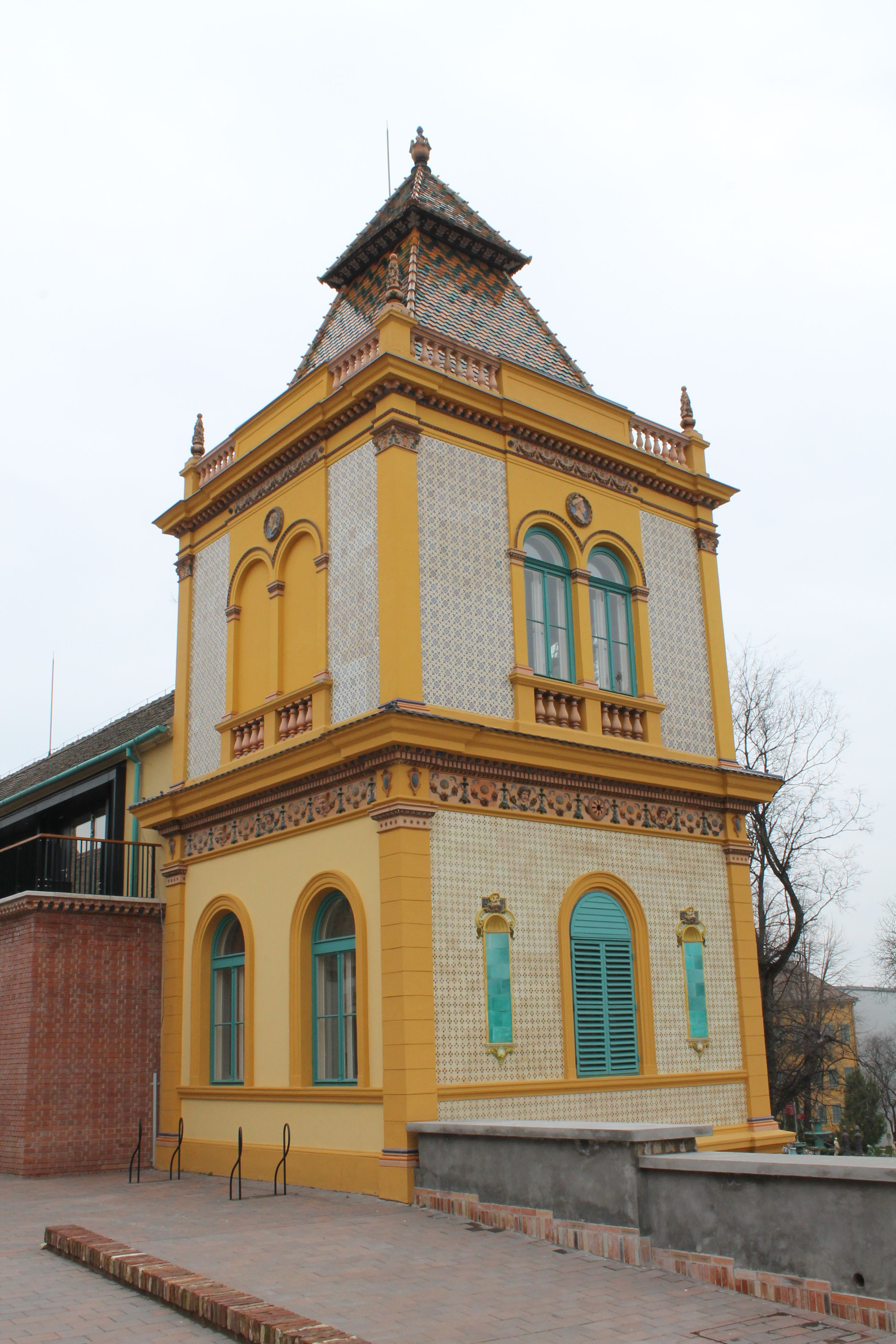
Tower in the Zsolnay Cultural Quarter in Pécs

== In the 20th century ==
The Hungarian Art Nouveau movement continued into the early 20th century. The first modern Hungarian architect Béla Lajta (1873-1920), built on Lechner's aspirations and explored new approaches.

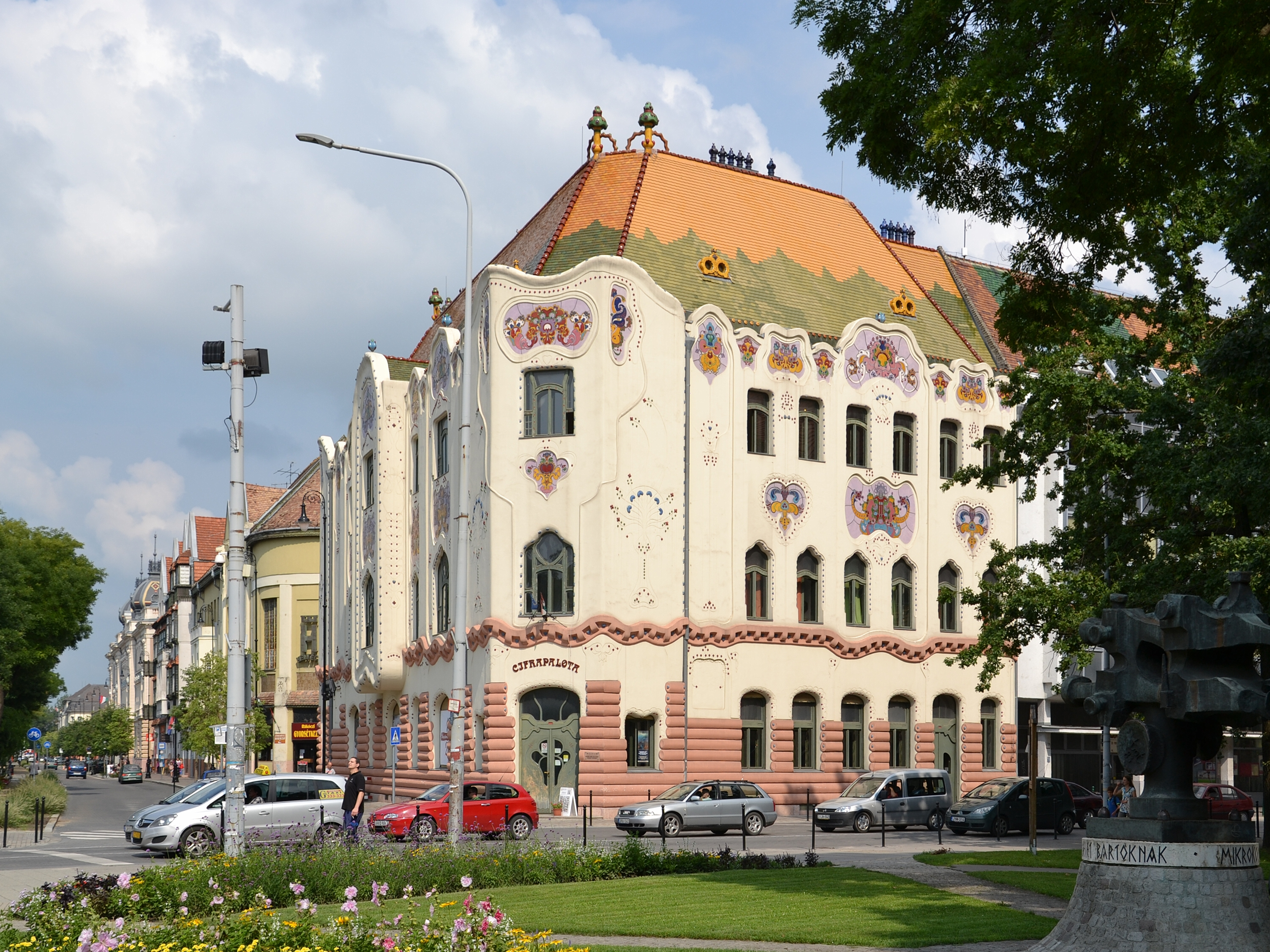
Cifra Palace in Kecskemét (1902-1903)

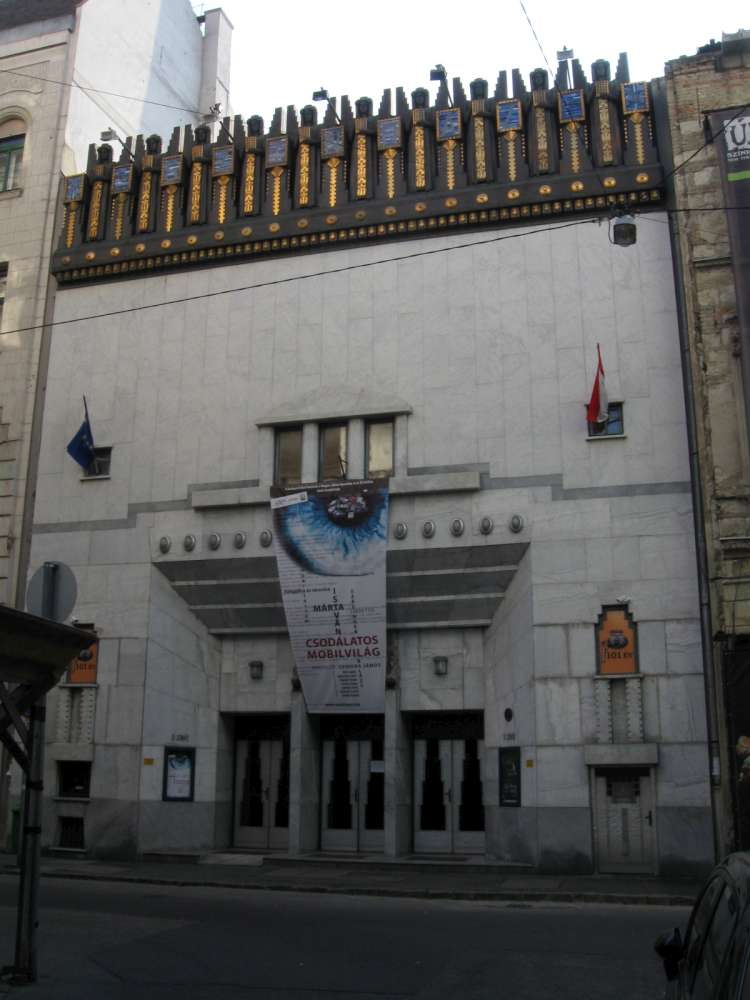
The New Theatre (Új Színház), fmr. Parisiana in Budapest (1908-1909)

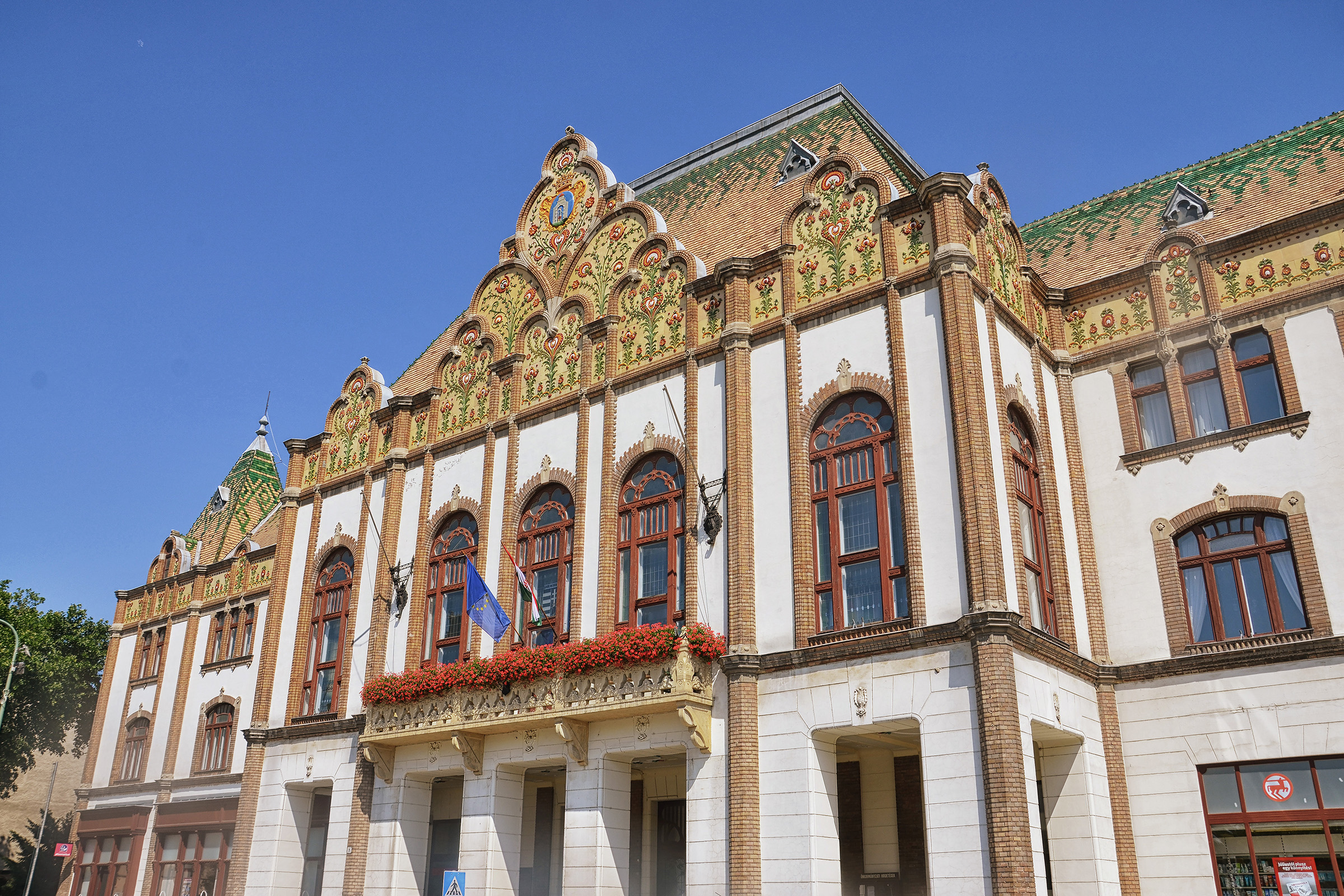
The town hall of Kiskunfélegyháza (1910-1912)

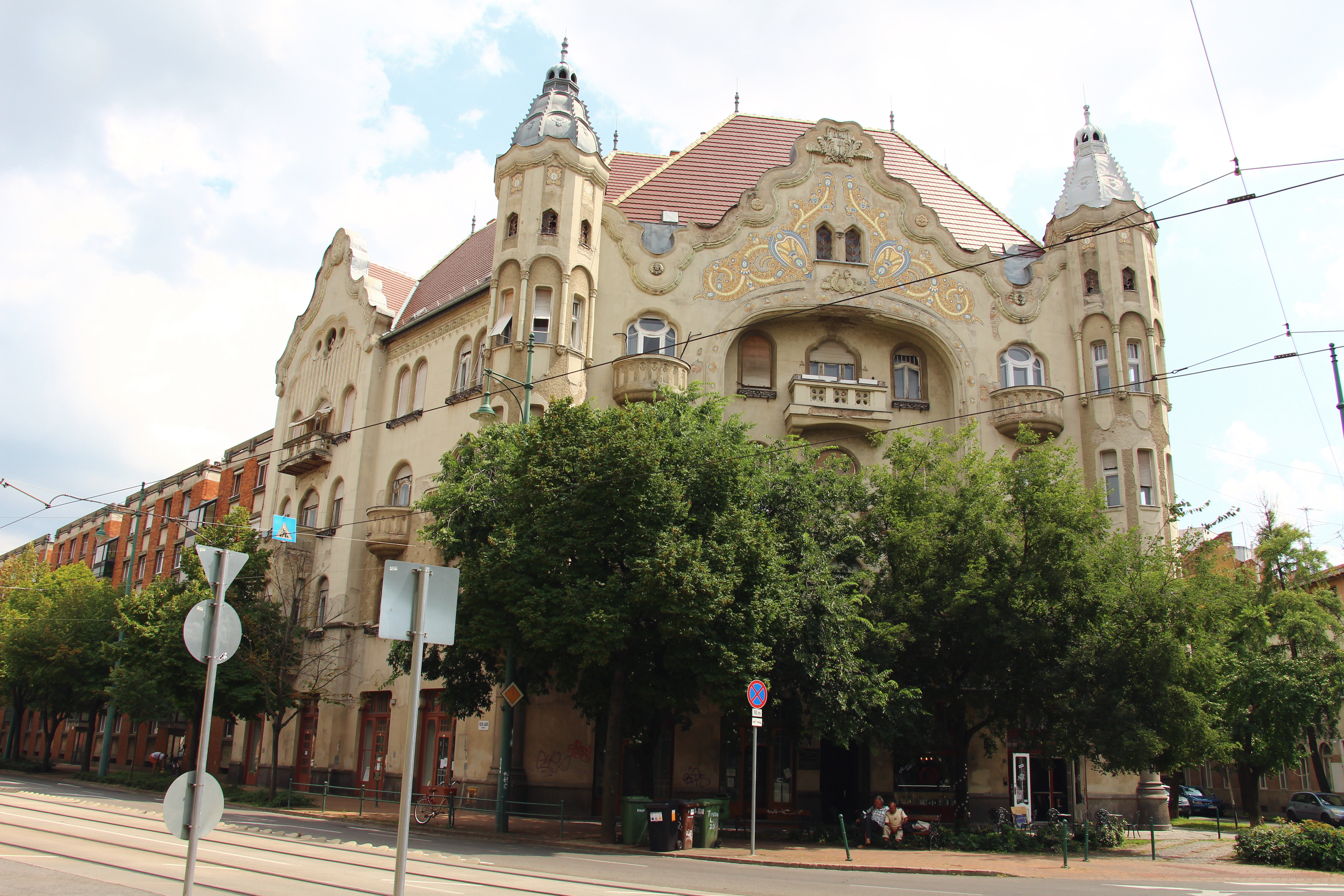
Gróf Palace in Szeged (1912-1913)

The Rózsavölgyi Commercial Building is the first modern Hungarian building. Beside it, Móric Pogány (1878-1942), Dénes Györgyi (1886-1961) was one of the innovators. This includes the fact that the World War I is a very sharp impact in the history of Hungarian architecture. Between the two World Wars, Eclectic aspirations have been revived for some time, but New Currents have been gaining ground. Church buildings were renewed by the works of Aladár Árkay and Bertalan Árkay, Gyula Rimanóczy, Károly Weichinger, Iván Kotsis, mainly with Italian inspiration.

The Congrès Internationaux d'Architecture Moderne (CIAM/CIRPAC group) in Hungary (Farkas Molnár, József Fischer, Marcel Breuer and more) set the goal for the introduction of the Bauhaus ideas in Hungary. CIAM decided to form national groups at its congress in Frankfurt in 1929. Farkas Molnár with several Hungarian architects participated in the congress. After their return, CIAM's Hungarian group was formed, led by Farkas Molnár and József Fischer. The Hungarian group of CIAM called itself the CIRCAC section after the CIAM steering committee. Its operation was manifested in the propagation of modern architecture, related social criticism and the design of buildings in line with the Bauhaus principles. The periodical "space and form" (which was grouped around by contemporary advanced architects) generally published the plans of the members of the Hungarian group of CIAM in January. Meetings at the Centrál kávéház or at the home of some managers provided a regular framework for the operation of the group.

The typical activity of the group's period up to 1932 was mainly agitative.

Their first manifestation is the Hungarian Association of Engineers and Architects of 1928. it was a debate on modern architecture in November, where József Fischer (construction sites in Frankfurt) presented a picture report, and Pál Ligeti (aesthetics of modern architecture) gave a presentation.

The group's exhibitions the first exhibition was organised in the framework of the 1931 Home Furnishings and household for Autumn Fair. This is where the plan for "the dorm" was presented. The idea of the "Kolház" leaves the traditional thinking of architecture, and it also contains the content of lifestyle and sociological change, today we would call it a utopian plan (the idea of it even came up in the 1960s, and even a lively "collective house-private residence" discussion forum was organised by the new writing journal.

In the spring of 1932, the group organized its own (second) exhibition at the Tamás gallery. At this exhibition, their theoretical and propaganda activities have been presented to the public in an orderly manner. (..."in the new interest, the old methods of architecture had to be fought ..." (FJ). The material of the exhibition is pictures, drawings and statistical data processed on cardboard, which show the poor housing and social conditions in Hungary.

The third exhibition of the group was organized in 1932 in the framework of The Craft Industry Exhibition. The social-political trend in his spirit is strong, so some of their exhibition material was confiscated by the police before the opening. The exhibition entitled "House, City, Society" and calls for the creation of social architecture. This was the last exhibition of the group, and it was also the end of the first phase of its activity.

During the second phase of the group's activities, it carried out joint planning tasks. This section is characterised by the fact that they have not received community mandates because of their strong social policy orientation. Their activities were mainly localized to the designs of condominiums and private homes of financially wealthy civilian clients, representing a more modern spirit. In fact, they've moved away from their own ideological line. In addition to the given social and political framework in Hungary, this is also part of the fact that the group's unity was gradually broken down, the joint work was cancelled and even the Hungarian material could not be compiled for CIAM's 1938 Congress. The Hungarian group was thus dissolved in 1938. However, its architectural effect became fruitful only after the World War II.

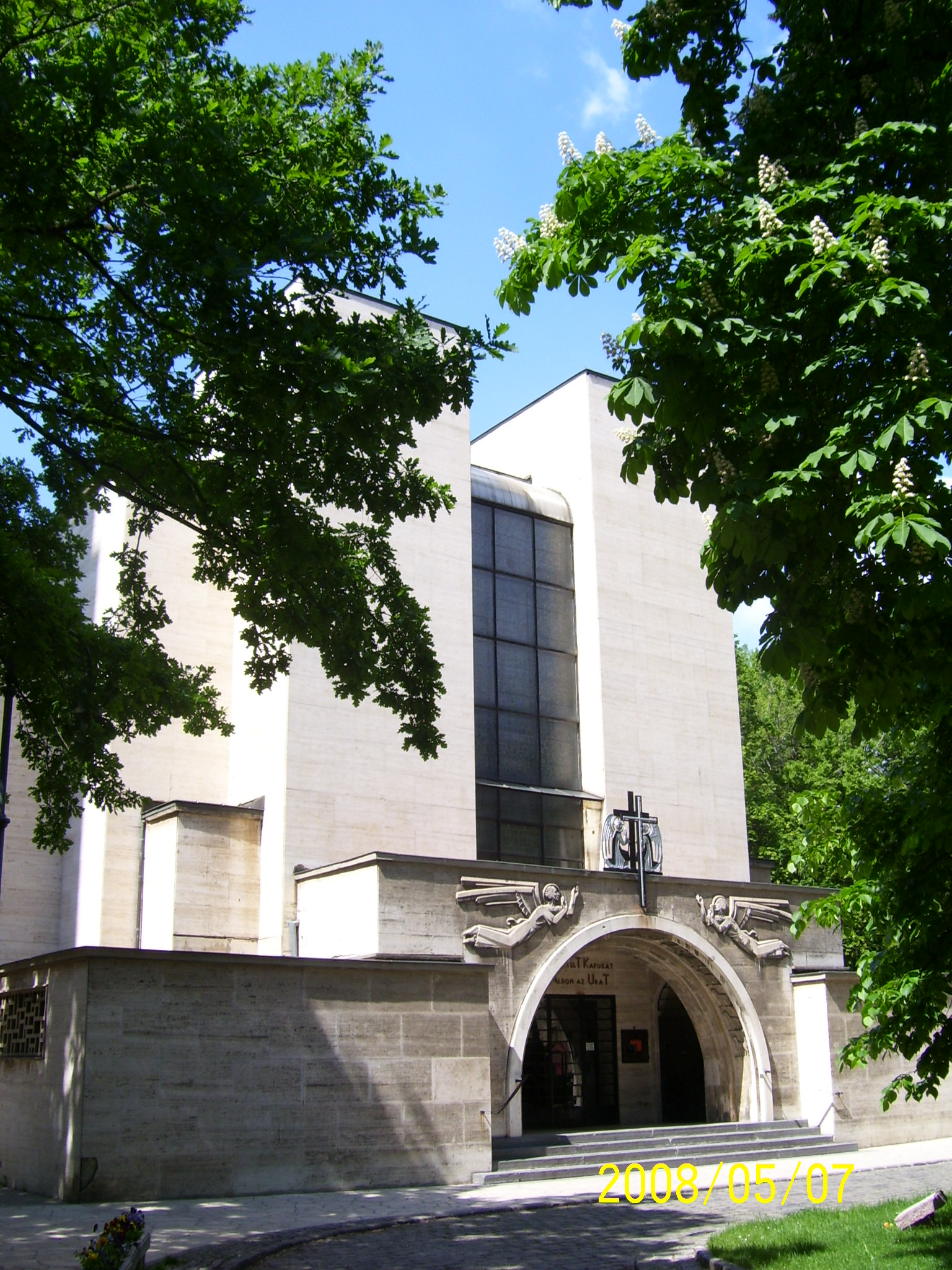
Church of Jesus of the city by Aladár Árkay and Bertalan Árkay, 1932–33

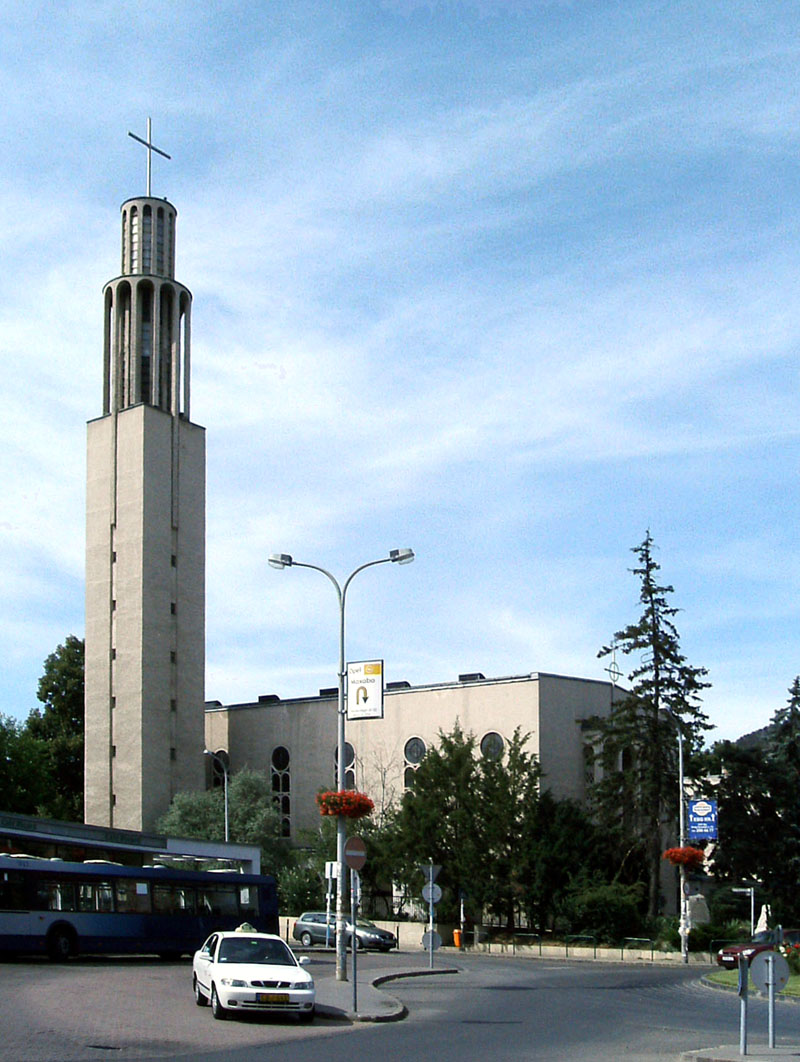
Pasaréti téri templom by Gyula Rimanóczy, 1933–34

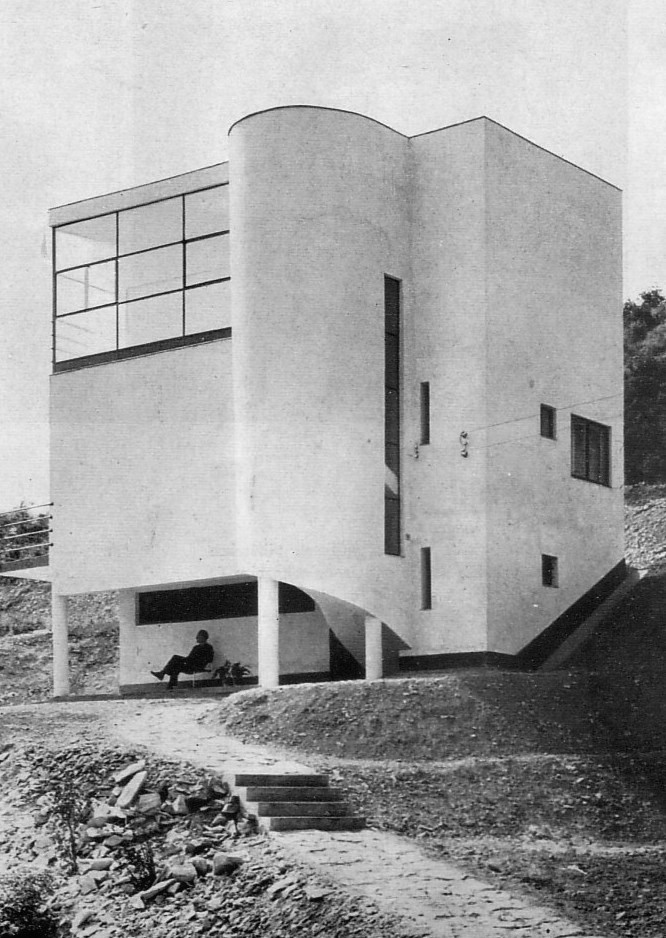
88/a, Szépvölgyi street, II, Budapest. by József Fischer 1933-34

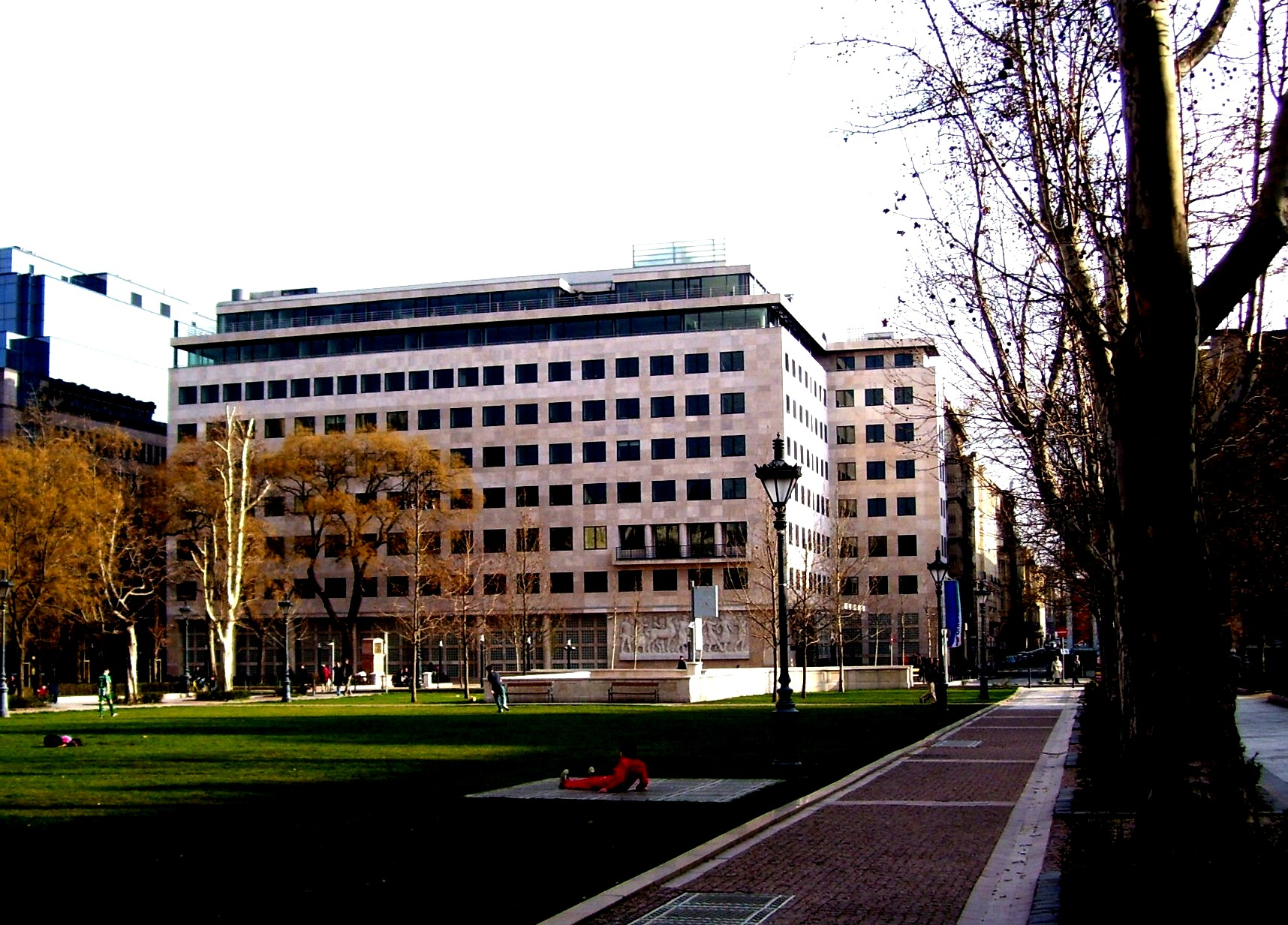
Pénzintézeti Központ, Szabadság Square, 1940, by Lauber-Nyiri

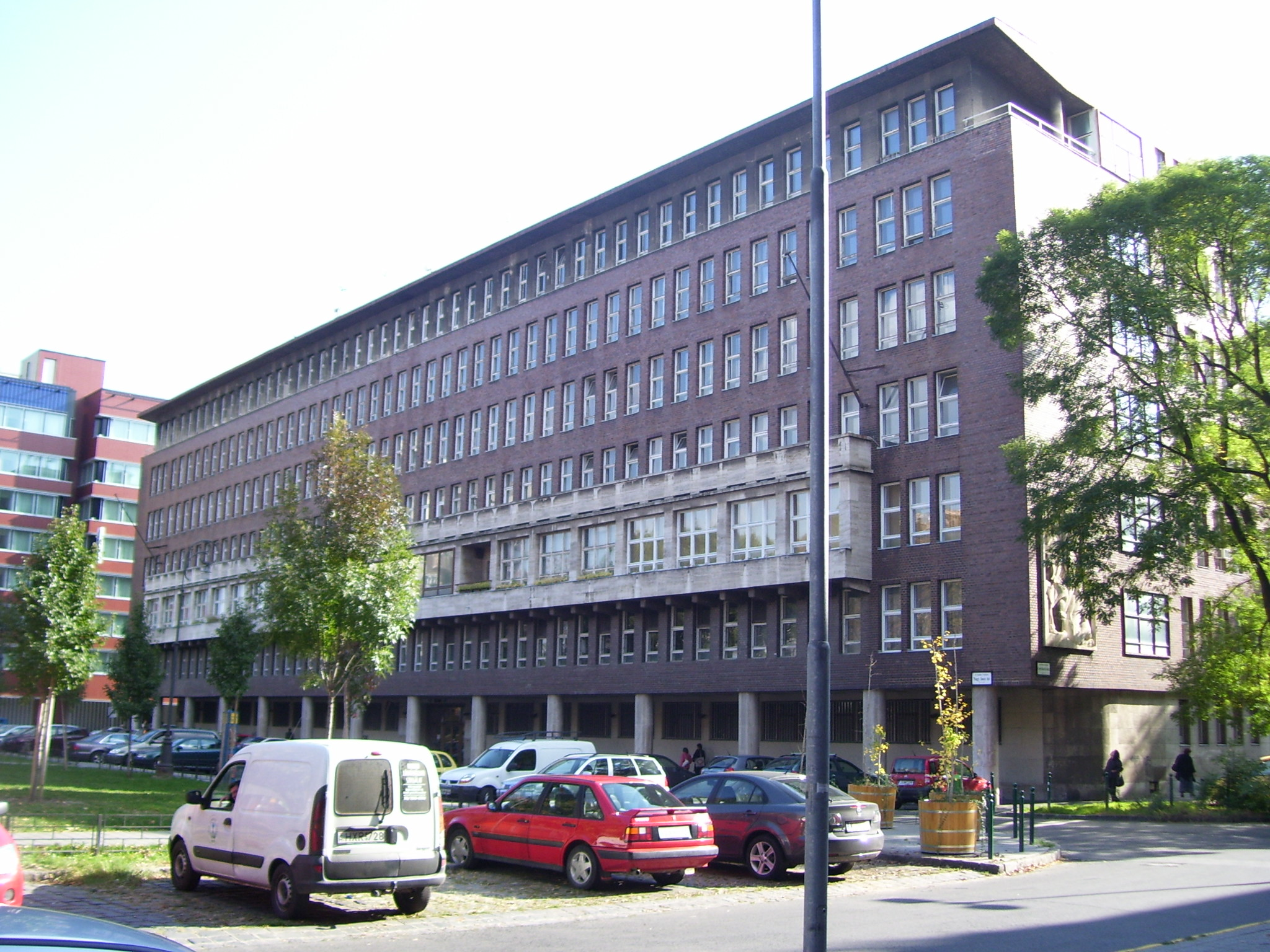
Agency for Materials and Prices, Nagy I. Square, II., Budapest, by Janáky-Szendrői, 1942

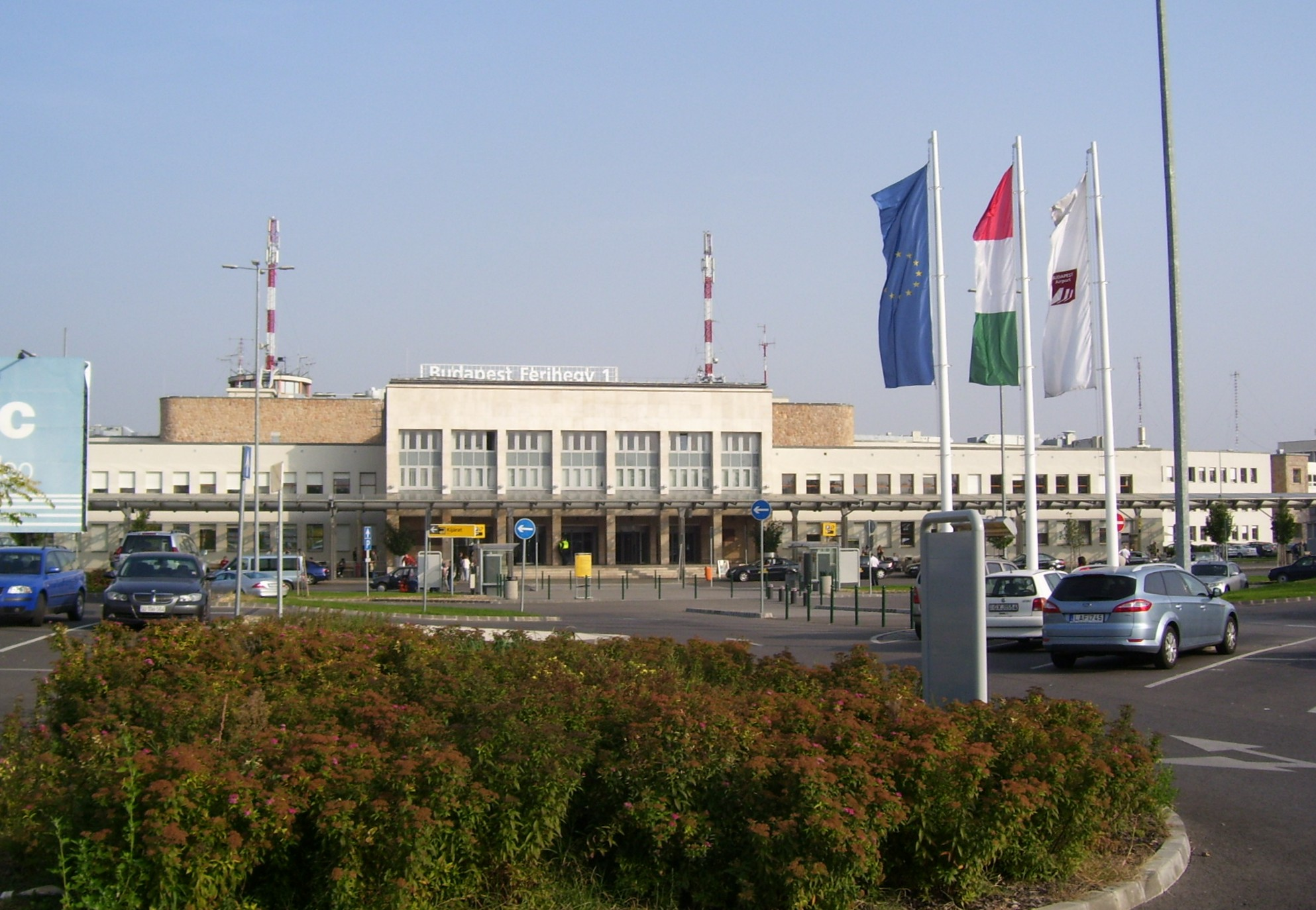
Galleries entrance building of Budapest Ferenc Liszt International Airport, Ferihegy 1, Budapest, by Károly Dávid, 1939–48

The most important architectural task of the years after the World War II was the country's restoration. At first, the modern experiments continued, but during the dictatorship, social architecture already flourishing in the Soviet Union became the model to be followed, and this architecture manifested itself in an outdated Eclectic Classicism (construction in Dunaújváros, led by Tibor Weiner, party houses, blocks, housing estates). This era has its architectural values. These include: Zoltán Farkasdy's College of Applied Arts, György Jánossy's Water tower of Szent István University in Gödöllő, and Gyula Rimanóczy's "R" building of the BME of Budapest University of Technology and Economics.

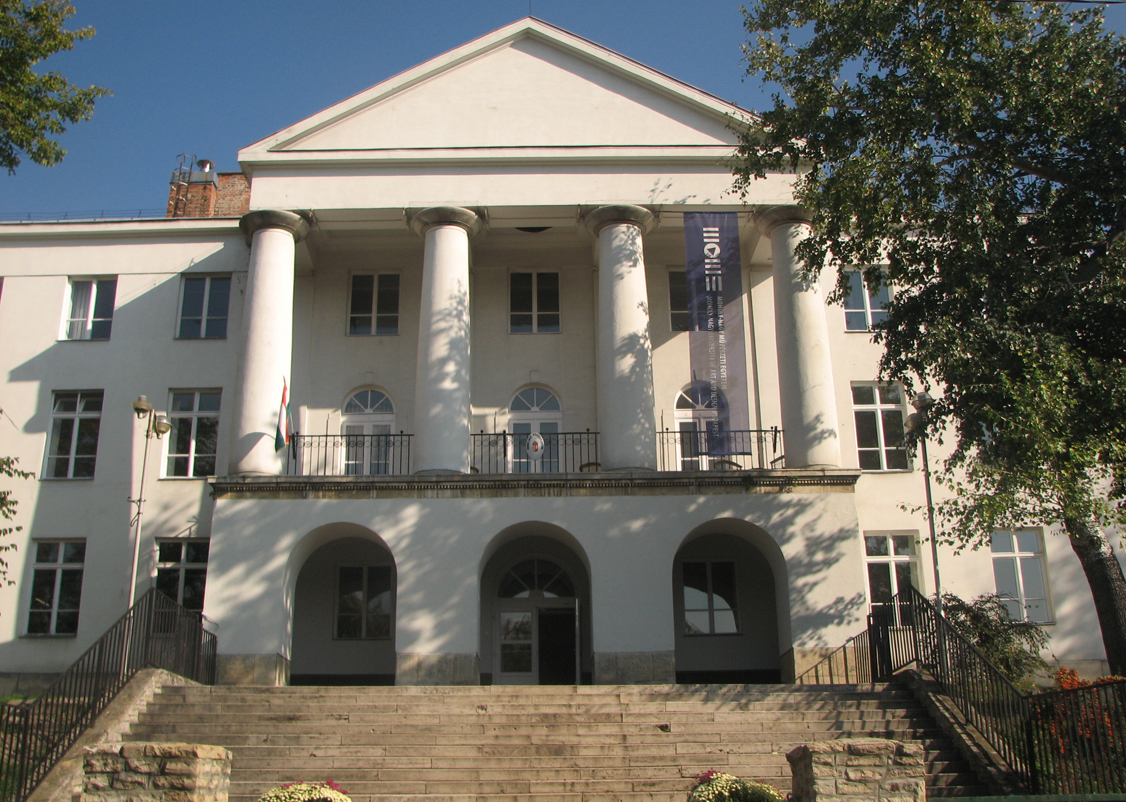
College of Applied Arts by Zoltán Farkasdy

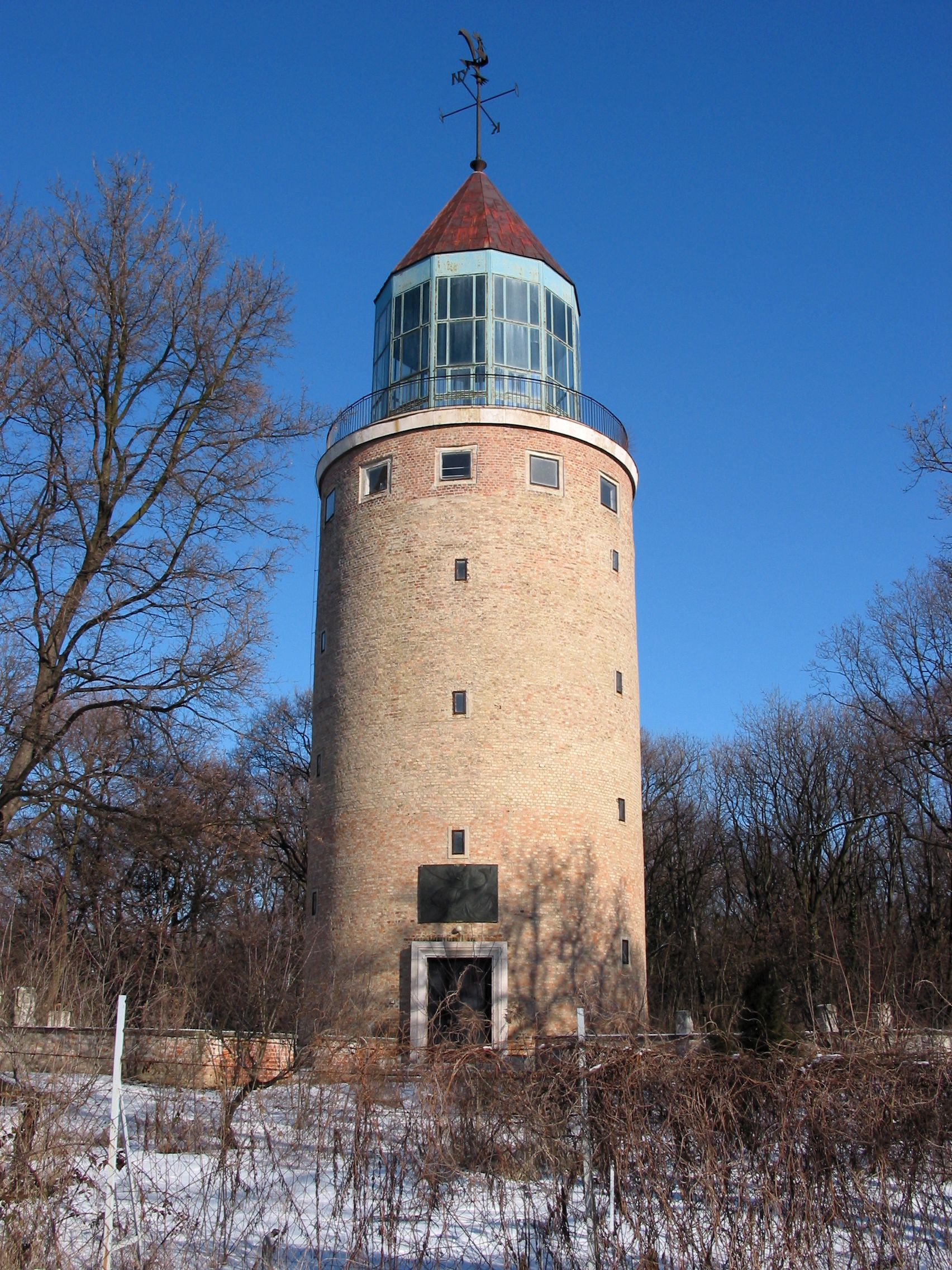
Water tower of Szent István University in Gödöllő, by György Jánossy

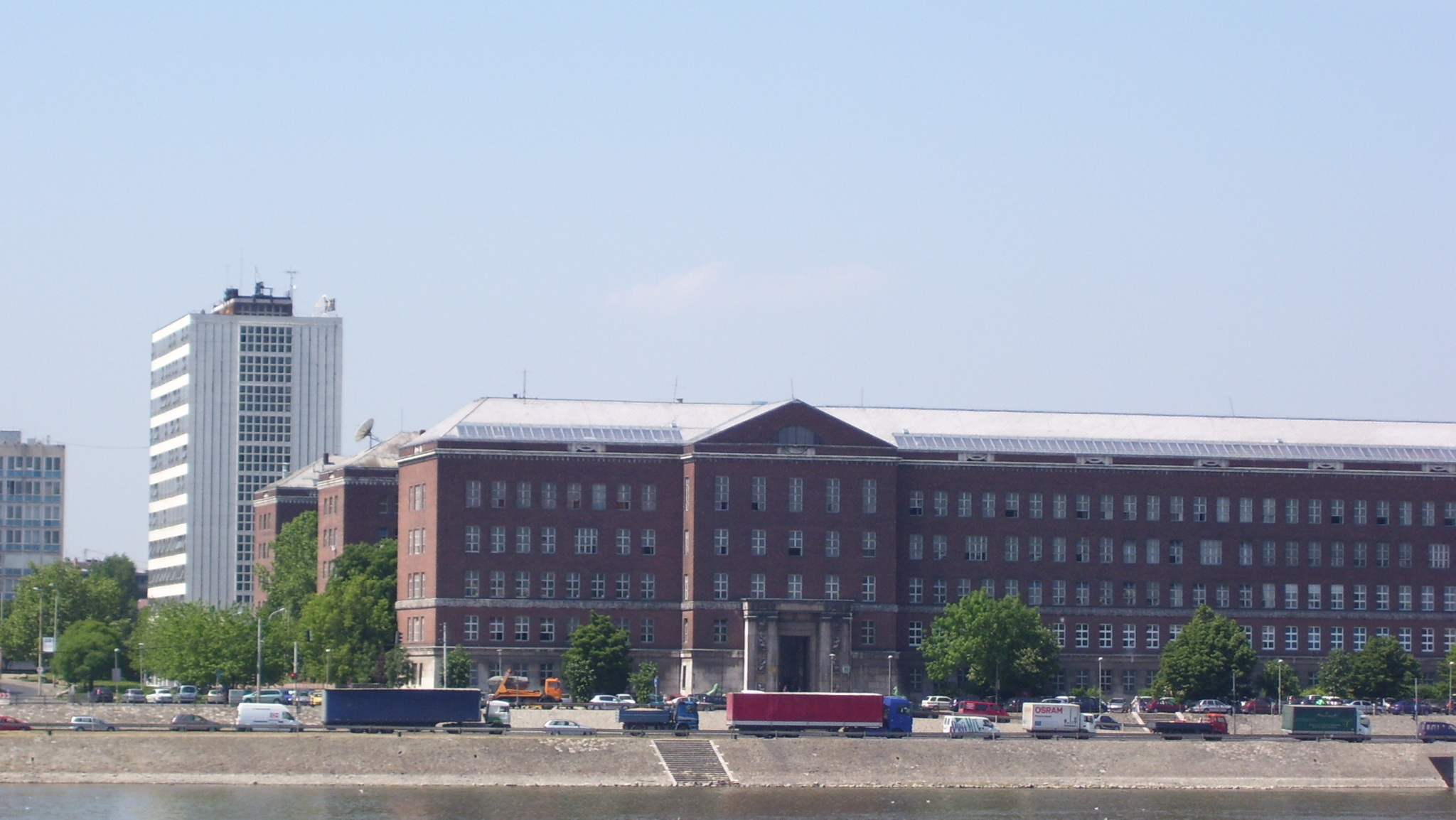
"R" building of the BME of Budapest University of Technology and Economics by Gyula Rimanóczy

The generation of Hungarian architects who came of age after the Hungarian Revolution of 1956 included university students, young instructors, and practicing architects who experienced the period's changing social, economic, technological, artistic, and architectural conditions. They have been described as representative of a generation of Hungarian architects whose work connected developments associated with earlier generations with those of architects who followed.

The period stretches from 1956 to the end of the 20th century, which is a time for marked changes, so to speak, drastic changes. In social policy, dictatorial arbitrariness, inspiring, but lost revolution, retaliation, and the escalating crisis phenomena of the one-party, top-controlled socio-economic formation, political system change, a faltering democracy, leading to today's globalisation problems.

In the meantime, the age of technical and technological changes defining the architecture of the era was also the age. The large-scale industrialisation of the nationalised construction industry, the conversion from brick construction to concrete construction, prefabrication, metal and light construction, the change in structure-type, with an astonishing expansion of the range of building materials to be used, from the brick barrel to the house and tower crane technology.

The process of changing the architectural and architectural ideal is no smaller: the architectural spirit started from the Eastern perspective to the traces and experiences of the early Hungarian avant-garde, while instructors and disciples, together with young practitioners, learned the Bauhaus principles, sucked into the idea of functionality, structure, modern material and form formation, the spirit of collectivism. Finding again the spiritual values and protection of the earlier ages. The interpretation of architecture has widened to environmental culture, environmental protection, urban science, construction and urban economy, construction, construction policy, spatial information.

But the equipment and tools of the architect have also changed, from the logarithe and tusk driver, to the always-flapping graphos, the dredging pens to computer software, façades and models, to the visual image of the World Wide Web video.

As a result of the above, there was an open interest in modern forms in the 1960s, the representative buildings of the era industrial buildings, hospitals, hotels and office buildings (Zoltán Farkasdy, József Finta, Zoltán Gulyás, György Jánossy, Károly Jurcsik, Péter Molnár, etc.).

The design and construction of new urban areas (housing estates) under mass housing programmes has transformed urban planning and urban architecture into an independent urban area. Housing units built from pre-fabricated elements in the era still play a crucial role in meeting social expectations (housing), and in the environment culture and social sociological processes that are slowly changing.

=== Organic architecture ===
Imre Makovecz and György Csete's Organic architecture were separated from the official forms.

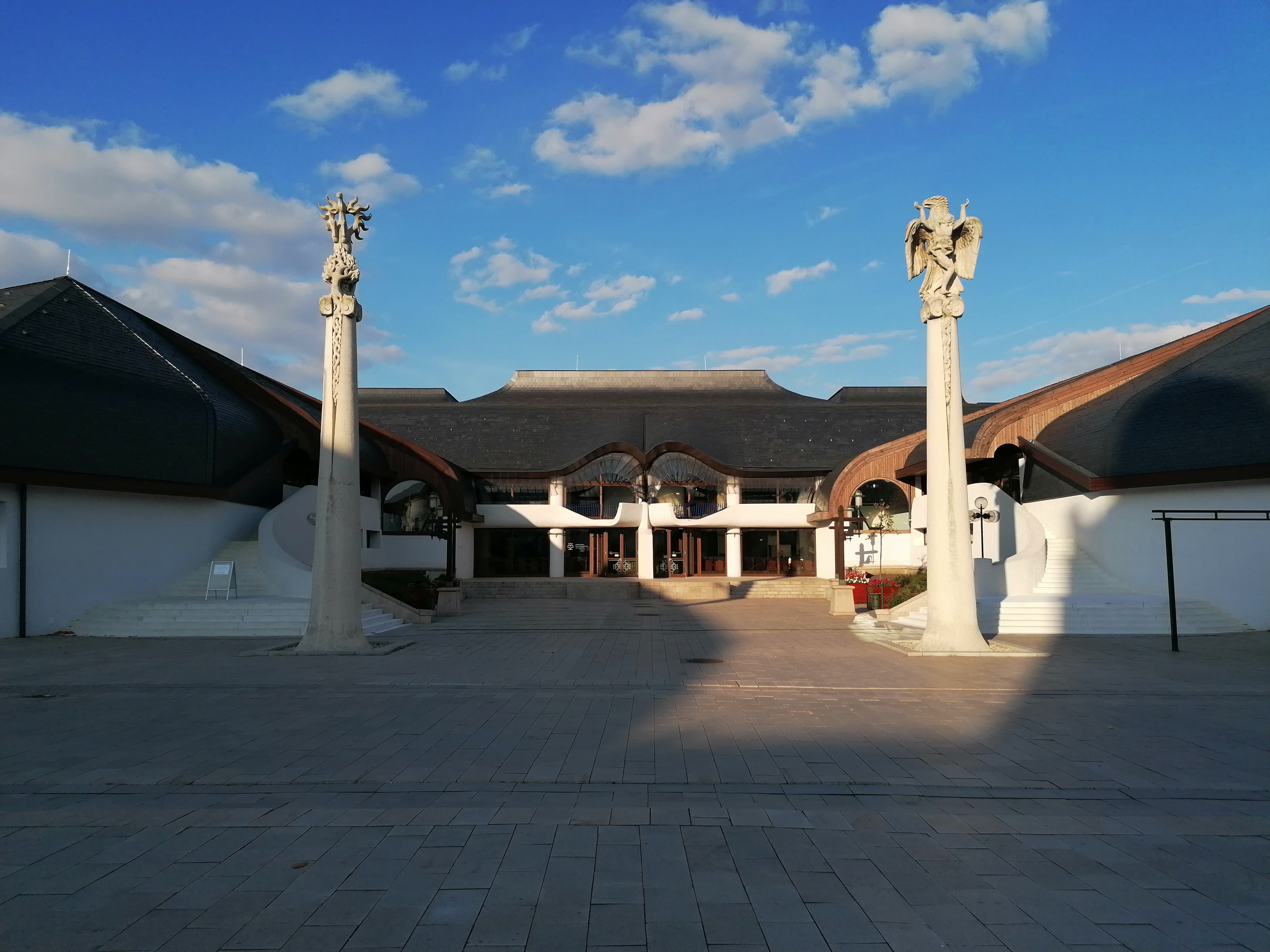
Cultural Center in Sárospatak by Imre Makovecz

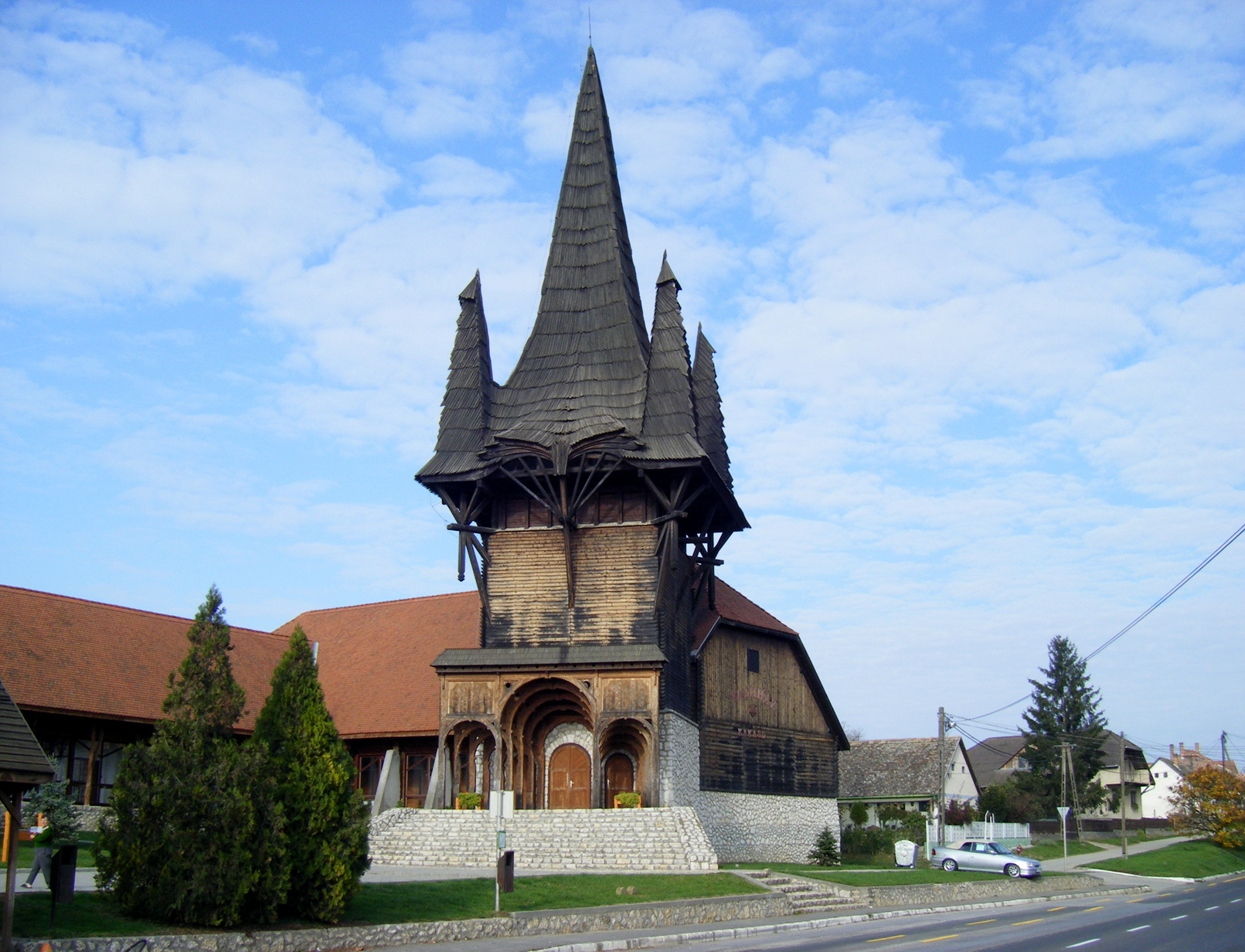
Kakasd Community Center by Imre Makovecz

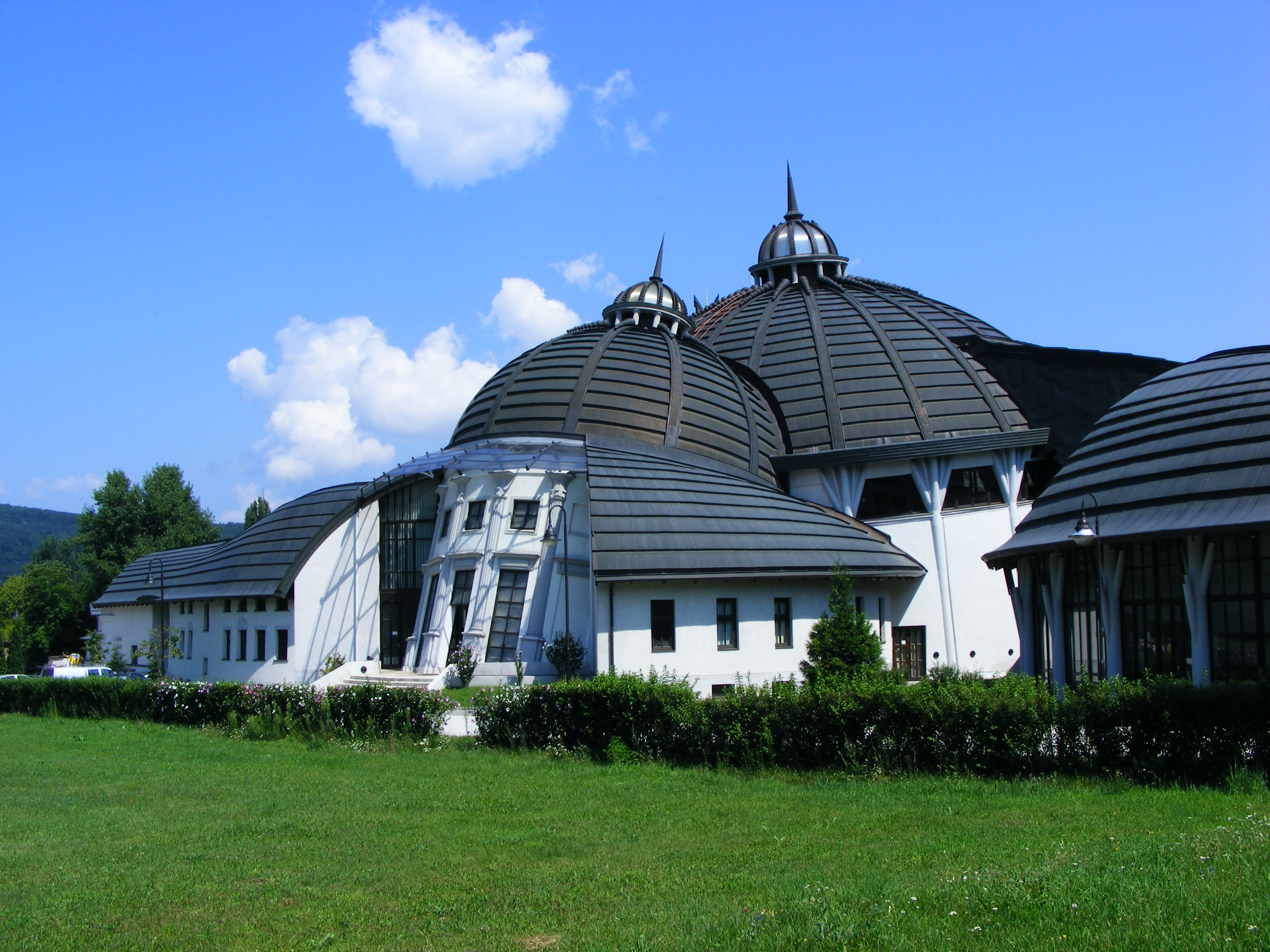
Stephaneum in Piliscsaba by Imre Makovecz

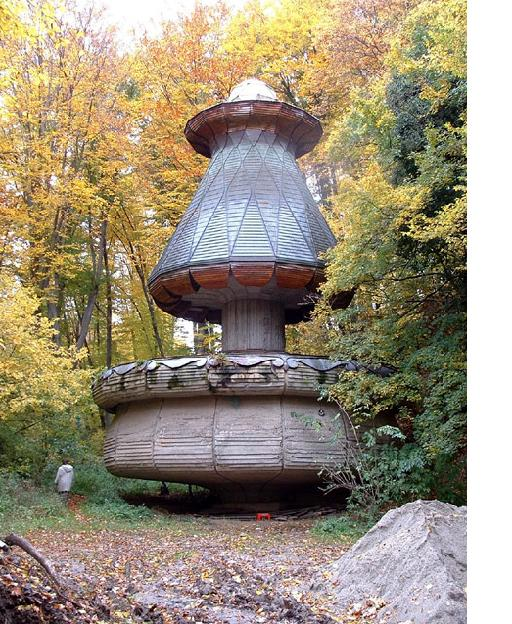
Fountain House by György Csete

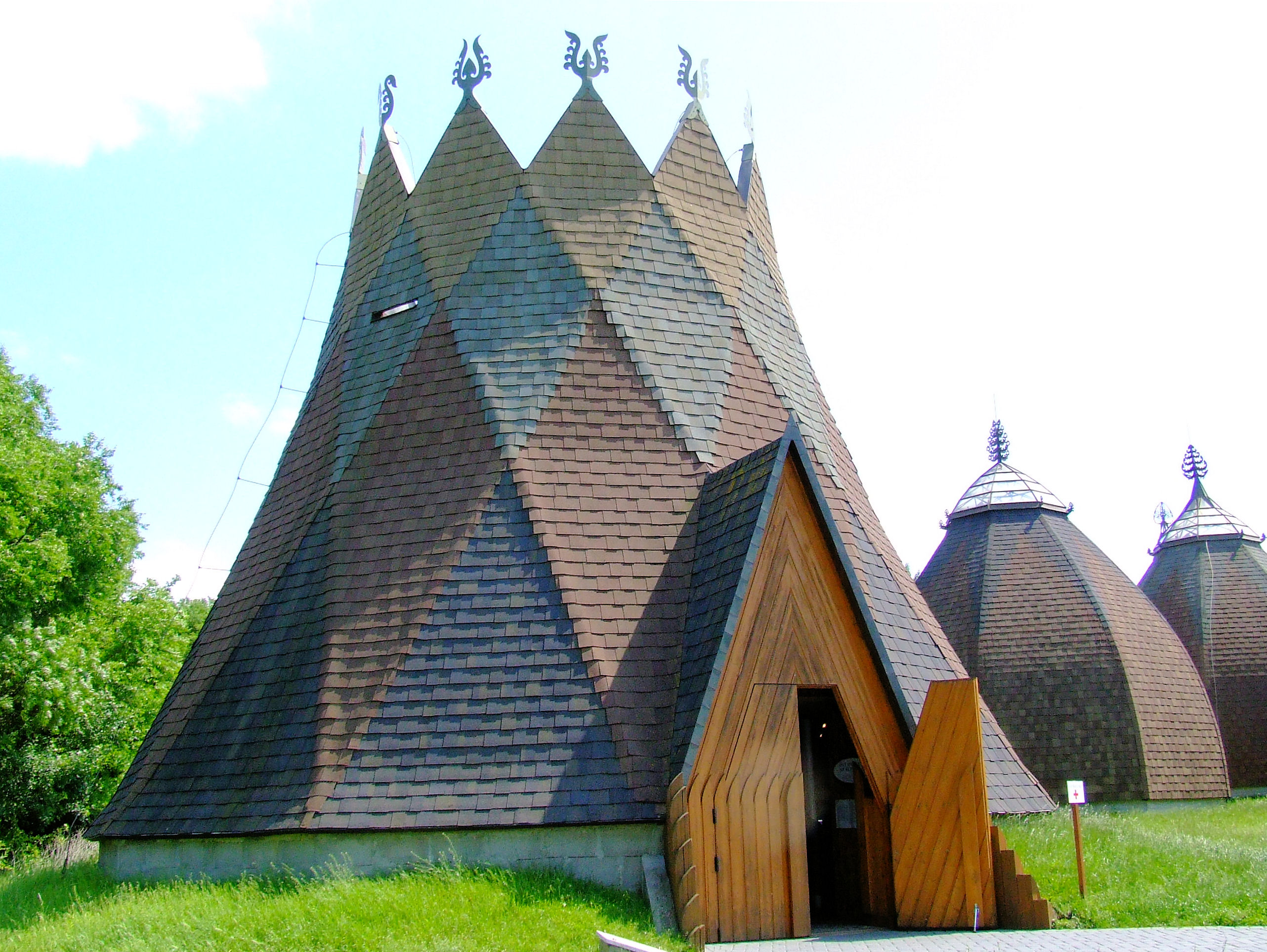
A church of forests in Ópusztaszer National Heritage Park by Csete György

== See also ==
- List of Hungarian architects

== Bibliography ==
- Aggházy - Balogh - Dercsényi - Enzt - Lajta - Németh - Radocsay: An article in the Művészeti lexikon, pp. 142–166.
- Dercsényi D., Zádor A. (1980) Kis magyar művészettörténet (A honfoglalás korától a XIX. század végéig). (Képzőművészeti Alap Kiadóvállalata, Budapest
- Szentkirályi Z. - Détshy M. (1986) Az építészet rövid története. Műszaki Könyvkiadó, Budapest
- Radocsai Dénes: Magyarországi reneszánsz művészet. Képzőművészeti Alap Kiadóvállalata, Budapest
- Aradi N. (főszerk.) (é. n.) A művészet története Magyarországon, Gondolat Kiadó, Budapest
- Fülep L. (főszerk.) (é. n.) A magyarországi művészet története. Budapest
- Gerevich T. (1938) Magyarország románkori emlékei. Royal Hungarian University Press, Budapest
- Henszlmann I. (1876) Magyarország ó-keresztyén, román és átmeneti stylü mű-emlékeinek rövid ismertetése. Royal Hungarian University Press, Budapest
- Marosi E. (1972) A román kor művészete. Corvina Kiadó, Budapest
- Tombor I. (1968) Magyarországi festett famennyezetek és rokonemlékek a XV-XIX. századból. Akadémiai Kiadó, Budapest
- Gerő L. (szerk.) (1975) Várépítészetünk. Műszaki Könyvkiadó, Budapest
- Gervers-Molnár V. (1972) A középkori Magyarország rotundái. Akadémiai, Budapest
- Szőnyi O. (é. n.) Régi magyar templomok. Kir. Magy. University Press, Budapest
- Rados Jenő: Magyar építészettörténet - Műszaki K. Bp. 1961. - ETO72 (439) 091
- Moravánszky Ákos: Építészet az Osztrák–Magyar Monarchiában Corvina K. Bp.1988. ISBN 963-13-2096-0
- Moravánszky Ákos: Versengő látomások - Vince K.1998. - ISBN 9639192 10 4
- Szerk. Éri-Jobbágyi: A Golden Age – Art and society in Hungary 1896-1914 - 1989.10.25. London (Barbican); Miami (C. Fine Arts) - ISBN 0-946372-15-2
- Kiss Tamás: Veszprém, Megyeház-Színház-Múzeum (T-K-M könyvtár)- Bp. OMF-Veszprém VT. - ISBN 963-555-680-2
- Gerle-Kovács-Makovecz: A századforduló magyar építészete - Szépirodalmi K. Bp.1990. - ISBN 96315 42785
- Pamer Nóra: Magyar építészet a két világháború között - Műszaki K. Bp. 1986. - ISBN 963-10-6505-7
