= Jelisaveta Dobrinovic =

Serbian actress (1841-1898)

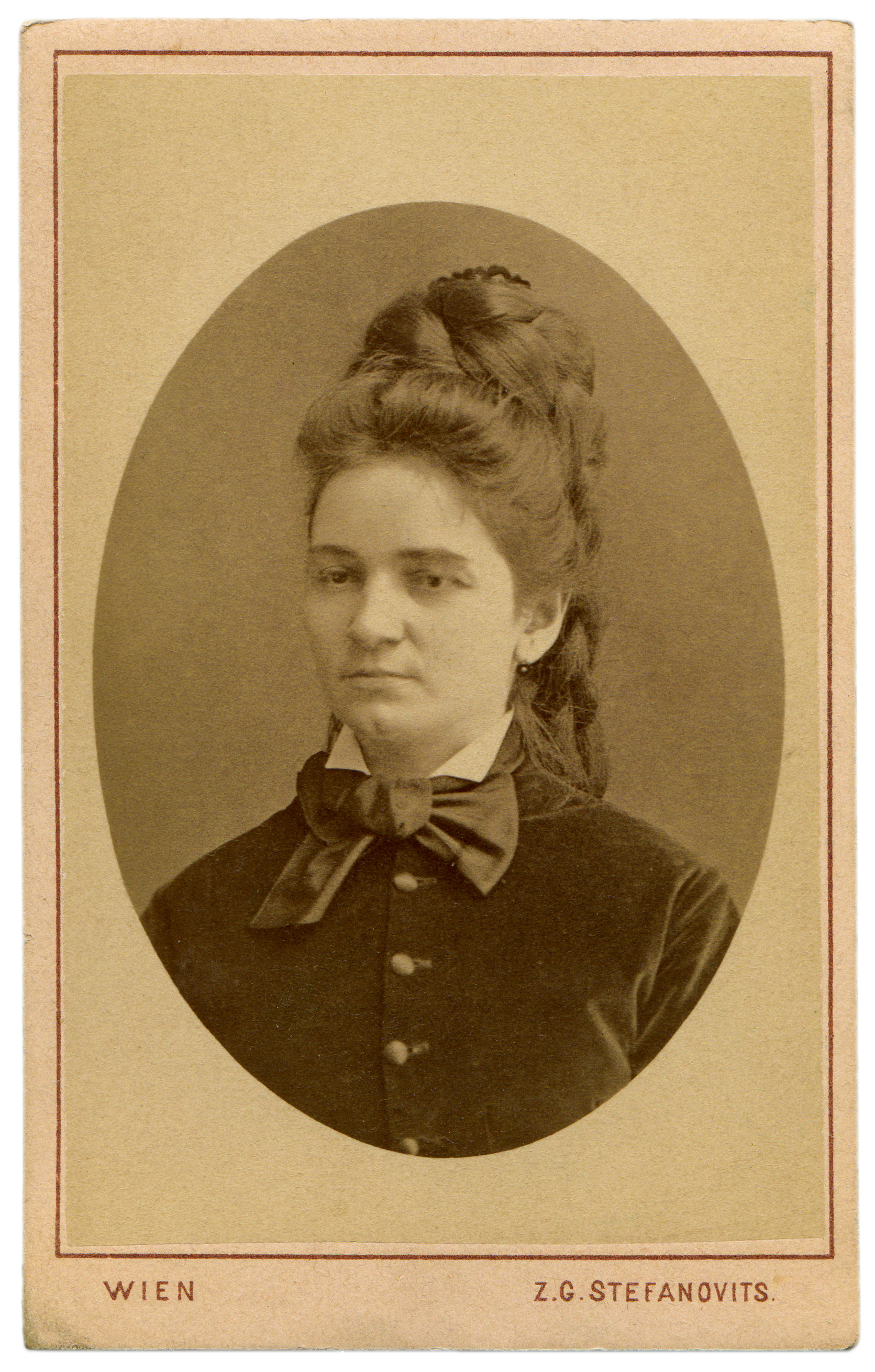
Jelisaveta Dobrinović

Jelisaveta Dobrinović, born Jelisaveta Jeca Popović, (Serbian Cyrillic: Јелисавета Јеца Добриновић) (26 May 1841 - 2 February 1898) was a Serbian actress. She spent her entire acting career at the Serbian National Theater in Novi Sad. She was known for playing the roles of older women.

== Early life ==
Dobrinović was born in Novi Bečej, Austrian Empire as the fourth child of priest Luka Popović and his wife Milica, a housewife. She had six siblings: Ljubica Kolarović, Katica, Draginja Ružić, Sofija, Laza, and Paja, together known as the Popović family. She was homeschooled.

== Career ==
Dobrinović first taught at an elementary school in Sremski Karlovci and Ovsenica, Austrian Empire.

She later became an actress at the age of 27, following in the footsteps of her siblings. She first appeared on the stage of the Serbian National Theater on 4 November 1868 as Ana in the play Carp by Jovan Jovanović Zmaj. Dobrinović entered the stage at the urging of the then manager, Antonije Hadžić, under the condition that she played the roles of older women as often as possible. This condition was honored by the theater.

She celebrated the 25th anniversary of her artistic work, belatedly, on 20 April 1895, as Pelagija Ivanovna Rogoškina, in the play The Joking Rabbit by Ivan Ilyich Mjasnicki.

== Personal life ==
Jelisaveta married Pera Dobrinović, a Serbian actor and director at the Serbian National Theatre.

== Death ==
At the General Assembly of the Society for the Serbian National Theatre on 5 November 1897, a decision was made on Jelisaveta's retirement. However, the Board of Directors could not implement that decision due to her sudden death.

Dobrinović died in Osijek, Austria-Hungary on 2 February 1898.
