= Popović family =

Serbian acting family

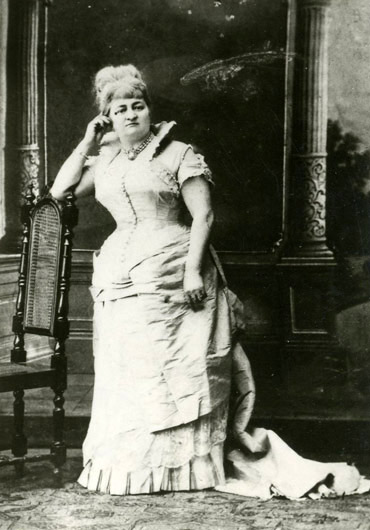
Draginja Ružić

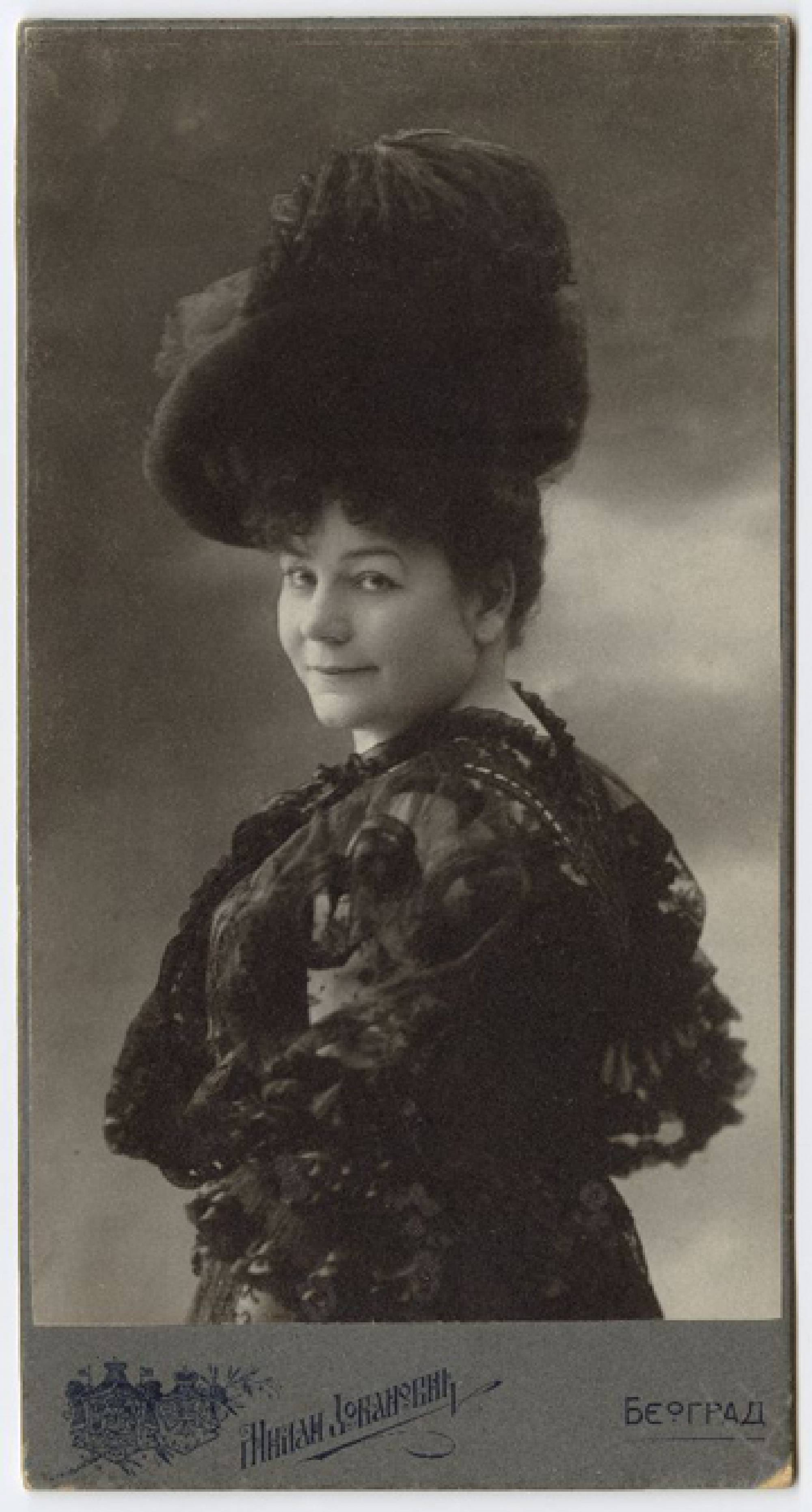
Zorka Todosić in the 1900s

The Popović family (1808–1949) was a Serbian acting family, which included the first modern Serbian theatre practitioners. The ancestor of the family was Luka Popović, a priest originally from Vranjevo. Luka's extended family—including sons and daughters, daughters-in-law, sons-in-law, grandchildren and great-grandchildren—includes twenty-three actors, singers and directors.

Members of the family once made up almost half of the troupe of the Serbian National Theater in Novi Sad. After the founding of the National Theater in Belgrade, they also represented the skeleton of that team.

The Popović family consisted of twenty-three theatrical individuals: five daughters (Katarina Popović, Draginja Popović Ružić, Ljubica Popović Kolarović, Jelisaveta Popović Dobrinović and Sofija Popović Maksimović Vujić); two sons (Lazar Laza Popović and Paja Popovic); six sons-in-law (Dimitrije Ružić, Pera Dobrinović, Dimitrije Kolarovic and Aksentije Maksimović; one per grandchild – Mihailo Markovic and great-grandchildren – Rista Spiridonović); one daughter-in-law (Marija Pecko Adelsheim Popović); seven grandchildren (Emilija Popović, Zorka Todosić, Milka Marković, Luka Popović, Milutin Popović, Zorka Popović Premović and Danica Popović) and two great-grandchildren.

== Luka Popović ==
Luka Popović (2 February 1808 – 1854) was born in Vranjevo, the son of Timotej, a farmer, and Stefanija Popovic. He had two younger sisters: Sofia, born in 1810, and Ekaterina, born in 1812. It is not known if Timotej Popov's entire family changed their surname back to Popović (it was not uncommon for Hungarian authorities then to force Serbian families to drop "ich" at the end of their surname), but Luka did bear the surname Popović as a student of the gymnasium in Sremski Karlovci.

Luka Popović served as a priest in Vranjevo until 1847. He married Milica, a housewife, with whom he had seven children. In 1847, he became a priest in the small village of Ovsenica, in the Romanian part of Banat, and from there to Ivanda.

Luka Popović died in 1854. The care of the seven children fell on his wife Milica and two eldest daughters, 22-year-old Katarina and 20-year-old Draginja. They all lived at their father's modest manse while the younger children went to local schools.

== Descendants of Luka ==
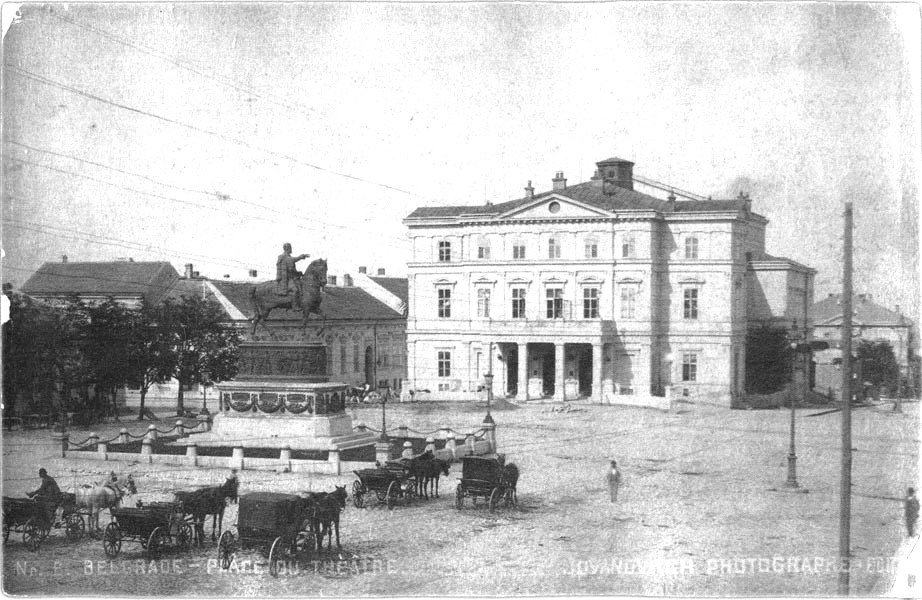
The National Theatre Square in Belgrade, in 1895

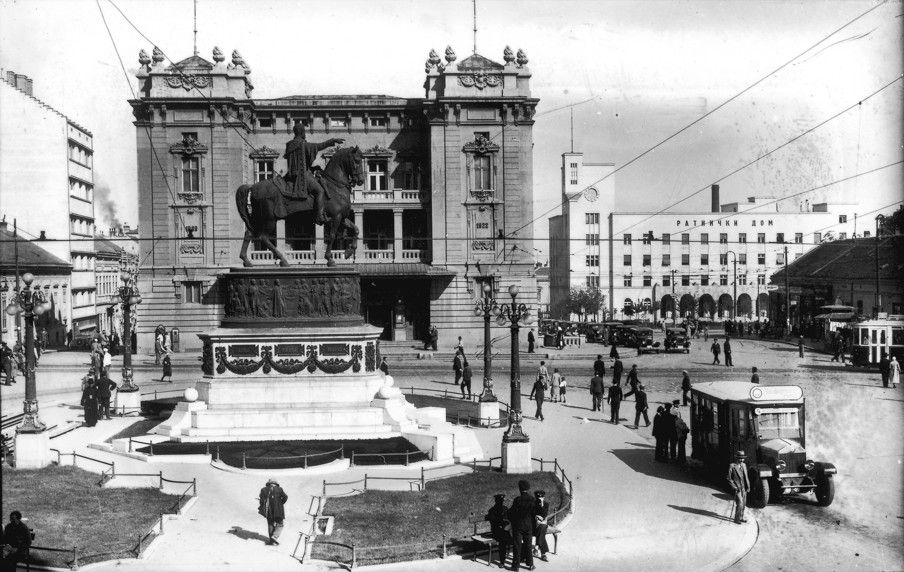
The National Theatre c. 1930

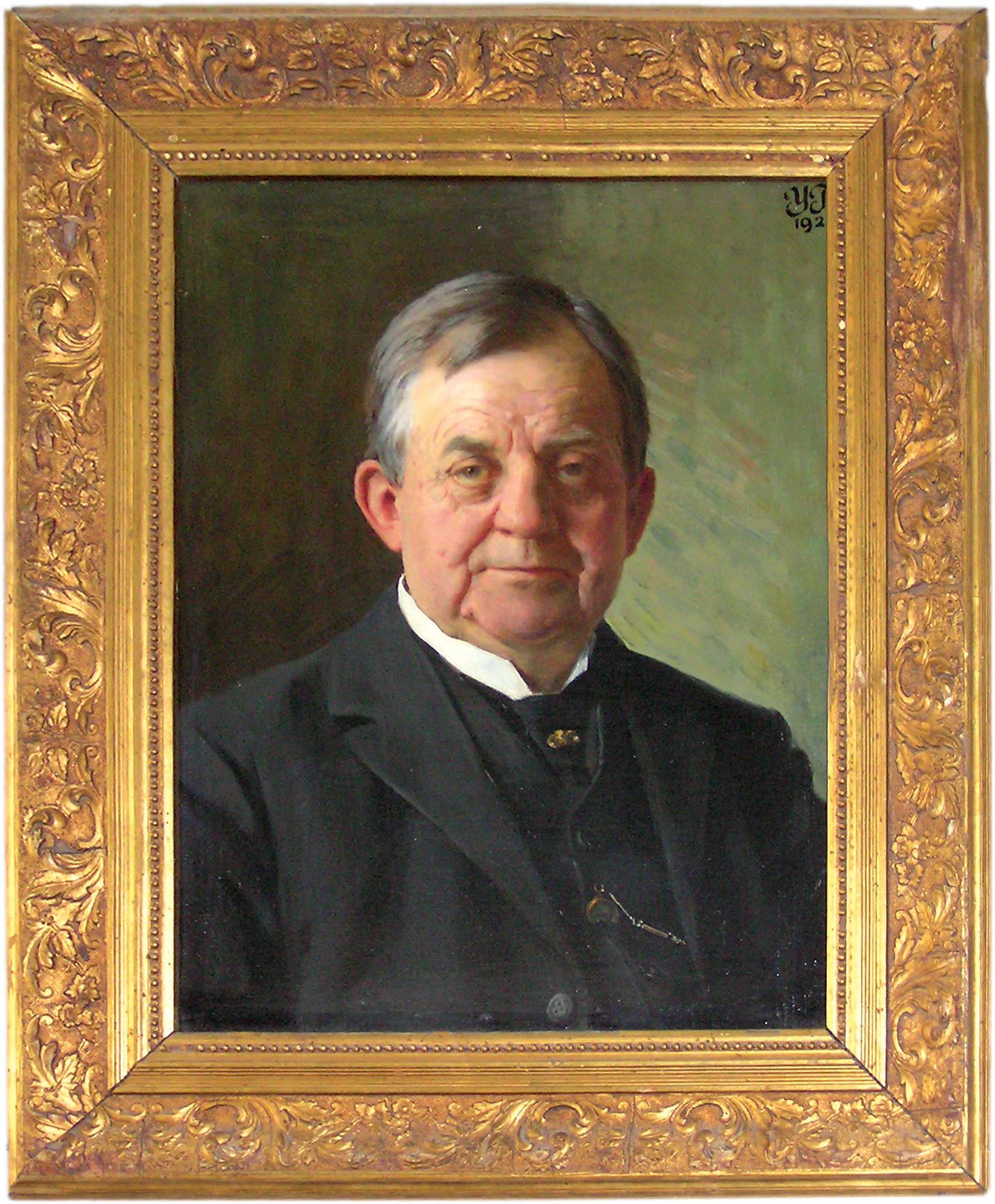
Pera Dobrinović, portrait by Uroš Predić

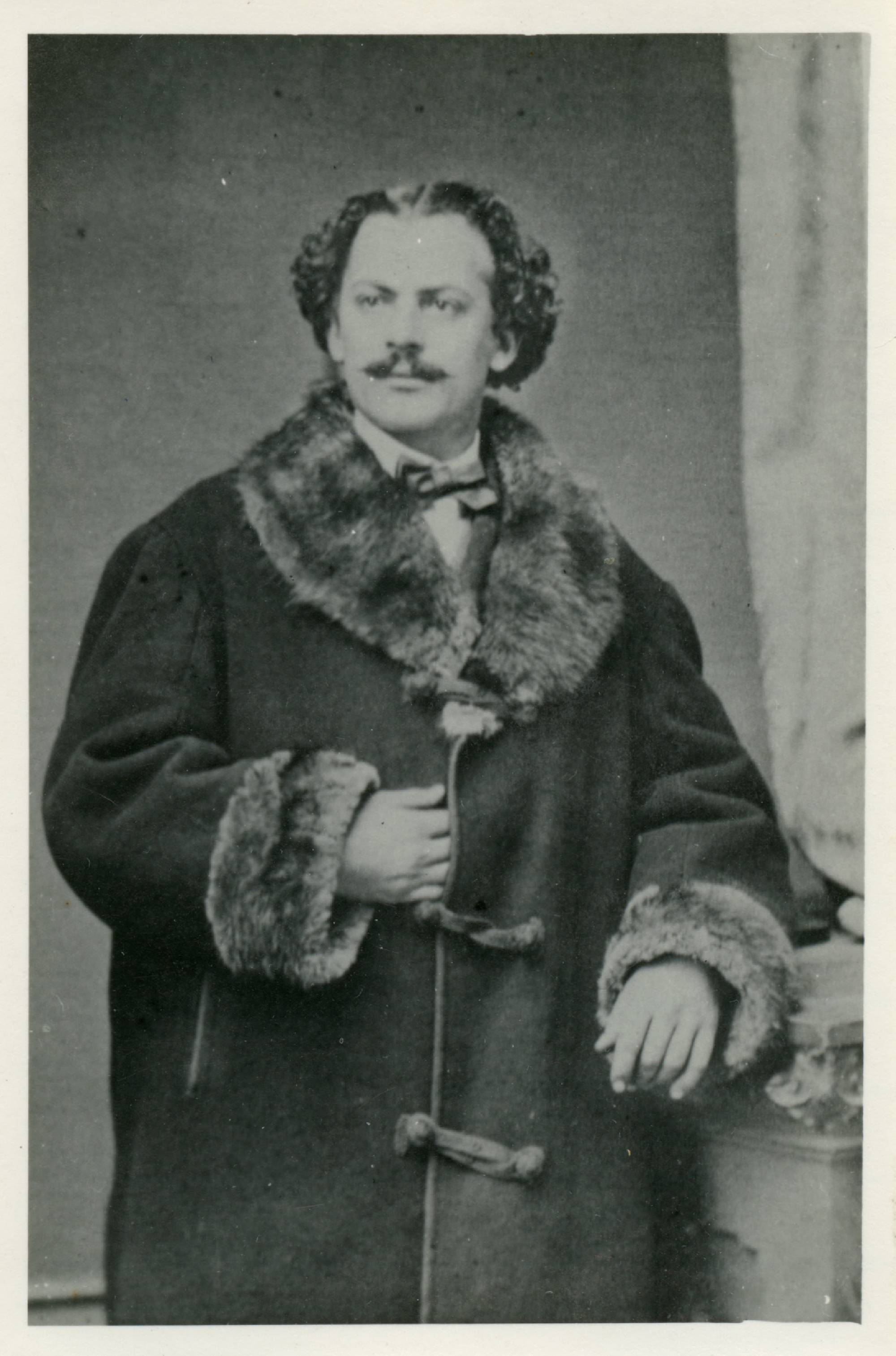
Dimitrije Kolarović, husband of Ljubica Kolarović (Popović)

=== Children ===
==== Katarina − Katica Popović (1832) ====
Katerina Katica Popovic (1832-after 1861) was born in Vranjevo. She was the eldest daughter of Luka Popović. She acted briefly in the theater in Belgrade, and for a few months in 1861 she performed in the Serbian National Theater, primarily in episodic roles. She preferred teaching instead of acting, and within a decade she left the stage to pursue a teaching career.

==== Draginja Ružić (1834–1905) ====
Draginja Ružić (née Popović) was a member of the ensemble of the Serbian National Theater in Novi Sad. She is considered the first Serbian professional actress. She was considered one of the most talented actresses of her time. She was married to the actor Dimitrije Ružić.

==== Ljubica Kolarovic (1836–1890) ====
Ljubica Kolarović (née Popović) was considered one of the best actresses among Serbs in the second half of the 19th century. She began her career at the Serbian National Theater in Novi Sad and then performed in traveling theater troupes, as well as at the Croatian National Theater in Zagreb. She ended her career at the Belgrade National Theater, where she is remembered as one of the first official prima donnas. She was married to actor Dimitrij Kolarović.

==== Lazar-Laza Popovic (1839–1892) ====
Lazar-Laza Popović—actor, director and manager of the traveling theater—was the main director of the Belgrade National Theater for almost all of its first season. He encouraged the establishment of many amateur and professional theaters. Shortly after the death of his first wife, actress Maria Adelsheim-Popović, Laza married Vidosav, a housewife, with whom he had nine children.

==== Jelisaveta-Jeca Dobrinović (1841–1898) ====
Jelisaveta-Jeca Dobrinović (née Popović) started acting at the age of 27, at the urging of Antonio Hadžić, the then-manager of the Serbian National Theater. She agreed to an acting career on the condition that she would only play the roles of older women, a condition the theater's management accepted. She married actor Pera Dobrinović. She remained in her home theater until the end of her career.

==== Sofija Maksimovic Vujic (1851–1921) ====
Sofija Maksimović Vujić (née Popović) was an actress at the Serbian National Theater in Novi Sad, where she spent almost her entire acting career with short breaks. She also played for a short time at the Croatian National Theater in Zagreb. She was married to composer and conductor Aksentije Maksimović, with whom she had a daughter Milica (Milka) Marković. After the death of her first husband, she married the Osijek landowner and merchant Petar Vujić.

==== Paja Popovic (1852–1876) ====
Paja Popović was the youngest child of Luka Popović. He finished his preparatory studies and college and served as a teacher in Deligrad. He began his acting career in 1872 in the troupe of his brother Laza Popović. From September 1, 1874, to November 12, 1875, he was in the troupe of George Peles, and from October 1875 until his death he was a member of the Serbian National Theater. He was buried in the Almaški cemetery in Novi Sad.

=== Grandchildren ===
==== Emilija Popovic (1859–1917) ====
Emilija Popović, daughter of Katarina-Katica Popović, was one of the best Serbian playwrights at the end of the 19th and the beginning of the 20th century. She played in traveling theater troupes and then, until the end of her acting career, at the National Theater in Belgrade. She played the main role in the film "Poor Mother", the third feature film made in Serbia, which unfortunately has not been preserved.

==== Zorka Todosic (1864–1936) ====
Zorka Todosić (born Kolarović) was the daughter of Ljubica Kolarović (Popović) and Dimitrija Kolarović. She was an actress and champion of the National Theater in Belgrade for more than 20 years. She was known as a soubrette in operettas, only to prove herself in comedy and drama in later years. Todosić was among the first singers to perform live on the airwaves of the newly established Radio Belgrade. Married to Milan Teodosijević, she had a daughter named Ljubica Teodosijević who also dedicated herself to theater.

==== Milka Markovic (1869–1930) ====
Milka Markovic (born Milica Maksimovic) was the daughter of Sofia Maksimovic Vujic, of the Serbian National Theater, and Aksentije Maksimovic, a composer and chaplain in the same theater. She is considered to be the first female director in Serbia. She acted in the National Theater in Belgrade and the Serbian National Theater in Novi Sad. She was awarded the Order of Saint Sava for her work. She married actor Mihailo Markovic and had a son, Dimitrij-Mitica Markovic, later also an actor and director of the Serbian National Theater.

==== Luka Popovic (1878–1914) ====
Luka Popović, the son of the actor Lazar-Laza Popović, was a Serbian actor, singer and director, a member of the generation of Serbian actors of the first modern age. As an actor and singer, he performed at the National Theater in Belgrade, the Serbian National Theater in Novi Sad and the National Theater in Skopje, where he also tried his hand as a director. He was also a member of traveling theater troupes. He founded and ran a Serbian theater for emigrants in America, where he met and became close to Michael Pupin.

==== Zorka Popovic-Premovic (1886–1909) ====
Zorka Popović-Premović, the daughter of the actor Lazar-Laza Popović, entered the stage as a girl in 1898 and remained at the Belgrade National Theater until her tragic death in 1909, when she was killed by a male stalker.

==== Danica Popovic (1880 – after 1909) ====
Danica Popović, the daughter of the actor Lazar-Laza Popović, performed at the Belgrade Serbian National Theater from 1900 to February 28, 1909.

=== Great-grandchildren ===
==== Ljubica Teodosijevic (1881–1905) ====
Ljubica Teodosijevic (married Spiridonovic) was the daughter of Zorka Todosić. She was born in 1881 in Zemun. To better prepare for the acting profession, she was educated first in Belgrade and then in Vienna. She entered the stage for the first time on November 24, 1901, in the role of postwoman Christa in the operetta The Birdman, in which her mother became famous. In the same year, she got engaged to the actor Aleksandar Radović, but soon broke off that engagement. In 1903 she married actor Risto Spiridonović. During 1903 and 1904, she performed at the Sinđelić Theater in Niš with great success. She died of tuberculosis in 1905.

==== Dimitrije Mitica Markovic (1896–1949) ====
Dimitrije Mitica Markovic was the son of actress and director Milka Marković and actor Mihailo Marković. As a trained actor and singer, he performed at the Serbian National Theater in Novi Sad and the National Theater in Banja Luka, and as an opera singer he organized art concerts throughout Serbia.
