= Draginja Ružić =

Serbian actress

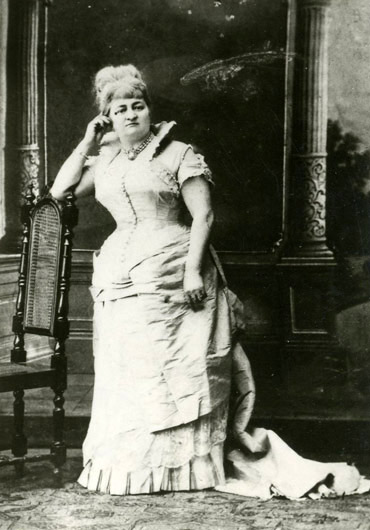
Draginja Ružić

Draginja Ružić (2 October 1834 – 6 September 1905) was a Serbian actress, and a member of the ensemble of the Serbian National Theatre in Novi Sad. She is considered to be the first Serbian professional actress.

== Early life and education ==
Draginja Popović was born in Vranjevo (today's Novi Bečej) on 2 October 1834. She was the daughter of the priest Luka Popović and his wife Milica, a housewife. Her education was limited to finishing elementary school, but she got a good education within the family and gained working habits from them.

Seven members of the Luka Popović family became associated with the Serbian theater, five daughters and two sons. In addition to Draginja, these included Ljubica Kolarović, Katica Popović, Jelisaveta (Jeca) Dobrinović, Sofija Vujić, Laza, and Paja Popović. Together with several others in the broader family circle, including Dimitrije Ružić, Pera Dobrinović, Dimitrije Kolarović and Lazina's wife, Maria Adelsheim-Popovic, this "artistic dynasty" for some time constituted almost half of the Serbian National Theater 's Novi Sad and represented a powerful and highly influential family group, not only in the actor's family, but also in the establishment of the Society for the Serbian National Theater.

== Career ==
Ružić was the first child in her family to leave home. In 1860, she moved to Serbian Čanad, then also part of the Austrian Empire, and entered the amphitheater there. She performed for the first time on 17 July 1860 in the role of Vidosava in Jovan Sterija Popović's tragedy, Ajduci.

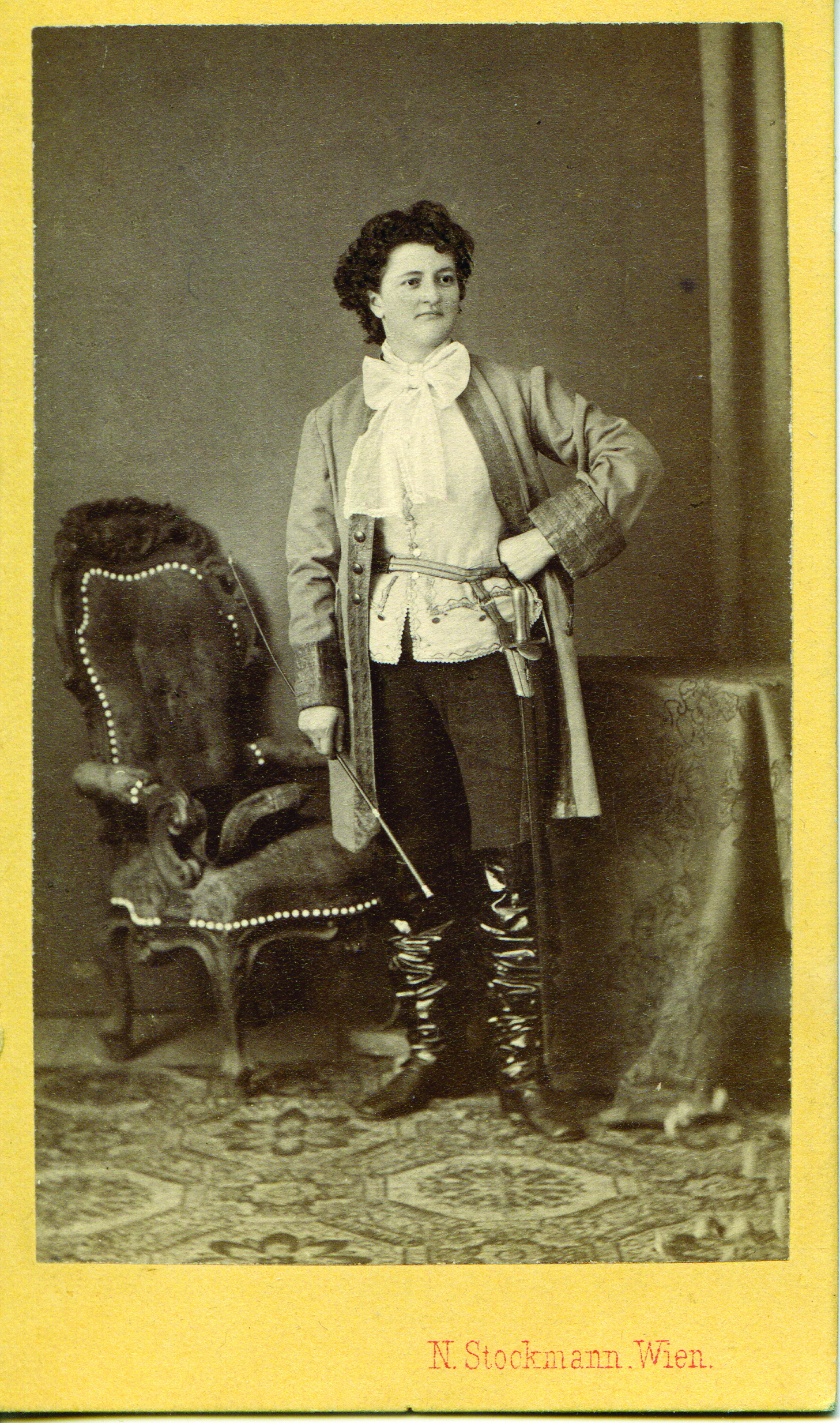
Ružić in costume of colonel in "Memoirs of a Hussard Colonel" by Joseph Mélesville (1882)

From 16 July 1861 till the end of her acting career, Ružić was a member of the Serbian National Theatre in Novi Sad. She had a break from 1863 to 1865 when, in protest of the dismissal of Kolarović, she left the theater along with her husband Dimitri Ružić and sisters Ljubica Kolarović and Sofija Vujic. During that time, she performed in an ad hoc established traveling theater founded by Kolarović, and together, from July to October 1863, she organized a series of shows. After that, until 1865, she performed at the Croatian National Theatre in Zagreb. The second break was between 1872 and 1873 when she played for a short time at the National Theater in Belgrade.

Ružić was one of the best actresses of the Serbian National Theater in Novi Sad. She was noticed from the beginning of her acting career, and over her career she played a diverse array of characters, in comic, serious, and singing roles. It is believed that she played around 350 roles. Modern critics rank her with the highest-level artists in the world.

She celebrated only one of her anniversaries, the 25th anniversary of the artwork, on 17 April 1886. That same evening, she celebrated her wedding anniversary. Montenegrin Prince Nikola Petrović Njegoš sent her a silver laurel wreath on that occasion. She unexpectedly withdrew from the scene in 1898, at age 64, and with a career of 38 years. Her last role was Jelisaveta in Šiler's piece Spletka i ljubav, played on 27 June 1898. She retired on 13 August 1898.

== Personal life ==
Draginja married her colleague, an actor of the Serbian National Theater, Dimitrije Ružić. They were married at the Krušedol Monastery on 2 February 1862. They had two children, a daughter, Zorka Todosić, and a son, Timu.

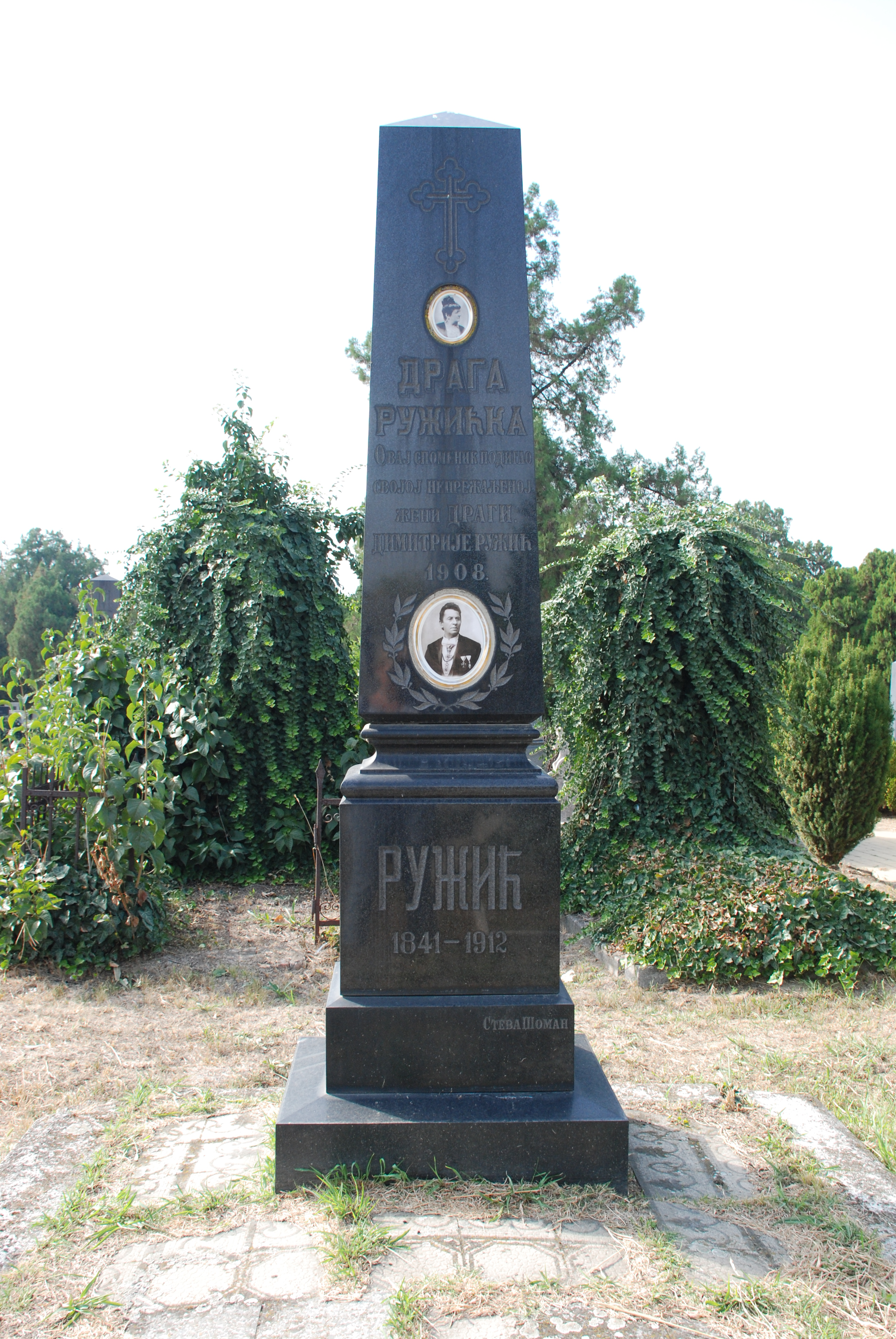
Ružić cemetery marker

Ružić died on 6 September 1905 in Vukovar, at the age of 71. From Vukovar, her remains were later transferred to Novi Sad and buried at Almaška Cemetery, in the same vault with her husband Dimitri.

== Awards and honors ==
- Silver laurel wreath, awarded by the Society for the Serbian National Theater at the celebration of her anniversary. Today, Ružić's wreath is part of a collection of thirteen such wreaths, owned by the Theater Museum of Vojvodina.
- A street in Novi Sad is named after Draginja Ružić.

== Bibliography ==
- Stojkovic, Borivoje S. (1979). History of the Serbian theater from the Middle Ages to the modern age: (drama and opera) . Belgrade: The Museum of Theater Art of Serbia. ( COBISS.SR 46929415 )
- Text Borivoja S. Stojkovic, a professor from Belgrade for the Yugoslav Encyclopedia JLZ 1968.
