= Arača =

- Арача
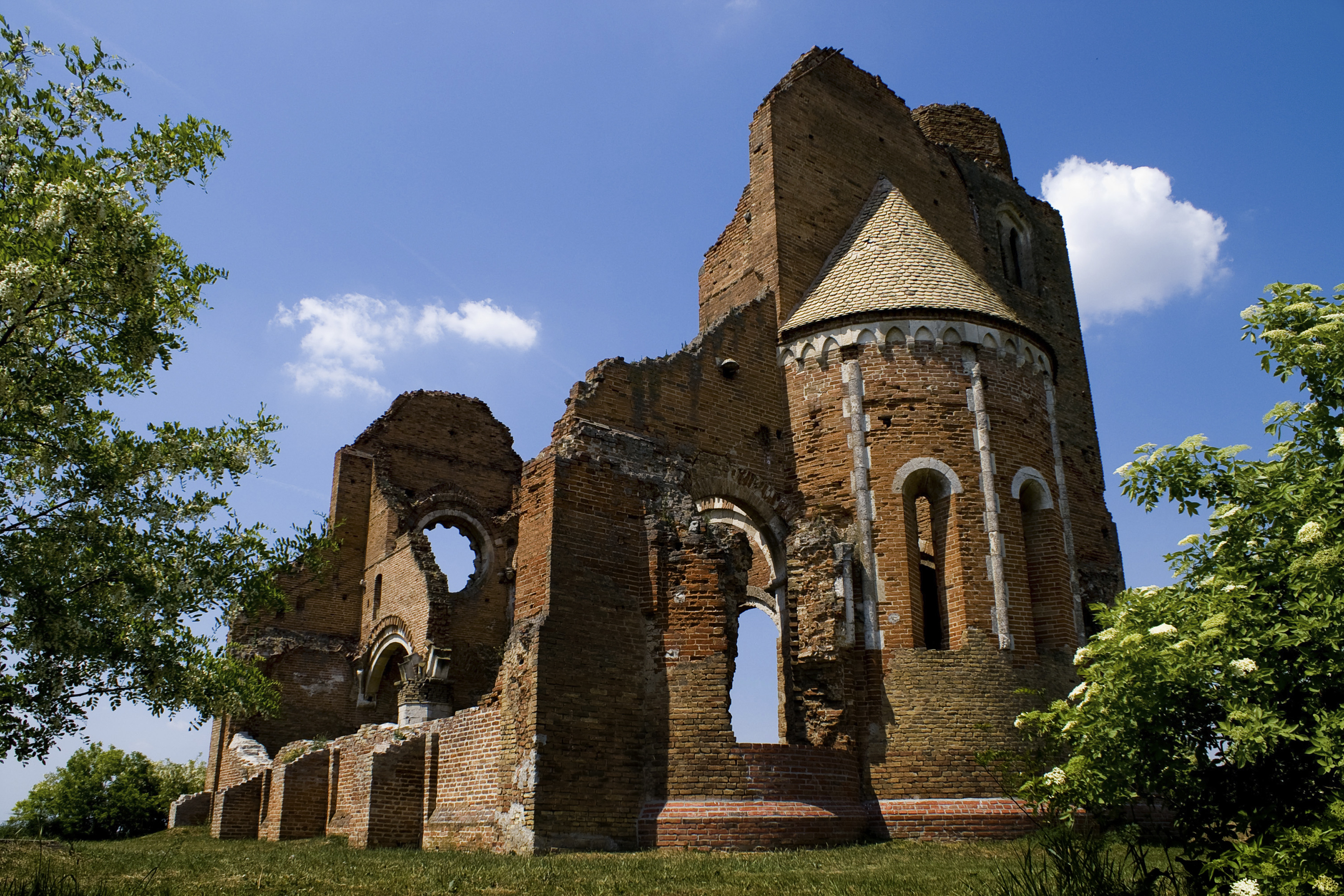
- Arača ruined church, 2009.
- Arača
- Location: Novi Bečej
- Country: Serbia

History
- Status: Ruins
- Founded: ~1230
- Founder: unknown

Architecture
- Heritage designation: Monument of Culture of Exceptional Importance
- Style: Romanesque
- Demolished: 1551

Arača (Serbian Cyrillic: Арача; Hungarian: Aracs) is a medieval Romanesque church ruin located about 12 km north of Novi Bečej, Serbia. The Department for protection and scientific study of Cultural Monuments in Belgrade issued a decision in 1948, in which the Romanesque church of Arača was placed under state protection.

== History ==
It was built in the Kingdom of Hungary around 1230 and then went through hardships thorough its history: it was robbed and devastated in 1280 and then reconstructed in 1370 as required by Queen Elizabeth at which time the Gothic tower as seen nowadays, was probably built.

In 1417 Serbian despot Stefan Lazarević took control of it. Later it belonged to Serbian despot Đurađ Branković who gave it away to Pál Birinyi. In 1551 Ottomans burned the cathedral down and it was never reconstructed again. In the end of the 18th century it was owned by the Sissány family.

Extensive excavation and general protection of the archaeological sites and conservation-restoration works took place in the period 1970-1978 organized by Regional Institute For Protection Of Cultural Monuments / Vojvodina, Novi Sad /, and they were headed up by archaeologist of Vojvodina Museum Sandor Nagy in Novi Sad. Conservation and restoration work, and work on technical documentation were organized by Miomir Petrović, technician conservator of the Provincial Institute for the Protection of Cultural Monuments, with the involvement of Milka Čanak, conservator of the Republic Institute for Protection of Cultural Monuments, Belgrade.

== Location ==
The ruin is on the right terrace, about 13 km east of the Tisa river bed. The church and monastery are on the bank of Crna bara at an altitude of 80.00 meters. This swampy depression is on the same altitude as the Tisa.

Arača was connected with Bečej fortress, on the bank of the Tisa, and nowadays the route is still visible through the middle of the raster field, with a length of about 13 km.

== Excavations ==
Excavations organized at the end of the 19th century were submitted to light findings that greatly enriched the knowledge of Arača, and simultaneously became the trademark of this place. Excavation was led by archaeologist Gerece Péter in 1896. Arača stone soon became the subject of interest and discussion, speculation, and analysis that is largely related to the review and interpretation of characters in one of the broad side plates. To a lesser extent, commented the ornaments on the sides of the same plate.

== Protection of cultural monuments and natural rarities ==
The state takes care of the site, and the Law on Protection of cultural monuments and natural rarities of SFR Yugoslavia and solutions from 16 February 1948 said this: "The Arača-Romanesque church in ruins at Vološinova, county of Begej, AP Vojvodina is considered as national importance monument, and it is placed under the protection of the state with its immediate surroundings."

The explanation further states: "Three-aisled basilica, Benedictine Dalmatian-type built in the XIII century on the foundations of the older building, the church Arača twice destroyed, and preserved until today, have some parts of its massive buildings which can be used for studying the cultural history of our people."

This decision preceded the modest excavations carried in 1946 by Đorđe Mano-Zisi.

In the Tisa River where Arača is, this kind of the foundation have already been seen. In addition to that good, practical, simple and permanent solution, it is certain that for those who have established Arača, these places of the world had a deeper meaning, primeval later transpose to the ideas of Christianity.

Basilica of Arača is the three-aisled, with three semi-circular apses, from inside and outside. The width of the apse in the middle of the ship is about 4.9 m, with a depth of about 2.6 m. The width of the apse side is about 2.7 m, with a depth of about 1.4 m. Organization, relations and dimensions of apses, pointing to the parish church.

Arača was declared Monument of Culture of Exceptional Importance in 1990, and it is protected by Republic of Serbia.

The Department of Material Engineering of the Faculty of Technology in Novi Sad in cooperation with the Provincial Institute for the Protection of Cultural Monuments has begun a series of sampling and testing of the materials used in building Arača in 2015.

== See also ==
- Monument of Culture of Exceptional Importance
- Tourism in Serbia
