= Maria Adelsheim-Popovic =

Serbian actor (1822–1875)

Maria Adelsheim-Popovic (1822-1875), was a stage actress in the Austrian Empire and later Austria-Hungary. She belonged to the elite of the pioneer generation of actresses at the Croatian National Theatre in Zagreb (1860) as well as of the Serbian National Theatre (1866), both within the Austrian Empire when they started.

She was born in the Austrian Empire. She made her debut in a German language theater in 1846. She played a pioneer role in the Serbian language theater. She was referred to as one of the best actors of his time in Serbia, and as a member of the pioneer generation of the Serbian national theater educated several later Serbian star actors, notably Pera Dobrinović.
