= Zorka Todosić =

Serbian stage actress and operetta singer

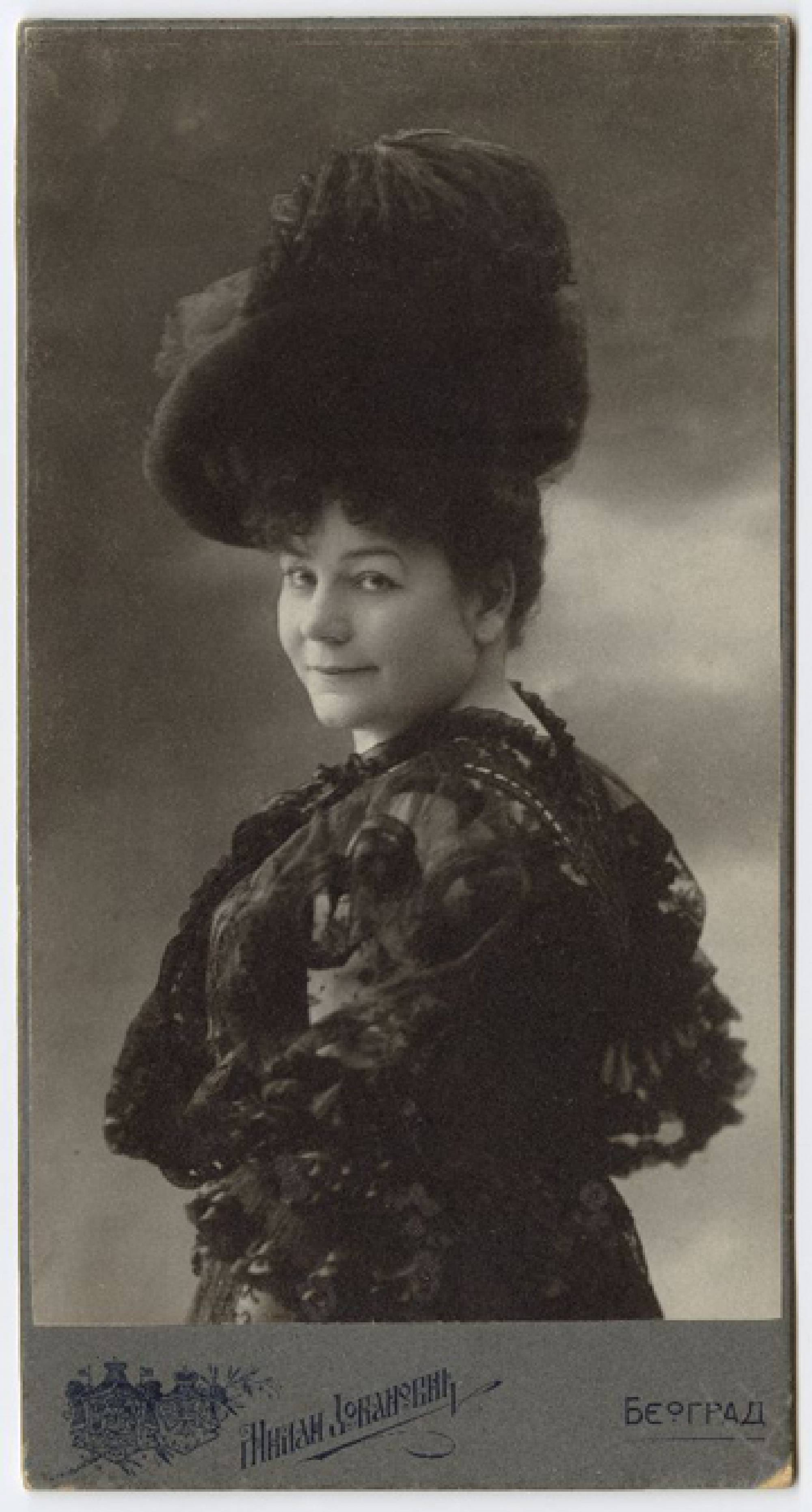
Zorka Todosić in the 1900s

Zorka Todosić (1 April 1864 – 28 December 1936, in Cyrillic Зорка Тодосић) was a Serbian stage actress and operetta singer, associated with the National Theatre in Belgrade.

== Early life ==
Zorka Kolarovic was born at Novi Sad, the daughter of Dimitrije Kolarovic (1839-1899) and Ljubica Kolarovic (1836-1890), both actors, and part of the Popović family. She was raised and educated in Belgrade. She studied music and acting with Davorin Jenko and Tosa Jovanović.

== Career ==
Zorka Kolarovic began performing in childhood with her parents. She joined the National Theatre in Belgrade as a young woman, and was a star there for decades. She was billed as "Zorka Todosić", originally by mistake, but she kept the simplification of her married name as her stage name. She was the first to play Borislav Stanković's Koštana when the play debuted in 1900, and she played the role for the next six years. She was often cast in "soubrette" roles, especially in adaptations from Molière.

Her acting career ended when she developed memory problems associated with dementia; her last stage appearance was in Skopje in 1915.

== Personal life ==
Zorka Kolarovic married banker Milan Teodosijevic; she cared for him through a long terminal illness, taking a break from her stage career from 1880 to 1886. She was also involved with poet Vojislav Ilić, before he died in 1894. Zorka Todosić died in 1936, more than twenty years after her last stage role. She was 72 years old.

Her story was told in a documentary series on television in Serbia in 2017, to mark the 150th anniversary of the National Theatre.
