= Novi Bečej =

Novi Bečej Нови Бечеј (Serbian) Törökbecse (Hungarian)
- Town and municipality
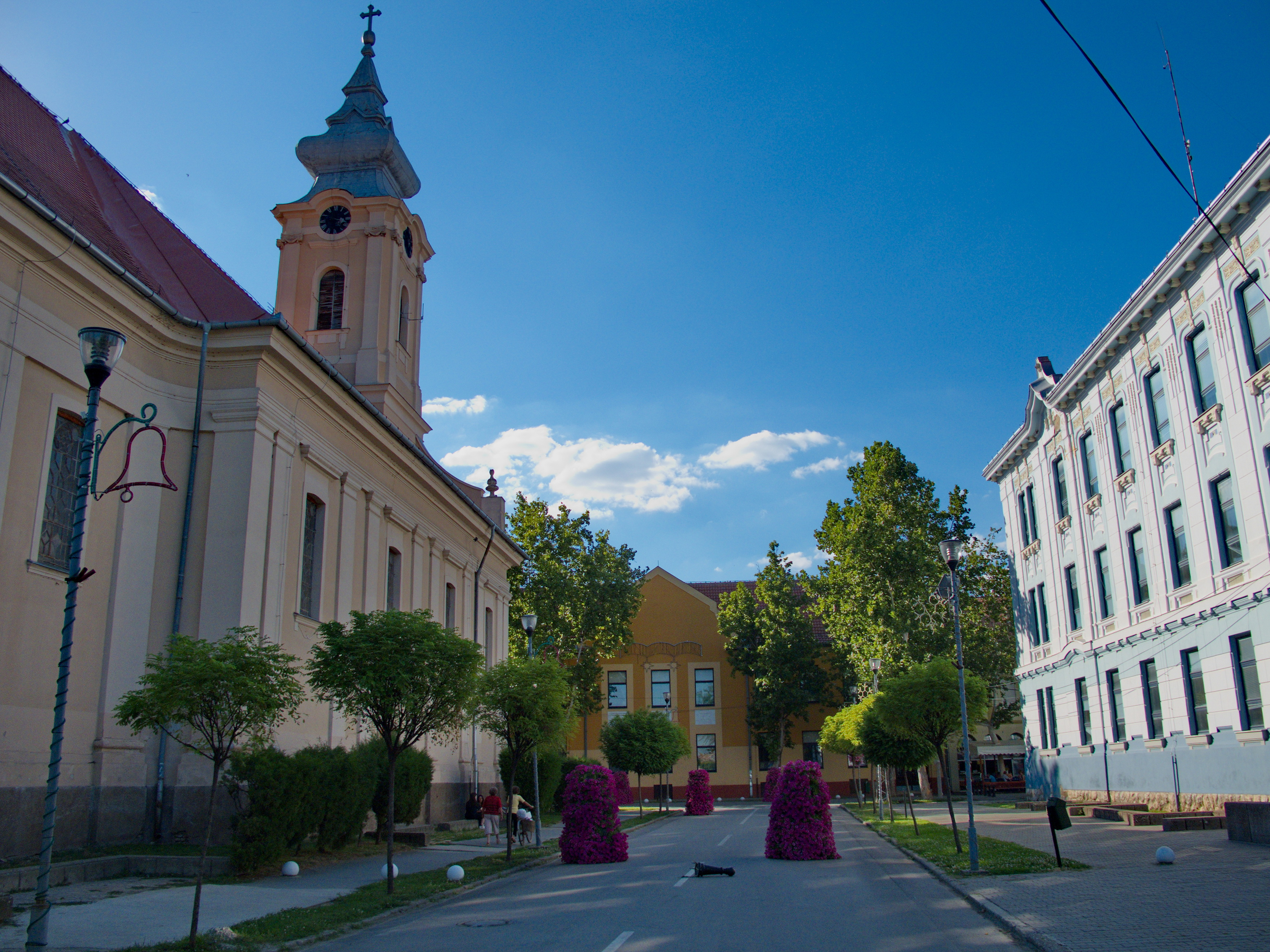
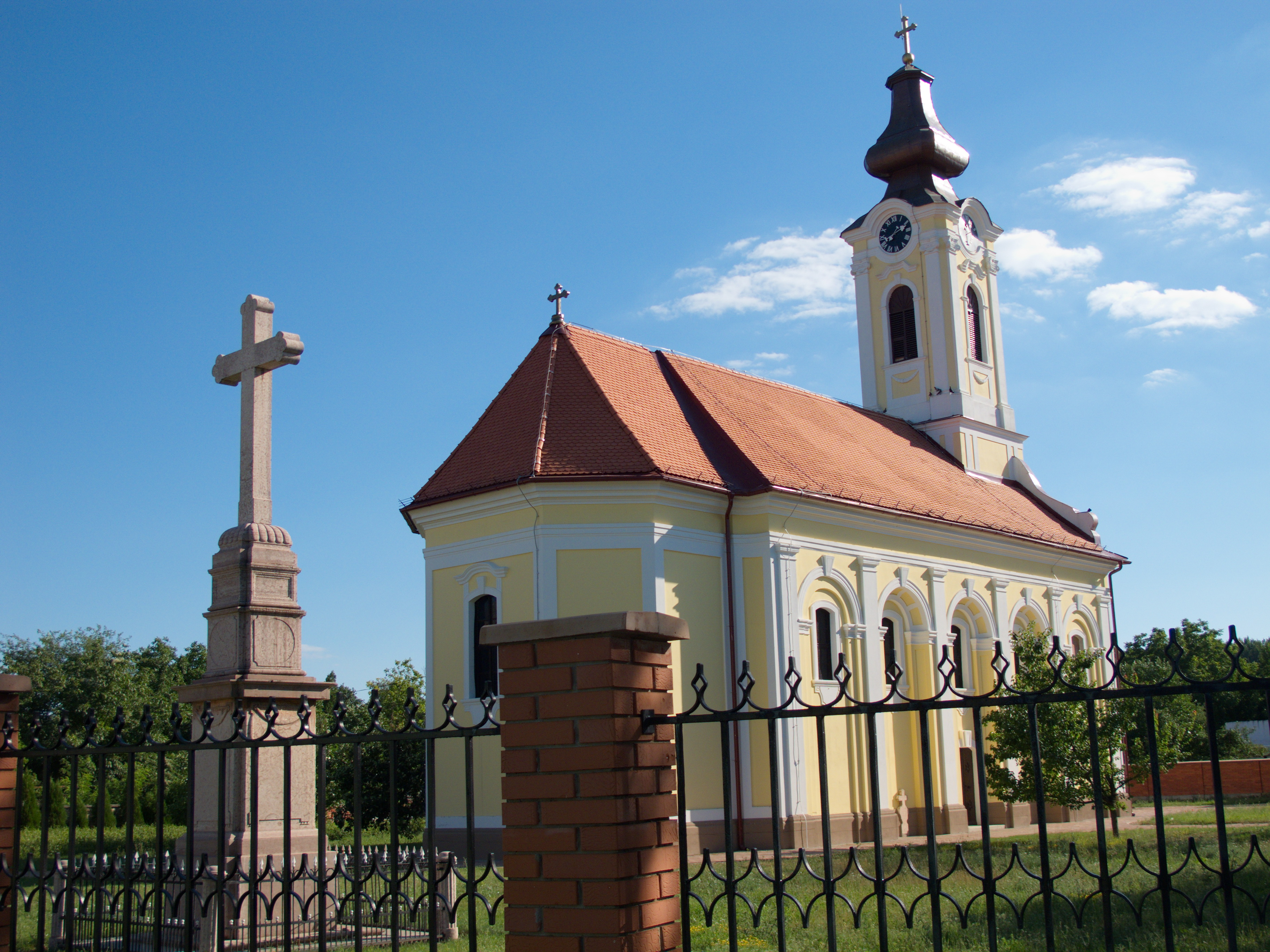
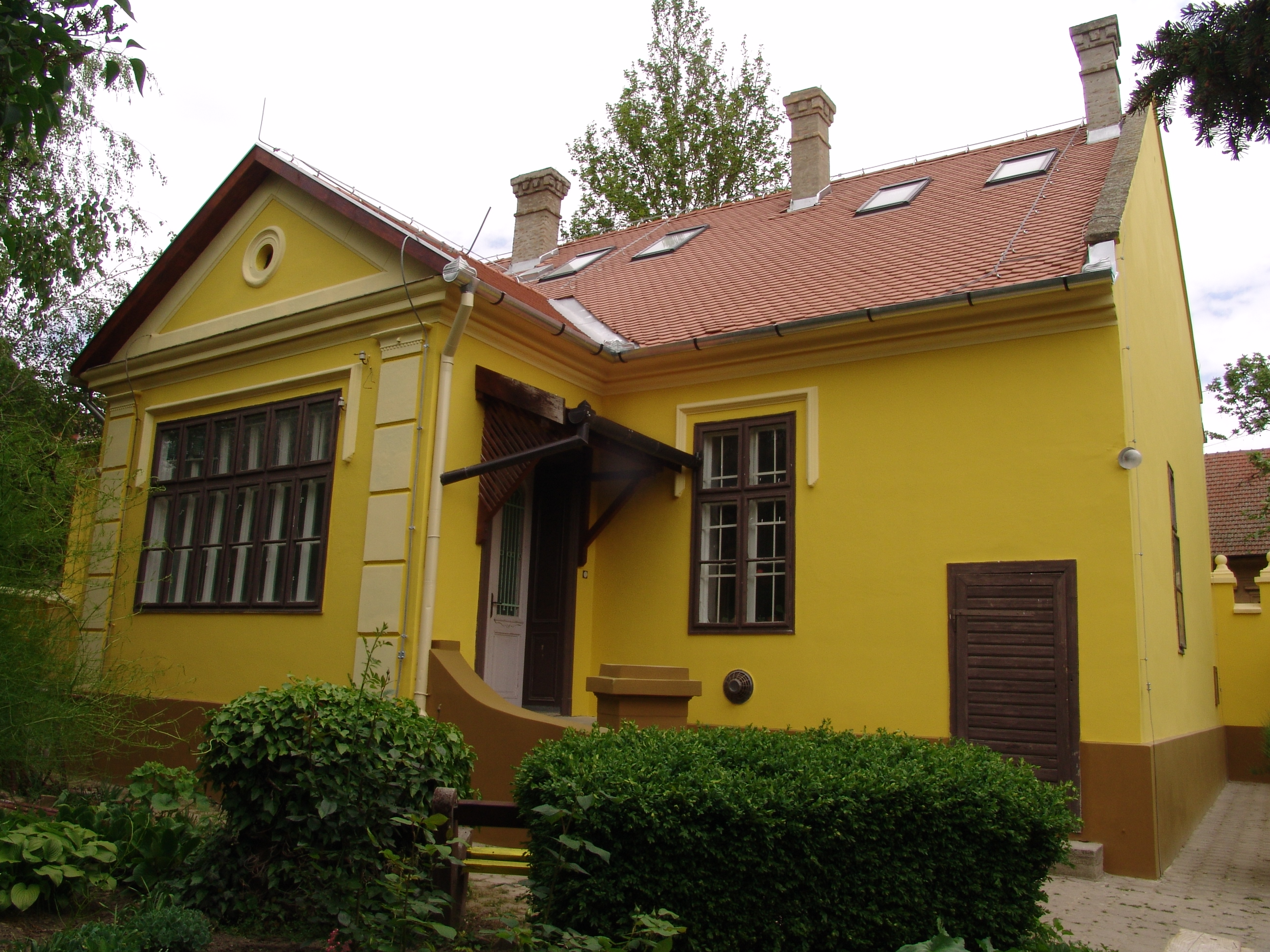
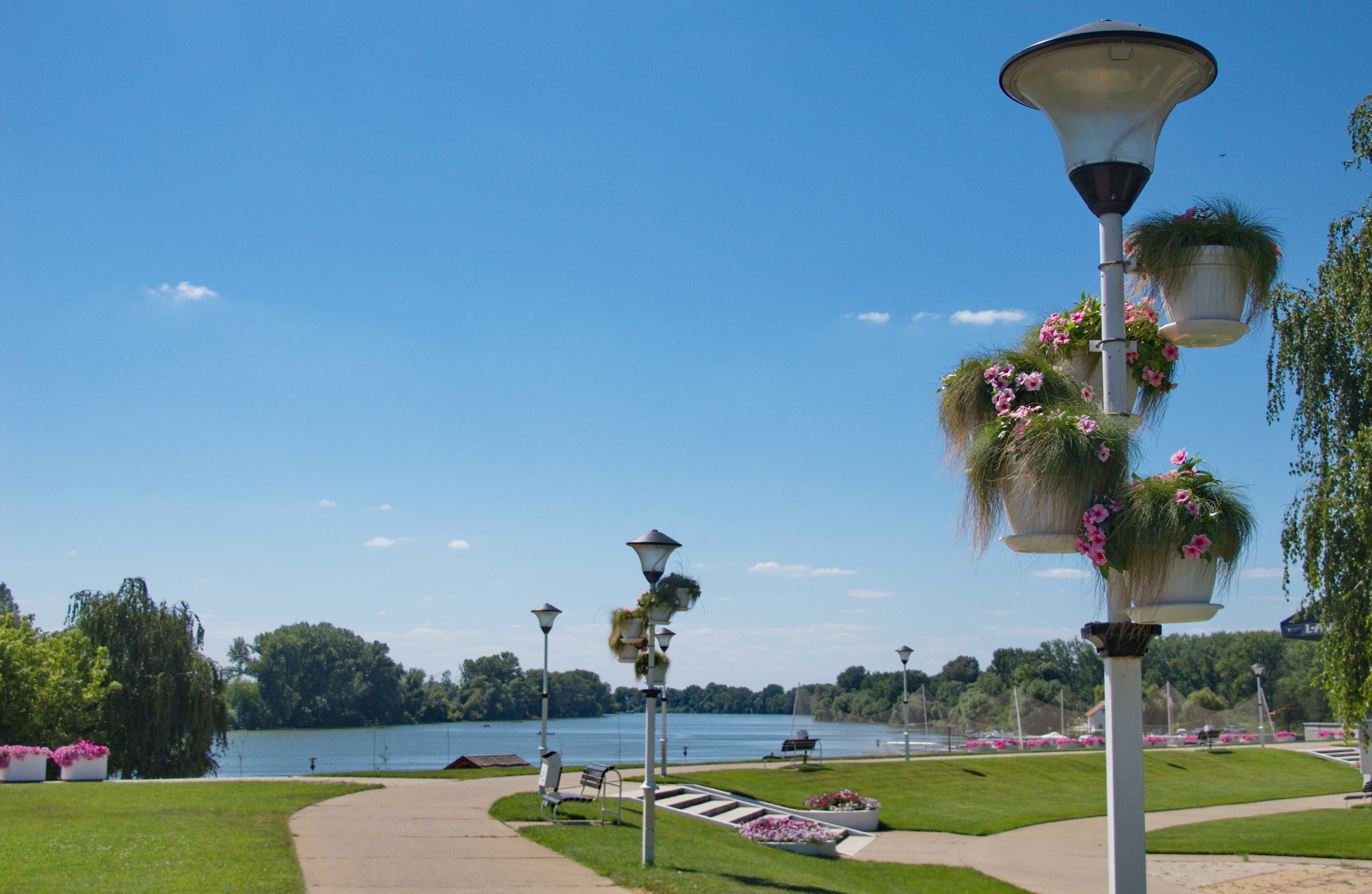
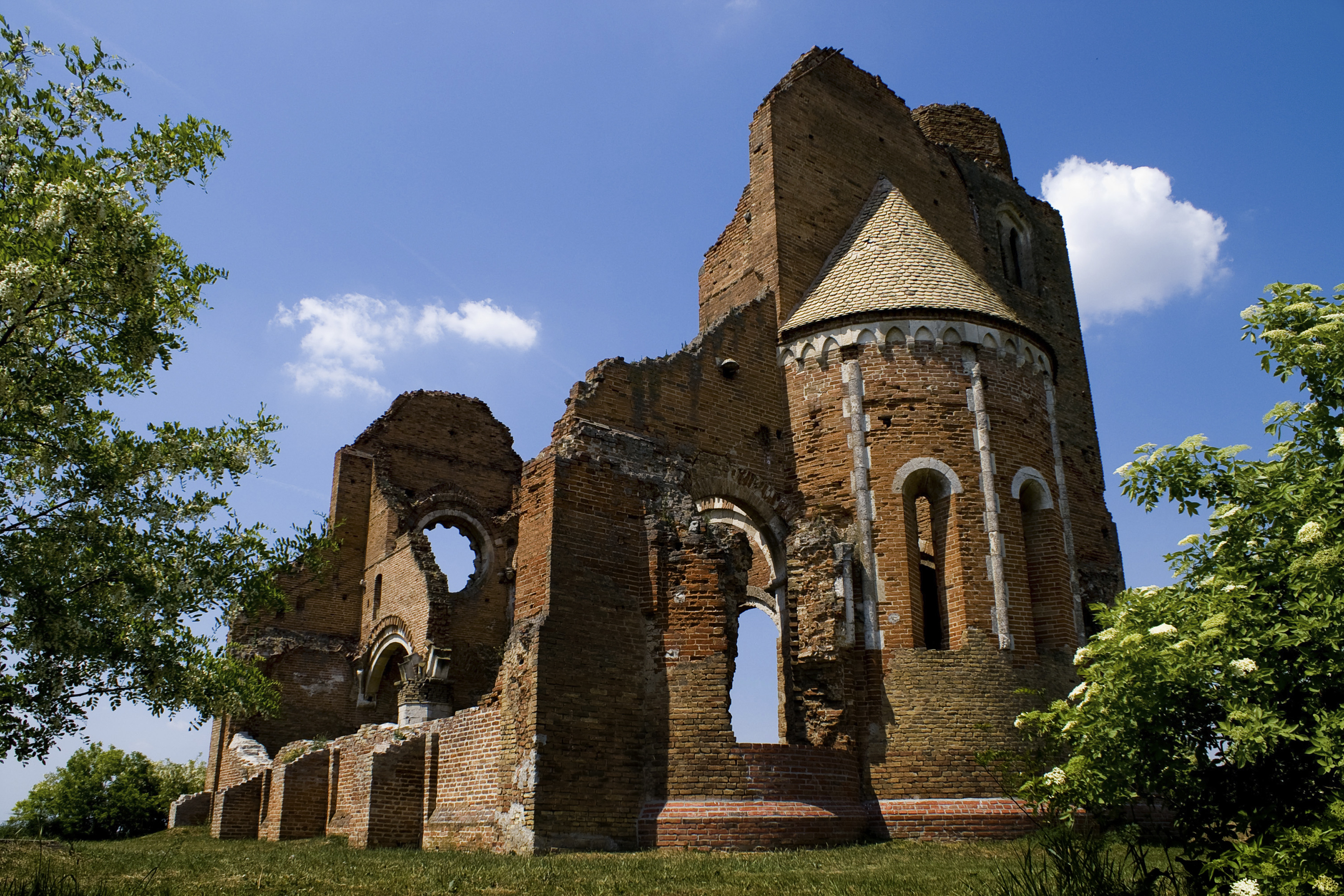
- From top: Old part of Novi Bečej, The Serbian Orthodox church of Saint Nicholas, National Library building in Novi Bečej, riverfront, Ruins of the medieval Catholic church of Arača

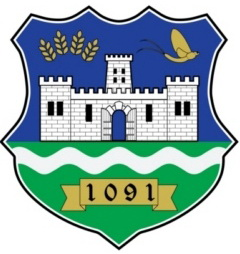
- Coat of arms

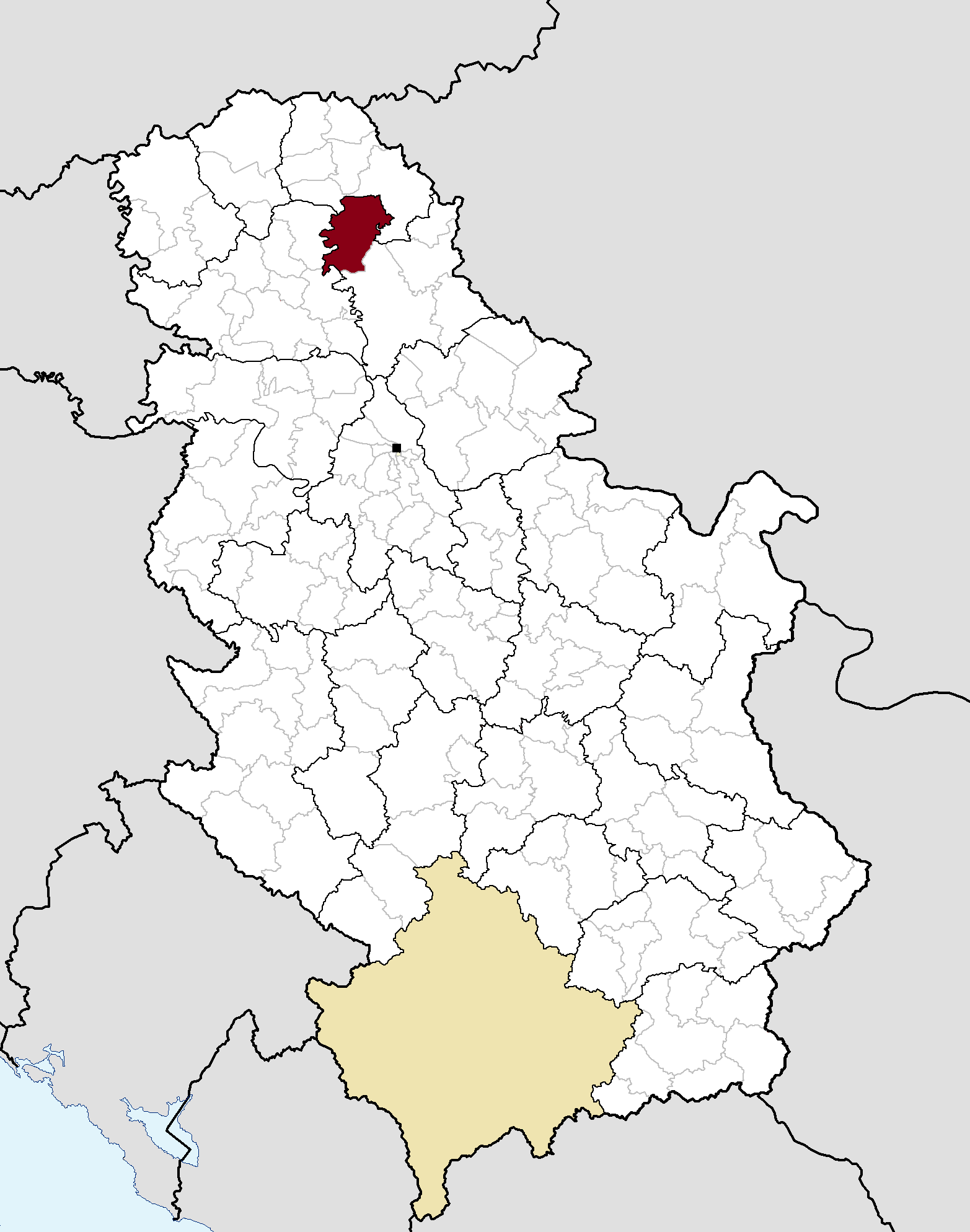
- Location of Novi Bečej within Serbia
- Coordinates: 45°36′N 20°7′E
- Country: Serbia
- Province: Vojvodina
- District: Central Banat

Government
  - Mayor: Saša Maksimović (SNS)

Area
  - Total: 609.0 km^{2} (235.13 sq mi)
- Elevation: 76 m (249 ft)

Population (2022)
  - Total: 19,886
  - Administrative: 10,967
- Demonym(s): novobečejci, (sr)
- Time zone: UTC+1 (CET)
  - Summer (DST): UTC+2 (CEST)
- Postal code: 23272
- Area code: +381(0)23
- Car plates: ZR
- Official languages: Serbian together with Hunagrian
- Website: www.novibecej.rs

Novi Bečej (Serbian Cyrillic: Нови Бечеј, Hungarian: Törökbecse) is a town and municipality located in the Central Banat District of the autonomous province of Vojvodina, Serbia. The town has a population of 10,967, while Novi Bečej municipality has 19,886 inhabitants (2022 census).

== Name ==
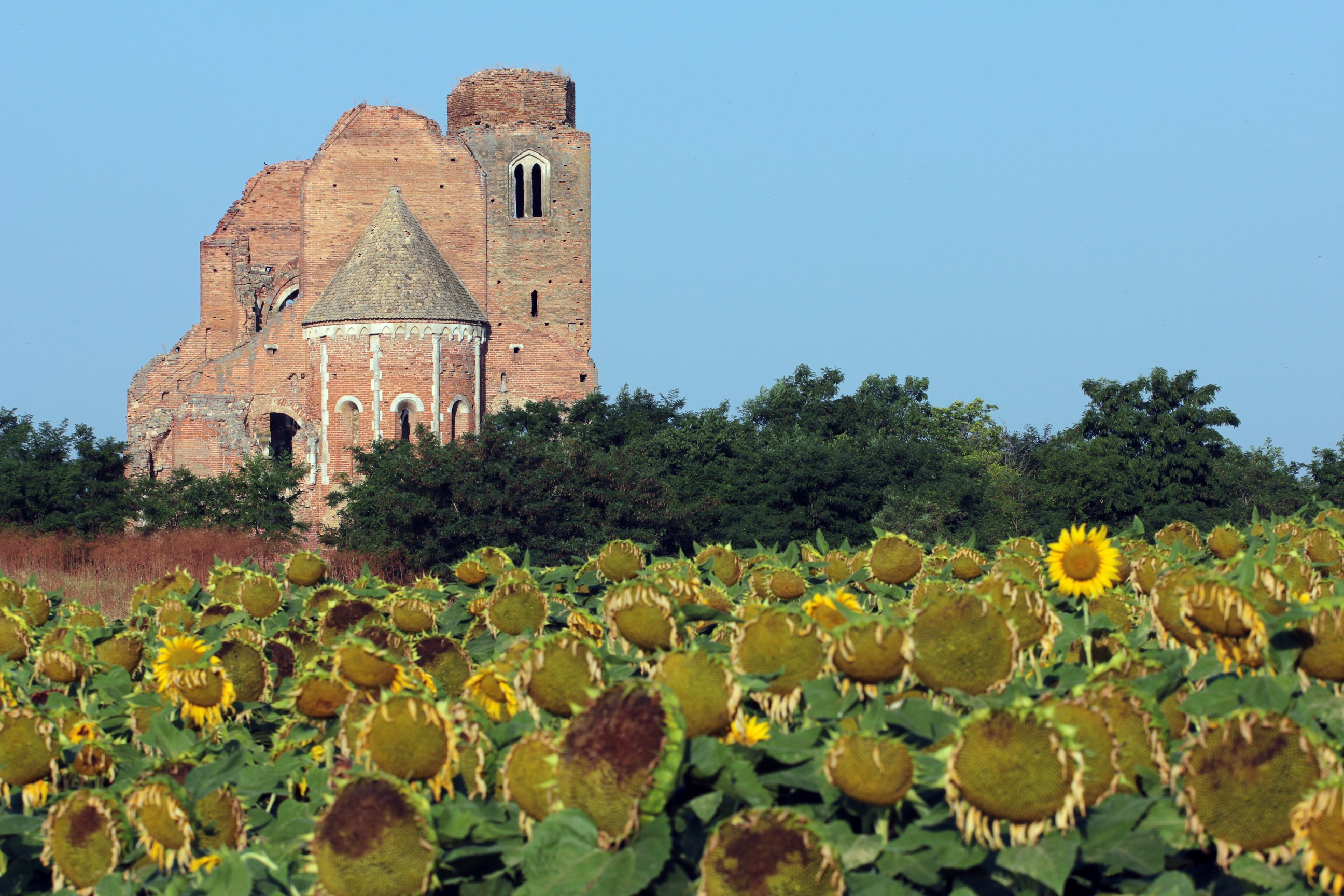
Ruins of the medieval Catholic church of Arača (Aracs)

Novi Bečej means "New Bečej". In the past it was known as Turski Bečej (Serbian Cyrillic: Турски Бечеј, "Turkish Bečej"), while the current town of Bečej, across the river Tisa (in the Bačka region) was in the past known as Stari Bečej (Serbian Cyrillic: Стари Бечеј, "Old Bečej").

There are several theories about town's name origin. The first one is that it derives from Castellum de Beche, which was the name of the fort located near today's town center. The other theory is that the name was given after the family Wechey, which used to rule the settlement and the land around modern-day Novi Bečej. The town was also known as Turski Bečej (Турски Бечеј). In 1919 it was renamed Novi Bečej (Нови Бечеј).

For a short period of time after the World War II, from 1947 to 1952, the name of the town was Волошиново (Vološinovo) after the Red Army Colonel Lavrenty Voloshinov who died in the battle for the liberation of the town.

In Serbian, the town is known as Novi Bečej (Нови Бечеј), in Hungarian as Törökbecse and in German as Neu-Betsche. Both Serbian and Hungarian are officially used by municipal authorities.

== History ==
12th century BC ornithomorphic pendants were found in the town. The Dacians inhabited the region before the Roman conquest in the second to first century BC.

The town was first mentioned in 1091 during the administration of the Kingdom of Hungary. In the 15th century, it was a possession of the Serbian despot Đurađ Branković. During the Ottoman rule (in 1660/6), it was populated by ethnic Serbs. Ottomans administered the town as Beçe from 1552 to 1718. Until 1918, it was part of the Habsburg monarchy, then part of the Kingdom of Serbs, Croats and Slovenes and subsequent South Slavic states.

== Inhabited places ==
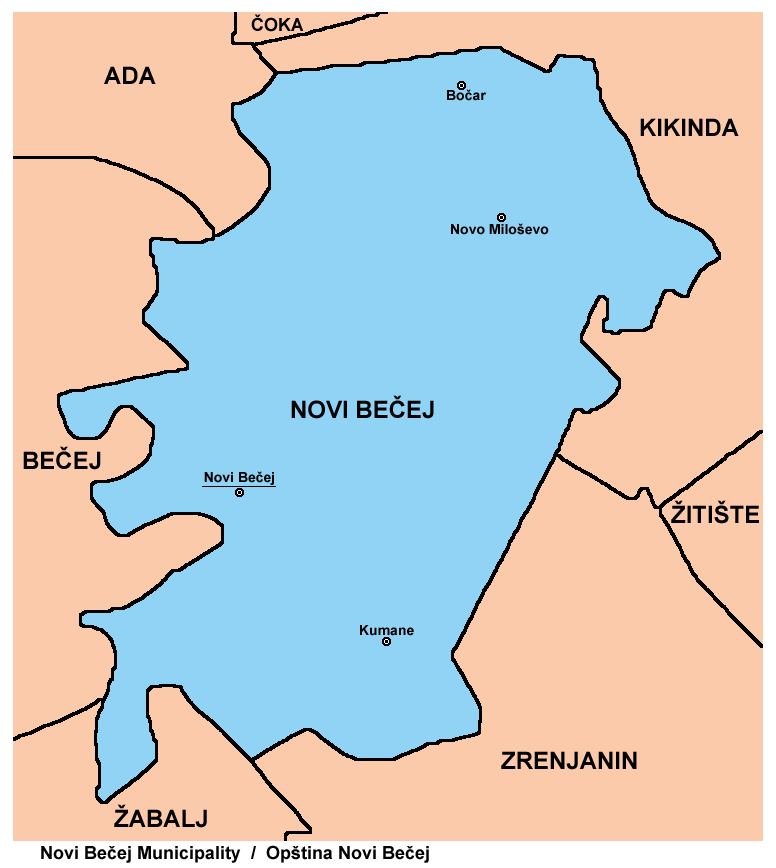
Map of Novi Bečej municipality

Novi Bečej municipality includes the town of Novi Bečej and the following villages:

- Bočar
- Kumane
- Novo Miloševo

== Demographics ==
Historical population
Year	Pop.	±% p.a.
1948	33,229	—
1953	33,682	+0.27%
1961	33,507	−0.07%
1971	31,729	−0.54%
1981	30,312	−0.46%
1991	28,788	−0.51%
2002	26,924	−0.61%
2011	23,925	−1.30%
2022	19,886	−1.67%

According to the 2011 census, the total population of the municipality of Novi Bečej was 23,925 inhabitants.

=== Ethnic groups ===
Municipality

According to the 2011 census, the Novi Bečej municipality has 23,925 inhabitants, including:

- 16,132 Serbs (67.43%)
- 4,319 Hungarians (18.05%)
- 1,295 Romani (5.41%)
- 2,179 Others and undeclared (9.11%)

All settlements in the municipality have an ethnic Serb majority.

Town

The town of Novi Bečej had 13,133 inhabitants, including:

- 7,738 Serbs (58.92%)
- 3,210 Hungarians (24.44%)
- 609 Romani (4.64%)
- Others and undeclared Yugoslavs (12.00%)

== Economy ==
There are several factories operating in Novi Bečej, but the leading branch of economic development is tourism. The town is located on the river Tisa, and thus it offers many leisure opportunities. One of the most notable large companies are IGK Polet (ceramics industry, member of Nexe group), PD Vojvodina (agricultural combine, member of MK Group) and Serbia Manufacture (shoes industry).

The following table gives a preview of total number of employed people per their core activity (as of 2016):

Activity	Total
Agriculture, forestry and fishing	220
Mining	1
Processing industry	1,450
Distribution of power, gas and water	12
Distribution of water and water waste management	72
Construction	69
Wholesale and retail, repair	625
Traffic, storage and communication	88
Hotels and restaurants	79
Media and telecommunications	8
Finance and insurance	26
Property stock and charter	1
Professional, scientific, innovative and technical activities	125
Administrative and other services	21
Administration and social assurance	206
Education	302
Healthcare and social work	416
Art, leisure and recreation	31
Other services	61
Total	3,814

== Culture ==
Serbia's fourth largest festival, Velikogospojinski Dani ("Dormition Days"), is held in Novi Bečej. The festival honors the town's patron saint, Mary. It gathers more than 200,000 visitors from across Serbia and surrounding areas. Most popular Serbian, Croatian, and Hungarian singers and bands, such as Lepa Brena, Zdravko Čolić, Severina, Tony Cetinski, Crvena Jabuka, Plavi Orkestar, Željko Joksimović, Edda, Omega, etc. have performed here. Also, great historical legacy is a big boost, since there are remains of a medieval monastery Arača and the old fort.

=== Arača ===
Arača, is a medieval Romanesque church ruin about 12 km north of Novi Bečej. It is one of the older churches built in the region during administration of the Kingdom of Hungary. The department for the Protection and Scientific Study of Cultural Monuments in Belgrade issued a decision in 1948 which placed the Romanesque church of Arača under state protection.

The church was built around 1230, robbed and devastated in 1280, and reconstructed in 1370 at the command of Queen Elizabeth. The Gothic tower that is still extant today probably dates from this time. In the year 1417 it came into possession of Serbian despot Stefan Lazarević. Later it belonged to the Serbian despot Đurađ Branković who gave it as a present to Pál Birinyi. In the year 1551, the Ottomans burned the cathedral down and it was never reconstructed again. At the end of the 18th century, it belonged to Sissány family.

=== Saint Nicholas Church ===
The Serbian Orthodox church dedicated to Saint Nicholas was built in 1774. The belfry was added in 1789, during the Austro-Turkish War of 1788-91. The church was renovated in 1858 and again in 1871, when the bell was enclosed in the new belfry and the cross on the top of it was plated with gold. The church was thoroughly renovated in 1928: icons were rejuvenated, frescoes turned black from the silt and smoke were cleaned, the interior was ornamented with the plated gold and was repainted and decorated, both the exterior and the interior. New floor was built, made from the white-grayish ceramic tiles imported from Czechoslovakia, and the electricity was introduced into the building. The 1928 reconstruction was work of en entire group of artists, artisans and craftsmen, headed by painter Vasa Pomorišac.

The church was renovated again in 1981. Due to the rapid deterioration because of the moist, the Institute for the protection of the cultural monuments drafted a preservation project. The works on the edifice itself were finished by 2018, while the restoration of the icons and other artifacts continued. Artifacts are considered more valuable than the church itself, as they are older. Most of them originated from the older and demolished church dedicated to the Dormition of the Mother of God, which was located on the bank of the Tisza.

=== Other features ===
German Ethnic House

In 2020, German ethnic house was opened for public in the house of Krisztina Link Majer. The house belongs to the so-called švapska kuća type ("Swabian house"), though a bit affluent one, built before World War II. Affluence, apart from having more rooms and larger yard, also means that it has three steps at the door, as the poorer people built houses directly on the ground. Specific architectural style includes mixed brick-earth walls and steep, two-faced hipped roof which was originally made of straw, but later replaced with roof tiles. The yard is elongated, with numerous auxiliary objects, like pantry, horse stable, cart shed, barn and pigsty. Exhibited artifacts are mostly over 100 years old (horse sleds, hand powered corn husker, special clover rake, preserved animal skulls). Some are much older, like the large circle with several planks which was the roof construction of nomadic yurt, or the fifth century leather armor.

Museum of Serbian Diaspora

In 2020 it was announced that the Pivnički House was purchased by the municipality and will be adapted into the Museum of Serbian Diaspora. The Pivnički family was well established and their house, originally purchased by Dr. Jovan Pivnički, hosted Mihajlo Pupin, Branislav Nušić, Laza Kostić and Vladimir Tolstoy, Leo Tolstoy's grandson. Member of the Pivnički family is Mila Mulroney (née Milica Pivnički), the spouse of the prime minister of Canada Brian Mulroney and granddaughter of Jovan. Born in Sarajevo, she lived in the house as a newborn until 1958, when she was 5 and her family emigrated to Canada.

== Nature ==
=== Slano Kopovo ===
Slano Kopovo is located in the northeast of Novi Bečej and near the river Tisa, in its ancient meander. Though salty, it has a freshwater depression on the eastern side. It is one of the last preserved salt marshes in Serbia. It features unique Pannonian habitats typified by salty, muddy ponds and lakes or their occasionally dry beds. Slano Kopovo is a priceless centre of salt-marsh habitats which is threatened with complete disappearance.

The Slano Kopovo is a bird habitat in Serbia. Species are found nesting here which are typical of the Ponto-Caspian and sea coasts and not of the Pannonian Plain. This is also a stopover point for migratory bird species. With the Tisa close by, species which follow the course of this river and its forest belt alight on this wide, open water surface.

The main attraction are the cranes. They arrive in the late fall, migrating from the Northern Europe and are the largest crane population in the Pannonian Plane. Over 20,000 cranes gather on the lake, with additional thousands of other birds, like mallards and geese. Several marine birds, rarely seen far from the sea, nest in the area: Kentish plover, black-winged stilt, pied avocet. In total, 203 bird species have been recorded at Slano Kopovo, which is 63% of all the known species in Vojvodina. Some 80 species nest in the marsh.

Slano Kopovo has been declared a special natural reserve, Important Bird Area and a Ramsar site.

== Gallery ==
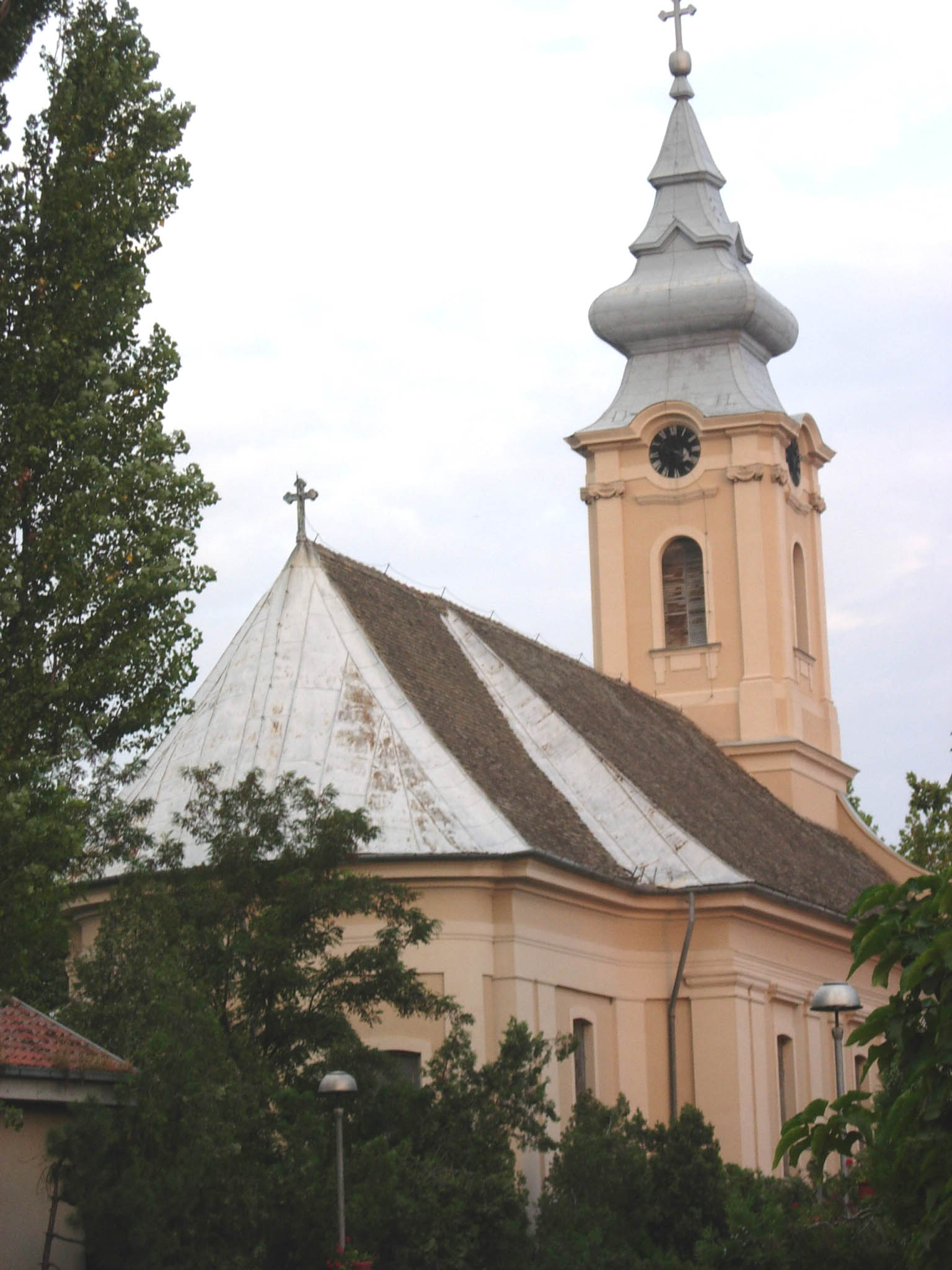
The Saint Clare of Assisi Catholic Church.

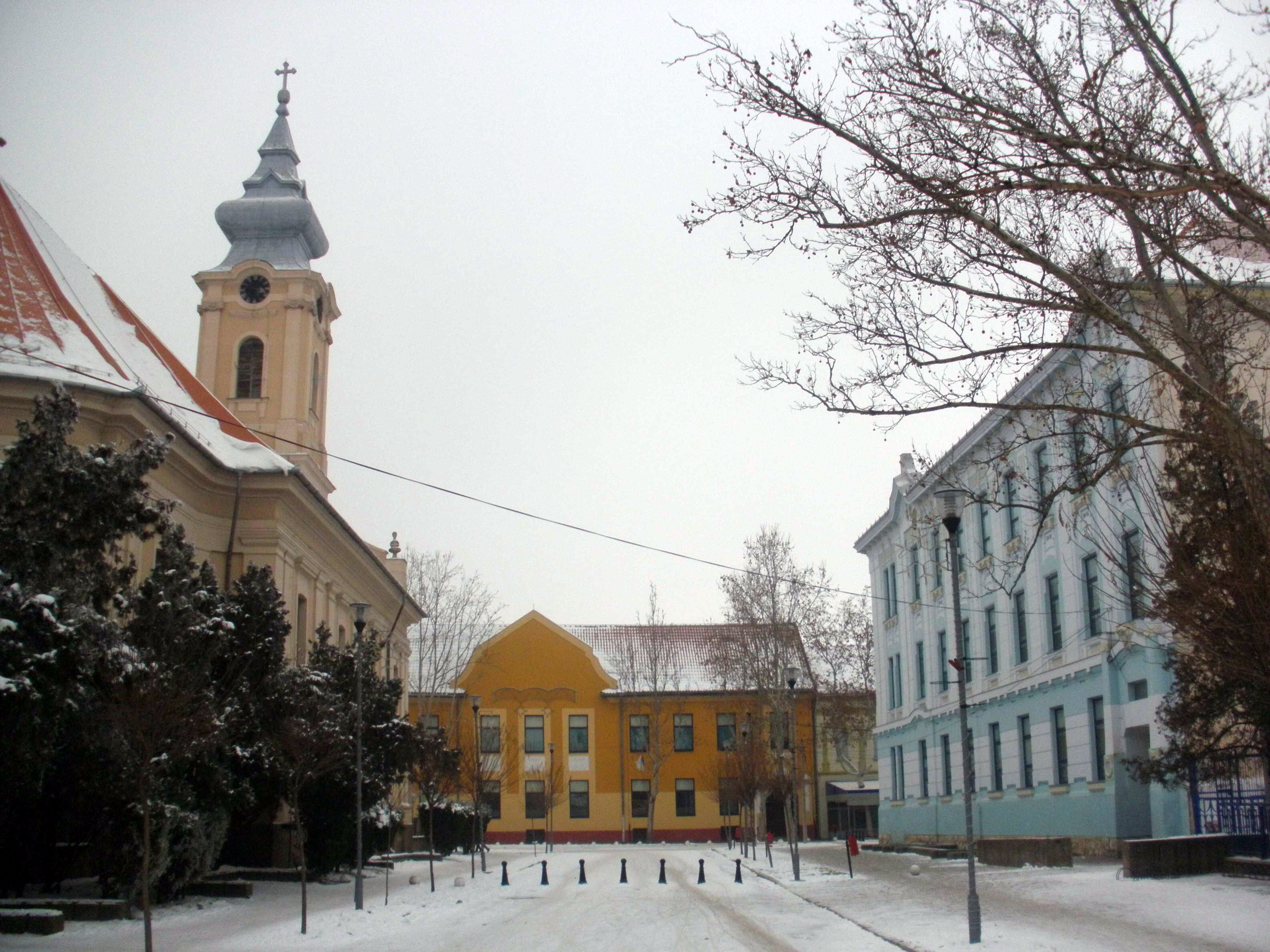
Catholic Church and Old Elementary School after restoration 2011.

== Notable citizens ==
- Aleksandar Berić, Serbian war hero in the Kingdom of Yugoslavia
- Josif Marinković, Serbian composer
- Dubravka Nešović, Serbian singer
- Slavko Simić, Serbian actor
- Joca Savić, actor
- Ognjeslav Kostović, inventor
- dr Vladimir Glavaš
- dr Jene Sentklarai
- Draginja Ružić, first Serbian professional actress
- Nikanor, episkop Bački, prelate

== Twin cities ==
- Mezőtúr, Hungary
- Štúrovo, Slovakia
- Bataysk, Russia
- Straža, Slovenia
- Knjaževac, Serbia

== See also ==
- Municipalities of Serbia
- Central Banat District
- List of places in Serbia
- List of cities, towns and villages in Vojvodina

== Sources ==
- Slobodan Ćurčić, Broj stanovnika Vojvodine, Novi Sad, 1996.
