= Pera Dobrinović =

Serbian actor (1853-1923)

Petar "Pera" Dobrinović
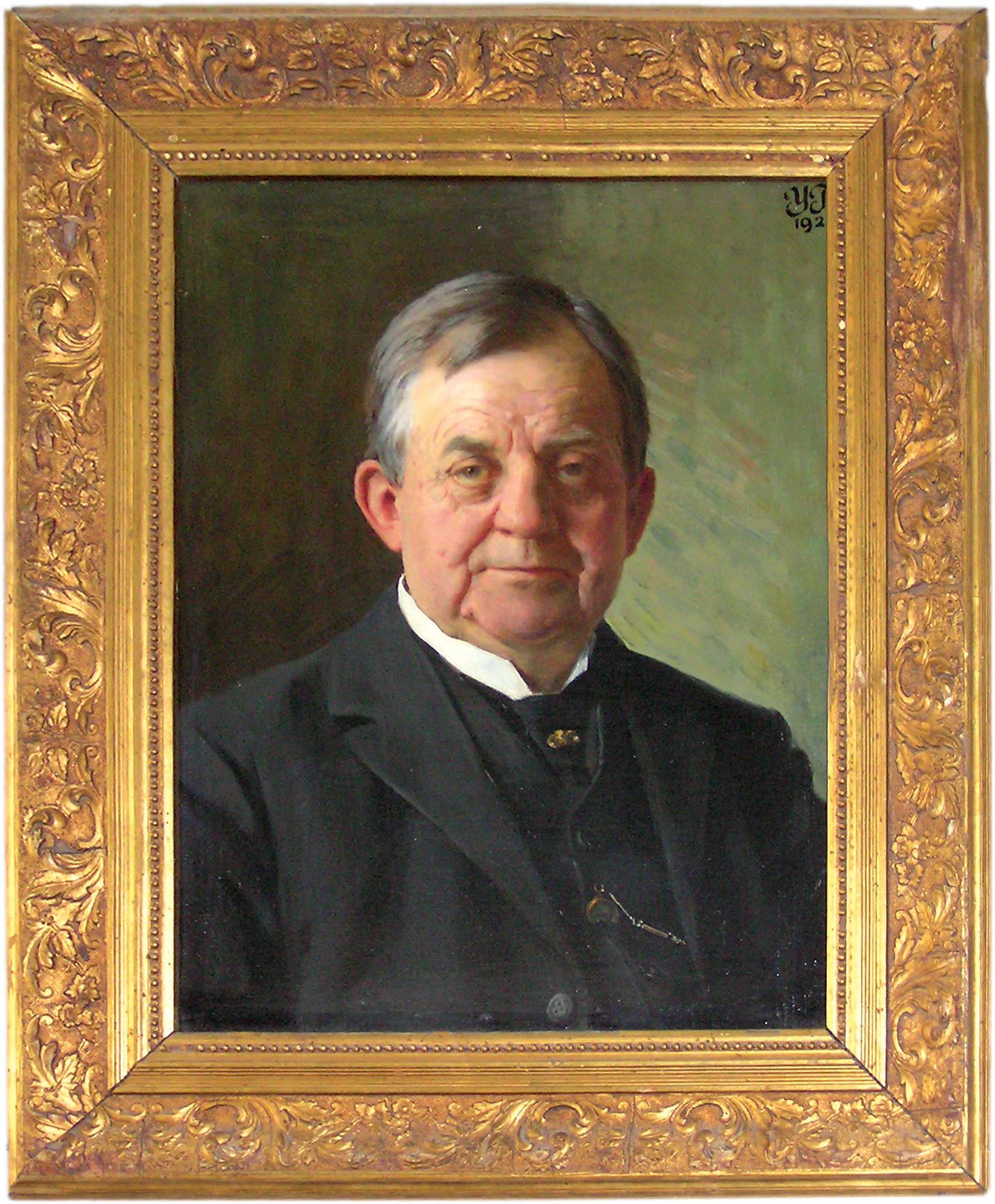
- A portrait of Dobrinović by Uroš Predić from 1921
- Born: 11 June 1853; Belgrade, Principality of Serbia
- Died: 21 December 1923 (aged 70); Novi Sad, Kingdom of Serbs, Croats and Slovenes
- Occupation(s): actor, theatre director

Petar "Pera" Dobrinović (Serbian Cyrillic: Петар „Пера“ Добриновић; 1853–1923) was a Serbian actor and director at the Serbian National Theatre in Novi Sad.

== Sources ==
- Марковић, Олга (2003). "Пера Добриновић" (PDF). MPUS.
